= Opinion polling for the 2018 Czech presidential election =

This page lists nationwide public opinion polls that have been conducted relating to the 2018 Czech presidential election.

Poll results are listed in the tables below in reverse chronological order, showing the most recent first. The highest percentage figure in each polling survey is displayed in bold, and the background shaded in the leading candidate's colour. In the instance that there is a tie, then no figure is shaded. Poll results use the date the survey's fieldwork was done, as opposed to the date of publication. However, if such date is unknown, the date of publication will be given instead.

== Opinion polls for the first round ==
View source data.

=== Since nominations were closed ===
Date	Agency	Sample size	Miloš Zeman	Jiří Drahoš	Michal Horáček	Mirek Topolánek	Pavel Fischer	Marek Hilšer	Vratislav Kulhánek	Jiří Hynek	Petr Hannig	Undecided
12 - 13 Jan 2018	1st round result	—N/a	38.6	**26.6**	9.2	4.3	10.2	8.8	0.5	1.2	0.6	—N/a
9 - 11 Jan 2018	TNS Kantar & Median	2,014	38.5	**29.0**	10.0	5.5	8.5	6.0	0.5	1.0	1.0	0
3 - 7 Jan 2018	TNS Kantar & Median	1,504	42.5	**27.5**	12.5	6.0	7.0	2.5	1.5	0.5	0.5	0
7 Jan 2018	STEM	1,012	45.5	**27.2**	10.3	5.5	5.7	4.6	0.5	0.3	0.4	
2 - 7 Jan	STEM/MARK	715	29.0	**19.0**	14.0	4.0	5.0	9.0	1.0	2.0	1.0	26.0
5 Jan 2018	Phoenix Research		29.0	14.0	15.0	**16.0**	7.0	6.0	—N/a	—N/a	—N/a	
3 - 5 Jan 2018	STEM	1,012	46.0	**27.0**	10.0	6.0	6.0	5.0	1.0	0.0	0.0	
30 Dec 2017 - 4 Jan 2018	Sanep	1,852	31.4	**20.2**	7.1	17.1	10.2	6.3	1.2	4.1	2.4	
14 - 29 Dec 2017	Phoenix Research	1,260	34.0	**17.0**	10.0	14.0	6.0	2.0	2.0	1.0	1.0	13.0
2 - 17 Dec 2017	CVVM	1,049	32.0	**21.5**	10.5	2.5	3.0	4.0	1.5	1.0	1.0	23.0
1 - 15 Dec 2017	Phoenix Research	1,260	31.0	**17.0**	8.0	15.0	4.0	1.0	2.0	1.0	1.0	20.0
1 - 15 Dec 2017	STEM/MARK	724	33.0	**22.0**	16.0	4.0	5.0	3.0	2.0	1.0	1.0	13.0
9 - 14 Dec 2017	TNS Kantar & Median	1,504	43.5	**28.5**	11.5	7.0	5.0	2.0	1.5	1.0	0.5	0
11 Dec 2017	STEM	1,027	42.0	**28.0**	11.0	4.0	7.0	5.0	2.0	0.0	1.0	
23 - 26 Nov 2017	Sanep	12,894	30.2	**23.6**	9.7	16.8	6.3	3.9	1.9	4.5	3.1	0
11 - 15 Nov 2017	TNS Kantar & Median	800	41.5	**30.5**	16.5	4.0	2.5	2.5	1.0	0.5	1.0	0
1 - 15 Nov 2017	STEM/MARK	715	31.0	**22.0**	17.0	4.0	4.0	3.0	2.0	2.0	—N/a	15.0

=== Polls conducted in 2017 ===
April - 7 November

Date	Agency	Miloš Zeman	Michal Horáček	Jiří Drahoš	Jaroslav Kubera	Marek Hilšer	Vratislav Kulhánek	Karel Štogl	Igor Sládek	Jana Yngland Hrušková	Otto Chaloupka	Jiří Hynek	Petr Hannig	Pavel Fischer	Tomio Okamura	Others
11 Oct - 5 Nov	Median	30.0	10.0	**19.0**	4.0	3.0	3.0	—N/a	—N/a	—N/a	1.0	1.0	—N/a	2.0	—N/a	
1 - 31 Oct	STEM/MARK	33.0	20.0	**21.0**	—N/a	—N/a	—N/a	—N/a	—N/a	—N/a	—N/a	—N/a	—N/a	—N/a	—N/a	26.0
9 - 19 Oct	CVVM	34.0	13.0	**22.0**	2.0	1.0	2.0	—N/a	—N/a	—N/a	—N/a	—N/a	—N/a	—N/a	1.0	25.0
11 Oct	Herzmann	36.3	22.1	**25.9**		—N/a	—N/a	—N/a	—N/a	—N/a	—N/a	—N/a	—N/a	—N/a	—N/a	
31 Aug - 21 Sep	Median	27.0	8.0	**24.0**	5.0	1.0	2.0	0.0	—N/a	—N/a	1.0	1.0	0.0	—N/a	—N/a	31.0
4 - 14 Sep	CVVM	31.0	14.0	**18.0**	2.0	1.0	1.0	—N/a	—N/a	—N/a	—N/a	—N/a	—N/a	—N/a	—N/a	33.0
14 - 28 Aug	Focus	28.1	12.4	**13.0**	2.6	1.4	1.3	0.2	0.1	0.4	0.1	—N/a	0.4	—N/a	—N/a	40.1
18 - 27 Aug	Médea Research	42.25	17.12	**19.05**	—N/a	—N/a	—N/a	—N/a	—N/a	—N/a	—N/a	—N/a	—N/a	—N/a	—N/a	21.85
7 Aug	Médea Research	> 40.0	14.0	**20.0**	—N/a	—N/a	—N/a	—N/a	—N/a	—N/a	—N/a	—N/a	—N/a	—N/a	—N/a	
10 July	Médea Research	43.0	**16.2**	15.9	—N/a	—N/a	—N/a	—N/a	—N/a	—N/a	—N/a	—N/a	—N/a	—N/a	—N/a	
24 May - 25 June	Median	28.0	10.0	**20.0**	—N/a	—N/a	—N/a	—N/a	—N/a	—N/a	—N/a	—N/a	—N/a	—N/a	—N/a	42.0
25–26 May	Median	35.0	20.0	**24.0**	—N/a	2.0	—N/a	1.0	1.0	1.0	1.0	—N/a	—N/a	—N/a	—N/a	15.0
31 March - 21 April 2017	Median	27.0	**13.0**	**13.0**	—N/a	2.0	—N/a	1.0	—N/a	—N/a	—N/a	—N/a	—N/a	—N/a	—N/a	44.0
9 May	Médea Research	47.5	**16.3**	12.5	—N/a	—N/a	—N/a	—N/a	—N/a	—N/a	—N/a	—N/a	—N/a	—N/a	—N/a	23.7
18 Apr	TNS Kantar	38.9	**18.7**	15.1	—N/a	2.5	—N/a	—N/a	—N/a	—N/a	—N/a	—N/a	—N/a	—N/a	—N/a	24.8
7 - 10 Apr	Median	37.0	**20.0**	17.0	—N/a	2.0	—N/a	1.0	1.0	—N/a	—N/a	—N/a	—N/a	—N/a	—N/a	23.0

January - April

Date	Agency	Miloš Zeman	Michal Horáček	Jiří Drahoš	Marek Hilšer	Martin Stropnický	Jiří Pospíšil	Jan Švejnar	Tomio Okamura	Šimon Pánek	Václav Klaus	Petr Pavel	Tomáš Halík	Zuzana Roithová	Jaroslav Kubera	Zdeněk Škromach	Miroslav Sládek	Others
10 Apr	Médea Research	**44.92**	**20.18**	6.7	0.4	2.5	2.2	4.5	2.4	1.1	3.1	2.8	1.6	1.0	1.5	0.1	0.2	4.8
13 Mar	Médea Research	**35.2**	**13.8**	5.0	—N/a	3.0	—N/a	8.0	5.1 - 7.9	—N/a	—N/a	—N/a	—N/a	—N/a	—N/a	—N/a	—N/a	35.0
2–8 March	Phoenix Research	**35.0**	**11.0**	3.0	1.0	9.0	8.0	5.0	—N/a	—N/a	—N/a	—N/a	—N/a	—N/a	4.0	3.0	1.0	20.0
6 Feb	Médea Research	**39.5**	**17.4**	1.0	—N/a	5.0	3.0	5.0	4.3	4.0	3.6	3.6	3.0	3.0	3.0	—N/a	—N/a	5.6

=== Polls conducted in 2016 ===
Date	Agency	Miloš Zeman	Michal Horáček	Jan Švejnar	Jiří Pospíšil	Tomáš Halík	Vladimír Dlouhý	Václav Klaus	Zuzana Roithová	Šimon Pánek	Tomio Okamura	Věra Jourová	Zdeněk Škromach	Jaroslav Kubera	Andrej Babiš	Others
22 Sep - 10 Oct	Median	**25.0**	**7.0**	3.0	1.0	1.0	—N/a	3.0	—N/a	—N/a	3.0	—N/a	—N/a	—N/a	3.0	30.0
15 - 19 Jun	Sanep	**29.5**	**12.9**	3.2	2.4	2.1	1.2	6.2	5.7	—N/a	2.3	0.3	1.8	5.2	—N/a	21.4
13 Jun	Médea Research	**26.0**	**13.5**	9.5	4.4	4.3	3.4	3.3	—N/a	3.2	1.9	1.8	1.7	1.5	—N/a	26.5

=== Polls conducted in 2015 ===
Date	Agency	Miloš Zeman	Václav Klaus	Petr Pavel	Tomáš Halík	Jan Švejnar	Jiří Pospíšil	Jaroslav Kubera	Pavel Rychetský	Martin Stropnický	Jiří Dienstbier	Vladimír Dlouhý	Zdeněk Škromach	Others
28 - 29 Nov	iDnes	**20.3**	6.5	**14.4**	9.5	7.9	6.3	5.2	4.7	4.1	3.2	3.2	0.2	12.2
3 - 7 Aug	Sanep	**37.6**	**11.3**	10.8	7.5	—N/a	—N/a	—N/a	—N/a	—N/a	—N/a	—N/a	0.8	32.0

=== Polls conducted in 2014 ===
Date	Agency	Miloš Zeman	Karel Schwarzenberg	Andrej Babiš	Václav Klaus	Tomáš Halík	Jiří Dienstbier	Bohuslav Sobotka	Zuzana Roithová	Věra Jourová	Zdeněk Škromach	Vladimír Franz	Karel Janeček	Others
3 - 10 Oct	Sanep	**20.3**	12.8	**14.1**	9.1	8.5	8.2	6.9	4.4	3.8	3.4	2.9	2.9	2.7

== Opinion polls for the second round ==
=== Zeman vs Drahoš ===
Date	Agency	Sample size	Miloš Zeman	Jiří Drahoš	Undecided / Not voting
26 - 27 Jan 2018	2nd round result		**51.4**	48.6	
26 - 27 Jan 2018	Median Exit poll		**51.7**	48.3	0
26 - 27 Jan 2018	Median	1,149	**35.0**	33.0	33.0
24 - 25 Jan 2018	Median	1,149	**32.0**	**32.0**	37.0
24 - 25 Jan 2018	STEM	1,015	**46.0**	45.0	3.4
22 - 25 Jan 2018	TNS Kantar	1,156	45.5	**46.0**	8.5
22 - 23 Jan 2018	Median	1,149	30.0	**33.0**	38.0
23 January 2018	A pre-election ban on opinion polling comes into effect.				
17 - 22 Jan 2018	Phoenix Research		**41.5**	39.2	19.3
17 - 19 Jan 2018	STEM	1,007	43.7	**51.7**	4.6
16 - 18 Jan 2018	TNS Kantar & Median	1,522	**45.5**	45.0	9.5
15 - 17 Jan 2018	STEM/MARK	1,078	43.0	**47.0**	10.0
13 - 17 Jan 2018	Phoenix Research	950	35.6	**37.0**	27.4
12 - 13 Jan 2018	STEM/MARK	2,568	49.2	**50.8**	0
3 - 7 Jan 2018	TNS Kantar & Median	1,504	44.0	**48.5**	7.5
2 - 7 Jan	STEM/MARK	715	42.0	**48.0**	0
9 - 14 Dec 2017	TNS Kantar & Median	1,504	**45.0**	**45.0**	10.0
11 Oct - 5 Nov	Median	907	49.0	**51.0**	0
31 Aug - 21 Sep	Median	928	44.5	**55.5**	0
24 May - 25 June 2017	Median	903	46.5	**53.5**	0
31 March - 21 April 2017	Median	959	49.5	**50.5**	0
10 April 2017	Médea Research		**61.8**	38.2	0

=== Hypothetical polling ===
The polls listed below include candidates who decided not to run, failed to secure nomination, or did not advance past the first round of the election.

Zeman vs Horáček

Date	Agency	Miloš Zeman	Michal Horáček
3 - 7 Jan 2018	TNS Kantar & Median	**48.5**	46.0
2 - 7 Jan	STEM/MARK	**46.0**	44.0
9 - 14 Dec 2017	TNS Kantar & Median	**47.5**	36.0
11 Oct - 5 Nov	Median	**57.5**	42.5
31 Aug - 21 Sep	Median	**52.5**	47.5
24 May - 25 June 2017	Median	**56.0**	44.0
31 March - 21 April 2017	Median	**50.0**	**50.0**
10 April 2017	Médea Research	**52.4**	47.6
22 Sep - 10 Oct 2016	Median	44.0	**47.5**
20 - 23 Jun 2016	Sanep	**56.2**	43.8

Zeman vs Topolánek

Date	Agency	Miloš Zeman	Mirek Topolánek
3 - 7 Jan 2018	TNS Kantar & Median	**61.0**	31.5
2 - 7 Jan	STEM/MARK	**56.0**	29.0
9 - 14 Dec 2017	TNS Kantar & Median	**64.0**	28.5

Zeman vs Fischer

Date	Agency	Miloš Zeman	Pavel Fischer
3 - 7 Jan 2018	TNS Kantar & Median	**50.5**	42.0
2 - 7 Jan	STEM/MARK	**47.0**	39.0
9 - 14 Dec 2017	TNS Kantar & Median	**48.5**	42.0

Zeman vs Hilšer

Date	Agency	Miloš Zeman	Marek Hilšer
2 - 7 Jan	STEM/MARK	**46.0**	41.0
22 Sep - 10 Oct 2016	Median	**40.0**	17.5

Zeman vs Kulhánek

Date	Agency	Miloš Zeman	Vratislav Kulhánek
2 - 7 Jan	STEM/MARK	**49.0**	35.0
22 Sep - 10 Oct 2016	Median	**50.0**	27.5

Zeman vs Hynek

Date	Agency	Miloš Zeman	Jiří Hynek
2 - 7 Jan	STEM/MARK	**49.0**	34.0

Zeman vs Hannig

Date	Agency	Miloš Zeman	Petr Hannig
2 - 7 Jan	STEM/MARK	**51.0**	28.0

Drahoš vs Horáček

Date	Agency	Jiří Drahoš	Michal Horáček
9 - 14 Dec 2017	TNS Kantar & Median	**56.0**	28.5
11 Oct - 5 Nov	Median	**64.5**	35.5
31 Aug - 21 Sep	Median	**66.0**	34.0
24 May - 25 June 2017	Median	**63.0**	37.0
22 Sep - 10 Oct 2016	Median	**56.5**	43.5

Drahoš vs Topolánek

Date	Agency	Jiří Drahoš	Mirek Topolánek
9 - 14 Dec 2017	TNS Kantar & Median	**73.5**	16.5

Drahoš vs Fischer

Date	Agency	Jiří Drahoš	Pavel Fischer
9 - 14 Dec 2017	TNS Kantar & Median	**55.0**	28.5

Zeman vs Kubera

Date	Agency	Miloš Zeman	Jaroslav Kubera
31 Aug - 21 Sep	Median	**58.0**	42.0

Zeman vs Švejnar

Date	Agency	Miloš Zeman	Jan Švejnar
10 April 2017	Médea Research	**54.7**	45.3
22 Sep - 10 Oct 2016	Median	42.0	**47.5**

Zeman vs Pospíšil

Date	Agency	Miloš Zeman	Jiří Pospíšil
24 May - 25 June 2017	Median	**57.0**	43.0
31 March - 21 April 2017	Median	**56.0**	44.0
22 Sep - 10 Oct 2016	Median	**48.5**	40.5

Zeman vs Stropnický

Date	Agency	Miloš Zeman	Martin Stropnický
24 May - 25 June 2017	Median	**60.0**	40.0
31 March - 21 April 2017	Median	**59.0**	41.0
22 Sep - 10 Oct 2016	Median	**52.0**	44.0

Zeman vs Okamura

Date	Agency	Miloš Zeman	Tomio Okamura
22 Sep - 10 Oct 2016	Median	**67.0**	28.0

Zeman vs Wagnerová

Date	Agency	Miloš Zeman	Eliška Wagnerová
22 Sep - 10 Oct 2016	Median	**45.0**	28.5

Zeman vs Dlouhý

Date	Agency	Miloš Zeman	Vladimír Dlouhý
22 Sep - 10 Oct 2016	Median	**48.0**	38.0

Zeman vs Jourová

Date	Agency	Miloš Zeman	Věra Jourová
22 Sep - 10 Oct 2016	Median	**49.5**	34.0

Zeman vs Halík

Date	Agency	Miloš Zeman	Tomáš Halík
22 Sep - 10 Oct 2016	Median	**52.0**	32.0

Zeman vs Kolář

Date	Agency	Miloš Zeman	Petr Kolář
31 March - 21 April 2017	Median	**60.0**	40.0
22 Sep - 10 Oct 2016	Median	**40.5**	21.5

Drahoš vs Stropnický

Date	Agency	Jiří Drahoš	Martin Stropnický
22 Sep - 10 Oct 2016	Median	**63.5**	36.5

Horáček vs Stropnický

Date	Agency	Michal Horáček	Martin Stropnický
22 Sep - 10 Oct 2016	Median	**61.0**	39.0

== Probability of being elected ==
Two agencies published trackers where they continually inferred the probability of election of the candidates.

Date	Agency	Miloš Zeman	Jiří Drahoš	Mirek Topolánek	Michal Horáček	Vratislav Kulhánek	Pavel Fischer	Jiří Hynek	Marek Hilšer	Petr Hannig
20 December 2017	kdovyhrajevolby.cz	44.1	43.6	4.9	5.6	0.3	0.8	0.3	0.3	0.1
19 December 2017	kdovyhrajevolby.cz	43.9	44.1	4.5	5.6	0.3	0.8	0.3	0.4	0.1
17 December 2017	Pollster	50.0	27.0	10.0	9.0	1.0	1.0	1.0	1.0	0.0
17 December 2017	kdovyhrajevolby.cz	43.2	45.4	3.3	6.0	0.3	0.9	0.3	0.5	0.1
11 December 2017	kdovyhrajevolby.cz	44.3	42.8	4.8	6.1	0.6	0.6	0.3	0.4	0.1
9 December 2017	Pollster	49.0	28.0	10.0	10.0	1.0	1.0	1.0	1.0	0.0
9 December 2017	kdovyhrajevolby.cz	44.2	42.9	4.9	6.1	0.6	0.6	0.3	0.4	0.1
7 December 2017	Pollster	48.0	28.0	10.0	9.0	1.0	1.0	1.0	1.0	0.0
7 December 2017	kdovyhrajevolby.cz	43.4	43.8	5.2	5.6	0.6	0.6	0.3	0.4	0.1
5 December 2017	Pollster	48.0	29.0	10.0	9.0	1.0	1.0	1.0	1.0	0.0
5 December 2017	kdovyhrajevolby.cz	43.1	43.8	5.1	5.5	0.7	0.6	0.4	0.4	0.1
3 December 2017	Pollster	47.0	30.0	10.0	9.0	1.0	1.0	1.0	1.0	0.0
3 December 2017	kdovyhrajevolby.cz	43.5	43.7	5.4	5.3	0.7	0.6	0.4	0.4	0.1
1 December 2017	Pollster	47.0	30.0	10.0	9.0	1.0	1.0	1.0	1.0	0.0
1 December 2017	kdovyhrajevolby.cz	43.5	43.5	5.4	5.2	0.7	0.6	0.4	0.5	0.1
30 November 2017	Pollster	46.0	31.0	11.0	8.0	1.0	1.0	1.0	1.0	0.0
30 November 2017	kdovyhrajevolby.cz	44.8	42.5	5.4	5.1	0.8	0.6	0.4	0.4	0.1
29 November 2017	Pollster	46.0	31.0	13.0	6.0	1.0	1.0	1.0	0.0	0.0
29 November 2017	kdovyhrajevolby.cz	44.4	42.7	6.5	4.3	0.7	0.5	0.4	0.4	0.1
28 November 2017	Pollster	47.0	34.0	9.0	6.0	2.0	1.0	1.0	0.0	0.0
28 November 2017	kdovyhrajevolby.cz	43.5	42.3	7.3	4.6	0.8	0.6	0.4	0.5	0.1
24 November 2017	Pollster	43.0	32.0	17.0	6.0	2.0	1.0	1.0	1.0	0.0
24 November 2017	kdovyhrajevolby.cz	43.3	42.0	7.9	4.5	0.8	0.6	0.4	0.5	0.1
23 November 2017	Pollster	43.0	31.0	17.0	6.0	2.0	1.0	1.0	1.0	0.0
23 November 2017	kdovyhrajevolby.cz	43.3	42.0	7.9	4.5	0.8	0.6	0.4	0.5	0.1
22 November 2017	Pollster	43.0	30.0	17.0	6.0	2.0	1.0	1.0	1.0	0.0
22 November 2017	kdovyhrajevolby.cz	42.9	41.1	8.3	4.7	0.8	0.6	0.8	0.7	0.2
21 November 2017	Pollster	44.0	30.0	16.0	6.0	2.0	1.0	1.0	1.0	0.0
21 November 2017	kdovyhrajevolby.cz	43.5	40.7	8.0	4.7	0.8	0.6	0.8	0.7	0.2
20 November 2017	Pollster	44.0	31.0	15.0	6.0	2.0	1.0	1.0	1.0	0.0
20 November 2017	kdovyhrajevolby.cz	43.7	40.7	8.0	4.6	0.8	0.5	0.7	0.7	0.2
19 November 2017	Pollster	42.0	30.0	18.0	6.0	2.0	1.0	1.0	1.0	0.0
19 November 2017	kdovyhrajevolby.cz	43.9	40.9	7.4	4.7	0.8	0.6	0.7	0.7	0.2
18 November 2017	Pollster	42.0	30.0	18.0	6.0	2.0	1.0	1.0	1.0	0.0
18 November 2017	kdovyhrajevolby.cz	37.9	37.4	15.4	6.1	1.0	0.7	0.7	0.7	0.2
17 November 2017	Pollster	42.0	30.0	18.0	6.0	2.0	1.0	1.0	1.0	0.0
17 November 2017	kdovyhrajevolby.cz	37.9	37.4	15.4	6.0	1.0	0.7	0.7	0.7	0.2
16 November 2017	Pollster	42.0	30.0	18.0	6.0	2.0	1.0	1.0	1.0	0.0
16 November 2017	kdovyhrajevolby.cz	37.9	37.3	15.5	6.0	1.0	0.7	0.7	0.7	0.2
15 November 2017	Pollster	42.0	30.0	18.0	6.0	2.0	1.0	1.0	1.0	0.0
15 November 2017	kdovyhrajevolby.cz	37.9	37.3	15.5	5.9	1.0	0.7	0.7	0.7	0.2
14 November 2017	Pollster	42.0	30.0	16.0	7.0	2.0	1.0	1.0	1.0	0.0
14 November 2017	kdovyhrajevolby.cz	38.1	37.2	15.5	5.9	1.0	0.7	0.7	0.7	0.2
13 November 2017	Pollster	42.0	31.0	16.0	7.0	2.0	1.0	1.0	1.0	0.0
13 November 2017	kdovyhrajevolby.cz	38.3	37.4	14.7	6.3	1.0	0.7	0.7	0.7	0.2
12 November 2017	Pollster	42.0	31.0	16.0	7.0	2.0	1.0	1.0	1.0	0.0
12 November 2017	kdovyhrajevolby.cz	38.2	37.5	14.7	6.2	1.0	0.7	0.7	0.7	0.2
11 November 2017	Pollster	43.0	32.0	14.0	7.0	2.0	1.0	1.0	1.0	0.0
11 November 2017	kdovyhrajevolby.cz	38.4	38.0	13.8	6.3	1.1	0.8	0.8	0.7	0.2
10 November 2017	Pollster	43.0	33.0	12.0	8.0	2.0	1.0	1.0	1.0	0.0
10 November 2017	kdovyhrajevolby.cz	39.9	38.7	11.6	6.4	1.1	0.8	0.8	0.7	0.2
9 November 2017	Pollster	44.0	34.0	11.0	8.0	2.0	1.0	1.0	1.0	0.0
9 November 2017	kdovyhrajevolby.cz	39.9	38.7	11.7	6.3	1.1	0.8	0.8	0.7	0.2
8 November 2017	Pollster	41.4	28.0	12.1	7.0	2.0	1.0	1.0	1.0	0.0
8 November 2017	kdovyhrajevolby.cz	38.8	38.9	12.5	6.2	1.1	0.8	0.8	0.8	0.3
7 November 2017	Pollster	44.0	25.5	7.4	6.9	—N/a	—N/a	—N/a	—N/a	—N/a
7 November 2017	kdovyhrajevolby.cz	40.4	36.2	14.3	5.6	1.0	0.7	0.8	0.8	0.3
6 November 2017	Pollster	44.7	27.2	3.2	8.2	—N/a	—N/a	—N/a	—N/a	—N/a
5 November 2017	Pollster	45.8	27.9	0.6	8.4	—N/a	—N/a	—N/a	—N/a	—N/a

== Election potential ==
Date	Agency	Miloš Zeman	Jiří Drahoš	Michal Horáček	Mirek Topolánek	Pavel Fischer	Marek Hilšer	Vratislav Kulhánek	Petr Hannig	Jiří Hynek
2 - 7 Jan 2018	TNS Kantar & Median	**49.0**	**43.0**	31.5	15.5	22.0	11.5	9.5	6.0	8.0
9 - 14 Dec 2017	TNS Kantar & Median	**48.0**	**41.5**	28.5	14.5	21.5	9.5	8.0	4.5	5.5
11 - 15 Nov 2017	TNS Kantar & Median	**45.0**	**41.5**	37.0	9.5	11.5	6.5	5.0	3.0	2.5
Nov 2017	STEM/MARK	**45.0**	**40.0**	32.0	12.0	16.0	12.0	12.0	-	3.0

== Acceptability of candidates ==
=== Since nominations were closed ===
Date	Agency	Sample size	Miloš Zeman	Jiří Drahoš	Michal Horáček	Mirek Topolánek	Pavel Fischer	Marek Hilšer	Vratislav Kulhánek	Petr Hannig	Jiří Hynek
24 dec - 15 Dec 2017	STEM/MARK	1,504	**47.0**	**60.0**	38.0	10.0	40.0	38.0	20.0	13.0	20.0

=== Polls conducted before ===
Date	Agency	Miloš Zeman	Jiří Drahoš	Michal Horáček	Pavel Fischer	Marek Hilšer	Jan Švejnar	Tomio Okamura	Jiří Pospíšil	Tomáš Halík	Vladimír Dlouhý	Eliška Wagnerová	Martin Stropnický	Jaroslav Kubera	Věra Jourová	Petr Kolář	Karel Štogl
24 May - 25 June 2017	Median	**45.0**	**50.0**	35.0	—N/a	—N/a	—N/a	—N/a	—N/a	—N/a	—N/a	—N/a	—N/a	—N/a	—N/a	—N/a	—N/a
31 March - 21 April 2017	Median	**49.0**	**44.0**	**44.0**	18.0	—N/a	—N/a	31.0	—N/a	—N/a	—N/a	30.0	—N/a	—N/a	—N/a	19.0	12.0
22 Sep - 10 Oct 2016	Median	**52.0**	—N/a	44.0	—N/a	13.0	**48.0**	26.0	33.0	25.0	34.0	26.0	33.0	17.0	24.0	19.0	—N/a

== Media Surveys ==
=== Since nominations were closed ===
Date	Agency	Miloš Zeman	Jiří Drahoš	Mirek Topolánek	Michal Horáček	Vratislav Kulhánek	Pavel Fischer	Jiří Hynek	Marek Hilšer	Petr Hannig	Josef Toman
8 Jan 2018	iDnes	11.4	**29.3**	**17.2**	12.6	0.7	14.9	2.1	11.1	0.6	—N/a
7 Jan 2018	info.cz	—N/a	14.7	**73.7**	8.9	—N/a	—N/a	—N/a	—N/a	—N/a	—N/a
8 Nov 2017	Lidovky.cz	16.8	**51.4**	13.6	6.2	0.7	3.1	2.8	3.7	0.7	0.8

=== Before nominations were closed ===
Date	Agency	Miloš Zeman	Michal Horáček	Jan Švejnar	Jiří Pospíšil	Others
6 Jun 2016	Lidovky.cz	**26.7**	**46.2**	14.3	4.3	1.5

== Other opinion polls ==
=== Multiple question ===
Date	Question	Agency	Miloš Zeman	Jiří Drahoš	Michal Horáček	Mirek Topolánek	Marek Hilšer	Pavel Fischer	Vratislav Kulhánek	Petr Hannig	Jiří Hynek	Do not know/Undecided
21 Dec 2017	Which candidate would be able to achieve political agreement	Phoenix Research	**24.0**	15.0	8.0	**16.0**	—N/a	—N/a	—N/a	—N/a	—N/a	39.0

== Other voting ==
Date	Voting	Miloš Zeman	Jiří Drahoš	Michal Horáček	Mirek Topolánek	Marek Hilšer	Pavel Fischer	Vratislav Kulhánek	Petr Hannig	Jiří Hynek
22 Jan 2018	Young Social Democrats members poll	18.3	**81.7**	—N/a	—N/a	—N/a	—N/a	—N/a	—N/a	—N/a
6 Jan 2018	Czech Pirate Party members poll	4.0	**21.0**	17.0	3.0	**40.0**	5.0	0.0	0.0	0.0
4 Jan 2018	President of countryside	0.6	22.9	0.6	**38.3**	4.6	**24.6**	1.7	1.1	5.1
4 Jan 2018	700 Entrepreneurs poll of the Czech Chamber of Commerce	**20.0**	**28.0**	—N/a	12.0	—N/a	—N/a	—N/a	—N/a	—N/a
12 - 13 Dec 2017	Student Election	**19.9**	**33.6**	9.3	6.2	13.2	9.6	2.4	3.0	2.7
8 Dec 2017	Young Social Democrats members poll	9.2	**56.3**	2.3	5.7	**18.4**	8.0	0.0	0.0	0.0
