= 2018 Czech presidential election debates =

The 2018 Czech presidential election debates were a series of debates held for the 2018 Czech presidential election. The incumbent president and front-runner Miloš Zeman declined to participate in debates for the first round. Zeman agreed to participate in debates against Jiří Drahoš for the second round.

== List of debates ==
Date	Debate	Miloš Zeman	Jiří Drahoš	Mirek Topolánek	Michal Horáček	Vratislav Kulhánek	Pavel Fischer	Jiří Hynek	Marek Hilšer	Petr Hannig	Source
8 November 2017	Charles University, Prague	A	P	P	P	A	P	P	P	P	
13 November 2017	Seznam News	A	P	P	P	P	P	A	P	A	
16 November 2017	Liberec Library	A	P	P	P	P	P	P	P	P	
20 November 2017	Train	A	P	P	P	P	A	P	P	A	
27 November 2017	Seznam News	A	A	A	A	A	A	P	A	P	
28 November 2017	University of West Bohemia, Plzeň	A	P	P	P	P	P	P	P	P	
5 December 2017	Seznam News	A	A	A	P	A	A	P	A	A	
8 December 2017	Seznam News	A	A	P	A	A	A	A	P	A	
11 December 2017	Světozor, Prague	A	P	A	P	A	A	P	P	P	
12 December 2017	Seznam News	A	P	A	A	A	P	A	A	A	
12 December 2017	Jagello 2000	A	P	P	P	P	P	P	P	P	
13 December 2017	Seznam News	A	A	A	A	P	A	A	A	P	
13 December 2017	Masaryk University, Brno	A	P	P	P	P	P	P	P	P	
14 December 2017	University of Economics, Prague	A	A	A	P	P	P	P	P	P	
15 December 2017	Proglas	A	P	P	P	P	P	P	P	P	
18 December 2017	Czech Television	A	A	A	A	P	P	A	A	P	
19 December 2017	Seznam News	A	P	A	P	A	A	A	A	A	
20 December 2017	Seznam News	A	A	P	P	A	A	A	A	A	
20 December 2017	Dox, Prague	A	P	A	P	P	P	P	P	P	
20 December 2017	Czech Television	A	P	A	P	A	A	A	A	A	
20 December 2017	Czech Television	A	A	P	A	P	P	A	A	A	
21 December 2017	Seznam News	A	P	P	A	A	A	A	A	A	
27 December 2017	Czech Radio	A	A	A	A	A	P	A	A	P	
28 December 2017	Czech Radio	A	A	A	P	A	A	P	A	A	
29 December 2017	Czech Radio	A	P	P	A	A	A	A	A	A	
30 December 2017	Czech Radio	A	A	A	A	P	A	A	P	A	
2 January 2018	Battle for Castle	A	P	P	P	P	P	P	P	P	
3 January 2018	Euro Magazine	A	P	P	A	A	P	A	A	A	
3 January 2018	TOPAZ	A	A	P	P	A	P	P	A	A	
4 January 2018	Czech Economical Chamber	A	P	P	A	P	P	P	A	A	
4 January 2018	Association of Private Agriculture	A	P	P	P	P	P	P	P	P	
4 January 2018	Battle for Castle	A	A	A	P	A	P	A	A	A	
9 January 2018	Battle for Castle	A	A	P	P	A	A	A	A	A	
10 January 2018	Battle for Castle	A	A	P	A	A	P	A	A	A	
11 January 2018	Czech Television	A	P	P	P	P	P	P	P	P	
23 January 2018	Prima	P	P	A	A	A	A	A	A	A	
25 January 2018	Czech Television	P	P	A	A	A	A	A	A	A	
P = Present A = Absent

== First round debates ==
=== Charles University debate ===
The first debate was held on 8 November 2017 at Charles University. Jiří Drahoš, Michal Horáček, Marek Hilšer, Jiří Hynek, Pavel Fischer, Petr Hannig and Mirek Topolánek participated in the debate. Miloš Zeman refused to participate and instead went to Olomouc region to meet with citizens. According to Hospodářské noviny, Topolánek and Hilšer seemed as the most civil candidates. Audience was allowed to vote who they like the most. Everyone had 3 plus votes and 1 minus vote. Drahoš had 333 votes, Hilšer 227 votes, Horáček 176 votes, Fischer 128 votes, Topolánek 36 votes, Hynek minus 12 votes, Hannig minus 266 votes.

Hilšer stated that he does not want a president who was involved with dirty politics in past years. Topolánek stated that his candidacy is caused by the current political situation. Horáček stated he would disinfect Prague Castle if he is elected. Moderator then mentioned Drahoš's attack against Topolánek. Drahoš stated that he is not scared of Topolánek and stated that he will most likely explain this to Topolánek. Topolánek answered that "it was either written by a woman or PR Mage. I forgave Professor whether I ever took it seriously." Topolánek was asked if he is a candidate. He mentioned that speculations that his candidacy might be invalid are purposeful. He stated that president should be a strong persona and know the ropes in politics. He mentioned his experiences. He also stated that he would not pardon his former associate Marek Dalík. Drahoš stated that he wants Prague Castle to be open. Topolánek mentioned that he was unprepared for the discussion and can say how he feels about things. Hynek expressed regrets about Realists failure in 2017 legislative election. Topolánek called for defense of Schengen border. Drahoš stated that he wants respect for principles.

=== Seznam News Debate ===
Seznam News held a presidential debate on 13 November 2017. Mirek Topolánek, Jiří Drahoš, Michal Horáček, Pavel Fischer, Marek Hilšer and Vratislav Kulhánek participated. Topolánek dominated the debate.

The introductory part was informal. Candidates discussed whether the new president should be a politician or someone out of politics. Michal Horáček stated he believes that the new president should not be a politician. Topolánek talked about his experiences when he was President of the Council of the European Union and had to deal with Gas crisis.

Candidates also talked about Miloš Zeman. Kulhánek stated that Zeman's absence in debates is visible and makes it impossible to defend against his attacks. Fischer stated that Zeman should defend his mandate in debates. Drahoš noted that it is Zeman's own decision to not participate. Topolánek stated that he believes that Zeman knows what he does and that Zeman sends a message to voters "that they should only pick him a rival for the second round." Hilšer noted he thinks it is a lack of respect to voters.

Topolánek was then asked whom he would designate the new Prime Minister. He stated that he would meet Babiš and told him that he should choose someone else to be the Prime Minister instead of him. He also mentioned that he would call snap election if the third attempt to form a coalition government would fail. Fischer stated he does not see political creativity in Zeman's position and believes the president could be more active just as Václav Havel and Václav Klaus were. Hilšer stated that Zeman is an ally of Andrej Babiš even though he previously called Babiš an unreliable person.

In the second part the candidates asked questions. Candidates were asked if they believe that the democracy is in danger. Drahoš stated he does not think Czech democracy is in danger but believes that Czech people should be vigilant. Fischer believed that democracy is endangered by passivity and by limitations of freedom of speech. Hilšer stated that democracy is not in danger but he feels danger in privatisation of political power and that Czech democracy might go an authoritarian way. Horáček stated that democracy is always in danger. Kulhánek does not think democracy is in danger and believes that Senate and Constitutional Court can defend democracy. Topolánek stated that every democracy is in danger and every democracy has symptoms of self-destruction. He believes that we should always see symptoms of danger for democracy. He stated he sees that personal freedom is secretly being cut while people does not realise it.

Candidates were asked why they want to be president. Hilšer stated he is part of generation that did not live in totalitarian regime and wants to take responsibility. He also stated that he is an independent candidate who is not allied with political subjects. Horáček promised radical independence and stated he can recognize dirty players. Kullhánek stated he accomplished everything by himself and can offer his experience as he spent his life in a factory among regular people. Fischer talked about instability in world and believes that his experience as an ambassador and as an adviser of Václav Havel makes him a good candidate. Topolánek stated he is a democrat who knows where the Czech Republic belongs. He mentioned that he has a political past and everybody knows what to expect from him. Topolánek stated that he learns from mistakes and does not make the same mistake twice. Drahoš offered the experiences of a scientist and a manager. He stated he negotiated with politicians and saved the Czech Academy of Sciences. He mentioned he does not have a political past.

Candidates were asked how they would convince lower-class people to vote for them. Fischer stated that he would support justice for everybody. Drahoš stated that there are such people and he thinks that these people are under influence of some politicians. He would talk with them and tell them that laws apply to everybody. Hilšer mentioned that he comes from regions that are less developed and stated that some politicians created Mafia and created these problems. Topolánek mentioned problems that made them dissatisfied. He mentioned dissatisfaction with development after Velvet Revolution and with all political representations since the revolution. He mentioned fear of poverty and immigrants. He stated that it will be a difficult and a long job to convince these people to believe in politics again. Kulhánek stated that he would make them promises that he would help them and then keep them. Horáček stated that these people are angry at people who do not work and use social system as an opportunity.

In the last part candidates were asked whether they would confirm a criminally charged Prime Minister. Only Horáček stated that he would. Another question was whether candidates would support a referendum about the Czech Republic leaving European Union. All candidates declined even though Topolánek stated that he could consider leaving the EU in future but not in the current situation. Candidates were also asked about the pardon for Jiří Kajínek. None of candidates agreed with the pardon. Only Pavel Fischer declined to answer as he considers the question obsolete.

Candidates were also asked about Russia. Marek Hilšer, Michal Horáček and Pavlel Fischer answered they consider Russia the biggest threat to the Czech Republic while Mirek Topolánek, Jiří Drahoš and Vratislav Kulhánek disagreed. Hilšer stated that candidates that do not consider Russia the biggest security threat have business interests there. Topolánek called Hilšer's words a cheap move. Hilšer stated that Russia is dangerous through hybrid war and could influence a possible referendum about Czech membership in European Union. Drahoš stated that he sees North Korea as a bigger threat than Russia. Topolánek stated that Czechs are a bigger security threat to themselves because they are unable to build a proper army that could defend the country. He also stated that terrorism and Islamism is a bigger threat than Russia. He stated that the Czech Republic only needs Russian markets but does not need Russian imperialism. Kulhánek considers poverty in some African and Asian regions the biggest threat to the Czech Republic because it leads to uncontrollable immigration. Horáček stated that he considers Russia the biggest threat. Fischer stated that NATO should take Russian seriously.

The last question was about security measures at the Prague Castle. All candidates believe these measures are too excessive. Candidates stated they will endorse Zeman's opponent in the second round.

=== Liberec Library debate ===
The debate was held on 16 November 2017. All candidates with exception of Miloš Zeman debated in Liberec Library. The debate was held by DVTV. DVTV then held a survey on Twitter to decide which candidate was the most convincing. Mirek Topolánek received the highest number of votes.

Topolánek stated that the first Czech Republic ends and Second Czech Republic will start. Candidates talked about government formation. Drahoš stated that he would not approach government formation the same way as Miloš Zeman while Hannig stated that he would approach the same way as Zeman. Topolánek stated he considers Andrej Babiš a danger for progress since Velvet Revolution but would approach him professionally. Hynek stated that he would cooperate with Babiš. Candidates then talked about a case of racist comments to a photo of students from Teplice Elementary. Hannig was the only candidate to not have problem with it. Drahoš stated that he does not think Czech people are racist but some politicians spread fear.

Fischer was asked about competences of President. He stated that he would not touch the constitution. Hannig stated that would not have problem with a Semi-presidential system. Horáček then criticised security measures at Prague Castle. Drahoš and Hynek criticised Zeman. Topolánek stated that president's health should be known to public because he is the commander-in-chief of the Military of the Czech Republic. Hannig disagreed.

=== Hynek - Hannig Duel ===
Jiří Hynek and Petr Hannig participated in a debate by Seznam Zprávy on 27 November 2017.

=== University of West Bohemia ===
Debate at University of West Bohemia was held on 28 November 2017. Jiří Drahoš, Michal Horáček, Marek Hilšer, Jiří Hynek, Pavel Fischer, Petr Hannig and Mirek Topolánek participated in the debate.

=== Horáček - Hynek Duel ===
Duel between Michal Horáček and Jiří Hynek was held on 5 December 2017. According to a survey on Twitter, Horáček won the debate.

=== Topolánek - Hilšer Duel ===
Seznam news held a presidential duel between Topolánek and Hilšer on 8 December 2017. Hilšer attacked Topolánek for his past and tried to make a parallel between Topolánek and Miloš Zeman. Topolánek dismissed his claims and stated that he is not linked with Zeman by political opinions. Topolánek also stated he has political experience and knows how politics work. Candidates also argued about migrant quotas. According to a survey on Twitter, Topolánek won the debate.

=== Světozor Debate ===
Debate in Světozor Kino was held on 11 December 2017. Drahoš, Hannig, Hilšer, Horáček and Hynek participated. Topolánek, Kulhánek and Fischer refused because they had a different schedule.

=== Drahoš - Fischer Duel ===
Jiří Drahoš and Pavel Fischer met for a duel at Seznam News on 12 December 2017. Fischer doubted Drahoš' competency to be a president. Drahoš disagreed with his opinion and defended himself with sport terminology. There were a surveys on Twitter and Facebook to decide who won. Fischer received more votes. Fischer stated after the duel that he expected a strong rival but did not get him.

=== Drahoš/Horáček Duel ===
Jiří Drahoš and Michal Horáček faced each other in a duel on 19 December 2017. Horáček attacked Drahoš' campaign finances and highlighted that he finances is campaign by himself. Horáček also tried to examine Drahoš' knowledge of English language. Drahoš tried to attack Horáček for his previous attacks against him. Seznam News had survey on Facebook and Twitter. Horáček won the debate according to these surveys.

PR expert Jiří Mikeš stated that Drahoš was better visually but Horáček had better arguments. He stated that both of them had good showings but the debate showed that Drahoš and Horáček are not prepared for a heavyweight battle with Zeman. Mirek Topolánek is the only candidate that could battle with Zeman according to Mikeš. Sociologist Vojtěch Bednář stated that the debate showed Drahoš' handicap as he comes from Academic environment and is not prepared for a conflict. It could be a problem for him as he will face sharper guys than Horáček is. He still stated that it is hard to decide who won.

=== Horáček/Topolánek Duel ===
Michal Horáček and Mirek Topolánek faced each other in a duel organised by Seznam News on 20 December 2017. Horáček stated that he does not consider Topolánek an honest man. Topolánek disagreed and stated that everybody who knows him and worked with him consider him an honest man who keeps his word. Horáček mentioned Helena Třeštíková who was a member of Topolánek's cabinet and does not think that Topolánek keeps his word. Topolánek stated that it happened differently and that Třeštíková did not have an idea who is governing about and she had to leave his cabinet because she psychically collapsed. Horáček also mentioned Topolánek's coworker Dalík. Topolánek stated that court case with Marek Dalík did not seem really correct to him. He stated that he does not know what would Horáček do if a friend of his would be sentenced to prison. He then noted that Horáček often use informations from Newspapers and mentioned that politician should be able to face pressure from media. Topolánek mentioned that Horáček often calls himself independent because he finances his campaign by himself but these mone come from gambling business. He stated that people lost this moneand did not give it to him. Horáček stated that it is important for directly elected president to be independent of politician and business. He also stated that he is sure that he will defeat Miloš Zeman. Topolánek then noted that Horáček is too emotional. Topolánek mentioned that he left politics 8 years ago. Horáček then mentioned affairs linked to Topoláneks cabinet and stated that many public orders did not go through tender. Topolánek replied that Horáček is very wrong and stated that orders underwent tender but were criticised for its price. Horáček stated that he opposes hard core of European Union and is against migrant quotas. Topolánek stated that the Czech Republic does not have an alternative to European Union but it is visible that the European Union goes somewhere where the Czech Republic does not want to go. Horáček then attacked Topolánek for law about Solar panels. Topolánek stated that the problem showed up during Jan Fischer's Cabinet and he was not even a member of parliament at the time. He stated that Jan Fischer failed to solve the problem. There is a survey on Twitter and Facebook to decide who won the debate. Topolánek received more votes on Twitter while Horáček received more votes on Facebook.

=== Drahoš/Topolánek Duel ===
Jiří Drahoš and Mirek Topolánek faced each other in a duel organised by Seznam News on 21 December 2017. Drahoš attacked Topolánek about formation of his cabinet as it was supported by 2 MPs who left opposition Czech Social Democratic Party. Topolánek stated that he had to solve 2006 situation when left wing parties and centre-right parties both received 100 seats. Drahoš then attacked Topolánek that he failed as a leader of the Civic Democratic Party and did not defeat "Godfathers" within the party. Topolánek stated that Drahoš is wrong and stated he started processes that concluded under leadership of Petr Fiala. Topolánek also disagreed with Drahoš' statement that his cabinet did not support science adequately and supported it with a graph. Drahoš still disagreed that Topolánek's cabinet should have supported science more. Topolánek mentioned that he was head of the Council of science and supported it. Topolánek opened a topic of European migrant crisis and mentioned that Drahoš signed under Science proclamation from 2015. Topolánek called it an "invitation letter." Drahoš stated that he does not consider it an invitation letter and attacked Topolánek that he entered campaign late and might have slept somewhere. Topolánek countered and stated that he has not slept but focused on a topic of migrant crisis very long time and has written many articles for Echo24 but Drahoš most likely does not read. There is a survey on Twitter and Facebook to decide who won the debate. Topolánek received more votes in both polls.

=== First ladies among us ===
Debate of candidates' wives is held on 5 January 2018. Bohumila Bračíková (Vratislav Kulhánek), Eva Drahošová (Jiří Drahoš), Klára Fischerová (Pavel Fischer), Monika Hilšerová (Marek Hilšer), Michaela Hořejší-Horáčková (Michal Horáček), Eliška Hynková (Jiří Hynek) and Lucie Talmanová (Mirek Topolánek).

== Second round debates ==
Zeman agreed to participate in debates for the second round. On 15 January, Zeman suggested that he and Drahoš should participate in four debates. Drahoš said that he would participate in only two debates, to spend his time focusing on a personal campaign in regions where he had received fewer votes.

=== TV Prima Duel ===
The first duel was broadcast on Prima TV on 23 January. The debate was very aggressive and influenced by the loud audience. First topic focused on government formation. Drahoš stated that he would not nominate criminally prosecuted Prime Minister while Zeman stated that he will nominate Andrej Babiš as the victor of legislative election. He noted that Babiš has not been convicted and presumption of innocence applies to him. Candidates then talked about a ban of smoking in restaurants. Drahoš noted that he would support exceptions for small pubs. Candidates strongly disagreed with each other on the topic of Fake news. Zeman stated that he is against limitations of freedom of speech on the internet. Zeman also attacked Drahoš for his claims that elections in the Czech Republic were influenced by foreign powers.

Zeman was described as more energetic, while Drahoš was said to be faint and visibly nervous. Experts expressed the opinion that Zeman had dominated the debate and appeared as the victor. According to poll by Median 59% of people considered Zeman the victor while 13% believed that Drahoš won the debate.

=== Česká televize duel ===
Drahoš improved his performance during the Czech Television debate on 25 January which was seen by 2.6 million TV-spectators. The debate was calmer and Drahoš was considered to be less uncertain and more aggressive than during the previous debate. The second debate was considered a tie by most commentators. Several experts rated the performance of Drahoš in Czech TV as weaker than the one of his opponent. The media lecturer from the Metropolitan University even claimed that Drahoš had lost the debate in the opening minutes, while the political scientist from the CEVRO Institute, on the other hand, was the only expert who considered Drahoš to be the winner of the debate.

== Polls/Surveys ==
This section lists surveys or polls about who was the most convincing in each debate.

Date	Debate	Conducted by	Sample	Miloš Zeman	Jiří Drahoš	Mirek Topolánek	Michal Horáček	Vratislav Kulhánek	Pavel Fischer	Jiří Hynek	Marek Hilšer	Petr Hannig	Source
16 November 2017	Liberec Library	DVTV	3385	—	17.7%	30.16%	23.4%	2.45%	12.67%	5.55%	6.91%	1.15%	
5 December 2017	Horáček/Hynek Duel	Seznam News	493	—	—	—	81%	—	—	19%	—	—	
8 December 2017	Topolánek/Hilšer Duel	Seznam News Twitter	407	—	—	74%	—	—	—	—	26%	—	
8 December 2017	Topolánek/Hilšer Duel	Seznam News FB	321	—	—	52%	—	—	—	—	48%	—	
12 December 2017	Drahoš/Fischer Duel	Seznam News Twitter	260	—	46%	—	—	—	54%	—	—	—	
12 December 2017	Drahoš/Fischer Duel	Seznam News FB	1,200	—	24%	—	—	—	76%	—	—	—	
12 December 2017	Jagello 2000 Debate	iDnes		—	33%	24%	13%	—	13%	—	—	—	
13 December 2017	Hannig/Kulhánek Duel	Seznam News Twitter	29	—	—	—	—	79%	—	—	—	21%	
19 December 2017	Drahoš/Horáček Duel	Seznam News Twitter	810	—	34%	—	66%	—	—	—	—	—	
19 December 2017	Drahoš/Horáček Duel	Seznam News FB	1,700	—	39%	—	61%	—	—	—	—	—	
20 December 2017	Horáček/Topolánek Duel	Seznam News Twitter	1,533	—	—	61%	39%	—	—	—	—	—	
20 December 2017	Horáček/Topolánek Duel	Seznam News FB	2,200	—	—	49%	51%	—	—	—	—	—	
21 December 2017	Drahoš/Topolánek Duel	Seznam News Twitter	587	—	27%	73%	—	—	—	—	—	—	
21 December 2017	Drahoš/Topolánek Duel	Seznam News FB	1,700	—	38%	62%	—	—	—	—	—	—	
23 January 2018	TV Prima Duel	Median		59%	13%	—	—	—	—	—	—	—	
25 January 2018	Česká televize Duel	Median		39%	31%	—	—	—	—	—	—	—	

=== Prezident 21 surveys ===
Date	Debate	Conducted by	Sample	Miloš Zeman	Jiří Drahoš	Mirek Topolánek	Michal Horáček	Vratislav Kulhánek	Pavel Fischer	Jiří Hynek	Marek Hilšer	Petr Hannig	Source
8 November 2017	Charles University, Prague	Prezident 21	588	—	333	36	176	—	128	-12	227	-266	
28 November 2017	University of West Bohemia, Plzeň	Prezident 21	744	—	166	-20	325	10	312	-14	238	-217	
14 December 2017	University of Economics, Prague	Club of Young Political Scientists		—	—	—	176	16	184	-31	146	-115	
20 December 2017	DOX, Prague	Prezident 21	707	—	28	—	258	7	295	24	276	-142	

These surveys use different style. Everyone who voted was allowed to give positive vote to 3 candidates and a negative vote to 1 candidate.
