= Terezie Holovská =

Czech businesswoman and politician

Terezie Holovská (born 9 October 1962) is a Czech businesswoman and politician. She ran an unsuccessful campaign to become a candidate for the 2018 and 2023 Czech presidential election.

== Biography ==
Holovská was born in 1962. A member of the Civic Democratic Party, she became Deputy Mayor of Prague 8 following the 1998 municipal election. She resigned in 2000 over a dispute with people active in education. She was also accused of illicit enrichment. Holovská subsequently focused on her business activities, calling herself an "alchemist". She became close to the Czech Pirate Party, whose leader Ivan Bartoš suggested her as a possible candidate for the 2018 presidential election.

Holovská announced her candidacy to become Czech president on 28 November 2017. She sought nominations from female members of the parliament. Despite failing to receive any nominations, she submitted her nomination papers signed by one citizen, but was disqualified as she had not fulfilled the required number of signatures. On 29 November 2017, Holovská filed a lawsuit against the candidacies of Petr Hannig, Marek Hilšer, Jiří Hynek, Vratislav Kulhánek and Mirek Topolánek, requesting these candidates to be disqualified because some MPs and Senators had nominated more than one candidate, in possible violation of electoral law. On 13 December 2017, Holovská's lawsuit was rejected by the Court. Holovská then submitted her complaint to the Constitutional Court. The Constitutional Court rejected Holovská's complaint on 3 January 2018.

Holovská also attempted to run for the Senate during the Trutnov by-election in 2018, but was again disqualified for failing to receive sufficient nominations. Holovská was later reinstated as a candidate by the court. She received 150 votes, finishing last.

Holovská also submitted candidacy papers for the 2023 Czech presidential election, but was again disqualified.
