= HH21 =

HH21, HH-21, HH 21, HH.21, may refer to:

- Piasecki HH-21, a variant of the Piasecki H-21 helicopter
- HH21, one of the Hamburger–Hamilton stages in chick development
- FLRT3, leucine-rich repeat transmembrane protein 3, also called "HH21"

== See also ==
- HH (disambiguation)
- H21 (disambiguation)
- H (disambiguation)
