= Kroměříž Proclamation =

The Kroměříž Proclamation was a petition initiative started on 21 May 2016 by Michael Kocáb, with the aim of finding a candidate for the 2018 Czech presidential election who could defeat incumbent Miloš Zeman. Jiří Ovčáček, Zeman's spokesman, said that the Kroměříž Proclamation was a "kiss of death" for any candidate who ran with its support. It was signed by more than 11,000 people.

The Proclamation originally intended to support Michal Horáček, but he declined. Jiří Pospíšil was later speculated to be the Proclamation's candidate. Petr Kolář was also considered. The Proclamation announced on 15 December 2016 that potential candidates included Marek Hilšer, Petr Pithart and Pavel Fischer. Only Hilšer indicated that he could accept the Proclamation's support.

The Proclamation organised debates between potential candidates during 2017. Jiří Pospíšil agreed to participate.

Jiří Pospíšil and Petr Kolář were considered the most promising candidates, but both decided to not run. Pavel Fischer and Marek Hilšer eventually ran with the support of the proclamation, but finished third and fifth respectively and did not progress to the run-off. Václav Němec admitted that Proclamation had been unsuccessful.
