= H21 =

H21 or H-21 may refer to:

- British NVC community H21, a type of heath community in the British National Vegetation Classification
- Highway H21 (Ukraine)
- HMS H21, a Royal Navy H-class submarine
- HMS Scimitar (H21), a Royal Navy S-class destroyer
- Mata Hari (1876–1917), German spy code named H-21
- Piasecki H-21, an American helicopter
- Institute H21, a Czech think tank that created the website Prezident 21
