= Alliance for the Future (Czech Republic) =

Alliance for the Future Aliance pro budoucnost
- Abbreviation: APB
- Leader: Pavel Sehnal
- Deputy leader: Zdeněk Somr
- Founder: Pavel Sehnal
- Founded: 19 September 2016
- Headquarters: Pacovská 2104/1; 140 00 Prague
- Membership (2017): 150
- Ideology: Conservative liberalism Green politics Pro-Europeanism
- Political position: Centre-right
- Colours: Blue

Website
- alianceprobudoucnost.cz

Alliance for the Future (Czech: Aliance pro budoucnost, APB) is a political party in the Czech Republic, established in 2016 as the Civic Democratic Alliance (ODA). It considers itself to be successor of the previous Civic Democratic Alliance. It was established in September 2016 by current leader Pavel Sehnal, and former Prime Minister Petr Nečas is also involved with the party. The party participated in the 2017 legislative election and plans to participate in the 2018 municipal election. The leaders of the original Civic Democratic Alliance are not involved with the party.

== Ideology ==
ODA is a conservative-liberal centre-right party. It supports the European Union and multiculturalism.

== History ==
The party was founded in December 2016 by Pavel Sehnal, CEO of SPGroup. The company is closely linked with the party and leading associates of the company became key members of the party. Sehnal said that the party is a successor to the original Civic Democratic Alliance.

On 29 June 2017, ODA announced Vratislav Kulhánek as its presidential candidate for the 2018 presidential election, and started gathering signatures.

On 17 July 2017, ODA announced that it would participate in the 2017 legislative election, co-operating with a political movement For Health and Sport.

In August 2017, ODA started working with a controversial YouTuber, Mikael Oganesjan, and controversial agency Plavec Media. This was criticised in the media. The negative response on social media caused Sehnal to end the collaboration.

== Election results ==
=== Chamber of Deputies ===
Year	Leader	Vote	Vote %	Seats	Place	Government
2017	Pavel Sehnal	8,030	0.15	0 / 200	19th	Extra-parliamentary
2021	Pavel Sehnal	11,531	0.21	0 / 200	14th	Extra-parliamentary

=== Senate ===
Election	First round			Second round			Seats	Total seats	+/–
Election	Votes	%	Place	Votes	%	Place	Seats	Total seats	+/–
2026	2,108	0.18	39th				0 / 27	0 / 81	New

=== Presidential ===
Election	Candidate	First round result			Second round result		
Election	Candidate	Votes	%Votes	Result	Votes	%Votes	Result
2018	Vratislav Kulhánek	24,442	0.47	9th place			
