= 2018 Czech presidential election =

- 12–13 January 2018 (first round); 26–27 January 2018 (second round)
- Turnout: 61.88% (first round) ▲0.61 pp; 66.57% (second round) ▲7.49 pp
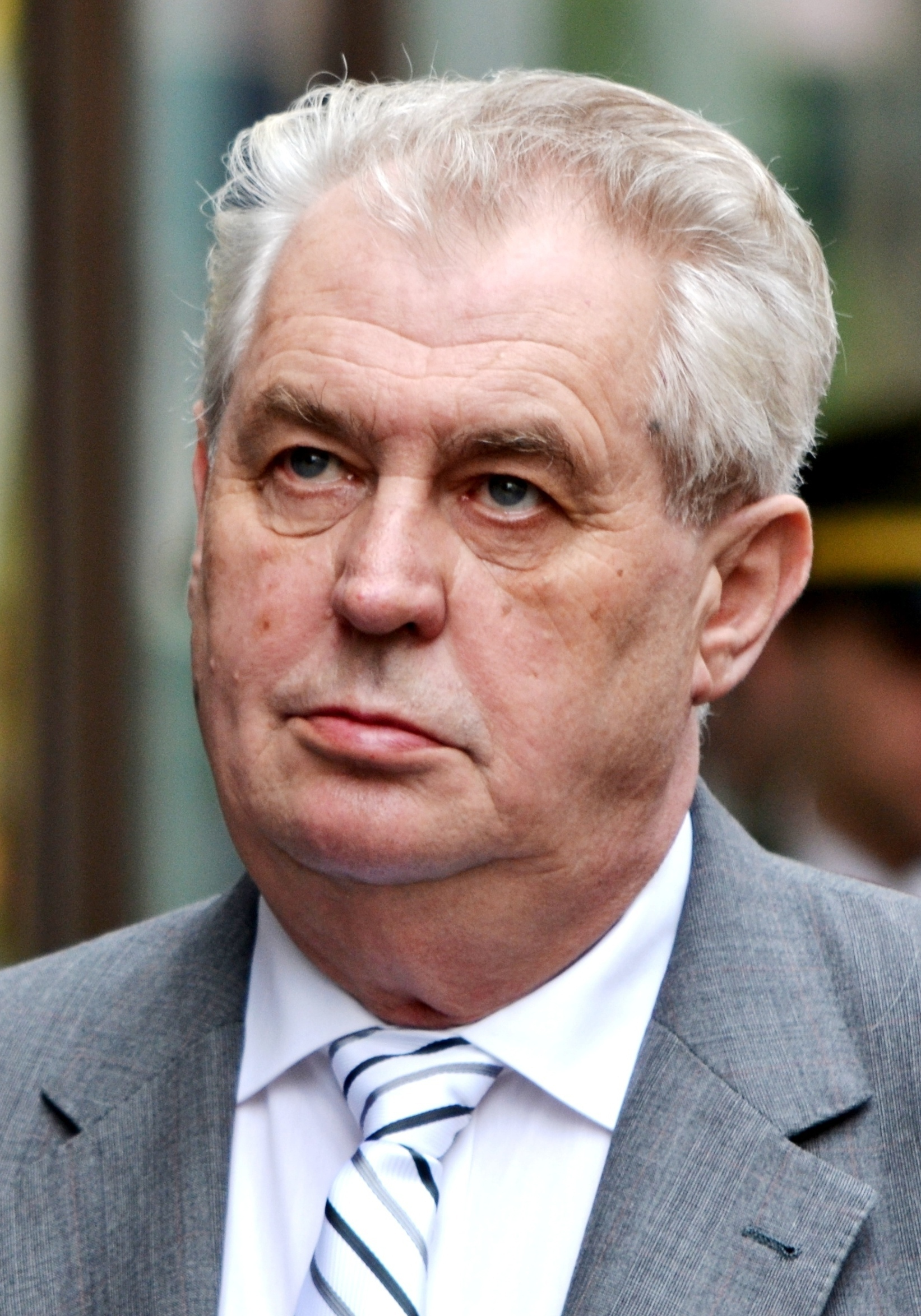

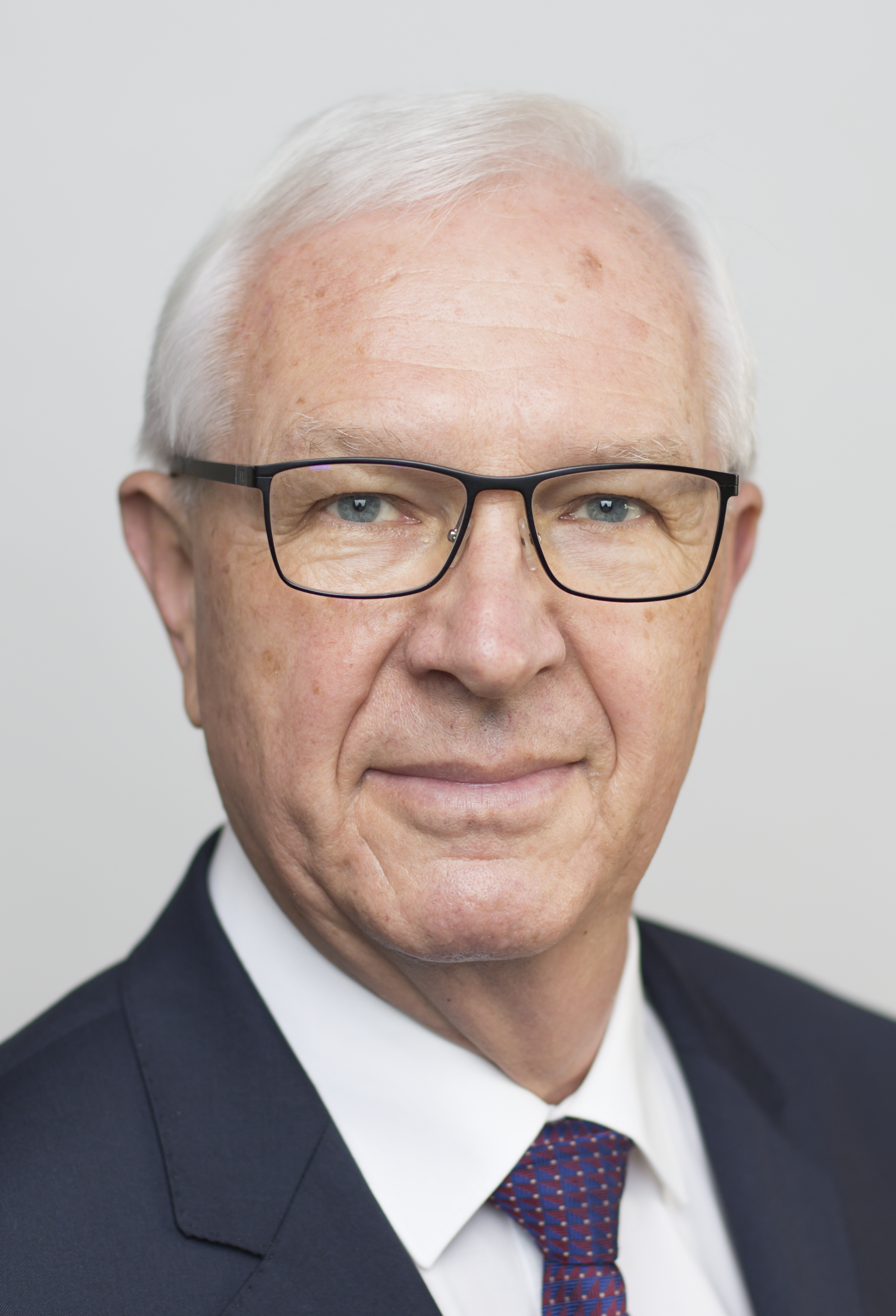
Candidate	Miloš Zeman	Jiří Drahoš
Party	SPO	Independent
Popular vote	2,853,390	2,701,206
Percentage	51.37%	48.63%
President before election
Miloš Zeman
SPO
Elected President
Miloš Zeman
SPO

Presidential elections were held in the Czech Republic in January 2018. The first round took place on 12 and 13 January. As no candidate won a majority, a run-off election between the top two candidates, Jiří Drahoš and President Miloš Zeman, was held on 26 and 27 January 2018.

In the first round, voters chose between nine candidates who qualified for the elections either by gathering 50,000 signatures from the public, 10 signatures from Senators or 20 signatures from members of the Chamber of Deputies (MPs). Incumbent president Miloš Zeman, running for re-election for his second and last term, finished first with 38.57%, followed by former president of the Czech Academy of Sciences Jiří Drahoš, who received 26.60%.

In the second round, Miloš Zeman narrowly defeated Drahoš and was elected for a second term in office. Voter turnout was 66.60%, the highest since the 1998 legislative elections.

== Background ==
Former prime minister Miloš Zeman was elected as President of the Czech Republic in 2013, defeating Minister of Foreign Affairs Karel Schwarzenberg in the country's first direct presidential elections. Until 2012, all presidential elections in the Czech Republic were indirect, with the president being chosen by the Parliament of the Czech Republic.

According to polls conducted in 2016, Zeman was the front-runner and his chances of re-election were considered high, although it was speculated that Zeman's candidacy would be determined by his health. Zeman announced his candidacy on 9 March 2017. There was speculation that both the Social Democrats (ČSSD) and ANO may endorse Zeman, but neither party did in the end. Some commentators speculated that Zeman could be elected in the first round.

On 23 August 2017, the Speaker of the Senate announced that the first round would be held on 12 and 13 January 2018, with a second round being held on 26 and 27 January 2018, if required. The deadline for nominating candidates was scheduled for 7 November 2017.

== Candidates ==
In order to qualify for the ballot, candidates must gather 50,000 signatures from citizens, or the support of twenty Deputies or ten Senators. The candidates must file their applications and signatures 66 days before the election, following which the Interior Ministry will verify a sample of the signatures.

19 candidates submitted themselves as candidates. Only nine of them met requirements for registration and became official candidates: Jiří Drahoš, Pavel Fischer, Petr Hannig, Marek Hilšer, Michal Horáček, Jiří Hynek, Vratislav Kulhánek, Mirek Topolánek and Miloš Zeman.

=== Official candidates ===
Nine candidates gathered the required number of signatures and had their candidacy approved by the Ministry of the Interior. Candidates are listed according to number allocated by the Ministry.

Candidate name and age, (Note: Inauguration day is set as the last possible date for person to become President.) political party		Office(s) held	Details
Mirek Topolánek	Mirek Topolánek (61); Independent supported by ODS	Prime Minister (2006–2009); Leader of the Civic Democratic Party (2002–2010) Other offices: Member of the Chamber of Deputies from 2006 to 2009; Senator from Ostrava from 1996 to 2004	Running as number 1 with support from 10 Senators – Speculation about Topolánek's candidacy started in November 2017 when Václav Klaus Jr. mentioned that Topolánek was seeking the party's support. He announced his candidacy on 5 November 2017, which was viewed by some experts as a potential major turning point in the campaign. He ran with the support of ODS and SsČR.
Michal Horáček	Michal Horáček (65); Independent	None	Running as number 2 with 86,940 signatures from the public – After a period of speculation, Horáček announced on 7 October 2016 that he had decided to run for president. His slogan was: "We can do better." In early 2017 Horáček was considered the main rival to Zeman.
	Pavel Fischer (52); Independent	Ambassador to France (2003–2010)	Running as number 3 with support from 17 Senators – Fischer announced his candidacy on 4 October 2017.
Jiří Hynek	Jiří Hynek (57); Realists	Chairman of the Association for Weapons and Defense Industry (since 2011)	Running as number 4 with support from 29 MPs – Hynek announced his candidacy on 21 August 2017, as the candidate of the Realists political party.
Petr Hannig	Petr Hannig (71); Party of Common Sense supported by ND, RSČMS, ZpL, KSH, ČHNJ, DSZ	Leader of the Party of Common Sense (since 2002)	Running as number 5 with support from 26 MPs – Hannig announced his candidacy on 19 July 2017. On 26 October 2017, he announced that he had been nominated by 20 MPs.
	Vratislav Kulhánek (74); Civic Democratic Alliance	CEO of Škoda Auto (1997–2004); President of the Czech Ice Hockey Association (2004–2008)	Running as number 6 with support from 24 MPs – On 29 June 2017, the Civic Democratic Alliance (ODA) announced Kulhánek as its candidate. Although the party does not have any MPs or Senators, he managed to secure nomination by 23 MPs, after failing to gather sufficient signatures from the public.
President Miloš Zeman	Miloš Zeman (73); Independent supported by SPO	President of the Czech Republic (since 2013); Prime Minister (1998–2002) Other offices: Honorary Chairman of SPO since 2010; Speaker of the Chamber of Deputies from 1996 to 1998; Leader of the Social Democratic Party from 1993 to 2001; Member of the Chamber of Deputies from 1996 to 2002	Running as number 7 with 103,817 signatures from the public – He announced that he would run for a second term on 9 March 2017. His supporters used the slogan "Zeman again!" Opinion polls indicated that he was the front-runner in the first round of the election.
Marek Hilšer	Marek Hilšer (41); Independent	None	Running as number 8 with support from 11 Senators – He announced his candidacy in July 2016, becoming the first declared candidate. Hilšer asked the Senators for support after failing to gather sufficient signatures from the public.
Jiří Drahoš	Jiří Drahoš (68); Independent supported by KDU-ČSL and STAN	President of the Czech Academy of Sciences (2009–2017)	Running as number 9 with 141,234 signatures from the public – He announced his intention to run on 28 March 2017, becoming Zeman's main rival. His candidacy was supported by KDU-ČSL and STAN.

==== Disqualified candidates ====
- Josef Toman, running as an independent, said that he had submitted nomination papers signed by 75,000 people, but was disqualified for not fulfilling the quorum.
- Businesswoman Terezie Holovská announced her candidacy on 31 October 2017.
- Other disqualified candidates were Petr Blaha, Daniel Felkel, Oldřich Fiala, Roman Hladík, Libor Hrančík, David Chadim, Anna Kašná, Martin Ludačka and Karel Světnička.

==== Withdrawn candidates ====
- Former MP Otto Chaloupka announced his candidacy on 10 April 2017, but ended his presidential bid on 7 November 2017 having failed to gather enough signatures.
- Michal Gulyáš, an actor, producer and writer, announced his candidacy on 11 January 2017 but withdrew from the election on 7 February for personal reasons.
- Miroslav Sládek, leader of SPR-RSČ, started collecting signatures, and announced his candidacy on 27 February 2017. On 23 October 2017 he withdrew from the election due to his party's poor results in the 2017 legislative election.
- Businessman Vladimír Boštík announced his candidacy on 30 August 2017.

== Party endorsements ==
Unlike the presidential election in 2013, no major political parties nominated an official candidate. This was attributed to the increasing distrust of political parties among voters. The established major political parties, such as ČSSD, ODS, TOP 09, and KDU-ČSL, were reluctant to risk being defeated in the presidential election, while the protest parties, SPD and ANO, were broadly supportive of Zeman. Opposition parties were also wary of official endorsements of other candidates. In contrast, marginal parties such as Suverenita, Pravý blok, DSSS, and SPOZ nominated candidates to become more visible.

In the first round, Jiří Drahoš ran with the support of the Christian and Democratic Union – Czechoslovak People's Party and Mayors and Independents. Miloš Zeman ran with the support of Freedom and Direct Democracy and the Party of Civic Rights (SPO). On the day before the vote, ANO leader Andrej Babiš also endorsed Zeman. In addition, Topolánek was endorsed by centre-right ODS and the Freeholder Party.

Parties which did not issue any official endorsement included the Party of Free Citizens (Svobodní), TOP 09, the Green Party, the Moravians party, the Communist Party, and the Czech Pirate Party, though several individual politicians endorsed candidates privately. The Social Democrats experienced an internal split over which candidate to endorse, leading to no official party endorsement, but different groups within the party endorsing either Zeman, or Drahoš.

In the second round, Drahoš received further endorsements from ODS and TOP 09.

== Campaign before nominations ==
=== Early campaign ===
Senator Zdeněk Škromach was the first candidate to announce his intention to run, in 2015. In response, Tomáš Halík announced that he would run for president if Škromach did. This led former president Václav Klaus to announce that he would run against Halík if he was running without a strong rival. Škromach, Halík and Klaus all finally declined to run.

On 21 May 2016, former minister Michael Kocáb issued the "Kroměříž Proclamation", with the intention of finding a strong candidate to run against Zeman. Kocáb suggested Michal Horáček, who declined the movement's support but did not rule out running. Horáček mentioned his possible candidacy in April 2016 and some polls indicated that he would be the strongest possible contender to Zeman.

Marek Hilšer launched his campaign in July 2016, with the slogan: "Marek to the Castle." He said he would finance his presidential campaign through a transparent account. Hilšer has negative opinions of Russia and China, and also supports helping immigrants.

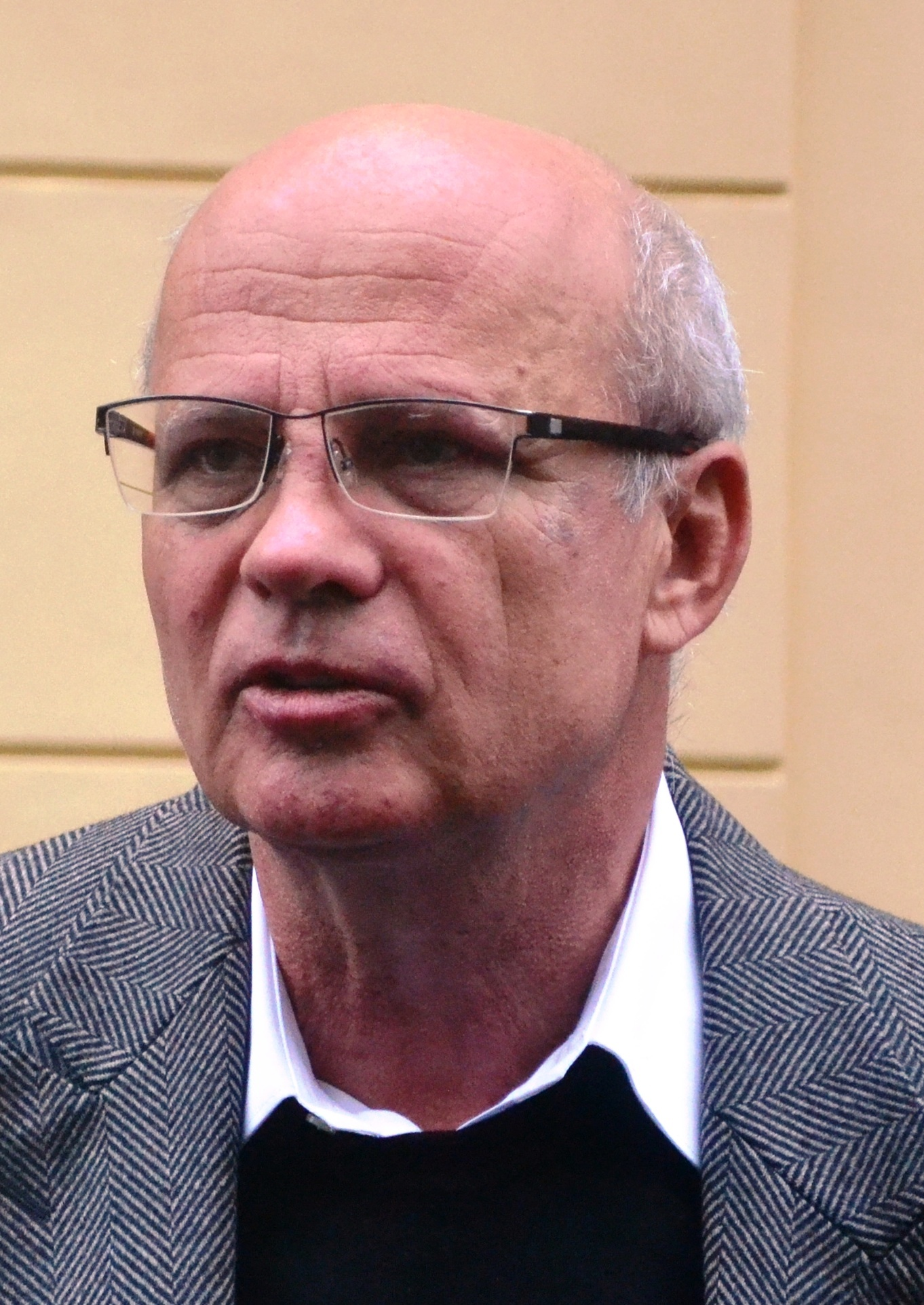
Michal Horáček was Zeman's leading rival according to polls in 2016 and early 2017

Michal Horáček officially launched his campaign on 3 November 2016. A week earlier he had moderated a meeting at Old Town Square, which was considered to be the actual start of his campaign as it was meant to coincide with official celebrations of Czech Statehood Day. Horáček stated that he wanted his campaign to be based on respect for all people and all opinions. He also said that he believed he could win in the first round. TOP 09, STAN and KDU-ČSL were considering supporting Horáček before his campaign started, but none of them did in the end. Horáček also entered into a dispute with TOP 09.

On 21 December 2016, Institute for Democracy 21 launched an interactive web game to choose a presidential candidate. Everyone who voted was allowed to cast three positive votes and one negative vote. Jiří Pánek started as the winning candidate, despite having ruled himself out of running. As of April 2017, Jiří Drahoš is leading the game.

It was reported in January 2017 that Czech political parties had decided to cease preparations for the election until Zeman announced whether he was seeking re-election. Zeman discussed his possible candidacy with close colleagues on 31 January. One of them stated that Zeman was likely to run for re-election, and would announce his decision on 9 March 2017.

On 9 February 2017 Horáček announced his team of his advisers, including Magda Vášáryová, Dana Drábová and Pavel Pefko. In response, Zeman said that Horáček "never says what he thinks. His advisers will talk instead of him." Zeman attended the SPO Congress on 11 February 2017, at which SPO leader Jan Veleba assured Zeman that the party would support his reelection campaign if he decided to run. Zeman visited hospital for a preventive examination after the congress.

On 9 March, the Kroměříž Proclamation started gathering signatures for Marek Hilšer and Petr Kolář.

=== March 2017 ===
Zeman announced his candidacy on 9 March during a meeting with his supporters, and confirmed his decision the next day in a press conference, saying that he had been persuaded by the support of the people. He commented that he did not consider himself the favourite in the election, and also said he would not run a political campaign, attack his rivals, or participate in debates, but would gather the 50,000 signatures required to qualify for the presidential ballot. He also announced that he would appear in a television programme called A week with the President. Michal Horáček criticised Zeman's decision not to participate in presidential debates.

On 13 March, Karel Štogl, a former member of ČSSD who still has links with the party, announced his intention to run and began seeking parliamentary support for his nomination.

Jiří Drahoš, former president of the Czech Academy of Sciences, announced his candidacy on 28 March 2017. Drahoš said he did not want to be the official candidate of any party, but some party leaders expressed their intention to endorse him. Petr Gazdík, the leader of Mayors and Independents, described Drahoš as a great candidate and rival to Zeman, and said he believed he could convince his party to support Drahoš. The leaders of TOP 09 and KDU-ČSL also said they were considering supporting him. ODS leader Petr Fiala refused to comment on Drahoš's candidacy but acknowledged him to be a dignified candidate. Leader of ANO Andrej Babiš said that he considered Drahoš a respectable person but noted that Drahoš did not want the support of any party. In response to the announcement, Zeman's spokesman Jiří Ovčáček described Drahoš as "just a product of PR". He added that in his view the Czech Republic needed "a president who will stand by people in situations such as the migration crisis", not just "a yes man who can deliver empty speeches". Michal Horáček said that Drahoš would be a candidate of political parties and would have to return their support. Drahoš met journalists at the National Technical Library on 30 March 2017. He described himself as an independent candidate who supports the European Union and NATO, and also stated that he would reject a government that included the Communist Party. He also announced plans to gather 50,000 signatures instead of being nominated by lawmakers.

=== April 2017 ===
On 16 April 2017, Michal Horáček started gathering signatures, saying that he believed he could collect the required number within a matter of weeks.

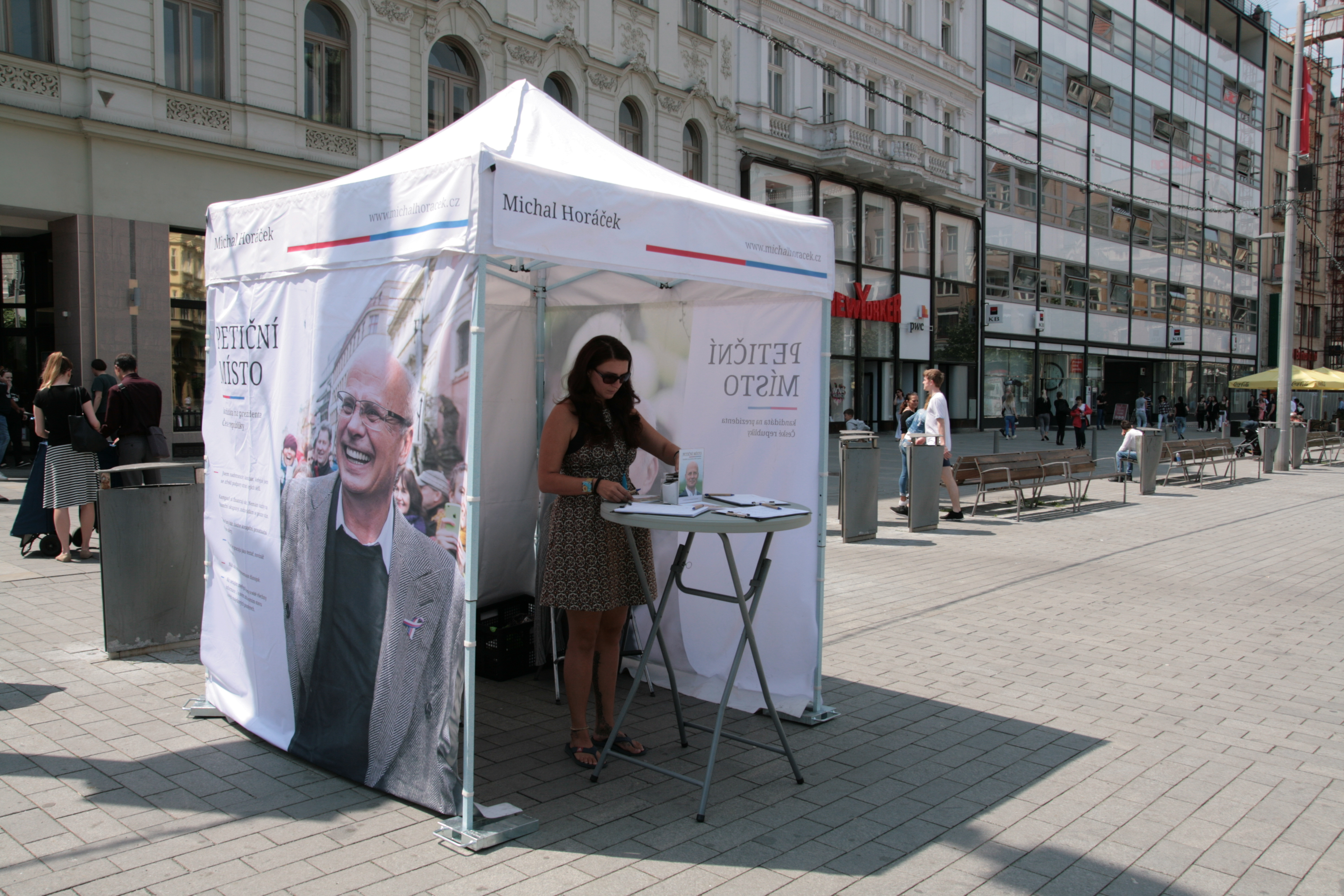
Petitioning for Michal Horáček in Brno.

The Party of Civic Rights (SPO) began Zeman's presidential campaign, under the slogan "Zeman again!" The campaign included some of Zeman's close colleagues, though Zeman himself had stated that he would not campaign. First lady Ivana Zemanová was named head of Zeman's campaign team. SPO started gathering signatures on 24 April 2017.

Jiří Drahoš also started gathering signatures on 24 April 2017, with approximately 500 volunteers. Drahoš also announced that his spokeswoman would be Lenka Pastorčáková, a journalist for Czech Television.

=== May 2017 ===
On 6 May 2017, Horáček announced that he had gathered between 47,000 and 52,000 signatures, with the help of 2,500 supporters. By the same day Marek Hilšer had reached 2,000 signatures.

Prime Minister Bohuslav Sobotka announced on 16 May 2017 that ČSSD would most likely nominate its own candidate for the election instead of supporting Zeman, due to his actions during the government crisis in May 2017. Zeman's spokesman Jiří Ovčáček responded that this was not a surprise because Sobotka had always been lobbying to prevent Zeman's re-election. According to some ČSSD sources, the purpose of fielding a ČSSD candidate would not be to win the election but to weaken Zeman. Some political scientists speculated that Zeman's actions during the crisis could discourage voters from voting him and damage his chances for reelection. On 25 May 2017, Sobotka mentioned Minister of Foreign Affairs Lubomír Zaorálek and Senate Speaker Milan Štěch as possible candidates, adding that ČSSD may decide on a candidate in Summer 2017. Opinion polls conducted after the crisis by Median indicated that Zeman's ratings had dropped by 2%. The same poll also showed Drahoš as Zeman's main rival.

In May 2017, during a visit to China, Miloš Zeman was visibly tired and required assistance from his security detail to walk. His spokesman Jiří Ovčáček attributed this to his demanding program, including ten days of work without any time to rest. His tiredness was also visible at the subsequent NATO summit, when Zeman was absent for speeches by political leaders such as Donald Trump, Jens Stoltenberg, and Angela Merkel, during which he would have been required to stand. These events revived speculation about Zeman's health, with some commentators speculating that Zeman may withdraw from the election. Zeman's doctors said that his program was too exhausting and recommended that Zeman rest for one or two weeks. Zeman adjusted his program as a result.

On 26 May 2017, Jiří Drahoš launched his campaign at a meeting in Opava. He visited employees of a local factory and some retirement homes. On 30 May Drahoš was endorsed by Miroslav Kalousek, leader of TOP 09, though the party itself did not officially endorse him. Drahoš was expected to receive the support of the Populars and Mayors coalition (KDU-ČSL and Mayors and Independents).

=== June 2017 ===
On 1 June 2017, Horáček's spokesman Jiří Táborský announced that Horáček had collected the required number of signatures to stand in the election, but would keep collecting. At the same time Zeman had collected 18,000 signatures, Drahoš had collected 20,000, and Marek Hilšer had collected 5,000. Horáček had been collecting signatures at a rate of 1,000 per day, Zeman and Drahoš at 500 per day, and Hilšer at 160 per day. Horáček had 448 signing posts, Zeman 223, Drahoš 230 and Hilšer 14. By 5 June 2017, Drahoš had gathered 25,000 signatures. On 10 June 2017, Karel Štogl announced that he had the support of ten senators, including ČSSD senator Jan Hajda. Hajda refused to comment on Štogl's statement.

On 26 June 2017, Horáček announced his intention to gather signatures for Drahoš and Hilšer, in order to "make the democratic environment better". Drahoš, who had gathered 30,000 signatures to that point, refused Horáček's help, while Hilšer accepted it.

Vratislav Kulhánek announced his candidacy on 29 June 2017, as the candidate of the Civic Democratic Alliance (ODA), which would collect signatures on his behalf. ODA leader Pavel Sehnal said that Kulhánek was a right-wing candidate, which was something missing in the election. Zeman said that he did not know Kulhánek well but remembered him as a successful manager of Škoda Auto, adding that he had no problem with Kulhánek's candidacy because he believed that it was better to have more candidates.

=== July 2017 ===
On 1 July 2017, Horáček started working with Ewig Public Relations agency, to help with his campaign. On 4 July, the leaders of KDU-ČSL and STAN announced that they would recommend that their parties support Jiří Drahoš. Petr Hannig, leader of far-right party Rozumní, announced his candidacy on 19 July 2017. He was endorsed by other far-right parties such as National Democracy. Hannig said that he wanted to continue with Zeman's policies but behave differently.

By 20 July 2017, Horáček had gathered 65,000 signatures, Zeman 43,000 signatures, Drahoš 35,000 signatures, Hilšer 10,000 signatures (not including signatures gathered by Horáček) and Kulhánek 5,000 signatures. Another prospective candidate, Jaroslav Kubera, had gathered the signatures of 15 Senators, enabling him to be nominated if he decided to run.

=== August 2017 ===
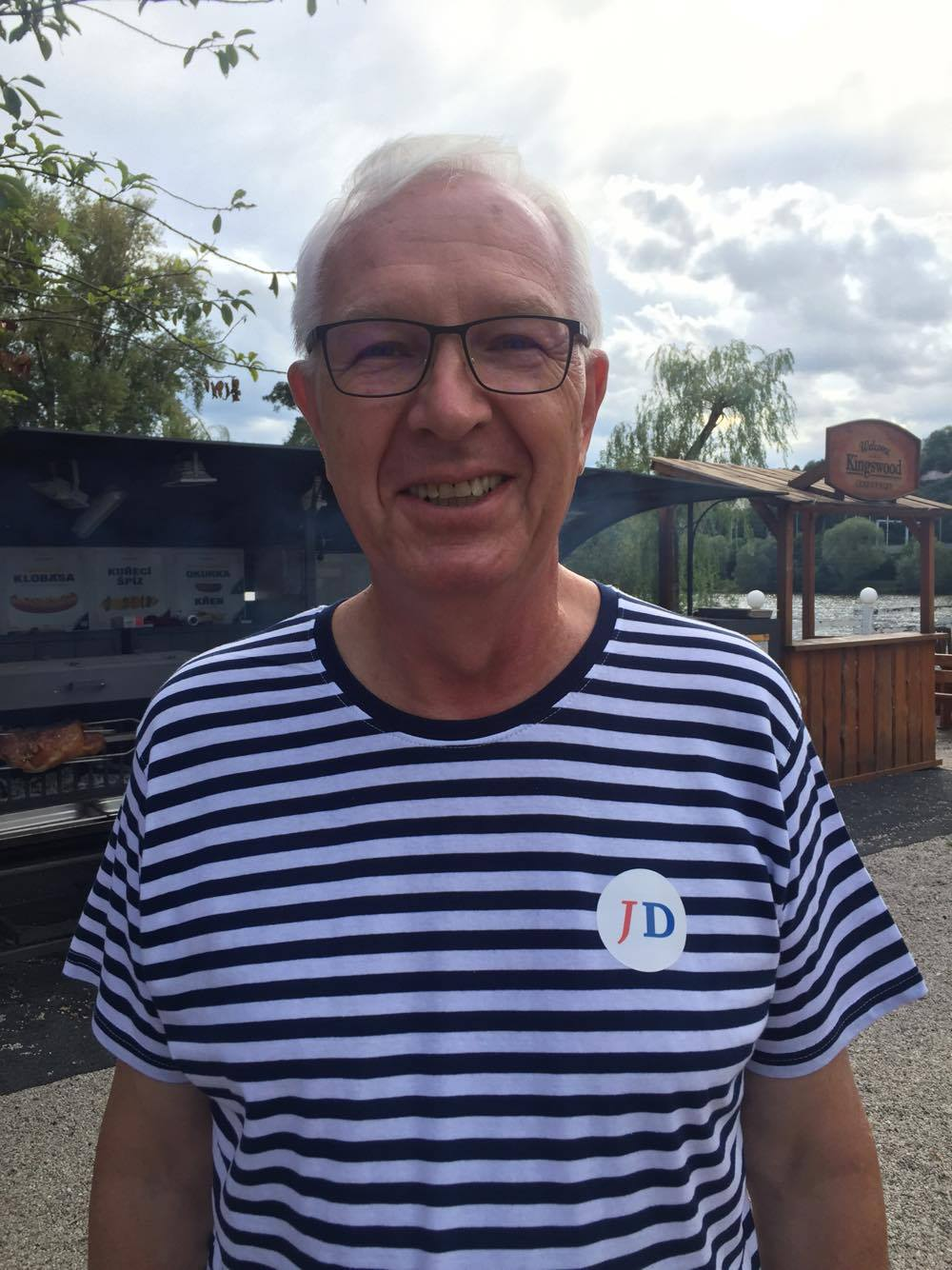
Jiří Drahoš during the campaign for the presidency on 19 August 2017.

On 10 August, SPO leader Jan Veleba announced that Zeman had enough signatures to stand in the election. Hilšer had 15,000 signatures at that point, and Drahoš stated that he would reach the required number of signatures sometime in August or September 2017. On 16 August, Ivana Zemanová announced that Zeman had collected 59,263 signatures. Drahoš had at the time over 40,000 signatures. On 19 August 2017, Drahoš announced he had collected 78,321 signatures.

On 21 August, the Realists announced Jiří Hynek as their candidate. The party started to gather signatures for his candidacy, and also to ask MPs for support. Hynek said that some MPs had already promised to support him.

On 24 August, Zeman appeared in public for the first time in two months, to launch the Agrosalon Earth Breadwinner. His spokesman Ovčáček told journalists that Zeman's health was not a problem. Zeman criticized EU subsidies for decreasing milk production, which he described as an "atrocity".

On 30 August, Businessman Vladimír Boštík announced his candidacy, saying that he had already gathered 63,000 signatures. His campaign motto was "A boy from a village wants to conquer Prague Castle.

=== September 2017 ===
On 24 September, Drahoš announced he had gathered 100,000 signatures. Horáček had 80,000 signatures and Hilšer 30,000 signatures. Kulhánek announced that he did not have enough signatures and started to seek support from MPs.

=== October 2017 ===
On 4 October, Pavel Fischer announced his candidacy, adding that he had gathered the signatures of 10 senators, allowing him to run. Fischer announced his candidacy on Václav Havel's birthday, and said that he would like to be a president similar to Havel. On 10 October, Drahoš called on the incoming government to draw up a plan for the adoption of the Euro currency.

On 13 October, Drahoš announced that he would stop gathering new signatures; by 15 October he had gathered 110,000 signatures. However, he continued collecting for almost a month longer. On 17 October Jiří Hynek announced that he had submitted his nomination with the signatures of 22 MPs. Hynek said that he had gathered 15,000 signatures from the public, but he had started gathering them too late. On 18 October Kulhánek announced that he had been nominated by 23 MPs, and submitted his nomination on the same day. By 26 October, Petr Hannig had received the support of 20 MPs. Mayors and Independents endorsed Drahoš on 31 October, and called for other parties to do the same.

=== November 2017 ===
Terezie Holovská announced her candidacy on 2 November, asking 44 female MPs for nomination. Marek Hilšer announced he had received nominations from 11 senators. Drahoš submitted his nomination on 3 November, with 142,000 signatures.

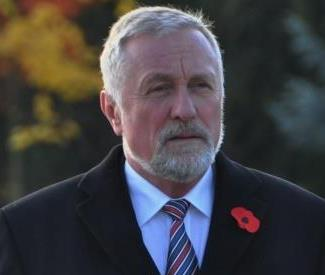
Former Czech Prime Minister Mirek Topolánek announced his candidacy on 5 November 2017

On 4 November, media started to speculate that former Czech Prime Minister Mirek Topolánek could run for the office. Some media reported that Topolánek had asked Senators of the Civic Democratic Party (ODS) for support and also discussed his candidacy with the leader of the party. On 5 November, Topolánek confirmed his candidacy, stating that he was seeking the support of Senators from all parties. Some Civic Democrat politicians endorsed his candidacy. Leader of ANO Andrej Babiš attacked Topolánek, describing him as the most corrupt Czech Prime Minister. Topolánek's candidacy was also criticised by Jiří Drahoš, who commented that Topolánek represented the same thing as Zeman - rudeness and lack of respect for his opponents. He called Topolánek's candidacy a "bad joke". By 6 November Topolánek had gathered enough signatures to run. ODS endorsed Topolánek on the same day. Some media commentators and political scientists predicted that he could become the main rival to Zeman. Topolánek quickly became the third strongest candidate, overtaking Michal Horáček in opinion polls.

On 6 November, Zeman submitted his nomination, with 113,038 signatures. Zeman denied speculation about his health and refused to comment on his rivals.

== Official campaign ==
=== Nominations closed ===
Nominations were closed on 7 November 2017. 19 candidates submitted their nominations in time, but on 10 November the Interior Ministry announced that only nine candidates met the requirements for the nomination: Miloš Zeman, Jiří Drahoš, Mirek Topolánek, Michal Horáček, Vratislav Kulhánek, Jiří Hynek, Petr Hannig, Pavel Fischer and Marek Hilšer. The other candidates were disqualified for not meeting the nomination requirements.

Mirek Topolánek held a press conference on 7 November after nominations were closed, saying that he wanted to be a "strong, democratic and political candidate", adding that he had been motivated to stand by Zeman's meeting with Andrej Babiš in Lány. He stated that "Zeman should go down in history as the Prime Minister who brought the Czech Republic into NATO rather than as a president who violated constitutional conventions". Topolánek also introduced his team, consisting of Dana Makrlíková, Gabriela Kloudová, Dalibor Veřmiřovský and Edvard Kožušník. Public relations expert Jakub Horák joined Topolánek's team on 9 November 2017. Horák had managed the successful campaign for the Pirate Party in the October 2017 legislative election.

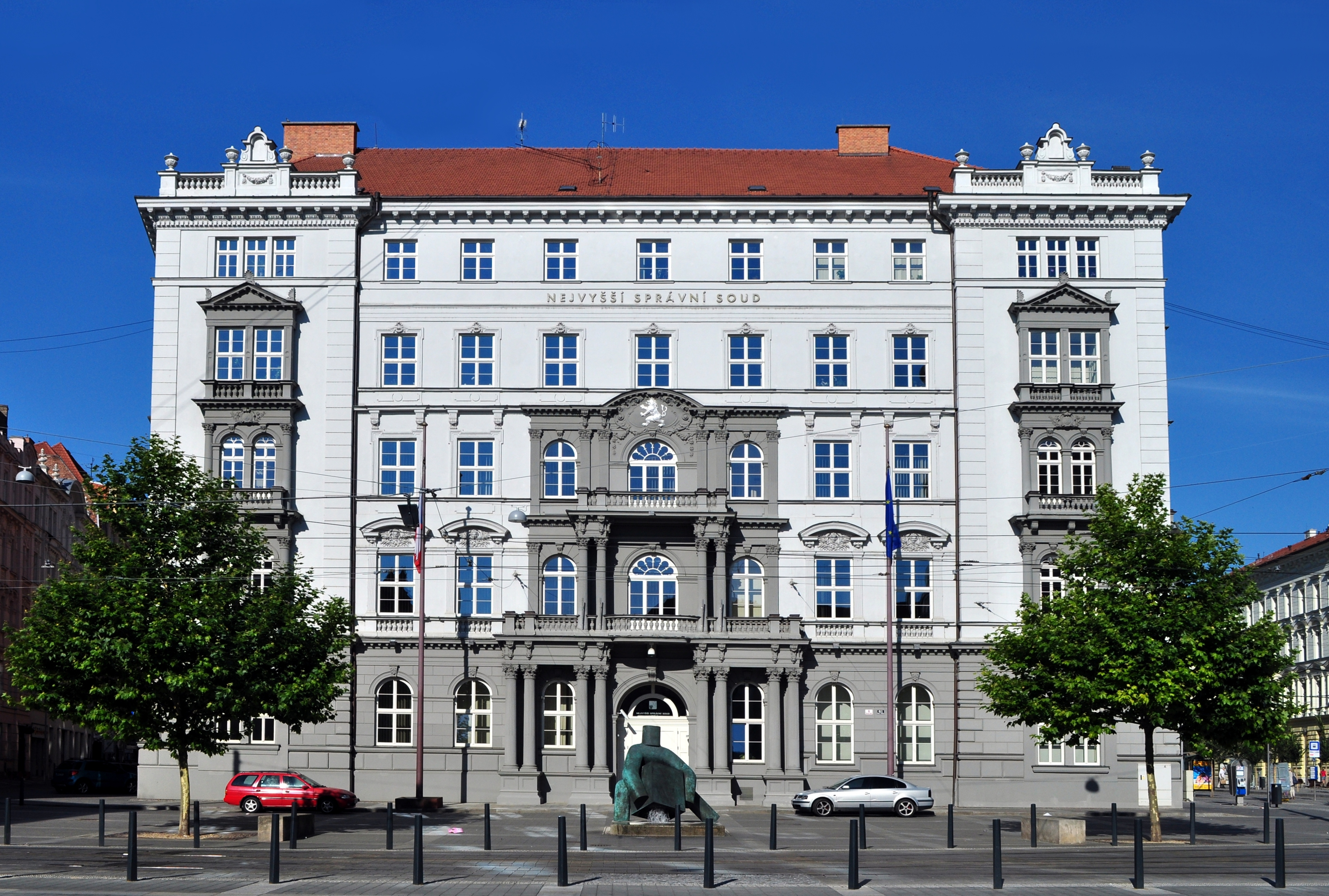
The Supreme Administrative Court had to decide whether to disqualify five candidates. It ruled that the candidates are permitted to run.

After the nominations were closed, some constitutional lawyers noted that some Senators and MPs had nominated more than one candidate, which could be against the law. The Ministry of Internal Affairs had interpreted the law as allowing legislators to support more than one candidate, and published this interpretation online, which candidates and Senators then followed. Candidates at risk from the mistake by the Ministry included Topolánek, Hannig and Hynek. Jan Kysela commented that he doubted the court would disqualify these candidates, because they would be punishing them for a mistake that was made by someone else.

On 14 November, KDU-ČSL endorsed Drahoš. Some candidates appeared at the Festival of Freedom on 17 November to commemorate the Velvet Revolution. Drahoš, Hilšer and Fischer all made speeches, but organisers refused to allow Topolánek or Michal Horáček to take part, stating that they wanted to give a platform to candidates who were in accordance with the values of 17 November. This angered Horáček, who had been a direct participant in the events of 17 November 1989.

Terezie Holovská filed a lawsuit against the candidacies of Hannig, Hilšer, Hynek, Kulhánek and Topolánek, arguing that they should be disqualified because some MPs and Senators had nominated more than one candidate. Holovská had previously sought nomination from MPs but failed to attract sufficient nominations and was disqualified.

Pavel Fischer launched his campaign on 30 November, with the slogan "I know how to do it". Fischer said he wanted to return the Czech Republic to the world map. Topolánek also launched his campaign on the same day, criticising Zeman's policies and calling for an active role in NATO and the EU. He said that "the Czech Republic needs someone who knows how to play hard". Topolánek rejected migrant quotas and adoption of the Euro, though he stated that there was no alternative to the European Union.

=== December 2017 ===
On 1 December, Drahoš expressed fears that Russia could influence the election, and met Prime Minister Bohuslav Sobotka to discuss the matter. He also expressed his belief that Russia influenced the 2017 legislative election. The Security Information Service (BIS) released a statement dismissing Drahoš' claims. Zeman criticised Drahoš for spreading "conspiracy theories". Topolánek commented that Drahoš had shown he did not know much about politics, and called for a televised debate between him and Drahoš, as that couldn't be manipulated by foreign propaganda. On 9 December, Zeman appeared at a Freedom and Direct Democracy (SPD) conference and received indirect support from the party.

On 13 December the Supreme Administrative Court rejected Holovská's lawsuit. The court confirmed that MPs and Senators could sign only one candidacy, but ruled that all candidates could participate in the election.

Horáček attacked the nomination of Communist MP Zdeněk Ondráček to head the Permanent Commission of the Chamber of Deputies of oversight over the General Inspection of Security Forces. Ondráček had been a member of the Communist police that attacked demonstrators in 1989. This led Horáček into a Twitter exchange with Topolánek, who also disagreed with Ondráček's nomination but described Horáček's comments as "a theatre". He noted that Ondráček used to be a member of a permanent commission with oversight over the BIS, which was more serious but had received no comment from Horáček. Horáček said that he was running to change things and attacked Topolánek for his past and for his links with former co-worker Marek Dalík. (Note: In 2009, the public relations expert and Czech lobbyist Marek Dalík was the tenant in an Italian Villa located at Monte Argentario with its lease signed by Markus Hasler, who lives in Ruggell, Liechtenstein and works as an attorney with Graham Smith. According to Robert Eringer, both Smith and Hasler are associated with Vladimir Putin through a Monaco based firm Sotrama. Beginning in the 1990s, Graham Smith opened and managed numerous bank accounts in Liechtenstein for the benefit of the City of Saint Petersburg while Putin worked in the administration of Saint Petersburg. In 2016, Marek Dalík received a five year prison sentence from the Prague Municipal Court, but the sentence was reduced to four years on appeal. He was convicted of receiving a payoff from Steyr while overseeing Pandur II shipments for the Czech Army.) He also noted that Topolánek had attended the birthday party of Zeman's aide Martin Nejedlý. Topolánek called Horáček's argument "pathetic", and mentioned Horáček's involvement in the gambling business. Ondráček was elected on 19 December.

Drahoš and Topolánek started attacking each other during December. Drahoš accused Topolánek's government of under-funding the Czech Academy of Sciences. Topolánek responded that the academy had 6 billions CZK during his government and cuts for its finances came after he left office. For his part, Topolánek attacked Drahoš over his statement that he would appoint a cabinet supported by the Communists and SPD, describing this as a U-turn, as Drahoš had previously stated the opposite.

On 15 December Pavel Fischer criticised Zeman for not participating in presidential debates. He sent him a public letter and wanted to meet with him for a head-to-head debate. He also said Zeman's presidential campaign was a "hybrid campaign", as though Zeman had stated that he wouldn't campaign, billboards promoting Zeman's campaign had appeared all over the country. Zeman's spokesman Ovčáček called Fischer "desperate". Fischer himself attracted controversy on 16 December when he stated that he would not appoint a homosexual as a judge to the Constitutional Court. He later apologised for his statement.

On 20 December Drahoš' team published a post on social media about Václav Klaus's amnesty, which was criticised when it was revealed that Drahoš' team had copied a similar post by Horáček. Drahoš apologised and attributed the mistake to an external creative. Horáček commented that it was not the first time Drahoš had copied his campaign.

=== January 2018 ===
In January, Czech Television started to broadcast spots of all candidates, except Zeman's who refused to make one. Marek Hilšer attacked Zeman for not participating in debates, suggesting that the debates should feature an empty chair to remind viewers of Zeman's absence.

Mirek Topolánek launched the final phase of his campaign on 3 January, saying that he wanted to be a strong president who "would neither welcome EU migrant quotas, nor beckon to Eastern powers". He also attacked Miloš Zeman and Jiří Drahoš.

The campaign became more aggressive in the days leading up to the first round. Drahoš attacked Topolánek over funding for the Czech Academy of Sciences, accusing Topolánek of trying to destroy and defund the academy. Topolánek dismissed Drahoš' accusation and stated that cut in funding for the academy took place after his premiership concluded, supporting his arguments with a graph. Topolánek then suggested that the academy's problems were due to Drahoš' poor management skills. Drahoš disagreed. Topolánek attacked Drahoš over his campaign manager Jakub Kleindienst, due to his connection to past scandals via his involvement in a company with links to former Minister David Rath. Drahoš defended Kleindiest in interviews. Michal Horáček was accused of financing negative articles about his political rivals, which he denied. Pavel Fischer described Horáček's tactics as "dirty".

Pavel Fischer held a meeting with his supporters on 7 January 2018. His supporters started referring to his presidential campaign as a "Turquoise revolution". Fischer's supporters were very active on social media.

=== First round ===
First round results by district

Before the first round, leaflets were distributed in the city of Ostrava containing false claims that Zeman, as the current president, would automatically progress to the second round of the election, so that his supporters would be absent during the first. Similar messages were also shared on social media. The Ostrava police investigated the matter as a criminal act.

During the first round, Miloš Zeman was confronted while preparing to cast his vote by a Ukrainian Femen protester who repeatedly screamed "Zeman, Putin's slut", with the same words painted across her bare chest. She was removed from the polling station by security and arrested on a count of disorderly conduct. The protester was later expelled from the country and sentenced by the court to three months of prison with the sentence being suspended for a one-year probation period. Some commentators speculated that the Femen protester's actions may have contributed to Zeman's re-election, and theories also circulated that the protest was organized by Zeman's campaign team, which the protester denied.

Miloš Zeman and Jiří Drahoš qualified for the second round, with 38.57% and 26.60% of the vote respectively. Drahoš won the most votes in Prague, Prague-West and Prague-East Districts, and from voters abroad. Zeman won the most votes in all other districts of the country.

=== Second round ===
Second round result by district

Drahoš was endorsed by defeated candidates Pavel Fischer, Marek Hilšer, Michal Horáček, Vratislav Kulhánek and Mirek Topolánek. Zeman was endorsed by Petr Hannig. Jiří Hynek said he would publish his endorsement one day before the second round, after the two remaining candidates had answered a questionnaire he would send them. Zeman agreed to participate in debates for the second round. Drahoš received endorsements from the Civic Democratic Party and TOP 09. Drahoš was considered the slight front-runner in the second round. Zeman "changed his tone" and emphasized his centrist credentials during the last stretch of the election campaign.

Drahoš launched his second round campaign on 16 January 2018. He visited his hometown Jablunkov and was welcomed by his supporters at the Town Hall. Drahoš received a Golden Apple from the mayor of the town and then attended an ice hockey match in Třinec. He was booed by ice hockey fans during the match. Pavel Fischer, Michal Horáček and Marek Hilšer decided to participate in Drahoš' campaign.

The Friends of Miloš Zeman Association published an anti-Drahoš advertisement linking him with support for immigration. Drahoš stated that he did not support immigration and opposed migrant quotas. Zeman himself said that he considered the advertisement useless and believed that it would hurt him and not Drahoš. On the other hand, he defended his supporters and repeated the connection of Drahoš with immigration.

Zeman appeared in a broadcast on TV Nova on 21 January 2018. He said he would prefer a government of ANO supported by the Social Democrats and the Communist Party. He also stated that he would be less arrogant during his second term. Drahoš on the other hand held meetings with his supporters in Brno and Ostrava.

==== Debates ====
On 15 January, Zeman suggested that he and Drahoš should participate in four debates. Drahoš said that he would participate in only two debates, to spend his time focusing on a personal campaign in regions where he had received fewer votes.

The candidates eventually faced each other in two head-to-head debates. The first was broadcast on Prima TV on 23 January. The debate was very aggressive and influenced by the loud audience. Zeman was described as more energetic, while Drahoš was said to be faint and visibly nervous. Experts expressed the opinion that Zeman had dominated the debate and appeared as the victor. Drahoš improved his performance during the Czech Television debate on 25 January. The debate was calmer and Drahoš was considered to be less uncertain than during the previous debate. The second debate was considered a tie by most commentators. Several experts rated Drahoš's performance on Czech TV as weaker than Zeman's. The media lecturer from the Metropolitan University suggested that Drahoš had lost the debate in the opening minutes, while the political scientist from the CEVRO Institute was the only expert who considered Drahoš to be the winner of the debate.

=== Result ===
Voting was held on 26 and 27 January 2018. Zeman emerged victorious with 51.37% of the vote to Drahoš's 48.63%, with a turnout of 66.60%, the highest since the 1998 legislative election.

== Campaign finance ==
No candidate may spend more than 40,000,000 CZK. Candidates who advance to the second round can spend 50,000,000 CZK (around US$2,300,000).

Candidate	Raised	Spent	Source
Jiří Drahoš	46,700,000 CZK	49,970,000 CZK	
Michal Horáček	0 CZK	39,900,000 CZK	
Miloš Zeman	4,500,000 CZK	22,700,000 CZK	
Mirek Topolánek	10,700,000 CZK	18,100,000 CZK	
Pavel Fischer	7,050,000 CZK	9,700,000 CZK	
Vratislav Kulhánek	7,400,000 CZK	7,000,000 CZK	
Marek Hilšer	455,000 CZK	1,800,000 CZK	
Jiří Hynek	440,000 CZK	732,000 CZK	
Petr Hannig	50,741 CZK	76,500 CZK	

== Debates ==
The first debate was held on 8 November 2017 at Charles University, and included Jiří Drahoš, Michal Horáček, Marek Hilšer, Jiří Hynek, Pavel Fischer, Petr Hannig and Mirek Topolánek. Miloš Zeman refused to participate and instead went to meet with citizens in the Olomouc region. Topolánek called for defense of the Schengen border. Drahoš stated that he wanted respect for the rules. The moderator mentioned Drahoš's attack against Topolánek, to which Topolánek stated that "it was either written by a woman or a PR Mage. I forgave the Professor, whether I ever took it seriously." The audience was allowed to vote for who they liked the most. Drahoš and Hilšer received the most votes. According to Hospodářské noviny, Topolánek and Hilšer came across as the most civil candidates.

Seznam News held a presidential debate on 13 November 2017. Topolánek, Drahoš, Horáček, Fischer, Hilšer and Kulhánek participated. Topolánek was considered the winner of the debate. Another debate was held in Liberec on 16 November 2017.

== Opinion polls ==
Opinion polls from 2014 showed Miloš Zeman leading in the first round with between 20% and 48% of the vote. Michal Horáček became his main rival during 2016 but was overtaken by Jiří Drahoš during 2017. Drahoš was leading polls for the second round with a 10% lead in September 2017. The margin narrowed during October and November and Drahoš' lead fluctuated between 0.5% and 4%. Some polls in late January 2018 showed Zeman with a narrow lead.

== Results ==
Candidate	Party	First round		Second round	
Candidate	Party	Votes	%	Votes	%
Miloš Zeman	Party of Civic Rights	1,985,547	38.57	2,853,390	51.37
Jiří Drahoš	Independent (Note: Supported by KDU–ČSL and STAN)	1,369,601	26.60	2,701,206	48.63
Pavel Fischer	Independent	526,694	10.23		
Michal Horáček	Independent	472,643	9.18		
Marek Hilšer	Independent	454,949	8.84		
Mirek Topolánek	Independent (Note: Supported by ODS)	221,689	4.31		
Jiří Hynek	Realists	63,348	1.23		
Petr Hannig	Party of Common Sense (Note: Supported by ND, RSČMS, ZpL, KSH, ČHNJ and DSZ)	29,228	0.57		
Vratislav Kulhánek	Civic Democratic Alliance	24,442	0.47		
Total		5,148,141	100.00	5,554,596	100.00
Valid votes		5,148,141	99.44	5,554,596	99.77
Invalid/blank votes		29,097	0.56	13,031	0.23
Total votes		5,177,238	100.00	5,567,627	100.00
Registered voters/turnout		8,366,433	61.88	8,362,987	66.57
Source: Volby

== Aftermath ==
Zeman said that a narrow victory pleases the most people, and that he respected all people who vote. Zeman confirmed that his second term would be the end of his political career, as the election was "his last political victory that won't be followed by any political defeat." Drahoš conceded defeat and congratulated Zeman. He stated that he would not be leaving politics, telling supporters: "We didn't win but we didn't lose. I want to use the huge amount of energy that shouldn't disappear".

Prime Minister Andrej Babiš congratulated Zeman and said that he had believed that the campaign based on attacks against him could not succeed. Leader of the opposition Petr Fiala also congratulated Zeman, and expressed hope that Zeman would serve the interests of the Czech Republic. The leader of Pirate Party, Ivan Bartoš, stated that he was pleased about the strong support for Jiří Drahoš. SPD leader Tomio Okamura and acting Social Democrat leader Milan Chovanec celebrated the results with Zeman at his election headquarters. Okamura expressed joy at the result, and Chovanec stated that he was glad that Zeman won. Communist Party leader Vojtěch Filip described Zeman's victory as an assurance of stability. KDU–ČSL leader Pavel Bělobrádek expressed hope that Zeman would unify the divided society. Miroslav Kalousek expressed dissatisfaction with the result and stated that the Czech Republic had wasted an opportunity for change. Zeman was also personally congratulated by his predecessor Václav Klaus. Klaus stated that he was glad about the result but afraid that Drahoš' supporters would not accept it. Zeman thanked Klaus for his support and invited him for a drink.

By the end of February 2018, the Supreme Administrative Court rejected all of about 70 complaints concerning the regularity of elections, ruling that there were no serious mistakes or violations of the election law that could have influenced the outcome of the election. Some of the rejected complaints were then submitted to the Constitutional court, which rejected the last complaint in June 2018, thus confirming the result.

According to a poll conducted by Median, 54.2% of Czech people were satisfied with the result, and 37.5% were dissatisfied.

=== International reactions ===
- China - President Xi Jinping congratulated Zeman and stated that he wants to take the strategic partnership between the two countries to a higher level.
- European Union - European Commission President Jean-Claude Juncker congratulated Zeman and said he was looking forward to working with him. European Council President Donald Tusk also congratulated Zeman on his victory.
- France - President Emmanuel Macron congratulated Zeman on 13 February 2018, and highlighted the friendly relations and historical ties between the two countries.
- Germany - President Frank-Walter Steinmeier congratulated Zeman and noted the two countries' common history. Chancellor Angela Merkel congratulated Zeman on 1 February 2018.
- Israel - Prime Minister Benjamin Netanyahu personally congratulated Zeman.
- Russia - President Vladimir Putin was among the first to congratulate Zeman, saying that the election confirmed Zeman's authority. He expressed readiness for constructive cooperation on bilateral relations.
- Slovakia - Prime Minister Robert Fico was the first international politician to congratulate Zeman, calling him an intelligent and experienced politician and saying that he was pleased with the result. President Andrej Kiska congratulated Zeman and expressed hope that relations between the two countries would stay close. He also invited Zeman to Slovakia.

=== Analysis ===
Observers compared the presidential race to previous elections such as the 2016 Austrian, 2016 United States and 2017 French presidential elections, which saw a liberal internationalist running against a national populist. Though both sides seemed to have roughly equal support among Czech voters, the national populism was represented by clearer ideology and strong leaders, while the liberal message was fragmented and the candidates did not have common themes or language, apart from agreeing on the need for an "anti-Zeman" candidate.

According to analysts, important factors in Zeman's victory were his strong debate performances and the closeness of the first round results, the latter helping mobilize his base. Drahoš was estimated to have lost about a quarter of his voters as a result of the televised debates. Analysts also pointed out that the support for Zeman came from districts with high levels of poverty, and also from regions dominated by traditional industries, agriculture and the construction industry, while regions dominated by IT services and public administration supported Drahoš. Zeman's strident opposition to immigration also worked in his favor, though his major opponents Drahoš and Horáček also voiced opposition to immigration and the EU's migrant quotas, while all but one candidate criticised illegal immigration to Europe.

Analysts as well as politicians saw the close election results as an illustration of the deep divisions present in Czech society.
