= Karel Štogl =

Czech lawyer (1973–2021)

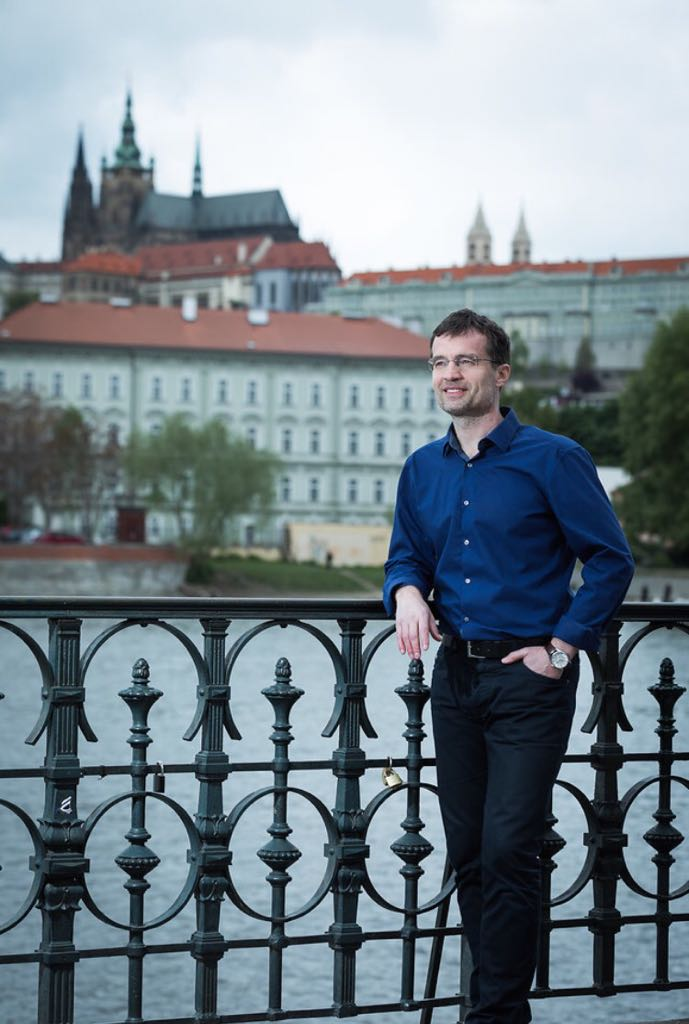

Personal details
- Born: 1 June 1973 Brno, Czechoslovakia
- Died: 11 June 2021 (aged 48)
- Citizenship: Czech
- Party: ČSSD (1997–2013)
- Education: Masaryk University

Karel Štogl (1 June 1973 – 11 June 2021) was a Czech lawyer, bureaucrat and diplomat. He announced on 13 March 2017 that he would run for the presidency in the 2018 Czech presidential election.

== Biography ==
Štogl was born in 1973. He lived in Mikulov during his childhood. He studied law at Masaryk University and worked as lawyer after his graduation. He joined Czech Social Democratic Party in 1997. He was elected to local assembly. He worked with multiple influential people of the party including Jaroslav Tvrdík, Bohuslav Sobotka or Michal Hašek. He also worked in private sector.

He unsuccessfully ran for European Parliament in 2009. In 2010, he moved to Prague and unsuccessfully ran for municipal assembly in Prague 13. During 2013 Czech presidential election he offered his help with campaign to Jiří Dienstbier Jr. Dienstbier refused Štogl, who then helped Miloš Zeman with his campaign. Štogl became Chief of Jiří Rusnok's Cabinet in 2013.

On 13 March 2017, he announced his candidacy for the President of the Czech Republic in 2018 presidential election. He stated that he would seek nomination by ten senators. On 7 June 2017, Štogl announced that he obtained ten signatures required to run.
