= Jiří Ovčáček =

Czech politician

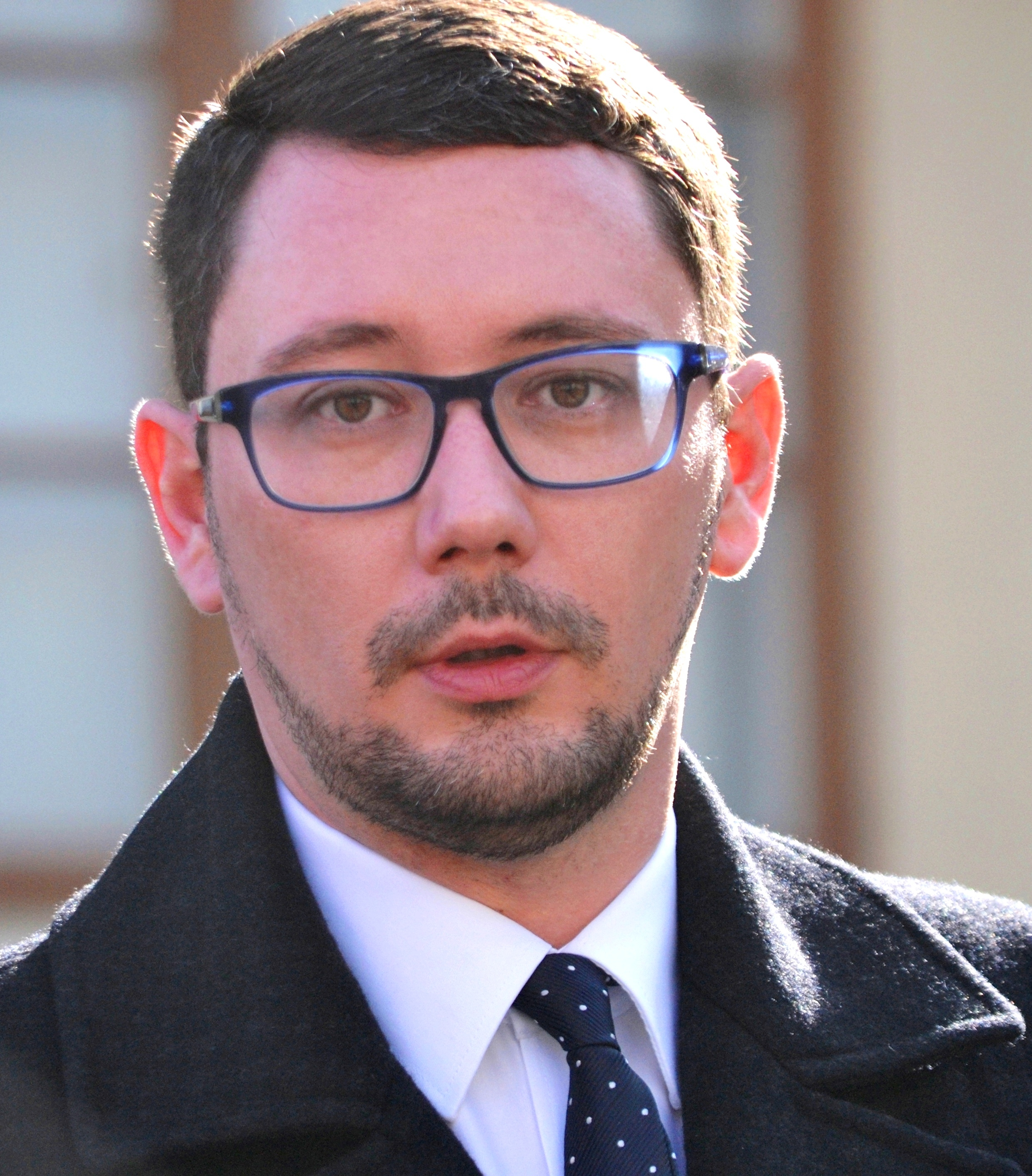
- Jiří Ovčáček in 2015

Personal details
- Born: 13 January 1979 (age 47) Prague, Czechoslovakia
- Education: Faculty of Arts, Charles University

Jiří Ovčáček (born 13 January 1979) is a Czech journalist and news columnist. He previously worked as the spokesperson for Miloš Zeman during Zeman's presidency.

== Biography ==
=== Early life ===
Ovčáček was born on 13 January 1979. He studied at the Archbishop's High School in Prague, but dropped out at the age of 16 after dying his hair green in a protest against the school environment. Ovčáček graduated from the Ecological Gymnasium.

=== Early career ===
In February 2015, the Echo24 server's GhostBuster column reported that Ovčáček had written 443 articles in two years between 2002 and 2004, while working for Haló noviny, which reflected his fascination with communism.

=== Government Office of the Czech Republic ===
Ovčáček worked in the press department of the Government Office of the Czech Republic during Jiří Paroubek's tenure as prime minister. Ovčáček served as the deputy director of the department and became Paroubek's press spokesman, but was dismissed in 2007 after Paroubek lost trust in him. In his book Plnou parou v politice (lit. 'Full steam in politics'), Paroubek accused Ovčáček of slandering him in the tabloid media.

Other commentators criticised Ovčáček's journalism over his alleged bias, extending to expressions of personal revenge. During the 2013 Czech presidential election, Deník Referendum editor Patrik Eichler accused Ovčáček of bias against Jiří Dienstbier Jr. as a ČSSD candidate.

=== Spokesman for Miloš Zeman ===
Ovčáček was appointed press spokesman for Miloš Zeman in December 2013. His predecessor Hana Burianová initially remained as director of the press department of the presidential office, until Ovčáček replaced her in this position in May 2014.

Ovčáček was the subject of criticism for his methods in the role. frequently attacking Zeman's opponents and critics in coarse terms and comparing them to fascists. In September 2021, Patrik Schober, executive board member of the Public Relations and Communications Association (PRCA), said that Ovčáček "lies, divides society and deliberately labels", and criticised his high salary, while Czech media commentator Ondřej Kubal said that Ovčáček's behaviour did not correspond to the function of the president's spokesperson.

In 2015, Ovčáček was involved in the "Hitler is a Gentleman" case, in which he and Zeman made negative statements about Czechoslovak journalist Ferdinand Peroutka.

=== Later career ===
When Petr Pavel took office as president of the Czech Republic in early 2023, Ovčáček resigned as presidential spokesperson and was replaced by Markéta Řeháková. In April 2023, he started working as an editor and commentator for the social website Život v Česku.

== Social media use ==
While spokesman for President Zeman, Ovčáček was criticised for idiosyncratic use of social media, publishing vulgar and obscene comments which sometimes did not distinguish clearly between his own views and Zeman's. Ovčáček used his Twitter account and President Zeman's Facebook account to broadcast live recordings of Zeman's speeches, which he referred to as "OVTV".

In June 2019, internet trolls began using the comments sections underneath Ovčáček's tweets as noticeboards for unrelated discussions, such as sharing recipes or tips for pest control, which Ovčáček claimed was the work of activists from A Million Moments for Democracy. Social media expert Daniel Dočekal argued that this form of trolling was helping Ovčáček gain followers and become more visible on Twitter.

== In popular culture ==
A satirical political cabaret, Ovčáček čtveřáček, was created in 2016 at the Zlín Theatre, in response to some controversial events connected with the presidency of Miloš Zeman. The main role of Ovčáček was played by Marek Příkazký. In 2017, the theatre premiered a sequel, Ovčáček miláček.

In 2017, the card board game Čtveráček was launched, inspired by the conduct of Zeman and Ovčáček. According to the description, it is a satirical improvisational card party game in which players play presidents, press officers and journalists.

Ovčáček presented his own talk show, Jiří Ovčáček, on TV Barrandov from the end of August 2019 until December 2019, when TV Barrandov suspended the broadcast citing viewership figures.

== Personal life ==
In 2018, Ovčáček converted from the Czechoslovak Hussite Church to Roman Catholicism. He has been married to a Ukrainian woman since November 2022. The couple met when he took her in as a refugee from the Russian invasion of Ukraine.

On 16 December 2021, Ovčáček was taken to the detention station after he took a taxi costing CZK 350 to Dělnická Street in Holešovice, refused to pay, and fell asleep drunk. Ovčáček later apologised for his behavior, citing "various dramatic circumstances surrounding the formation of the government" as the reason.
