= Prezident 21 =

Prezident 21 is an interactive website, created by the Czech mathematician and political activist Karel Janeček and his think tank, Institute H21, used to familiarise voters with a proposed system to select a presidential candidate for the 2018 Czech presidential election.

== Operation ==
The software went live on 21 December 2016. Participants were allowed to nominate anyone except for the software creator, Janeček. Everyone who voted was allowed three positive votes and one negative vote.

== Outcome ==
Over 3,000 people participated in the first few hours of the website's creation, after which Šimon Pánek was in first place. The incumbent president Miloš Zeman was last. Zeman's poor result was said to be most likely due to the fact that his supporters were less active on the Internet. By April 2017, Michal Horáček had taken the lead, and was then overtaken by Jiří Drahoš. The software developers announced a plan to conduct opinion polls through the software.
