= Vratislav Kulhánek =

Czech business manager

Personal details
- Born: 20 November 1943 (age 82) České Budějovice, Protectorate of Bohemia and Moravia
- Party: KSČ (1968–1970); Civic Democratic Alliance (2016)
- Education: University of Economics, Prague; European Business School
- Occupation: Manager
- Website: kulhaneknahrad.cz

Vratislav Kulhánek (born 20 November 1943) is a Czech business manager and former chairman of the Czech Ice Hockey Association. He stood as a candidate in the 2018 presidential election as a nominee of the Civic Democratic Alliance, finishing ninth of nine candidates.

== Business career ==
He studied at the University of Economics, Prague and the European Business School. He later worked in variety of companies. In 1992, he became the chairman of Robert Bosch in České Budějovice. He worked at Škoda Auto from 1997. He left Škoda in 2007 and became Chairman of the Czech Ice Hockey Association in 2004. He remained in the position until 2008. He later started working for Kooperativa Förbundet.

== Presidential election 2018 ==
He announced his candidacy for Czech president on 29 June 2017, as the candidate of the Civic Democratic Alliance (ODA), which collected the signatures needed to run and also supported him financially. Incumbent president Miloš Zeman commented that he did not know Kulhánek very well but remembered him as a successful manager of Škoda Auto. ODA leader Sehnal stated that Kulhánek would be a right-wing candidate. Kulhánek finished last of the nine candidates, with 0.47% of the vote. Kulhánek endorsed Jiří Drahoš for the second round.

== Political views ==
A conservative, Kulhánek stated that he has always been close to ODA and Freedom Union, and he also has sympathy for some politicians of the Civic Democratic Party. Kulhánek opposes Muslim immigration, and has stated that he does not want Mosques in the Czech Republic. On 17 July 2017, he stated that the Czech Republic was able to accept 5,000–10,000 refugees, adding that he would only accept those that were verifiably in danger, and would not accumulate them in one place, so that they would be obliged to adapt if they wanted to live in the country.

Kulhánek is pro-European and supports adoption of the Euro in the Czech Republic, but he opposes the politics of Angela Merkel and Emmanuel Macron. He is also supportive of NATO.
