= Jiří Hynek =

Czech business manager and politician (born 1960)

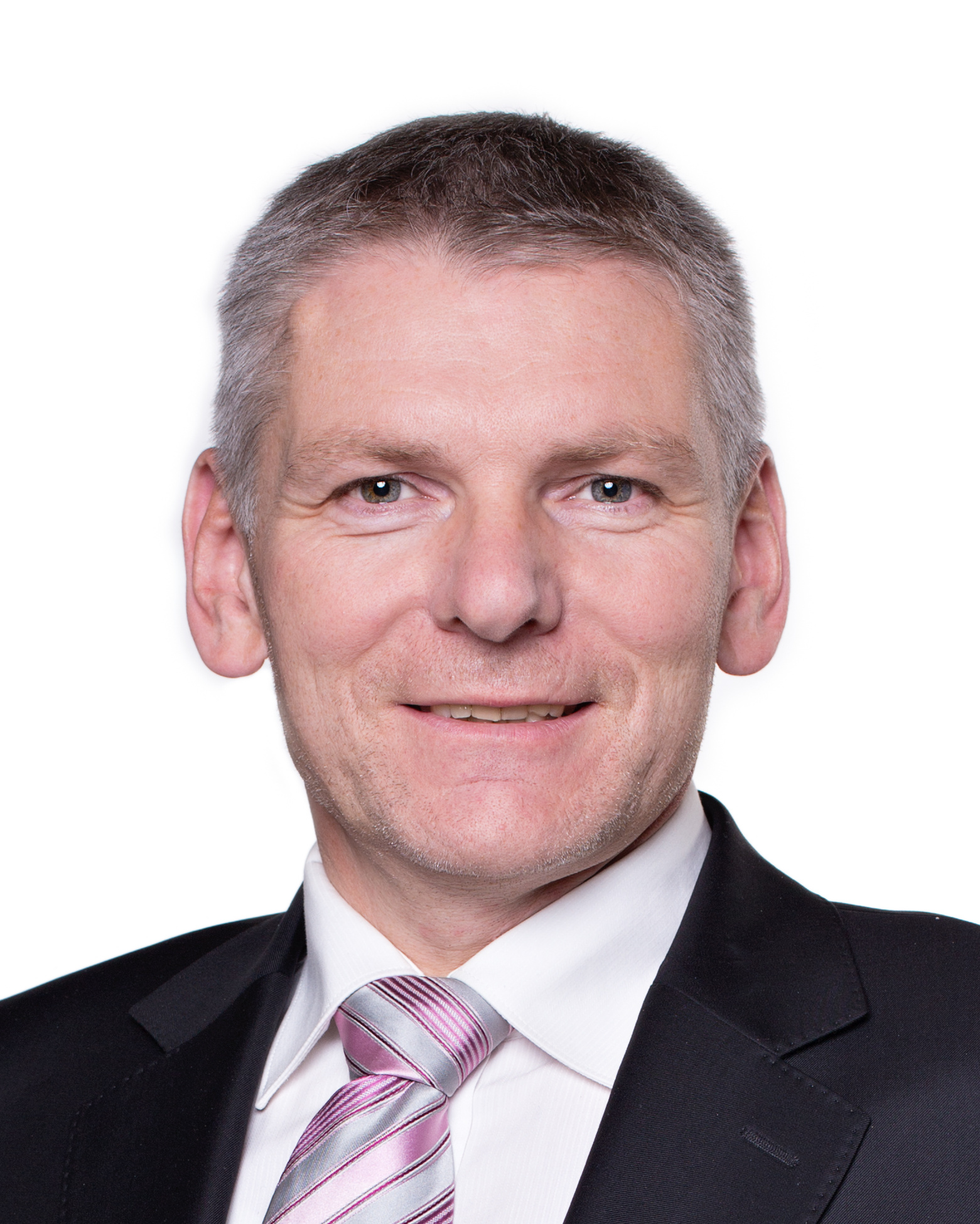

Personal details
- Born: 20 December 1960 (age 65) Ústí nad Labem, Czechoslovakia
- Citizenship: Czech
- Party: REAL
- Education: Charles University
- Occupation: Manager

Jiří Hynek (born 20 December 1960) is a Czech business manager and politician, who is currently the chair of the Defence and Security Industry Association of the Czech Republic. He was a member of the Realists party, standing as the party's candidate in the 2018 presidential election and finishing sixth of nine candidates. He later stood in the 2021 legislative election as a candidate for Přísaha.

== Early career ==
Hynek studied at the Faculty of Mathematics and Physics at Charles University in Prague in the 1980s. After his studies he worked for a number of Czech companies before becoming a business manager.

In 2011, Hynek became the new Chairman of the Association for Weapons and Defense Industry of the Czech Republic. In 2016 Hynek co-founded a new political party, the Realists.

He is a member of the Czech chapter of Mensa.

== 2018 Presidential election ==
Hynek announced his candidacy for the 2018 presidential election on 21 August 2017, and started gathering the signatures required to be registered as a candidate. He stated that he planned to focus on security during the campaign.

On 17 October 2017, Hynek announced that he had gathered the 20 MP signatures needed for nomination. He finished sixth with 1.23% of the vote. Hynek endorsed Miloš Zeman for the second round.

== Later political career ==
Hynek stood as a candidate in the 2018 Senate election in Chrudim district. He received 1.8% of votes and failed to win the seat. The Realists party was dissolved in 2019.

Hynek stood in the 2021 legislative election for the Přísaha party. The party did not win any seats.
