= Petr Hannig =

Czech musician and politician (1946–2025)

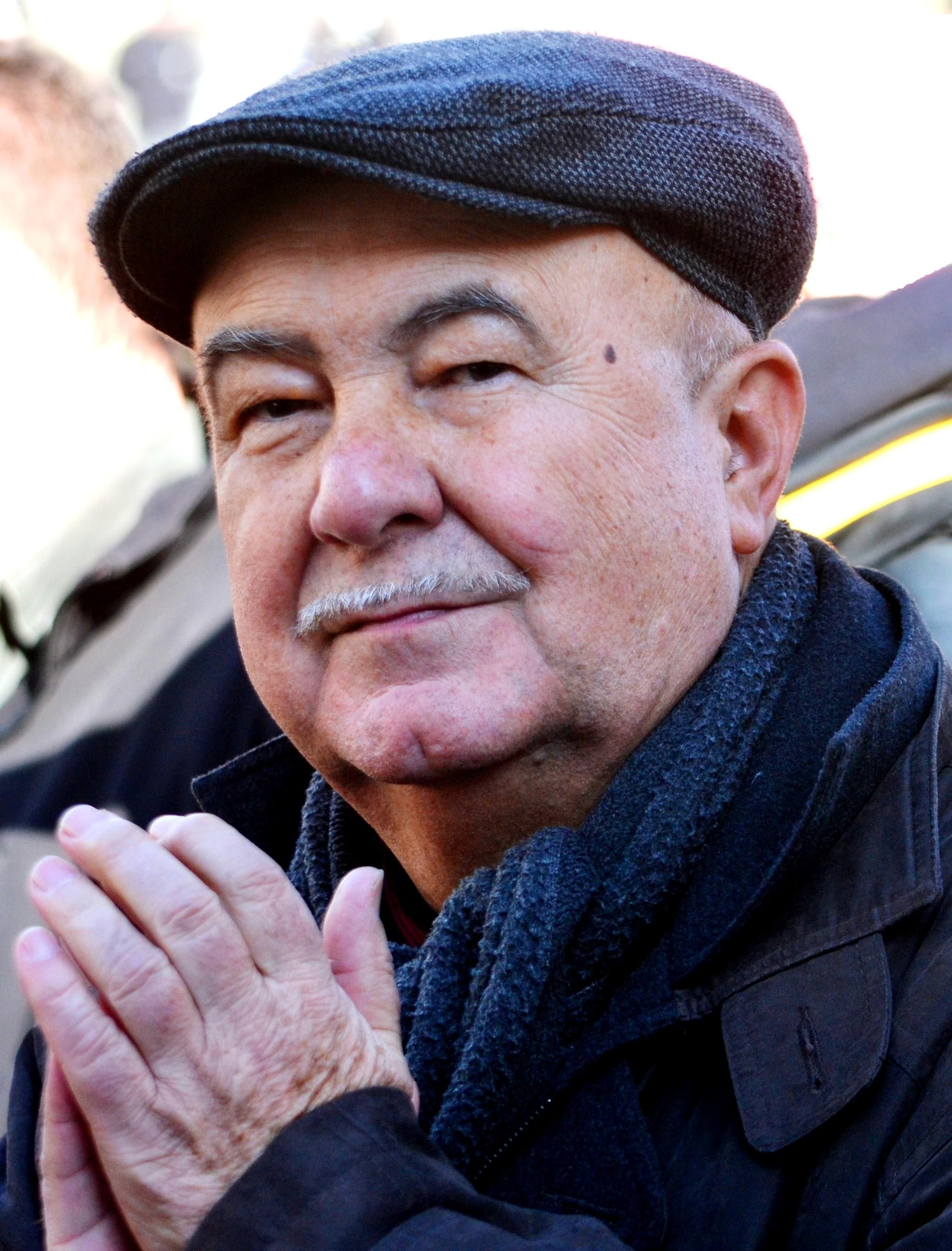

Personal details
- Born: 20 January 1946 Ústí nad Labem, Czechoslovakia
- Died: 21 January 2025 (aged 79) Prague, Czech Republic
- Citizenship: Czech Republic
- Party: Party of Common Sense
- Education: Academy of Performing Arts in Prague
- Website: www.petrhannig-rozumni.cz

Petr Hannig (20 January 1946 – 21 January 2025) was a Czech singer, producer, politician and leader of the Party of Common Sense.

In July 2017, he announced his candidacy for the president of the Czech Republic in the 2018 election. Having finished seventh in the first round with 0.56% of the vote, Hannig then endorsed Miloš Zeman for the second round.

Hannig was a Roman Catholic. He died in Prague on 21 January 2025, one day after his 79th birthday.

== Election history ==
Election	Candidate	First round result			Second round result		
Election	Candidate	Votes	%Votes	Result	Votes	%Votes	Result
2018	Petr Hannig	29,228	0.56	8th place			
