= Marek Hilšer =

Czech political activist and university lecturer (born 1976)

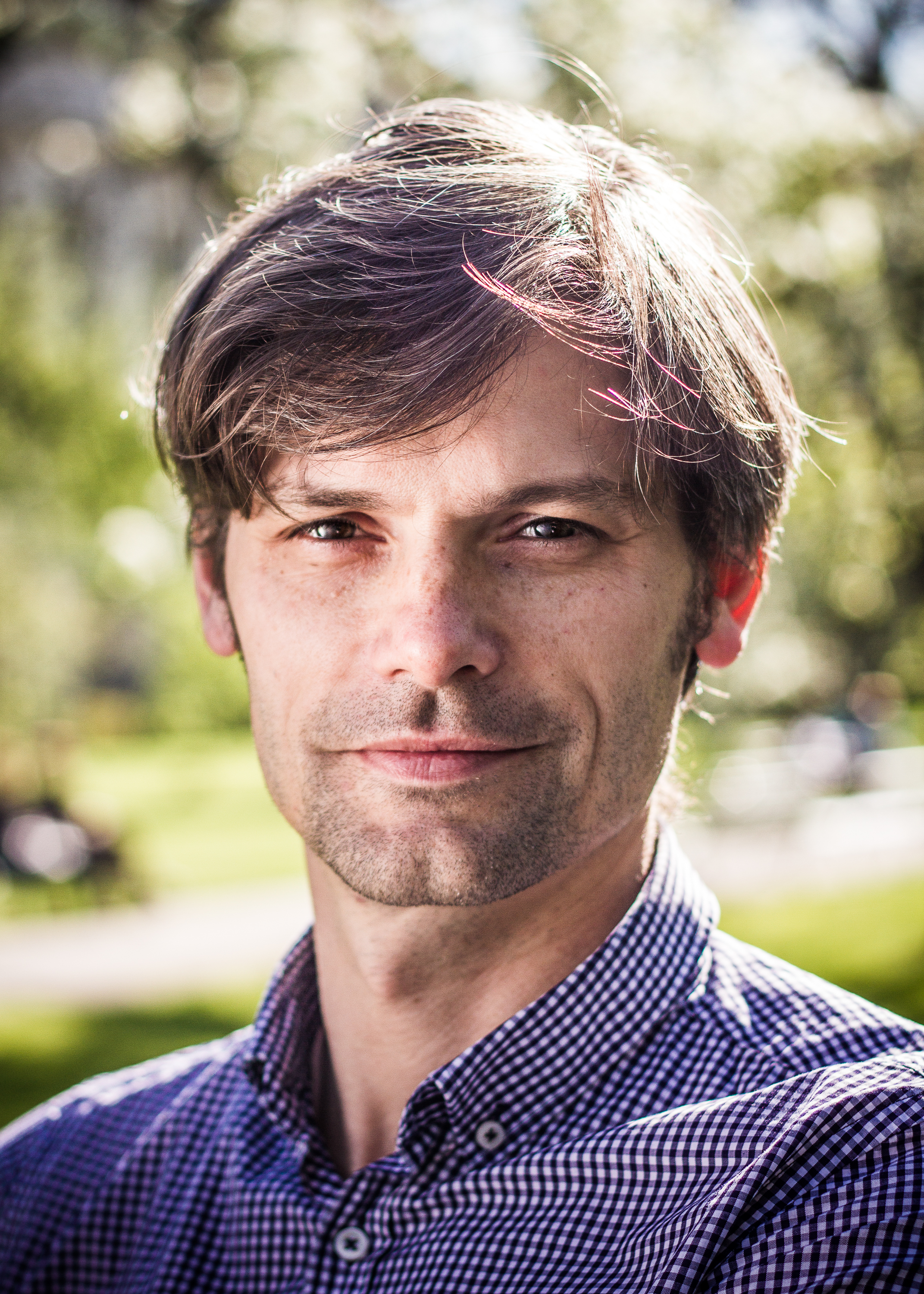

Senator for Prague 2
- In office 13 October 2018 – 13 October 2024
- Preceded by: Libor Michálek
- Succeeded by: Miroslav Bárta

Personal details
- Born: 23 March 1976 (age 50) Chomutov, Czechoslovakia
- Citizenship: Czech
- Party: We are a team
- Education: Charles University
- Occupation: Physician
- Website: www.mareknahrad.cz

Marek Hilšer (born 23 March 1976) is a Czech politician and university lecturer who served as the senator for Prague 2 from 2018 to 2024. He also stood in the 2018 and 2023 Czech presidential elections.

== Early life ==
Hilšer was born in Chomutov in 1976. His family emigrated from Czechoslovakia in 1989 but returned in 1990. He studied Public Relations at Charles University and went to the United States in 1999, where he had jobs including working as a plumber and digger. He returned to the Czech Republic in 2004 and studied medicine at Charles University. In 2007, he became a scientist at the First Faculty of Medicine at Charles University.

== Political career ==
=== Early political career ===
In 2008, Hilšer led protests against plans by Minister of Health Tomáš Julínek to turn teaching hospitals into joint-stock companies. Prime Minister Mirek Topolánek later announced the plans would not be implemented.

Hilšer also led protests against university reforms by Minister of Education Josef Dobeš in 2012, known as "a week of unrest".

=== Failed elections ===
Hilšer announced his candidacy for the Czech presidency on 27 July 2016. He finished fifth of the nine candidates, with 8.83% of the vote. Hilšer endorsed Jiří Drahoš for the second round.

In the 2018 Czech Senate election, Hilšer successfully contested the Prague 2 district, defeating incumbent Libor Michálek in the second round with 79.75% of the vote.

Hilšer was a candidate in the 2023 Czech presidential election. He finished sixth of eight candidates in the first round on 14 January 2023, with 2.56% of the vote, and subsequently endorsed Petr Pavel for the second round.
