= Opinion polling for the 2023 Czech presidential election =

This page lists nationwide public opinion polls that have been conducted relating to the 2023 Czech presidential election. Poll results are listed in the tables below in reverse chronological order, showing the most recent first. The highest percentage figure in each polling survey is displayed in bold, and the background shaded in the leading candidate's colour. In the instance that there is a tie, then no figure is shaded. Poll results use the date the survey's fieldwork was done, as opposed to the date of publication; however, if such date is unknown, the date of publication will be given instead.

== Opinion polls for the first round ==
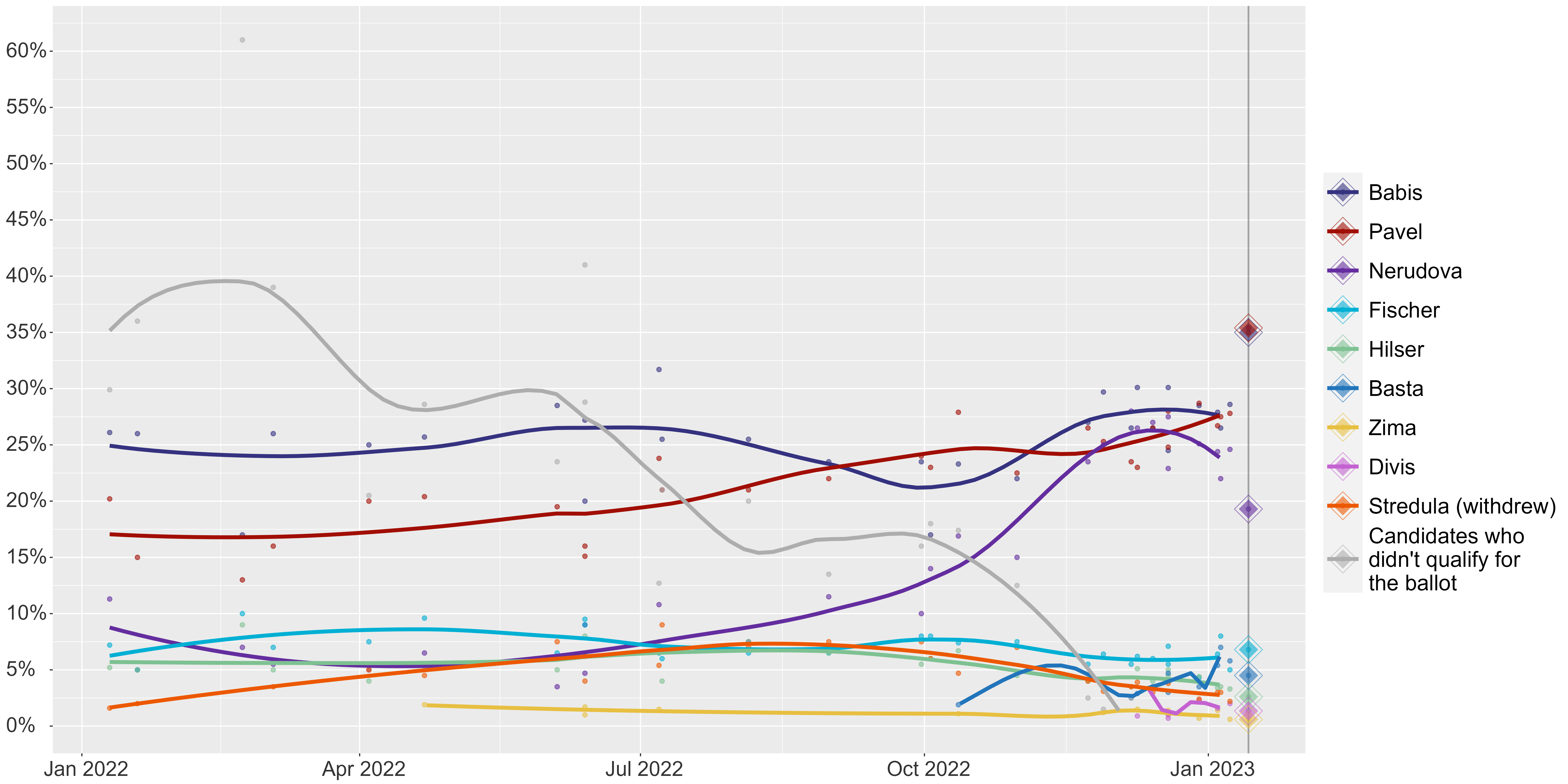
A LOESS graph displaying the polls for the first round of the 2023 Czech Presidential election

=== Since nominations were closed ===
Date	Agency	Andrej Babiš	Petr Pavel	Danuše Nerudová	Pavel Fischer	Marek Hilšer	Josef Středula	Karel Janeček	Jaroslav Bašta	Denisa Rohanová	Tomáš Zima	Karel Diviš	Others
13–14 Jan 2023	1st round result	**35.0**	**35.4**	13.9	6.8	2.6	—N/a	—N/a	4.4	—N/a	0.6	1.4	—N/a
8 Jan 2023	**Středula withdraws, endorses Nerudová**												
5–9 Jan 2023	Median	**26.5**	**29.5**	21.0	6.0	4.0	2.5	—N/a	7.0	—N/a	0.5	2.5	—N/a
5–8 Jan 2023	Ipsos	**28.6**	**27.8**	24.6	5.0	3.3	2.2	—N/a	5.8	—N/a	0.6	2.0	—N/a
2–5 Jan 2023	Data Collect and Kantar CZ	**26.5**	**27.5**	22.0	8.0	3.5	3.0	—N/a	7.0	—N/a	—N/a	—N/a	2.5
2–4 Jan 2023	STEM	**27.9**	**26.7**	24.4	6.4	3.4	3.0	—N/a	5.4	—N/a	1.4	1.6	—N/a
27–29 Dec 2022	Median	**28.5**	**28.7**	25.1	4.3	4.4	2.4	—N/a	3.5	—N/a	0.7	2.3	—N/a
13–19 Dec 2022	Sanep	**30.1**	**24.8**	22.9	7.1	4.5	3.8	—N/a	4.7	—N/a	1.4	0.7	—N/a
8-19 Dec 2022	Median	24.5	**28.0**	**27.5**	5.5	5.0	4.0	—N/a	3.0	—N/a	1.0	1.0	—N/a
5–14 Dec 2022	Data Collect and Kantar CZ	**26.5**	**26.5**	**27.0**	6.0	4.0	3.0	—N/a	3.5	—N/a	—N/a	—N/a	3.5
13 Dec 2022	**Court disqualifies Rohanová and Janeček, Diviš registered by court**												
29 Nov–9 Dec 2022	STEM	**30.1**	23.0	**26.5**	6.2	5.1	3.9	—N/a	2.9	—N/a	1.5	0.9	—N/a
9 Nov–7 Dec 2022	Median	**26.5**	23.5	**28.0**	5.5	3.5	3.5	2.0	2.5	0.5	—N/a	—N/a	4.5
25–28 Nov 2022	Ipsos	**29.7**	**25.3**	25.0	6.4	4.2	3.1	—N/a	3.6	1.5	1.2	—N/a	—N/a
14–23 Nov 2022	Data Collect and Kantar CZ	**27.0**	**26.5**	23.5	5.5	4.0	4.0	2.5	—N/a	—N/a	—N/a	—N/a	7.0

=== January—October 2022 ===
Date	Agency	Andrej Babiš	Petr Pavel	Danuše Nerudová	Pavel Fischer	Miroslav Kalousek	Marek Hilšer	Jiří Drahoš	Miroslava Němcová	Miloš Vystrčil	Václav Klaus	Josef Středula	Karel Janeček	Vladimír Dlouhý	Klára Long Slámová	Jaromír Soukup	Tomio Okamura	Lenka Bradáčová	Vít Rakušan	Alena Vitásková	Jiří Rusnok	Michael Kocáb	Marek Eben	Dana Drábová	Tomáš Zima	Tomáš Pojar	Ivo Mareš	Alexandr Vondra	Jaroslav Bašta	Tomáš Březina	Alena Schillerová	Karel Havlíček
1–31 Oct 2022	Median	22.0	**22.5**	15.0	7.5	—N/a	4.5	—N/a	4.0	—N/a	2.0	7.0	1.5	—N/a	—N/a	—N/a	—N/a	—N/a	—N/a	3.5	—N/a	—N/a	—N/a	—N/a	—N/a	—N/a	—N/a	—N/a	—N/a	—N/a	—N/a	—N/a
7–12 Oct 2022	Ipsos	23.3	**27.9**	16.9	7.4	—N/a	6.7	—N/a	—N/a	—N/a	—N/a	4.7	6.2	—N/a	—N/a	—N/a	—N/a	—N/a	—N/a	3.0	—N/a	—N/a	—N/a	—N/a	1.1	—N/a	—N/a	—N/a	1.9	0.9	—N/a	—N/a
27 Sep–3 Oct 2022	STEM/Mark	17.0	**23.0**	14.0	8.0	—N/a	6.0	—N/a	—N/a	—N/a	—N/a	6.0	—N/a	—N/a	—N/a	—N/a	—N/a	—N/a	—N/a	3.0	—N/a	—N/a	—N/a	—N/a	—N/a	—N/a	—N/a	—N/a	—N/a	—N/a	8.0	7.0
1–30 Sep 2022	Median	23.5	**24.0**	10.0	8.0	—N/a	5.5	—N/a	5.5	—N/a	3.5	7.5	3.5	—N/a	—N/a	—N/a	—N/a	—N/a	—N/a	—N/a	—N/a	—N/a	—N/a	—N/a	—N/a	—N/a	—N/a	—N/a	—N/a	—N/a	—N/a	—N/a
1–31 Aug 2022	Median	23.5	**22.0**	11.5	6.5	—N/a	6.5	—N/a	3.5	—N/a	3.0	7.5	2.5	—N/a	—N/a	—N/a	—N/a	2.0	—N/a	—N/a	—N/a	—N/a	—N/a	—N/a	—N/a	—N/a	—N/a	—N/a	—N/a	—N/a	—N/a	—N/a
24 Jun–5 Aug 2022	Median	25.5	**21.0**	7.5	6.5	—N/a	7.5	—N/a	5.5	—N/a	3.0	7.0	3.5	—N/a	—N/a	—N/a	—N/a	1.5	—N/a	3.0	—N/a	—N/a	—N/a	—N/a	—N/a	—N/a	—N/a	—N/a	—N/a	—N/a	—N/a	—N/a
18 Jun–8 Jul 2022	Median	25.5	**21.0**	7.0	6.0	—N/a	4.0	—N/a	4.5	—N/a	3.0	9.0	3.0	—N/a	—N/a	—N/a	—N/a	3.0	—N/a	2.5	—N/a	2.0	—N/a	—N/a	—N/a	—N/a	—N/a	—N/a	—N/a	—N/a	—N/a	—N/a
30 June - 7 July 2022	Ipsos	31.7	**23.8**	10.8	6.5	—N/a	7.5	—N/a	—N/a	4.8	—N/a	5.4	3.2	—N/a	—N/a	—N/a	—N/a	—N/a	—N/a	—N/a	—N/a	—N/a	—N/a	—N/a	1.5	—N/a	—N/a	—N/a	—N/a	—N/a	—N/a	—N/a
6 - 13 June 2022	STEM/MARK	20	**16**	9	9	—N/a	8	—N/a	9	9	—N/a	4	1	—N/a	1	1	6	—N/a	—N/a	3	—N/a	4	—N/a	—N/a	1	2	0	3	—N/a	—N/a	—N/a	—N/a
2 - 13 June 2022	Sanep	27.2	**15.1**	4.7	9.5	—N/a	6.3	—N/a	5.2	—N/a	3.5	6.2	4.3	—N/a	1.2	—N/a	—N/a	—N/a	—N/a	2.5	—N/a	—N/a	—N/a	—N/a	1.7	5.7	0.4	—N/a	—N/a	—N/a	—N/a	—N/a
1 May-4 June 2022	Median	28.5	**19.5**	3.5	6.5	—N/a	5.0	—N/a	6.0	—N/a	3.0	7.5	4.0	2.0	—N/a	—N/a	—N/a	2.5	—N/a	2.0	—N/a	—N/a	—N/a	—N/a	—N/a	—N/a	—N/a	—N/a	—N/a	—N/a	—N/a	—N/a
4-22 April 2022	Sanep	25.7	**20.4**	6.5	9.6	—N/a	5.3	—N/a	3.9	2.1	6.1	4.5	5.8	1.6	0.3	1.1	—N/a	—N/a	—N/a	—N/a	—N/a	—N/a	—N/a	—N/a	1.9	—N/a	—N/a	—N/a	—N/a	—N/a	—N/a	—N/a
1 March–4 April 2022	Median	25	**20**	5.0	7.5	—N/a	4.0	—N/a	3.5	—N/a	3.0	5.0	5.0	2.5	—N/a	0.5	—N/a	—N/a	—N/a	—N/a	—N/a	1.0	—N/a	—N/a	—N/a	—N/a	—N/a	—N/a	—N/a	—N/a	—N/a	—N/a
2–4 March 2022	Median	26	**16**	5.5	7	—N/a	5	—N/a	8	—N/a	4.5	3.5	5	3	—N/a	1	—N/a	—N/a	3.5	3.5	3.5	2	—N/a	—N/a	—N/a	—N/a	—N/a	—N/a	—N/a	—N/a	—N/a	—N/a
17-22 February 2022	STEM/Mark	17	13	7	10	—N/a	9	9	11	10	—N/a	—N/a	—N/a	—N/a	—N/a	—N/a	8	7	—N/a	4	—N/a	—N/a	**14**	9	—N/a	—N/a	—N/a	—N/a	—N/a	—N/a	—N/a	—N/a
17–19 January 2022	Kantar	26	**15**	5	5	3	5	8	4	3	—N/a	2	2	3	—N/a	—N/a	9	2	—N/a	—N/a	—N/a	—N/a	—N/a	—N/a	—N/a	—N/a	—N/a	—N/a	—N/a	—N/a	—N/a	—N/a
2–10 January 2022	Sanep	26.1	**20.2**	11.3	7.2	7.1	5.2	4.8	4.5	4.3	4.2	1.6	1.5	0.9	0.7	0.4	—N/a	—N/a	—N/a	—N/a	—N/a	—N/a	—N/a	—N/a	—N/a	—N/a	—N/a	—N/a	—N/a	—N/a	—N/a	—N/a

=== 2018–2021 ===
Date	Agency	Andrej Babiš	Marek Eben	Jiří Drahoš	Petr Pavel	Marek Hilšer	Václav Klaus Jr.	Pavel Rychetský	Miroslava Němcová	Pavel Fischer	Dana Drábová	Lenka Bradáčová	Miloš Vystrčil	Tomio Okamura	Danuše Nerudová	Vít Rakušan	Václav Klaus	Miroslav Kalousek	Josef Středula	Karel Janeček	Vladimír Dlouhý
December 2021	Ipsos	**23.2**	—N/a	—N/a	**12.5**	6.6	—N/a	—N/a	6.8	6.0	—N/a	4.9	4.2	7.1	2.3	8.3	—N/a	3.0	2.5	5.2	2.5
30 November 2021	Median	**26.5**	—N/a	7.5	**15.5**	4.5	—N/a	—N/a	7.0	6.5	—N/a	—N/a	—N/a	—N/a	3.0	8.5	5.0	3.5	—N/a	—N/a	—N/a
25–30 September 2021	Median	**8.0**	—N/a	7.0	**13.0**	6.0	—N/a	—N/a	6.0	7.0	—N/a	—N/a	—N/a	—N/a	2.0	—N/a	—N/a	—N/a	—N/a	—N/a	—N/a
23 April 2021	STEM/Mark	6.0	**16.0**	9.0	10.0	9.0	—N/a	7.0	**12.0**	8.0	8.0	7.0	6.0	6.0	—N/a	—N/a	—N/a	—N/a	—N/a	—N/a	—N/a
26 October 2020	STEM/Mark	9.0	**11.0**	10.0	**11.0**	8.0	—N/a	—N/a	9.0	10.0	5.0	—N/a	7.0	6.0	—N/a	—N/a	—N/a	—N/a	—N/a	—N/a	—N/a
5 May 2020	STEM/Mark	**15.0**	**14.0**	11.0	12.0	11.0	7.0	—N/a	8.0	13.0	—N/a	8.0	—N/a	—N/a	—N/a	—N/a	—N/a	—N/a	—N/a	—N/a	—N/a
14 November 2019	STEM/Mark	**17.0**	**16.0**	**16.0**	13.0	12.0	12.0	11.0	11.0	10.0	9.0	—N/a	—N/a	—N/a	—N/a	—N/a	—N/a	—N/a	—N/a	—N/a	—N/a

=== Hypothetical polling ===
Polls with Stropnický as ANO nominee
Date	Agency	Petr Pavel	Martin Stropnický	Danuše Nerudová	Jaroslav Bašta	Tomáš Březina	Pavel Fischer	Marek Hilšer	Josef Středula	Alena Vitásková	Tomáš Zima
7–12 Oct 2022	Ipsos	**32.2**	5.4	**19.9**	2.9	1.6	9.3	7.8	8.3	4.2	1.0
4–10 Oct 2022	Sanep	**19.9**	**15.9**	13.8	13.4	11.3	11.2	7.4	7.1	—N/a	—N/a
4–10 Oct 2022	Sanep	**28.8**	—N/a	23.7	**26.1**	21.4	—N/a	—N/a	—N/a	—N/a	—N/a

Polls with Schillerová as ANO nominee
Date	Agency	Petr Pavel	Danuše Nerudová	Alena Schillerová	Pavel Fischer	Karel Janeček	Marek Hilšer	Josef Středula	Alena Vitásková	Jaroslav Bašta	Tomáš Zima	Tomáš Březina
7–12 Oct 2022	Ipsos	**30.5**	**19.4**	12.4	9.2	7.5	7.3	6.1	3.1	2.5	1.0	0.8

Polls without ANO nominee
Date	Agency	Petr Pavel	Danuše Nerudová	Pavel Fischer	Josef Středula	Karel Janeček	Alena Vitásková	Marek Hilšer	Jaroslav Bašta	Tomáš Zima	Tomáš Březina
7–12 Oct 2022	Ipsos	**31.9**	**21.6**	10.1	9.4	8.2	8.0	5.3	3.5	1.1	0.9

Other polls
Date	Agency	Andrej Babiš	Miloš Vystrčil	Marek Hilšer	Pavel Fischer	Jaroslav Bašta	Jiří Paroubek	Danuše Nerudová	Miroslava Němcová	Lenka Bradáčová	Alena Schillerová	Alena Vitásková	Denisa Rohanová	Petr Pavel	Tomáš Březina	Josef Středula	Karel Janeček	Michael Kocáb	Tomáš Zima	Note
Sep–Oct 2022	Phoenix Research	**24**	**12**	6	5	5	2	—N/a	—N/a	—N/a	—N/a	—N/a	—N/a	—N/a	—N/a	—N/a	—N/a	—N/a	—N/a	Male politicians
Sep–Oct 2022	Phoenix Research	—N/a	—N/a	—N/a	—N/a	—N/a	—N/a	**19**	**15**	14	8	5	2	—N/a	—N/a	—N/a	—N/a	—N/a	—N/a	Female politicians
Sep–Oct 2022	Phoenix Research	—N/a	—N/a	—N/a	—N/a	—N/a	—N/a	—N/a	—N/a	—N/a	—N/a	—N/a	—N/a	**26**	**11**	10	9	4	2	Other personalities

== Opinion polls for the second round ==
Babiš vs Pavel

A LOESS graph displaying the polls for the second round of the 2023 Czech Presidential election

Date	Agency	Andrej Babiš	Petr Pavel
27–28 Jan 2023	2nd round result	41.7	**58.3**
20-22 Jan 2023	Median	42.1	**57.9**
20-22 Jan 2023	Ipsos	41.2	**58.8**
16-19 Jan 2023	Data Collect and Kantar CZ	38.0	**53.0**
16-18 Jan 2023	STEM	42.4	**57.6**
13-14 Jan 2023	**1st round of election**		
5–9 Jan 2023	Median	41.0	**59.0**
2–5 Jan 2023	Data Collect and Kantar CZ	41.0	**58.0**
2–4 Jan 2023	STEM	43.0	**57.0**
27–29 Dec 2022	Median	39.0	**61.0**
8-19 Dec 2022	Median	37.0	**63.0**
5–14 Dec 2022	Data Collect and Kantar CZ	42.0	**56.0**
29 Nov–9 Dec 2022	STEM	47.0	**53.0**
9 Nov–7 Dec	Median	41.0	**59.0**
1–15 Nov 2022	IPSOS	31.0	**38.0**
1–31 Oct 2022	Median	41.0	**59.0**
7–12 Oct 2022	Ipsos	38.0	**62.0**
27 Sep–3 Oct 2022	STEM/Mark	30.5	**52.5**
1–30 Sep 2022	Median	41.0	**59.0**
1–31 Aug 2022	Median	42.0	**58.0**
24 Jun–5 Aug 2022	Median	40.5	**59.5**
6 - 13 June 2022	STEM/MARK	32	**49**
2 - 13 June 2022	Sanep	**51.7**	48.3
4-22 April 2022	Sanep	**51.2**	48.8
2–10 January 2022	Sanep	**51.7**	48.3
December 2021	Ipsos	46.0	**54.0**
7–14 Dec 2021	STEM	32.0	**41.0**

=== Hypothetical polling ===
The polls listed below include candidates who decided not to run, withdrawn from election or failed to advance to second round.

Babiš vs Nerudová

Date	Agency	Andrej Babiš	Danuše Nerudová
5–9 Jan 2023	Median	40.0	60.0
2–5 Jan 2023	Data Collect and Kantar CZ	41.0	57.0
2–4 Jan 2023	STEM	43.0	57.0
27–29 Dec 2022	Median	39.0	61.0
8-19 Dec 2022	Median	36.0	64.0
5–14 Dec 2022	Data Collect and Kantar CZ	38.0	60.0
29 Nov–9 Dec 2022	STEM	43.0	57.0
9 Nov–7 Dec	Median	40.0	60.0
1–15 Nov 2022	IPSOS	**34.0**	34.0
1–31 Oct 2022	Median	43.0	57.0
7–12 Oct 2022	Ipsos	37.0	63.0
27 Sep–3 Oct 2022	STEM/Mark	31.0	46.0
1–30 Sep 2022	Median	45.0	55.0
7–14 Dec 2021	STEM	33.0	41.0

Pavel vs Nerudová

Date	Agency	Petr Pavel	Danuše Nerudová
5–9 Jan 2023	Median	**56.0**	44.0
2–5 Jan 2023	Data Collect and Kantar CZ	**50.0**	45.0
2–4 Jan 2023	STEM	**50.0**	**50.0**
27–29 Dec 2022	Median	**51.0**	49.0
8-19 Dec 2022	Median	46.0	**54.0**
5–14 Dec 2022	Data Collect and Kantar CZ	41.0	**54.0**
29 Nov–9 Dec 2022	STEM	44.0	**56.0**
1–15 Nov 2022	IPSOS	**33.0**	27.0
7–12 Oct 2022	Ipsos	**55.0**	45.0
27 Sep–3 Oct 2022	STEM/Mark	**40.0**	27.0

Babiš vs Fischer

Date	Agency	Andrej Babiš	Pavel Fischer
9 Nov–7 Dec	Median	48.0	**52.0**
1–31 Oct 2022	Median	48.0	**52.0**
27 Sep–3 Oct 2022	STEM/Mark	33.0	**44.0**
1–30 Sep 2022	Median	46.0	**54.0**
December 2021	Ipsos	**50.6**	49.4

Babiš vs Hilšer

Date	Agency	Andrej Babiš	Marek Hilšer
9 Nov–7 Dec	Median	48.0	**52.0**
1–31 Oct 2022	Median	47.0	**53.0**
1–30 Sep 2022	Median	46.0	**54.0**

Pavel vs Fischer

Date	Agency	Petr Pavel	Pavel Fischer
27 Sep–3 Oct 2022	STEM/Mark	**42.5**	19.5

Nerudová vs Fischer

Date	Agency	Danuše Nerudová	Pavel Fischer
27 Sep–3 Oct 2022	STEM/Mark	**34.0**	24.0

Babiš vs Středula

Date	Agency	Andrej Babiš	Josef Středula
9 Nov–7 Dec	Median	**55.0**	45.0
1–31 Oct 2022	Median	**50.0**	**50.0**
27 Sep–3 Oct 2022	STEM/Mark	30.5	**34.5**
1–30 Sep 2022	Median	47.0	**53.0**
7–14 Dec 2021	STEM	**36.0**	21.0

Pavel vs Středula

Date	Agency	Petr Pavel	Josef Středula
7–12 Oct 2022	Ipsos	**74.0**	26.0
27 Sep–3 Oct 2022	STEM/Mark	**50.5**	18.0

Nerudová vs Středula

Date	Agency	Danuše Nerudová	Josef Středula
27 Sep–3 Oct 2022	STEM/Mark	**42.0**	18.0

Fischer vs Středula

Date	Agency	Pavel Fischer	Josef Středula
27 Sep–3 Oct 2022	STEM/Mark	**37.5**	22.5

Babiš vs Vystrčil

Date	Agency	Andrej Babiš	Miloš Vystrčil
December 2021	Ipsos	**53.6**	46.4

Babiš vs Němcová

Date	Agency	Andrej Babiš	Miroslava Němcová
December 2021	Ipsos	**51.9**	48.1

Babiš vs Rakušan

Date	Agency	Andrej Babiš	Vít Rakušan
December 2021	Ipsos	49.6	**50.4**

Babiš vs Kalousek

Date	Agency	Andrej Babiš	Miroslav Kalousek
December 2021	Ipsos	**60**	40

Pavel vs Schillerová

Date	Agency	Petr Pavel	Alena Schillerová
7–12 Oct 2022	Ipsos	**71.0**	29.0
27 Sep–3 Oct 2022	STEM/Mark	**56.0**	21.5

Nerudová vs Schillerová

Date	Agency	Danuše Nerudová	Alena Schillerová
7–12 Oct 2022	Ipsos	**68.0**	32.0
27 Sep–3 Oct 2022	STEM/Mark	**46.0**	22.0

Pavel vs Stropnický

Date	Agency	Petr Pavel	Martin Stropnický
7–12 Oct 2022	Ipsos	**75.0**	25.0

Středula vs Schillerová

Date	Agency	Josef Středula	Alena Schillerová
27 Sep–3 Oct 2022	STEM/Mark	**34.0**	21.5

== Other polls ==
Date	Agency	Danuše Nerudová	Petr Pavel	Andrej Babiš	Pavel Fischer	Marek Hilšer	Jaroslav Bašta	Josef Středula	Tomáš Zima	Denisa Rohanová	Karel Diviš
1 Dec 2022–16 Jan 2023	Pirate Party Survey	**30.0**	**36.0**	1.0	5.0	15.0	1.0	5.0	0.0	0.0	3.0
12–13 Dec 2022	Student Election	**54.1**	25.7	9.9	3.6	2.6	1.4	1.0	0.9	0.8	—N/a

=== Prediction of who would win ===
Date	Agency	Jiří Dienstbier	Andrej Babiš	Tomio Okamura	Miroslava Němcová	Bohuslav Sobotka	Václav Klaus	Václav Klaus Jr.	Pavel Fischer	Jiří Drahoš
24 December 2018	Betting Agencies	—N/a	10.0	8.0	—N/a	—N/a	**20.0**	**15.0**	6.0	4.0
3 December 2013	Czech Radio	**15.0**	**8.6**	7.0	4.5	3.8	—N/a	—N/a	—N/a	—N/a
