= 2023 Czech presidential election debates =

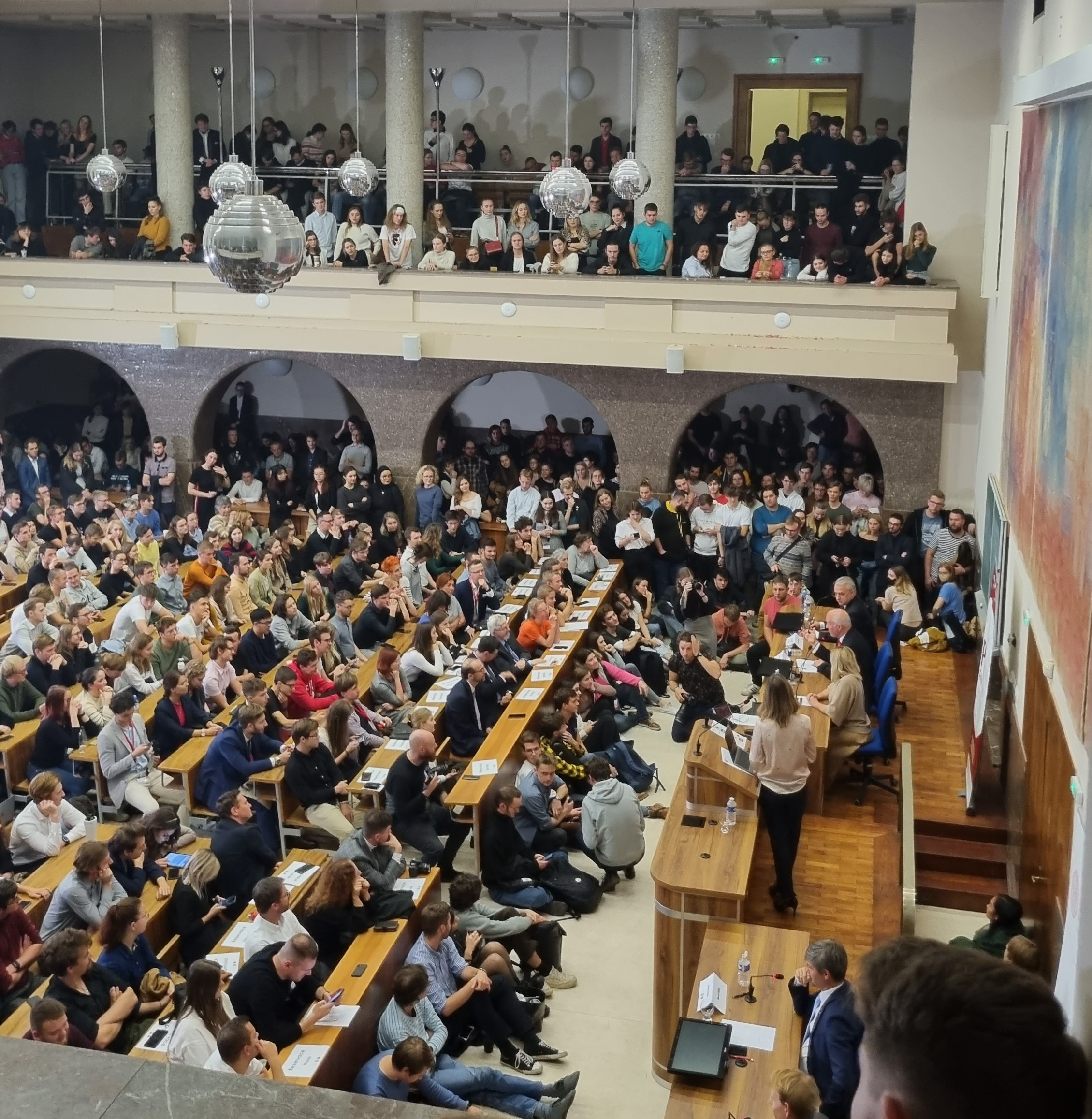
Debate at Faculty of Law, Charles University, 2 November 2022

The 2023 Czech presidential election debates are a series of debates held for the 2023 Czech presidential election.

== List of debates ==
Date	Debate	Andrej Babiš	Petr Pavel	Danuše Nerudová	Pavel Fischer	Marek Hilšer	Josef Středula	Jaroslav Bašta	Tomáš Zima	Karel Diviš	Denisa Rohanová	Karel Janeček	Source
2 November 2022	Charles University	A	A	P	P	P	P	A	A	A	A	P	
9 November 2022	University of Economics in Prague	A	A	P	P	P	P	A	A	A	A	P	
26 November 2022	iDnes	A	P	P	P	P	P	A	A	A	A	A	
1 December 2022	IKSŽ	A	P	P	P	P	P	A	A	A	A	A	
7 December 2022	Deník.cz	A	A	A	A	A	A	P	P	A	P	A	
8 December 2022	JSNS	A	P	A	P	P	P	A	A	A	A	A	
9 December 2022	Respekt	A	P	A	P	P	P	A	A	A	A	A	
13 December 2022	University Hradec Králové	A	A	A	A	P	A	P	P	P	A	A	
14 December 2022	Deník.cz	A	A	A	P	A	P	A	A	P	A	A	
3 January 2023	Blesk.cz	A	P	P	P	A	P	A	A	A	A	A	
4 January 2023	Deník.cz	A	P	P	A	A	A	A	A	A	A	A	
4 January 2023	CNN Prima News	A	A	A	P	P	P	P	P	P	A	A	
8 January 2023	Czech television	A	P	P	P	P	P	P	P	P	A	A	
11 January 2023	CNN Prima News	A	P	P	A	A	A	A	A	A	A	A	
12 January 2023	TV Nova	A	A	A	P	P (Note: Left debate after several minutes.)	A	P	P	P	A	A	
12 January 2023	TV Nova	P	P	P	A	A	A	A	A	A	A	A	
13 January 2023	Czech Radio	A	P	P	P	P	A	P	P	P	A	A	
18 January 2023	Denik.cz	P	P	A	A	A	A	A	A	A	A	A	
19 January 2023	Blesk.cz	P	P	A	A	A	A	A	A	A	A	A	
22 January 2023	Czech television	P	P	A	A	A	A	A	A	A	A	A	
25 January 2023 (Note: Originally scheduled for 23 January 2023.)	Novinky.cz	P	P	A	A	A	A	A	A	A	A	A	
25 January 2023	CNN Prima News	P	P	A	A	A	A	A	A	A	A	A	
26 January 2023	TV Nova	P	P	A	A	A	A	A	A	A	A	A	
27 January 2023	Czech Radio	P	P	A	A	A	A	A	A	A	A	A	

== Polls and Surveys ==
This section lists surveys or polls about who was the most convincing in each debate. Note that some of these may not have been professionally weighted.

Date	Debate	Conducted by	Andrej Babiš	Petr Pavel	Danuše Nerudová	Pavel Fischer	Marek Hilšer	Josef Středula	Jaroslav Bašta	Tomáš Zima	Karel Diviš	Denisa Rohanová	Karel Janeček	Source
26 November 2022	iDnes	iDnes	—N/a	30%	40%	11%	5%	14%	—N/a	—N/a	—N/a	—N/a	—N/a	
1 December 2022	IKSŽ	IKSŽ	—N/a	30%	30%		26.67%		—N/a	—N/a	—N/a	—N/a	—N/a	
4 January 2023	Deník.cz	Deník.cz	—N/a	47%	39%	—N/a	—N/a	—N/a	—N/a	—N/a	—N/a	—N/a	—N/a	
4 January 2023	CNN Prima News	CNN Prima News	—N/a	—N/a	—N/a	27.56%	5.45%	6.24%	47.37%	1.76%	11.62%	—N/a	—N/a	
8 January 2023	Czech television	iDnes	—N/a	27%	9%	44%	2%	2%	4%	1%	11%	—N/a	—N/a	
11 January 2023	CNN Prima News	CNN Prima News	—N/a	70.16%	29.84%	—N/a	—N/a	—N/a	—N/a	—N/a	—N/a	—N/a	—N/a	
12 January 2023	Nova	iDnes	24%	62%	12%	—N/a	—N/a	—N/a	—N/a	—N/a	—N/a	—N/a	—N/a	
