= Next Czech presidential election =

- By January 2028
Incumbent President
Petr Pavel
Independent

Presidential elections will be held in the Czech Republic no later than January 2028. The incumbent president Petr Pavel is eligible to run for another term, and the election will most likely be direct.

== Background ==
=== 2023 election ===
At the previous election in January 2023, Petr Pavel was elected for his first term defeating former Prime Minister Andrej Babiš. His inauguration was held on 9 March 2023.

=== Since 2023 election ===
Fortuna made a list of odds for the 2028 presidential election soon after the 2023 election. Petr Pavel was viewed as front runner. Other potential candidates with a chance to win included Prime Minister Petr Fiala, Minister of Interior Vít Rakušan and President of the Senate Miloš Vystrčil. Petr Pavel said on 6 March 2023 that he might not seek reelection, as he considers it "reasonable that a person remains in such an office for only one term". He added that when there are two presidential terms possible, the president could behave during their first term to be reelected, in order to enjoy their second term. 2023 presidential candidate Danuše Nerudová confirmed her intention to run on 20 March 2023 stating "I hope that optimism to run again won't leave me in 5 years."

On 8 March 2024, Pavel suggested for the first time that he might seek reelection. He stated that it would depend on the political and social situation and also on whether he had the support of his family. On 23 January 2026, he said he would run again if he feels he has enough public support and is in a good health condition.

On 24 January 2026, Prime Minister Andrej Babiš stated that government parties should nominate a joint candidate for the next presidential election. He said that discussion about the candidate should start in early 2027. He also confirmed that he does not plan to run himself. Petr Macinka, leader of Motorists for Themselves, stated that it made sense for government parties to run a joint candidate. On 30 July 2026, in an interview with Novinky.cz, Macinka stated that the government parties should not nominate a political candidate, but a candidate from civil society without government support.

== Candidates ==
=== Speculative ===
- Dita Charanzová, politician, former MEP (2014–2024).
- Pavel Fischer, Senator and candidate in the 2018 and 2023 elections, did not rule out becoming a candidate again when asked, commenting "you will hear from me again."
- Dominik Hašek, ice hockey player, stated in 2020 that he plans to run for president in 2028.
- Karel Janeček, mathematician, entrepreneur and 2023 candidate, did not rule out standing.
- Věra Jourová, former Minister of Regional Development, former Vice President of the European Commission for Values and Transparency and former European Commissioner for Justice, Consumers and Gender Equality from 2014 to 2019, stated on 21 February 2025 that she would closely watch who is running if Pavel decides to not run for a second term, which might "ignite a Messiah complex in [her]".
- Michael Kocáb, composer, singer, political activist and former Minister for Human Rights and Minorities, stated on 5 October 2023 that he intends to run in the next presidential election.
- Aleš Michl, Governor of the Czech National Bank.
- Danuše Nerudová, economist, MEP and candidate in the 2023 election, said on 20 March 2023 that she is interested in running.
- Pavel Novotný, Mayor of Řeporyje, stated that he will seek nomination for the 2028 election.
- Petr Pavel, the incumbent president, is eligible to run for second term.
- Alena Schillerová, MP and Minister of Finance, was discussed as a potential ANO 2011 nominee after Prime Minister Babiš stated that "a female president would suit the Czech Republic" and said he considered Schillerová an option.
- Tomáš Sedláček, economist expressed interest in running.
- Miroslav Sládek, former presidential nominee and former leader of the Rally for the Republic – Republican Party of Czechoslovakia (SPR–RSČ), co-organised a demonstration held on 9 May 2025 where he started gathering signatures for his presidential nomination. He is supported by Czech Republic in First Place!.
- Ivana Tykač, businesswoman and philanthropist.
- Marek Vašut, actor, is the subject of an online petition with more than 6,000 signatures calling for him to run for president. Vašut himself has not commented.
- Radek Vondráček, MP and former presidents of the Chamber of Deputies, confirmed his interest in running, noting that former Czech President Miloš Zeman advised him to run. In May 2026, some ANO supporters called for his candidacy on social media. In August 2026, Libor Vondráček, the leader of Svobodní elected to the Chamber of Deputies on the SPD-led list, expressed his support for Radek Vondráček's candidacy.
- Miloš Zeman, former Czech president, is eligible to run for a third non-consecutive term. In August 2026, Zeman admitted that he was tempted by the idea.

=== Declined ===
- Andrej Babiš, MP, Prime Minister and ANO 2011 nominee in the 2023 presidential election, announced on 5 April 2023 that he will not run again.
- Petr Fiala, former Prime Minister, said that some people had told him to think about running for president. On 17 January 2026, he announced that he will not run and stated that the incumbent president is doing well in the office.
- Marek Hilšer, Senator and candidate in the 2018 and 2023 elections, stated after his defeat in 2023 that he doesn't feel like running again, adding that twice is enough.

== Opinion polls ==
=== First round ===
Date	Agency	Petr Pavel	Andrej Babiš	Marek Eben	Karel Havlíček	Tomio Okamura	Danuše Nerudová	Alena Schillerová	Jiří Drahoš	Pavel Fischer	Filip Turek	Václav Klaus	Miloš Vystrčil	Petr Fiala	Vít Rakušan	Martin Kuba	Miroslava Němcová	Marek Vašut	Radek Vondráček	Petr Macinka	Miloš Zeman
31 Aug – 7 Sep 2026	STEM/MARK	36	16	11	9	7	5	5	4	5	—N/a	5	5	5	4	3	4	7	6	—N/a	8
30 Jul – 3 Aug 2026	NMS	39	15	—N/a	11	—N/a	—N/a	3	—N/a	—N/a	—N/a	—N/a	—N/a	—N/a	—N/a	—N/a	—N/a	—N/a	—N/a	—N/a	—N/a
13 Apr – 4 May 2026	STEM/MARK	34	20	9	13	8	4	8	4	4	5	—N/a	4	4	—N/a	—N/a	—N/a	6	5	5	—N/a
14 – 27 Oct 2025	STEM/MARK	37	17	12	8	5	6	7	6	6	—N/a	6	6	5	5	5	5	—N/a	—N/a	—N/a	—N/a
14 May – 1 Jun 2025	STEM/MARK	31	16	8	7	6	5	5	5	4	4	—N/a	—N/a	—N/a	—N/a	—N/a	—N/a	—N/a	—N/a	—N/a	—N/a

=== Second round ===
Pavel vs Babiš

Date	Agency	Petr Pavel	Andrej Babiš
30 Jul – 3 Aug 2026	NMS	44	37

=== Acceptability of candidates ===
Date	Agency	Petr Pavel	Andrej Babiš	Marek Eben	Karel Havlíček	Tomio Okamura	Danuše Nerudová	Alena Schillerová	Jiří Drahoš	Pavel Fischer	Filip Turek	Václav Klaus	Miloš Vystrčil	Petr Fiala	Vít Rakušan	Martin Kuba	Miroslava Němcová	Lenka Bradáčová	Marek Hilšer	Aleš Michl	Josef Středula	Ivana Tykač	Marek Vašut	Radek Vondráček	Petr Macinka	Miloš Zeman
31 Aug – 7 Sep 2026	STEM/MARK	52	40	42	32	22	26	24	28	27	13	21	23	23	23	22	—N/a	22	—N/a	9	—N/a	9	28	20	—N/a	24
13 Apr – 4 May 2026	STEM/MARK	53	44	40	35	24	25	30	24	23	17	—N/a	19	17	—N/a	—N/a	—N/a	—N/a	—N/a	—N/a	—N/a	—N/a	26	19	18	—N/a
13–17 February 2026	NMS	54	43	—N/a	39	—N/a	29	34	—N/a	33	19	—N/a	—N/a	—N/a	—N/a	—N/a	—N/a	41	39	22	19	17	—N/a	—N/a	—N/a	—N/a
14 – 27 Oct 2025	STEM/MARK	58	40	55	31	20	25	28	28	27	—N/a	20	20	22	24	26	20	—N/a	—N/a	—N/a	—N/a	—N/a	—N/a	—N/a	—N/a	—N/a
14 May – 1 Jun 2025	STEM/MARK	52	43	37	26	25	27	23	26	27	15	—N/a	—N/a	—N/a	—N/a	—N/a	—N/a	—N/a	—N/a	—N/a	—N/a	—N/a	—N/a	—N/a	—N/a	—N/a

==== Pavel's second term ====
The following polls asked people whether they wanted Petr Pavel to be president for a second term.

Date	Agency	For	Against
13–17 February 2026	NMS	51.6	39.6

=== Other polls ===
Date	Agency	Voting	Andrej Babiš	Karel Havlíček	Alena Schillerová	Miloš Zeman	Václav Klaus	Marek Eben	Radek Vondráček	Tomio Okamura	Marek Vašut	Petr Macinka	Kateřina Konečná	Jiří Čunek	Martin Kuba	Petr Pavel	Robert Šlachta
31 Aug – 7 Sep 2026	STEM/MARK	ANO 2011 voters	42%	19%	13%	13%	9%	10%	12%	8%	7%	5%	6%	3%	3%	7%	3%

=== Should ANO 2011 nominate its own candidate? ===
Date	Agency	Yes	No	Don't know/Don't care
31 Aug – 7 Sep 2026	STEM/MARK	84%	8%	8%
