= 2022 ČMKOS presidential election =

- 29 April 2022
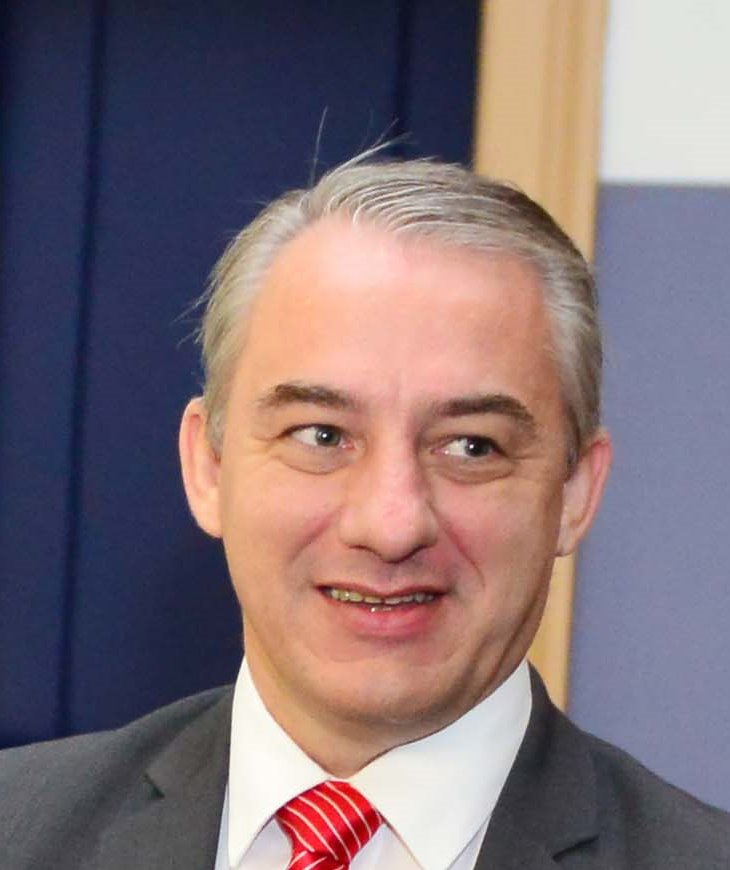
Candidate	Josef Středula
Percentage	88.4%
President before election
Josef Středula
Elected President
Josef Středula

The 2022 election of the President of the Czech-Moravian Confederation of Trade Unions (ČMKOS) was held on 29 April 2022. Josef Středula was reelected for his third term.

== Background ==
The incumbent President Josef Středula leads Czech-Moravian Confederation of Trade Unions since 2014. He was reelected in 2018. He decided to run for his third term in 2022.

== Results ==
Středula was the only candidate. 173 delegates voted. Středula received 153 votes and thus was reelected.

Voting
Candidate	Votes	%
Josef Středula	153	88.4
Invalid/None	20	11.6

== Aftermath ==
Středula's victory renewed speculations about his potential candidacy in the upcoming Czech presidential election. Středula himself admitted that he considers candidacy. The incumbent Czech president Miloš Zeman endorsed Středula for president following the election. Středula announced his candidacy on 5 May 2022.

== See also ==
- 2014 ČMKOS presidential election
