= 2026 ČMKOS presidential election =

- 24 April 2026
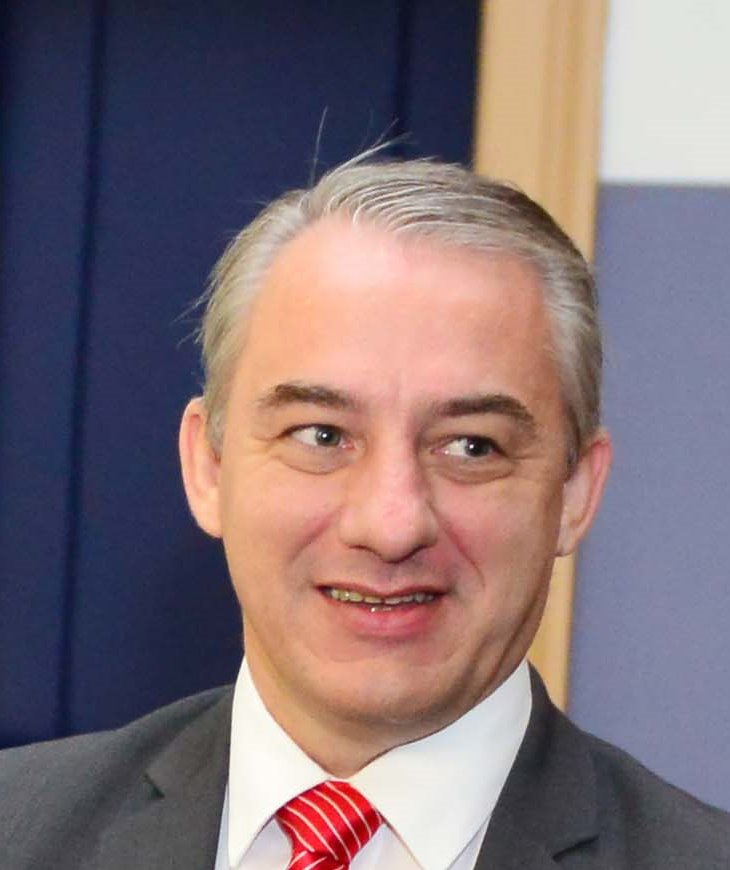

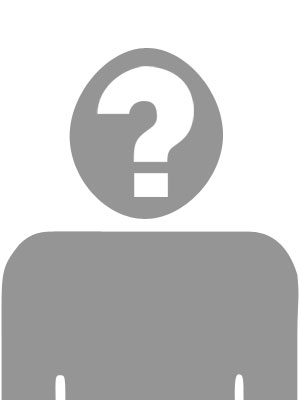

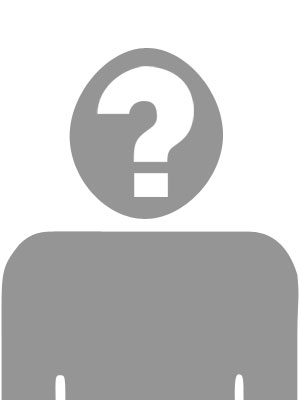
Candidate	Josef Středula	František Dobšík	Alois Mačák
Percentage	51%	43%	5%
President before election
Josef Středula
Elected President
Josef Středula

The 2026 election of the President of the Czech-Moravian Confederation of Trade Unions (ČMKOS) was held on 24 April 2026. Josef Středula was reelected for his fourth term.

== Background ==
The incumbent President Josef Středula leads Czech-Moravian Confederation of Trade Unions since 2014. He was reelected in 2018 and 2022. The union's congress was scheduled for 24 and 25 April 2026. Leadership would be part of the congress. Czech News Agency reported that according to its sources within the unions, the incumbent President Josef Středula, Vice-Chairman of the Olomouc Regional Trade Union Council Alois Mačák and chairman of the school unions František Dobšík would run.

== Results ==
176 delegates voted. Středula received 90 votes and thus was reelected.

Voting
Candidate	Votes	%
Josef Středula	90	51.1
František Dobšík	75	42.6
Alois Mačák	8	4.5

== See also ==
- 2014 ČMKOS presidential election
