= 2018 ČMKOS presidential election =

- 27 April 2018
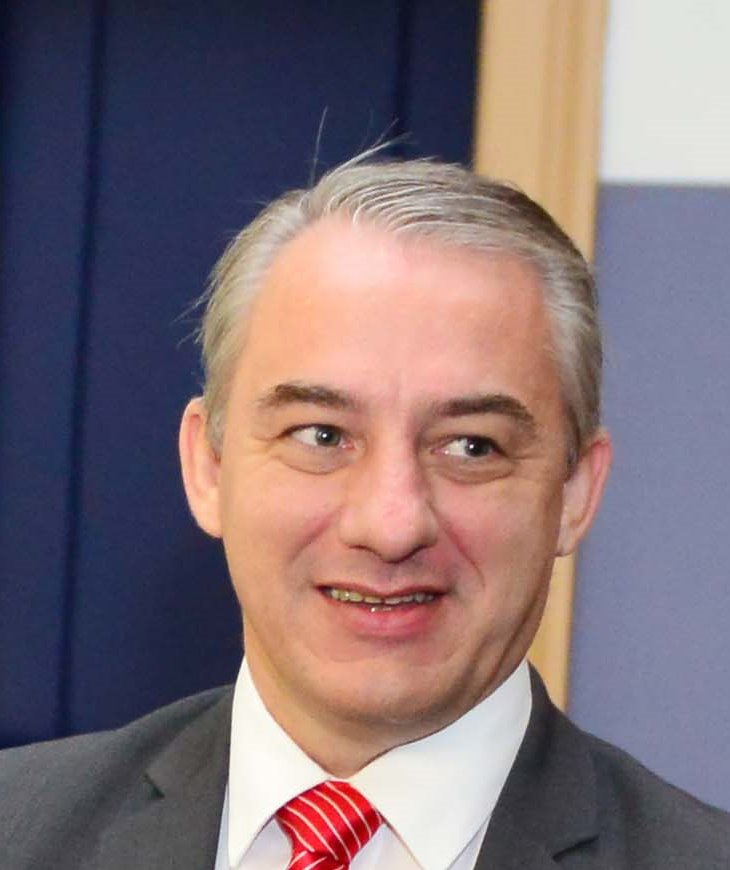
Candidate	Josef Středula
Percentage	97.9%
President before election
Josef Středula
Elected President
Josef Středula

The 2018 election of the President of the Czech-Moravian Confederation of Trade Unions (ČMKOS) was held on 27 April 2018. Josef Středula was reelected for his second term.

== Background ==
The incumbent President Josef Středula leads Czech-Moravian Confederation of Trade Unions since 2014.

== Results ==
Středula was the only candidate. 187 delegates voted. Středula received 183 votes and thus was reelected.

Voting
Candidate	Votes	%
Josef Středula	183	97.9
Invalid/None	4	2.1
