= Czech Republic in First Place! =

Czech Republic in First Place! Česká republika na prvním místě!
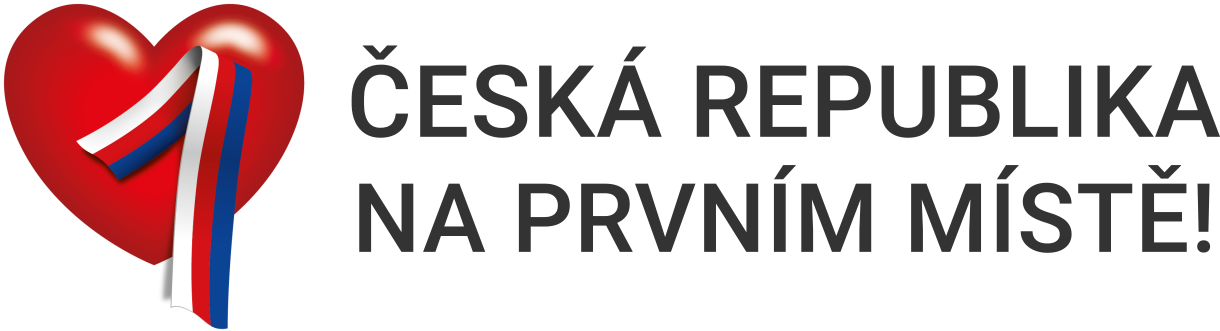
- Abbreviation: ČR1
- Leader: Ladislav Vrabel
- Ideology: Vaccine hesitancy Right-wing populism Russophilia; Euroscepticism
- Political position: Far-right
- Colours
- Chamber of Deputies: 0 / 200
- Senate: 0 / 81
- European Parliament: 0 / 21

Website
- cr1.cz

Czech Republic in First Place! (Czech: Česká republika na prvním místě!) is a Czech populist political party founded by Ladislav Vrabel in 2023.

== History ==
=== Origins and protest activities ===
Vrabel began his political career in 2021, running on the anti-vaccination "Open Czechia to Normal Life" list in the 2021 Czech parliamentary election.

After the start of the Russian invasion of Ukraine, Vrabel organized a series of protests against the Fiala Cabinet, and wrote a manifesto entitled "Plan Czech Republic in First Place". He also called on Czech President Miloš Zeman to dismiss Fiala's cabinet and name a government consisting of "experts" nominated by him.

In early October 2022, 70,000 people attended a demonstration led by Vrabel on Prague's Wenceslas Square, and similar number attended a further two demonstrations held later in the same month. At each protest, Vrabel called for the resignation of Petr Fiala and early elections. He was joined by the leaders of several extra-parliamentary parties, including the Communist Party, Svobodní, Tricolour, Swiss Democracy, Free Bloc and SD-SN. The demonstrations were labelled by some, including Fiala, as pro-Russian, and organised by "pro-Russian forces" acting against the interests of the Czech Republic.

Around the same time, information began to be reported about Vrabel's financial irregularities. It later emerged that money which Vrabel had - illegally - gathered for the organisation of the protests was instead used to buy gold. In 2023, Vrabel was formally charged with subsidies fraud by the Czech police. In late 2023, he founded Czech Republic in First Place!, seeking to run in the 2024 European elections.

=== 2024 European Parliament election ===
The party ran in the 2024 European Parliament election on a Eurosceptic platform, winning 0.23% of the vote and no seats in the European Parliament.

=== 2025 Czech parliamentary election ===
In May 2025, the party registered to run in the upcoming 2025 Czech parliamentary election. It subsequently announced its cooperation with the Rally for the Republic – Republican Party of Czechoslovakia; SPR–RSČ members will run on ČR1's list, and ČR1 will in return support SPR–RSČ's leader Miroslav Sládek in the next presidential election.

In the election, the party missed out on the threshold, receiving only 0.22% of the total vote.

== Policies ==
Vrabel claims that the party's foremost priorities are "sovereignty and peace". He also said that his party wants to leave the European Union, even without holding a referendum on the decision. When a reporter presented him with a poll suggesting that 60% of Czechs would vote to remain in the EU, Vrabel said he still believed "that the majority of people want to leave". Vrabel also said that European integration does not promote peace in Europe, and that "France is already in near civil war".

According to Vrabel, Identity and Democracy is the closest European Parliament grouping to his party, but he also stated that he would try to form a "pacifist" and eurosceptic group to improve relations with Russia, along with parties like Republic.

== Electoral results ==
=== Chamber of Deputies ===
Election	List leader	Votes	%	Seats
2025	Ladislav Vrabel	12,455	0.22	0

=== European Parliament ===
Election	List leader	Votes	%	Seats	+/−	EP Group
2024	Ladislav Vrabel	6,897	0.23 (#17)	0 / 21	New	−
