= Czech-Moravian Confederation of Trade Unions =

Trade union centre in the Czech Republic

CMKOS
- Czech-Moravian Confederation of Trade Unions
- Českomoravská konfederace odborových svazů
- Founded: March 1990
- Headquarters: Prague, Czech Republic
- Location: Czech Republic
- Members: 772,000
- Key people: Josef Středula, president
- Affiliations: ITUC, ETUC, TUAC
- Website: www.cmkos.cz

The Czech-Moravian Confederation of Trade Unions (Czech: Českomoravská konfederace odborových svazů, ČMKOS) is a trade union centre in the Czech Republic. It was founded in March, 1990 as the Czechoslovak Confederation of Trade Unions. It was re-formed in 1992 as the ČMKOS. It unites 31 different trade unions throughout the Czech Republic.

== History ==
- 2014 ČMKOS presidential election
- 2018 ČMKOS presidential election
- 2022 ČMKOS presidential election
- 2026 ČMKOS presidential election
