= Tomáš Březina =

Czech politician and businessman

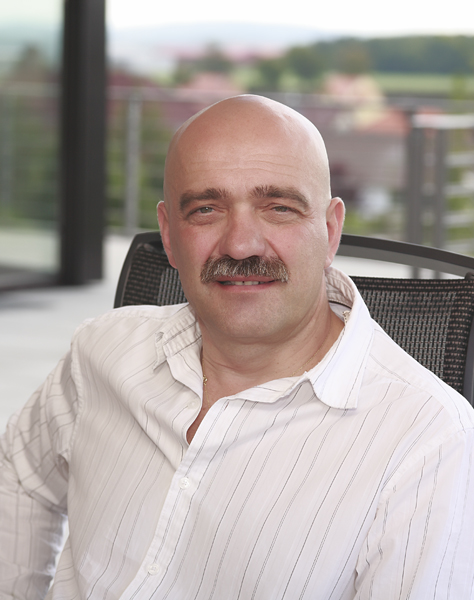

Member of the Chamber of Deputies of the Czech Republic
- In office 1 June 1996 – 12 February 1998

Personal details
- Born: February 21, 1957 (age 69) Prague, Czechoslovakia
- Party: Freedom Union – Democratic Union
- Occupation: Politician, businessman

Tomáš Březina (born 21 February 1957 in Prague) is a Czech politician and businessman.

== Personal life ==
Březina was born in Prague and raised in Husinec and Nalžovské Hory. He has three children.

== Career ==
Březina is founder and former director of BEST, one of the leading domestic manufacturers of concrete building elements. He is nicknamed the "concrete king". In the years 1996–1998, he was a member of the Chamber of Deputies of the Czech Republic for the Civic Democratic Party, later for the Freedom Union. He founded and leads the Czech Union of Concrete Workers, before that he led the Association of Garden Architecture Manufacturers. Březina was a candidate in 2023 Czech presidential election, but due to failure to meet the legal conditions for candidacy, he was disqualified from the election.
