= Barbora Rázga =

Czech politician (born 1984)

Member of the Chamber of Deputies
- Incumbent
- Assumed office 4 October 2025
- Constituency: Prague
- In office 21 October 2017 – 20 October 2021
- Constituency: Plzeň Region

Personal details
- Born: 27 September 1984 (age 41) Plzeň
- Party: ANO 2011

Barbora Rázga (née Kořanová; born 27 September 1984) is a Czech politician. She has been a member of the Chamber of Deputies since 2025, having previously served from 2017 to 2021. She has been a city councillor of Prague since 2022. From 2019 to 2022, she was a city councillor of Plzeň.
