= Denisa Rohanová =

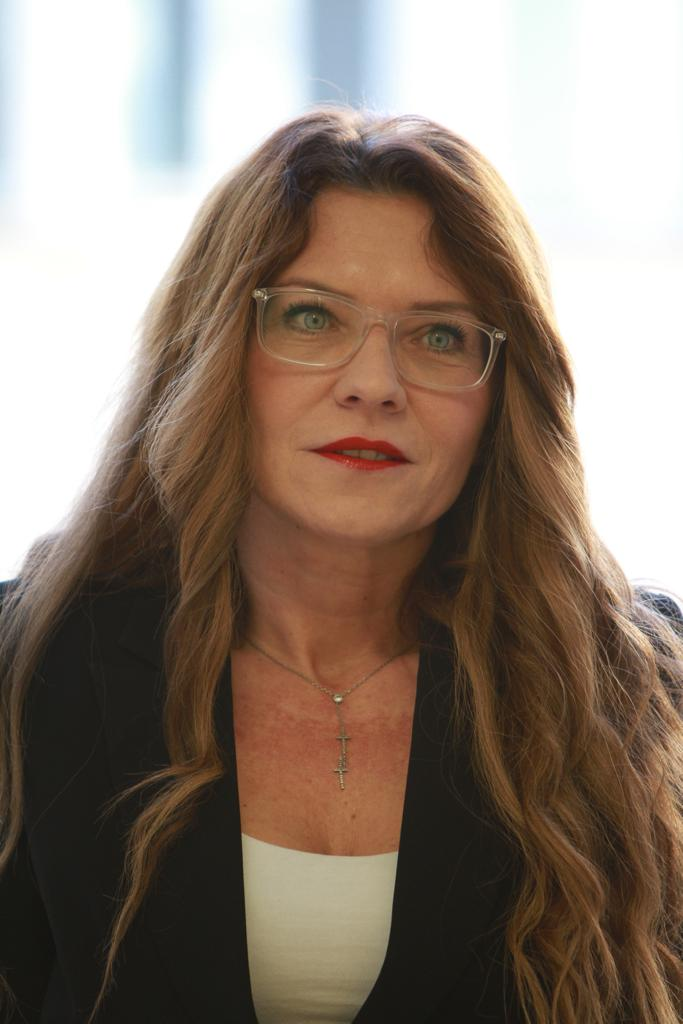

Denisa Rohanová, née Nepovímová, (born 16 April 1975 in Pardubice) is a Czech activist who focuses on helping people in debt and in Distraint. Since 2017, she has been the President of the Czech Association of Debtors.

She is a member of the board of directors of the Denisa Rohanová Foundation, which was founded by a war veteran Martin Říha.

She contributed to the introduction of the list of non-seizureable items into the enforcement order and the creation of a Methodological Instruction for the Police of the Czech Republic in the case of property enforcement.

== Political career ==
She is a former member of the ČSSD, then in the municipal elections in 2014 she unsuccessfully ran for the Kralupy nad Vltavou council as a non-party member for the Dawn of Direct Democracy. A year later, she criticized the financing of the then Úsvit.

In the elections to the Chamber of Deputies of the Czech Republic in 2017, she unsuccessfully ran as a non-party candidate for the Referendum on the European Union party. In the list of candidates, she listed her occupation as deputy assistant.

=== 2023 presidential election ===
On 1 April 2021, she announced her intention to run for President of the Czech Republic in the 2023 presidential election.

On 18 February 2022, she stated that she managed to obtain 20 signatures from members of the previous Chamber of Deputies and that she had also collected about 27,000 signatures from citizens, but then stopped collecting signatures. Her candidacy was supported by a 20 deputies. Deputies who supported her candidacy came from the ČSSD (Jiří Běhounek, Jan Birke, Jan Hamáček, Roman Onderka, Antonín Staněk, Lukáš Vágner), the Communist Party of Bohemia and Moravia (Hana Aulická Jírovcová, Stanislav Grospič, Květa Matušovská, Zdeněk Ondráček, Daniel Pawlas, Ivo Pojezný, Jiří Valenta), ANO 2011 (Jiří Bláha, Pavel Juříček, Barbora Kořanová, Přemysl Mališ, Pavel Plzák, Miloslava Rutová) and from Unified – Alternative for Patriots (Ivana Nevludová).

She submitted her candidacy by e-mail on 20 October 2021. She stated she submitted her candidacy so early due to the health problems of President Zeman, but she stated on the candidate list that she is submitting it by the proper date in 2023. The list of candidates was thus submitted on the day when all the nominating MPs expired (it was documented in writing only the next day). The submission was made even before the announcement of the presidential election on 27 June 2022. The Ministry of the Interior did not begin the process of registering her candidate list for the election of the President of the Republic until 21 October 2021, as the signed legislators were still exercising their mandate at the time of the submission of the candidate list. Ministry of Interior confirmed her registration on 25 November 2022. This was criticized by constitutional lawyers Jan Kysela and Jan Wintr, referring to the premature submission of the candidate list even before the announcement of the election date. Group of senators filed a complaint against her registration to the Supreme Administrative Court and demanded Rohanová's exclusion from the presidential election. On 13 December 2022, the electoral senate of the Supreme Administrative Court unanimously excluded her from the presidential election. Rohanová stated that she will appeal to the Constitutional Court.

Her electoral preferences hovered around 1% in opinion polls.
