= Karel Diviš =

Czech entrepreneur

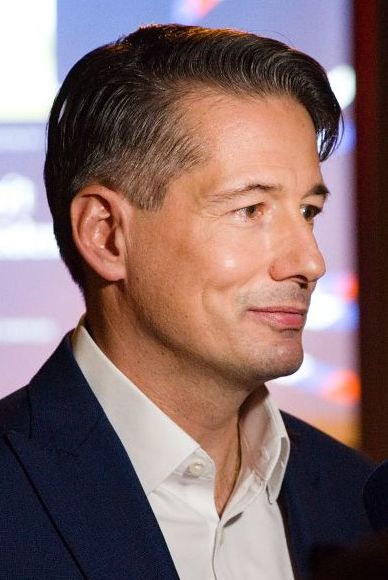
Diviš in 2022

Karel Diviš (born 24 March 1976) is a Czech entrepreneur in information technology. He was a candidate in the 2023 Czech presidential election, finishing seventh in the first round vote.

== Career ==
Diviš was born in Česká Lípa in 1976. Between 1995 and 2016, he worked as an external editor of Czech Television's sports department, as a presenter covering such events as the 2010 Winter Olympics in Vancouver and the 2010 men's football World Cup. In 2001, he founded the company IDC-softwarehouse, which created Letuska.cz, the first air ticket portal in Central and Eastern Europe. He is currently engaged in software development, operation of data centers and management of corporate information technology.

== 2023 presidential election ==
Diviš announced his candidacy for the 2023 Czech presidential election on 19 January 2022, and began collecting citizens' signatures.

His candidacy was endorsed by politician Jiří Honajzer, Alexandr Smita, the founder of the Real TOP Praha team, and chef Jiří Babica, who also helped Diviš collect signatures.

On 4 November 2022, Diviš announced that he had collected 60,000 signatures from voters.

The Ministry of the Interior rejected his candidacy on 25 November 2022, stating that after invalid signatures had been discarded, the total number of sifgnatures fell to 49,884. Diviš was thus denied candidacy by just 116 signatures. Diviš appealed against the decision. On 13 December 2022, the Supreme Administrative Court ruled that the Ministry of the Interior had incorrectly evaluated at least 34 signatures. After accounting for this, the average error rate decreased such that Diviš's total number of valid signatures was calculated at 50,007, and his candidacy was thus approved. He finished seventh of eight candidates in the first round on 14 January 2023, with 1.35% of the vote, and subsequently endorsed Petr Pavel for the second round.
