= 2014 ČMKOS presidential election =

Election

- 25 April 2014
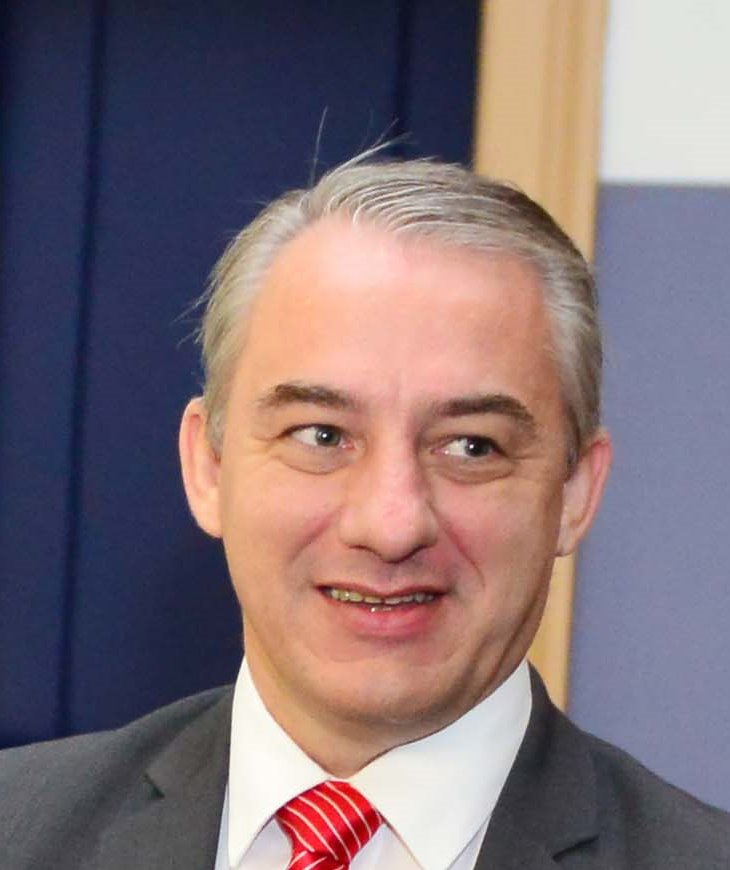

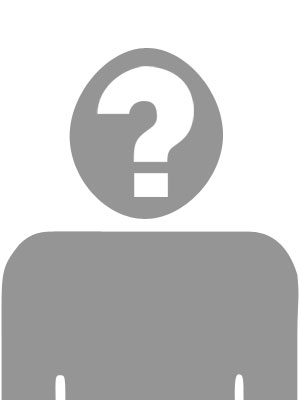
Candidate	Josef Středula	Václav Pícl
Percentage	63%	30%
President before election
Václav Pícl (acting)
Elected President
Josef Středula

The 2014 election of the President of the Czech-Moravian Confederation of Trade Unions (ČMKOS) was held on 25 April 2014. It was held following the resignation of the incumbent President Jaroslav Zavadil. Josef Středula was elected Confederation's new president after he defeated Václav Pícl.

== Background ==
The incumbent President Jaroslav Zavadil resigned on his position on 19 November 2013 after he became Member of the Chamber of Deputies in 2013 election. Václav Pícl became acting President. President of KOVO Trade Union Josef Středula announced his candidacy on the same Day. Pícl expressed his interest in running KOVO gave its nomination to Středula.

Středula and Pícl became only Candidates in the election. Pícl stated he supports Diplomatic solutions of problems and conflicts while Středula supported more radical stances stating that he would support all protests to reach goals of the Confederation.

== Results ==
Election was held on 25 April 2020. 227 Delegates were allowed to vote. Středula received 142 votes against Pícl's 67 and became the new president. Ten votes were invalid while eight delegates voted against both Candidates.

Results
Candidate	Votes	%
Josef Středula	142	62.56
Václav Pícl	67	29.52
Invalid	10	4.41
None	8	3.52
