= 2023 Czech presidential election =

- 13–14 January 2023 (first round); 27–28 January 2023 (second round)
- Turnout: 68.19% (first round) ▲6.31 pp; 70.22% (second round) ▲3.65 pp
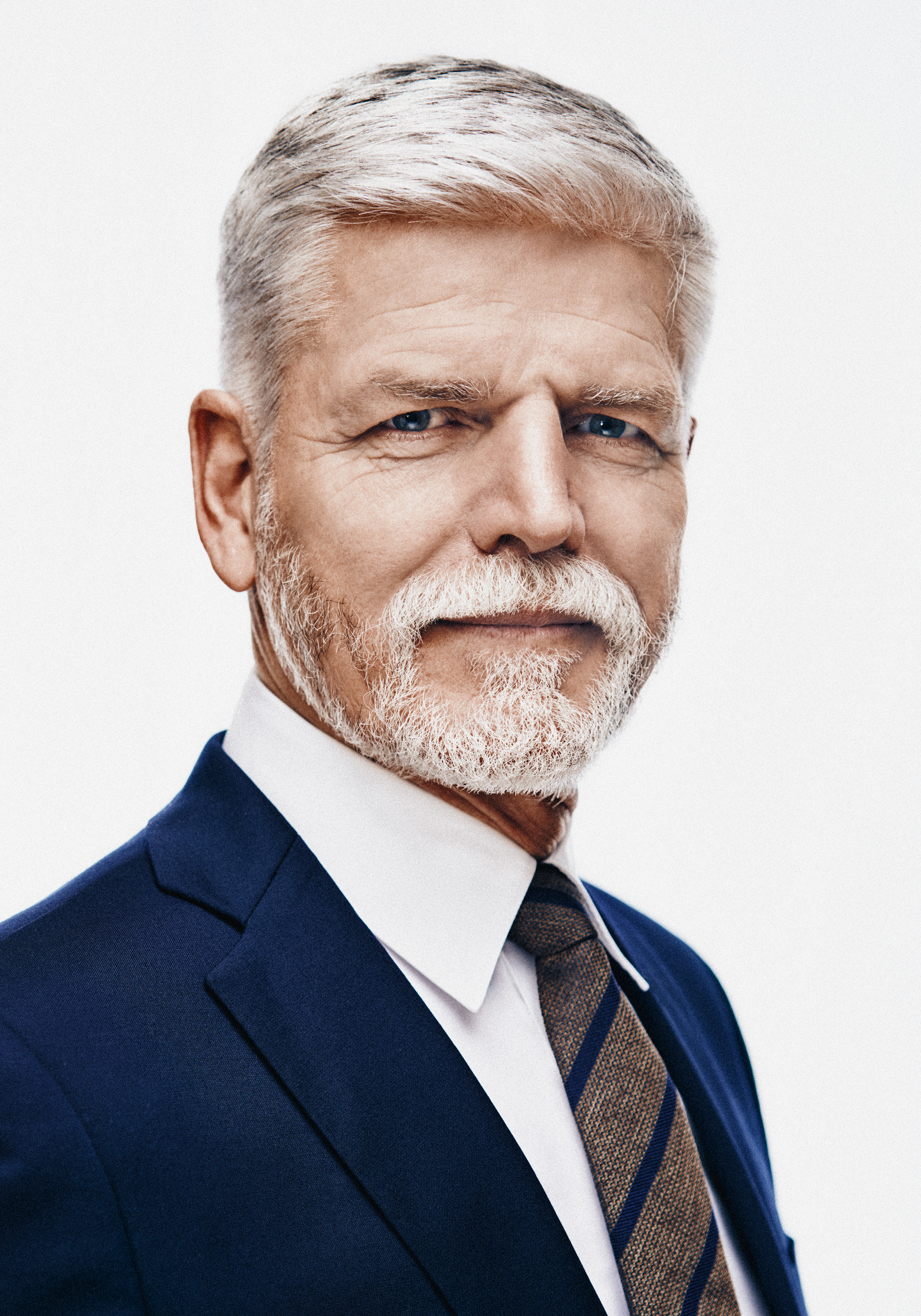

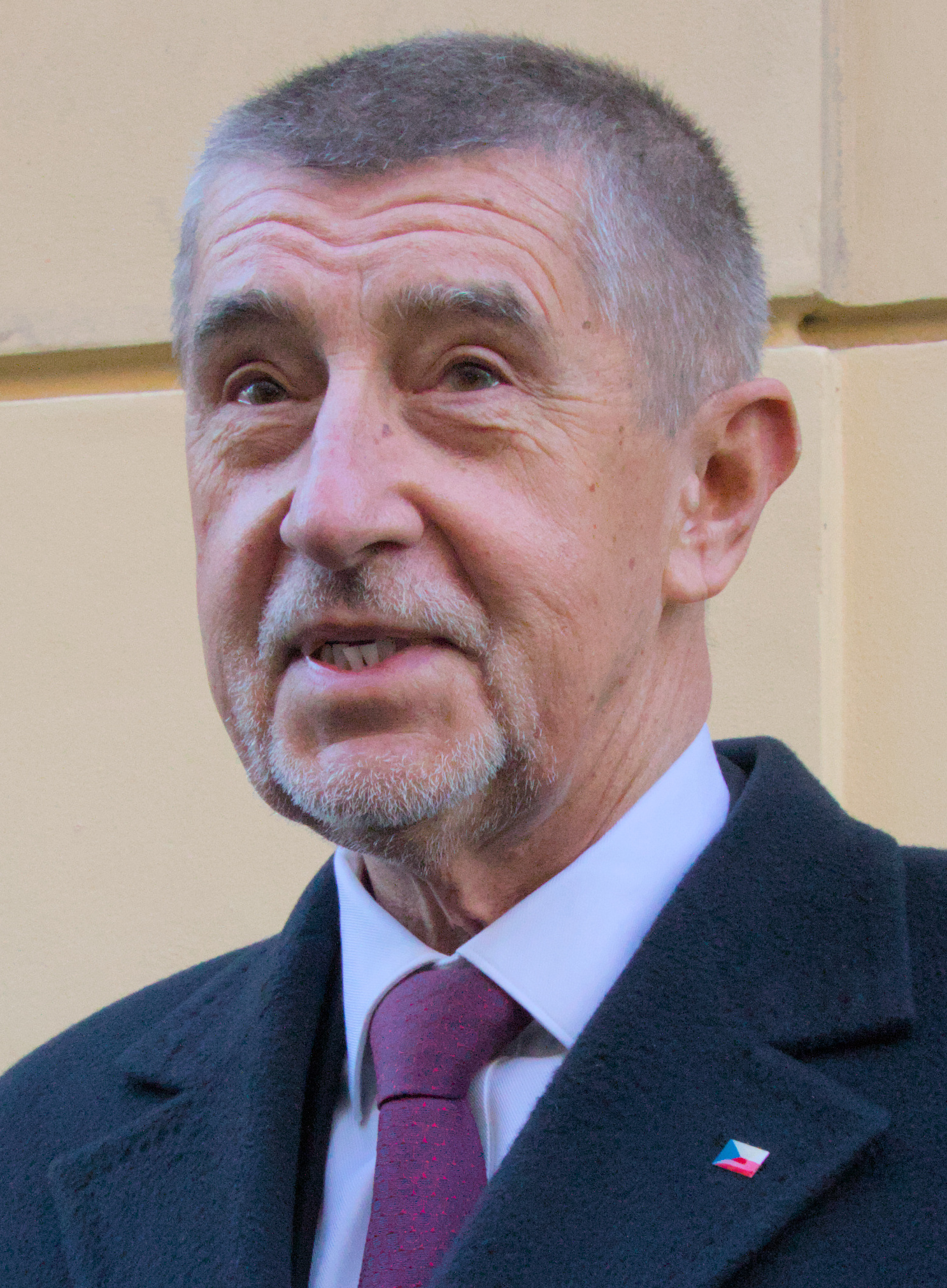
Candidate	Petr Pavel	Andrej Babiš
Party	Independent	ANO
Popular vote	3,359,151	2,400,046
Percentage	58.33%	41.67%
President before election
Miloš Zeman
SPO
Elected President
Petr Pavel
Independent

Presidential elections were held in the Czech Republic in January 2023, resulting in the election of Petr Pavel. Incumbent president Miloš Zeman was not eligible to run due to the two-term limit.

The first round took place on 13 and 14 January. Petr Pavel, former chair of the NATO Military Committee, ran as an independent on a pro-Western, pro-European platform, and was one of three candidates backed by the centre-right governing alliance Spolu. He won the first round of the election with 35.40% of the popular vote, ahead of Andrej Babiš, the former Czech prime minister running as the candidate of ANO, who finished second with 34.99%. Babiš had expressed opposition to Czech support for Ukraine after the Russian invasion and was characterised in the media as using populist rhetoric. For the runoff, Pavel was backed by most eliminated candidates and by the incumbent prime minister Petr Fiala, while Babiš received an endorsement from the Communist Party of Bohemia and Moravia and the outgoing president Zeman.

The second round was held on 27 and 28 January. Pavel won the runoff against Babiš with 58.33% of the vote to become the president-elect. He assumed office on 9 March 2023, replacing Zeman. Babiš conceded defeat and congratulated Pavel. Voter turnout in the second round was a little above 70%, the highest in a direct Czech presidential election and the highest in any national Czech election since 1998.

The campaign was widely described in the media as divisive. The outcome of the election was viewed as a sign of support for the West in the context of the war in Ukraine, and is expected to strengthen Czech ties with the European Union and the United States.

== Background ==
=== Before 2020 ===
Initial speculation about the 2023 election began after the first direct presidential election in 2013. Political scientist Ladislav Cabada said that he expected the new president to be younger than Miloš Zeman when he was elected in 2013. Jiří Dienstbier Jr. was often mentioned as a potential left-wing candidate. Cabada mentioned Petr Fiala as a possible right-wing candidate. There was also speculation that ANO 2011 leader Andrej Babiš, who later became Prime Minister of the Czech Republic, might run for president in 2023. At the previous election in January 2018, Zeman was elected for his second and final term. After Zeman's victory in 2018, there was speculation that the next election might be held sooner than 2023 due to Zeman's health. Speculation about possible successors to Zeman started soon after the election, with bookmakers considering Václav Klaus Jr. as the favourite. Babiš stated that his party would nominate its own candidate for the next election.

In summer 2019, the leaders of the opposition Civic Democratic Party, Pirate Party, KDU-ČSL, TOP 09 and Mayors and Independents met to discuss a possible common candidate. The most discussed candidate was retired army general Petr Pavel. Other names included Miroslava Němcová and Věra Jourová. The Czech Social Democratic Party was also invited to the meeting but declined as it planned to support Josef Středula, the president of the Bohemian-Moravian Confederation of Trade Unions. Speculation about Zeman's health was renewed in October 2019 when Zeman went into hospital and talked about his possible successors, noting Babiš, Josef Středula, and Vladimír Dlouhý. Senator Marek Hilšer announced his candidacy on 21 November 2019. He started gathering signatures for his nomination on the same day.

=== After 2020 ===
Pavel launched an initiative called "Stronger Together" in April 2020, aimed at helping those working in the fight against the coronavirus pandemic, especially in crowdfunding financial support for volunteers helping in hospitals or creating medical tools. Political commentators including Petr Holec and Ondřej Leinert suggested that the initiative was a launch of Pavel's presidential bid, noting the similarity with Hillary Clinton's slogan during the 2016 United States presidential election. Pavel said in July 2021 that he planned to run for the presidency and was preparing his campaign. Pavel also visited various regions, which was described by journalists including Tereza Šídlová as a campaign activity.

The 2021 legislative election resulted in defeat for ANO 2011 and a majority for the opposition parties in the Chamber of Deputies. This prompted speculation that Babiš might run for the presidency following his defeat in the legislative election. Following the election on 10 October, Zeman was hospitalised again, casting doubts over how and when the government formation talks would be held. On 11 October, a spokesman for the hospital said that Zeman's condition had stabilised, but he could not yet talk about the prognosis: "The reason for [Zeman's] hospitalization are complications from the illnesses for which he has been receiving treatments." Fiala, the leader of the Spolu coalition, stated on 12 October 2021 that the alliance would nominate a candidate.

On 18 October 2021, Miloš Vystrčil, the president of the Senate of the Czech Republic, announced he had received a letter from the Central Military Hospital declaring Zeman unfit to fulfil his duties as the president, and indicated plans to trigger Article 66 of the constitution to temporarily remove Zeman from office. In response, the Senate announced their intention to transfer Zeman's constitutional powers to Babiš and the speaker of the Chamber of Deputies Radek Vondráček, also of ANO 2011. However, he was discharged from hospital on 27 November 2021 and resumed his duties. Babiš stated on 20 November 2021 that he would run for the presidency if his supporters gathered the required 50,000 signatures. Security analyst Miloslav Ondra launched an initiative to do so and started gathering signatures at Anděl metro station on 1 December 2021, reaching 200 signatures. According to Ondra, he had around 50 gathering stations across the Czech Republic.

== Candidates ==
To qualify for the ballot, a candidate had to gather 50,000 signatures from citizens or the support of twenty deputies or ten senators. The candidate must file their application and signatures 66 days before the election, following which the Interior Ministry will verify a sample of the signatures.

Official candidates
Candidate	Party	Office(s) held	Signatures	Notes
Andrej Babiš	ANO	Prime Minister (2017–2021); First Deputy Prime Minister & Minister of Finance (2014–2017); Leader of ANO (since 2011)	56 deputies	Babiš said in November 2021 that he would run in the upcoming presidential election if his supporters gathered enough signatures. On 1 December 2021, security analyst Miloslav Ondra launched an initiative to gather signatures for Babiš's candidacy. He announced his candidacy on 30 October 2022.
Jaroslav Bašta	SPD (Note: Received support from the Tricolour Citizens' Movement)	Ambassador to Ukraine (2007–2010); Ambassador to Russia (2000–2005); Minister without Portfolio (1998–2000)	20 deputies	Bašta is the candidate of Freedom and Direct Democracy, and was also endorsed by the Tricolour Citizens' Movement.
Karel Diviš	Independent	–	50,007 signatures	Diviš, a businessman in the field of information technology, announced his candidacy in January 2022. He submitted 61,000 signatures, but the total was reduced following sample analysis to 49,884, just below the requirement. He submitted a complaint to the Supreme Administrative Court and was eventually registered as a candidate.
Pavel Fischer	Independent (Note: Received support from the Spolu alliance of ODS, KDU-ČSL and TOP 09.)	Senator from Prague 12 (since 2018); Ambassador to France (2003–2010)	19 deputies and 32 senators	Fischer, a 2018 presidential candidate, announced his candidacy on 13 October 2018 after being elected to the Senate. There was some speculation in the media that he could become the nominee of the Civic Democratic Party if he joined its Senate caucus, but he decided to remain independent. He was one of three candidates supported by Spolu.
Marek Hilšer	Marek Hilšer to the Senate	Senator from Prague 2 (since 2018)	14 senators	Hilšer announced his candidacy on 21 November 2019.
Danuše Nerudová	Independent	Rector of Mendel University in Brno (2018–2022)	82,628 signatures	Nerudová announced her candidacy on 31 May 2022. She was one of three candidates supported by Spolu.
Petr Pavel	Independent	Chairman of the NATO Military Committee (2015–2018); Chief of the General Staff of the Czech Army (2012–2015)	81,000 signatures	Pavel announced his candidacy on 29 June 2022. He is one of three candidates supported by Spolu.
Tomáš Zima	Independent	Rector of Charles University (2014–2022)	13 senators	Zima announced his candidacy on 26 May 2022.

=== Disqualified ===
- Tomáš Březina submitted 70,000 signatures, but after two samples of each petition were checked and the total number reduced according to the error rate, the number fell below the required 50,000, and Březina was thus disqualified. He initially announced his intention to submit a complaint to the Supreme Administrative Court, but subsequently decided not to submit the complaint and withdrew from the election. Despite this, he maintained that his appeal would have been successful.
- Václav Hačecký
- Roman Hladík
- Terezie Holovská
- Jiří Horváth
- Libor Hrančík
- Karel Janeček submitted 73,000 signatures, but this total was reduced following sample analysis to 48,000, below the requirement. He submitted a complaint to the Supreme Administrative Court. His complaint was rejected by the court on 13 December 2022 because he was still found to be 80 signatures short of the required 50 000.
- Anna Kašná
- Jiří Kotáb submitted his candidacy application after the deadline.
- Roman Lalik
- Denisa Rohanová, president of the Czech Association of Debtors, announced her candidacy on 1 April 2021. She submitted her nomination on 21 October 2021, the last day before the end of electoral term of the 2017 Chamber of Deputies, supported by signatures from 20 deputies who were not reelected in the 2021 election. She was initially registered as a candidate, which was met with criticism from constitutional lawyers such as Jan Kysela and Jan Wintr, who argued that her application should have been rejected due to being filed prematurely, before the official announcement of the presidential election on 27 June 2022. Her registration was contested before the Supreme Administrative Court by several senators, and she was subsequently disqualified from the election by a court ruling.
- Josef Roušal
- Milan Tomeček
- Pavel Zítko

=== Withdrawn ===
- Josef Středula, president of the Bohemian-Moravian Confederation of Trade Unions was running with the nominations of 11 Senators. Středula announced his candidacy on 5 May 2022, having long been speculated as a potential candidate. ČSSD had already confirmed that it would nominate him, and endorsed his candidacy. He later withdrew his candidacy during a debate on 8 January 2023.
- Hynek Blaško, retired Czech Army major general MEP and former member of SPD, announced he would run if his supporters gathered the required 50,000 signatures. His candidacy was supported by the Workers' Party of Social Justice (DSSS). He failed to gather enough signatures and subsequently withdrew from the election.
- Ivo Mareš, a theologian, announced his candidacy on 3 May 2022. He withdrew on 2 November 2022 having failed to gather enough signatures.
- Jakub Olbert, leader of We Will Open Czechia, announced his candidacy and started gathering signatures on 19 October 2021. He failed to gather enough signatures and withdrew from the election.
- Josef Skála was confirmed as the Communist Party candidate on 2 February 2022. He withdrew his candidacy on 7 November 2022, as he had gathered only 36,000 signatures.
- Klára Long Slámová, a lawyer, announced her candidacy in May 2021. She withdrew in 2022.
- Alena Vitásková, Chair of the Energy Regulatory Office, announced her candidacy on 24 January 2022. She said she had gathered 65,000 signatures, but on 8 November 2022 she withdrew her candidacy.

=== Other announced candidates ===
The following individuals announced they were running but in the end did not submit their candidacy papers. Some of them had started collecting signatures.

- Jiří Paroubek, former Prime Minister and leader of ČSSD, announced his intention to run for president in February 2018.
- Jaromír Soukup, a businessman and TV presenter, announced his candidacy on 16 April 2019.
- Martin Uhlíř, a political activist, announced his intention to run on 12 April 2018.

=== Declined ===
- Marek Eben, a television host, had appeared as a leading candidate in some early opinion polls, but has since stated that he does not have any ambition to run.
- Petr Fiala, Prime Minister of the Czech Republic, was speculated to be a possible candidate following his visit to Kyiv, but ruled himself out.
- Miroslav Kalousek, former Finance Minister and leader of TOP 09, stated on 5 December 2021 that he was seriously considering running, but eventually decided not to run.
- Václav Klaus Jr., former MP, was considered by bookmakers as a favourite to become president following the 2018 presidential election, and he did not rule out becoming a candidate. Political scientists such as Jan Kubáček said they believed that Klaus was planning to run for the presidency. He later ruled out his candidacy during an interview for Seznam Zprávy.
- Tomio Okamura, leader of SPD, was mentioned in the media as a possible candidate. SPD eventually nominated a different candidate.
- Miroslava Němcová, ODS MP, was called on to stand by opponents of Zeman after his inauguration in 2018. She declined to run.
- Tomáš Pojar, an expert on foreign affairs and security, was discussed as a potential candidate of Spolu (ODS, KDU-ČSL and TOP 09).
- Vít Rakušan, leader of Mayors and Independents, initially did not rule out running, but ruled out his candidacy on 22 December 2021.
- Miloš Vystrčil, ODS Senator and the President of the Senate, was called upon by supporters to run in June 2020 after he announced his decision to visit Taiwan. He declined to run.

== Campaign ==
On 27 June 2022 the date of election was scheduled for 13 and 14 January 2023, with the second round scheduled for 27 and 28 January if necessary.

=== Declarations and nominations ===
Janeček, a billionaire entrepreneur and anti-corruption activist, announced his candidacy on 21 January 2022, launching his campaign with the slogan "This is Us." Janeček said he was annoyed by the lying, manipulation and populism in politics. On 14 February 2022, anti-lockdown activist Jakub Olbert stated that he had gathered 30,000 signatures for his candidacy. Rohanová announced on 18 February that she had submitted her candidacy signed by 20 MPs of the Chamber of Deputies who were elected in the 2017 election, saying she had met the requirements to qualify for the ballot. Her opinion was challenged by constitutional lawyer Jan Kysela, who argued that Rohanová could not use the signatures of former MPs. Rohanová stated that she was still intending to collect 50,000 signatures from citizens, and had already gathered 27,000.

Středula announced his candidacy and began collecting signatures on 5 May 2022. The leader of the Czech Social Democratic Party, Michal Šmarda, announced that his party would likely support Středula's candidacy. He was also endorsed by Zeman. Former Rector of Charles University Zima announced his candidacy on 26 May 2022. On 27 May 2022, SPD MEP Blaško announced his intention to run for president. His candidacy was endorsed by DSSS. Nerudová declared her candidacy on 31 May 2022. On 20 June 2022, Březina announced he had gathered the required 50,000 signatures.

Pavel confirmed his intention to run on 29 June 2022, saying that he would launch his campaign officially in August 2022. Pavel stated that he wanted to win the election so that the Czech Republic would not have to feel ashamed by its president. In July 2022 Zima launched his campaign and started gathering signatures. He used an old ambulance for his campaign to represent his relationship to the health system. Pavel officially announced his candidacy on 6 September 2022 when he launched his campaign, with the slogan "Let's bring order and peace back to the Czech Republic". Karel Janeček launched his campaign on 7 September 2022 at the VR Play Park. He appeared in front of journalists in a VR suit to say that anybody could visit his Metaverse platform to submit their signature. Janeček was reported to be the first political candidate to use the Metaverse in his campaign. He said he would appear in the Metaverse on scheduled occasions to answer questions. On 10 September 2022, SPD announced it would nominate Bašta for the presidency.

On 27 September 2022, Pavel announced he had gathered 55,000 signatures, enough to participate in the election. On 3 October 2022, Fischer confirmed his candidacy, saying that he would launch his campaign in late October 2022. On 4 October 2022, Spolu leader and Prime Minister Petr Fiala confirmed that Spolu would not nominate its own candidate, and would instead endorse three candidates whose views were considered closest to those of ODS, KDU-ČSL and TOP 09, namely Fischer, Nerudová and Pavel.

On 10 October 2022 Fischer announced that he had gathered 10 signatures from Senators, allowing him to run. Karel Janeček admitted on 11 October 2022 that he had failed to gather 50,000 signatures, so he was seeking nominations from senators. On 12 October 2022 it was reported that Cyril Svoboda, former leader of KDU-ČSL, had started gathering signatures in the Senate to allow him to run. Svoboda initially refused to comment, but on 13 October confirmed he would not be running as he had failed to gather enough signatures. Nerudová announced on the same day she had gathered enough signatures to submit her candidacy. On 14 October 2022 Hilšer confirmed he had gathered the signatures of 14 Senators allowing him to run. Tomáš Zima also announced on 18 October 2022 that he had collected signatures from 13 senators allowing him to run. Zima said he had collected 37,000 from citizens so far, and could have over 50,000 by November, but had decided to insure himself with senators' signatures. Pavel Fischer launched his campaign on 18 October 2022, with the slogan "The Czech Republic in First Place". He said his priorities were respect for tradition, democracy and human rights, society's resistance to hostile influences, economic development, and the economic independence of the Czech Republic.

On 30 October 2022, Babiš announced his candidacy as the nominee of his party. Pavel said that Babiš's candidacy was to be expected. He added that Babiš would breathe new life into the debates but that his candidacy was "a threat to the Czech Republic". Nerudová noted that Babiš had been unable to find a better candidate than himself and decided to run despite forecasts not giving him much chance.

=== Official campaign ===
On 8 January 2023, Středula withdrew his candidacy and endorsed Nerudová.

Several candidates for president support LGBT rights such as same-sex marriage and adoptions including: Danuše Nerudová, Petr Pavel, Marek Hilšer, and Josef Středula. Tomáš Zima also expressed support for same-sex marriage.

During the presidential election campaign, Fischer expressed his support for the right to keep and bear arms, stating that he considered it "correct for adult citizens to have the basic ability to handle firearms, to know how to make them safe or check that they are unloaded". Fischer further said that as president, he would veto restrictions on the legal possession of firearms by civilians.

Babiš's prospects in the election were said to have improved at the beginning of January 2023, after he was cleared by the Municipal Court in Prague in an alleged fraud case involving misuse of EU subsidies.

=== Second round ===
After finishing first in the first round, Pavel was considered to be the favourite in the second round. He organised rallies in Ústí nad Labem, Ostrava, Brno and Prague, which were attended by thousands of people.

In a press conference after the results were announced, Babiš attacked Pavel's former past with the Communist Party of Czechoslovakia, likening him to Vladimir Putin, a statement ridiculed by Babiš's critics. He later attempted to portray Pavel as a warmonger; Babiš's billboard campaign saying "I will not drag Czechia into war. I'm a diplomat, not a soldier." was criticised by the Czech Minister of Defence Jana Černochová and other politicians.

Before the second round election, Pavel became the target of several false claims online, including rumours of his death. Some commentators described these claims as the largest online disinformation campaign in Czech history. Shortly after the first round, a string of text messages claiming to be from Pavel, instructing people to "report to the nearest branch of the Armed Forces" for conscription in the Russo-Ukrainian war, were reported to the police for investigation. Pavel denied that he had sent them and accused Babiš's campaign of organising them. Pavel's website was attacked by hackers linked to Russia multiple times. Meanwhile, Babiš and his family were targeted by several death threats.

Babiš's statement during a debate questioning Czech assistance to NATO allies triggered strong criticism from governments of several NATO countries, notably Poland and of the Baltic states, and prompted Pavel to pledge that if elected he would visit Poland to reassure it that the Czech Republic would provide military support for its allies if they were attacked.

=== Campaign finances ===
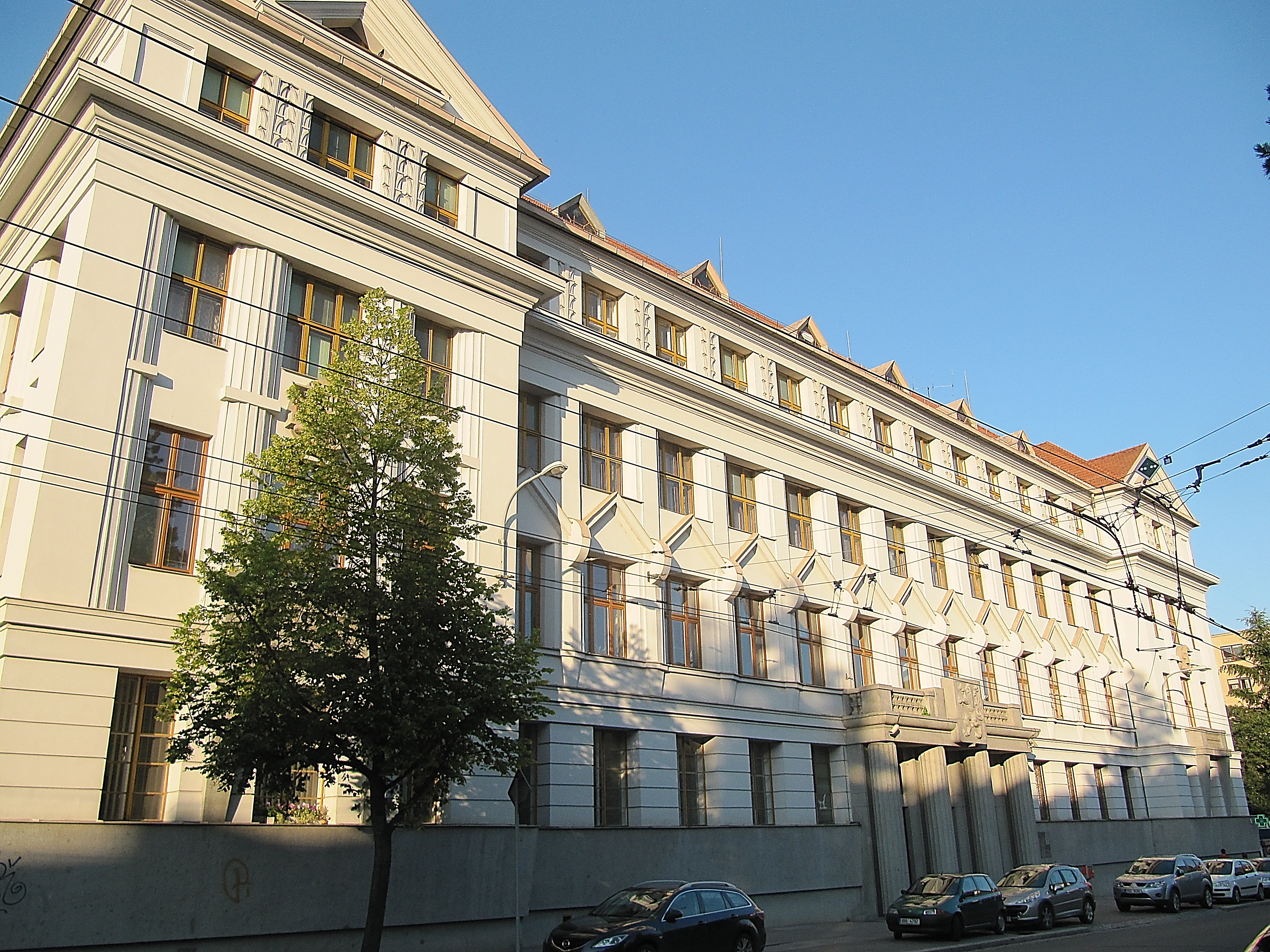
Office for the Supervision of the Management of Political Parties and Political Movements

Candidate	Money raised (CZK)	Services cost (CZK)	Money Spent (CZK)	Debt (CZK)	Source
Petr Pavel	52,266,437.31 CZK	137,600 CZK	49,999,646.15 CZK	0 CZK	
Andrej Babiš	0 CZK	49,324,028.21 CZK	49,324,028.21 CZK	0 CZK	
Danuše Nerudová	34,123,850 CZK	986,253 CZK	36,737,995.39 CZK	0 CZK	
Karel Janeček	0 CZK	0 CZK	36,082,344.55 CZK	0 CZK	
Josef Středula	9,650,126.15 CZK	0 CZK	9,650,126.15 CZK	0 CZK	
Karel Diviš	7,944,773.80 CZK	0 CZK	7,944,773.80 CZK	0 CZK	
Pavel Fischer	4,646,108.03 CZK	4,646,108.03 CZK	6,106,248.13 CZK	0 CZK	
Tomáš Zima	3,040,966 CZK	2,255,955.46 CZK	5,526,978.48 CZK	0 CZK	
Marek Hilšer	1,748,965.65 CZK	101,000 CZK	1,849,630.63 CZK	0 CZK	
Denisa Rohanová	34,400.08 CZK	703,825 CZK	743,125 CZK	0 CZK	
Alena Vitásková	686,278 CZK	0 CZK	859,093.40 CZK	0 CZK	
Josef Skála	572,773.20 CZK	0 CZK	730,345.38 CZK	0 CZK	
Hynek Blaško	11,000 CZK	80,500 CZK	91,317 CZK	0 CZK	

== Endorsements ==
ANO and SPD were the only parties to nominate their own candidates. ANO nominated its leader Babiš, while SPD nominated Bašta, a member of the Chamber of Deputies.

ODS, KDU-ČSL and TOP 09 confirmed in September 2022 that they would not nominate a joint candidate, and decided to endorse three candidates: Fischer, Nerudová and Pavel. ČSSD endorsed Josef Středula, who subsequently withdrew and endorsed Nerudová.

The Czech Pirate Party launched a survey of party members to determine which candidate to endorse. Pavel led the ballot with 37% of votes. Nerudová finished second with 30% while Hilšer was third with 15%. The party decided not to endorse any candidate, but advised its supporters to vote for a candidate who would bring dignity to the institution of the presidency, and unite people and honour the constitution and law instead of dividing society.

The Communist Party of Bohemia and Moravia nominated Skála, who failed to gather enough signatures and withdrew. Party leader Kateřina Konečná subsequently stated that the party would only endorse a candidate who asked for support.

The Tricolour Citizens' Movement, Alliance of National Forces (ANS), PES Movement and Manifest.cz endorsed Bašta. Moravané sent a questionnaire to all candidates to determine which candidate to endorse. The Workers' Party of Social Justice endorsed Blaško, who failed to gather enough signatures, and eventually endorsed Bašta.

Svobodní held a survey among its members. Janeček, who had already been disqualified from the election, was the most popular candidate with 28.26% of votes. 27.83% voted to support nobody, 18.70% voted to support Bašta, 6.09% voted to support Diviš, 5.22% voted to support Pavel, 4.78% voted to support Nerudová, and 4.35% voted to support Fischer. The party decided not to endorse any candidate, stating that none of them shared the party's values.

=== Candidate endorsements ===
Candidate	Endorsement
Karel Diviš	Petr Pavel
Pavel Fischer	Petr Pavel
Marek Hilšer	Petr Pavel
Danuše Nerudová	Petr Pavel
Tomáš Zima	No endorsement
Jaroslav Bašta	No endorsement

== Opinion polls ==
=== First round ===
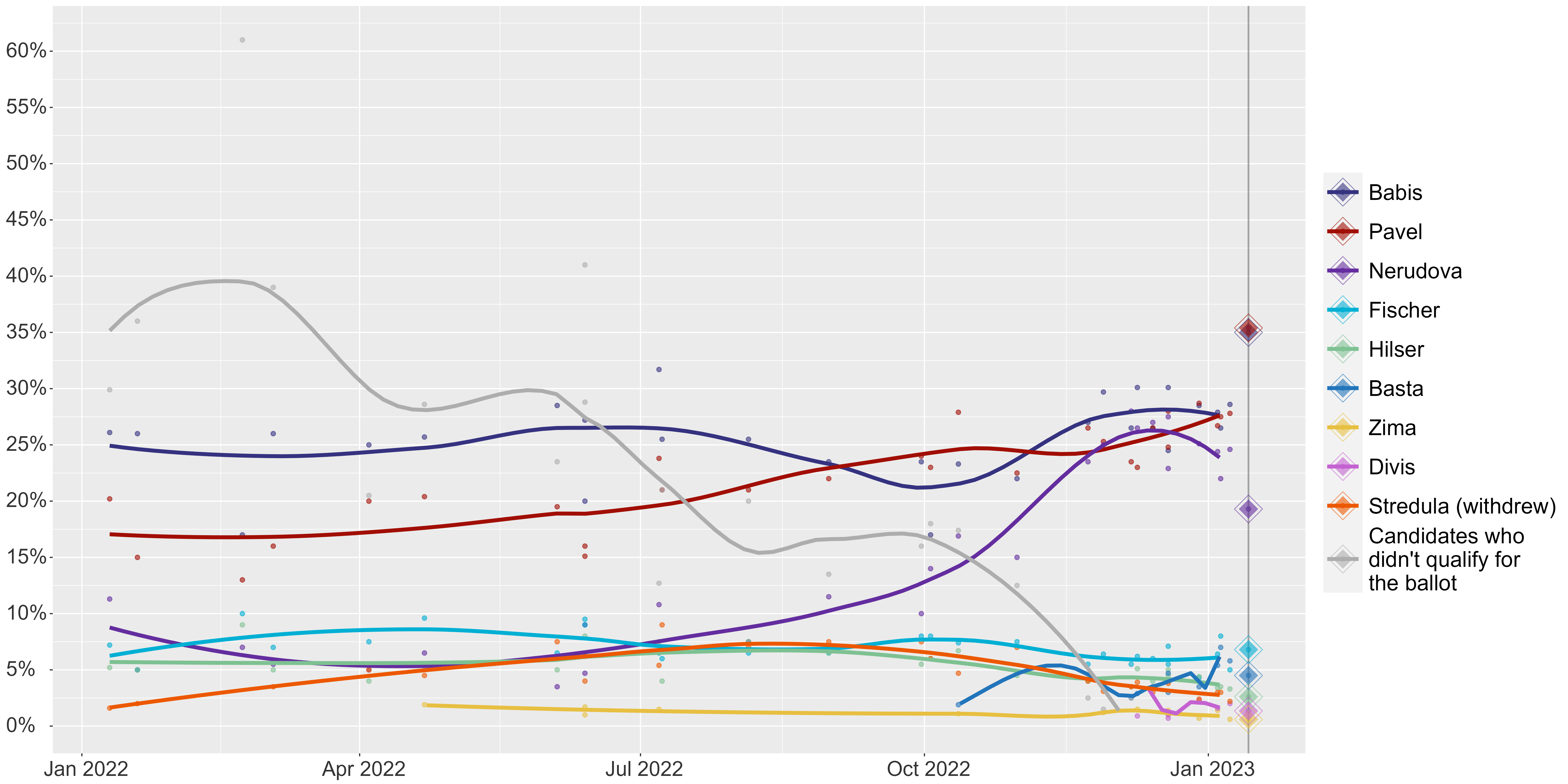
A LOESS graph displaying the polls for the first round of the 2023 Czech Presidential election

=== Second round ===
A local regression graph displaying the polls for the second round of the 2023 Czech Presidential election

== Predictions ==
=== First round ===
Published date	Pollster	Petr Pavel	Andrej Babiš	Danuše Nerudová	Pavel Fischer	Jaroslav Bašta	Marek Hilšer	Karel Diviš	Tomáš Zima
13 January 2023	Programy Do Voleb	26.97%	26.95%	24.60%	5.56%	4.46%	3.51%	1.51%	1.06%
12 January 2023	Fortuna	29.58%	28.35%	21.15%	8.47%	7.18%	2.85%	2.00%	0.42%

=== Second round ===
Published date	Pollster	Petr Pavel	Andrej Babiš
15 January 2023	STEM/MARK	54.73%	45.27%
12 January 2023	Fortuna	58.11%	41.89%

== Results ==
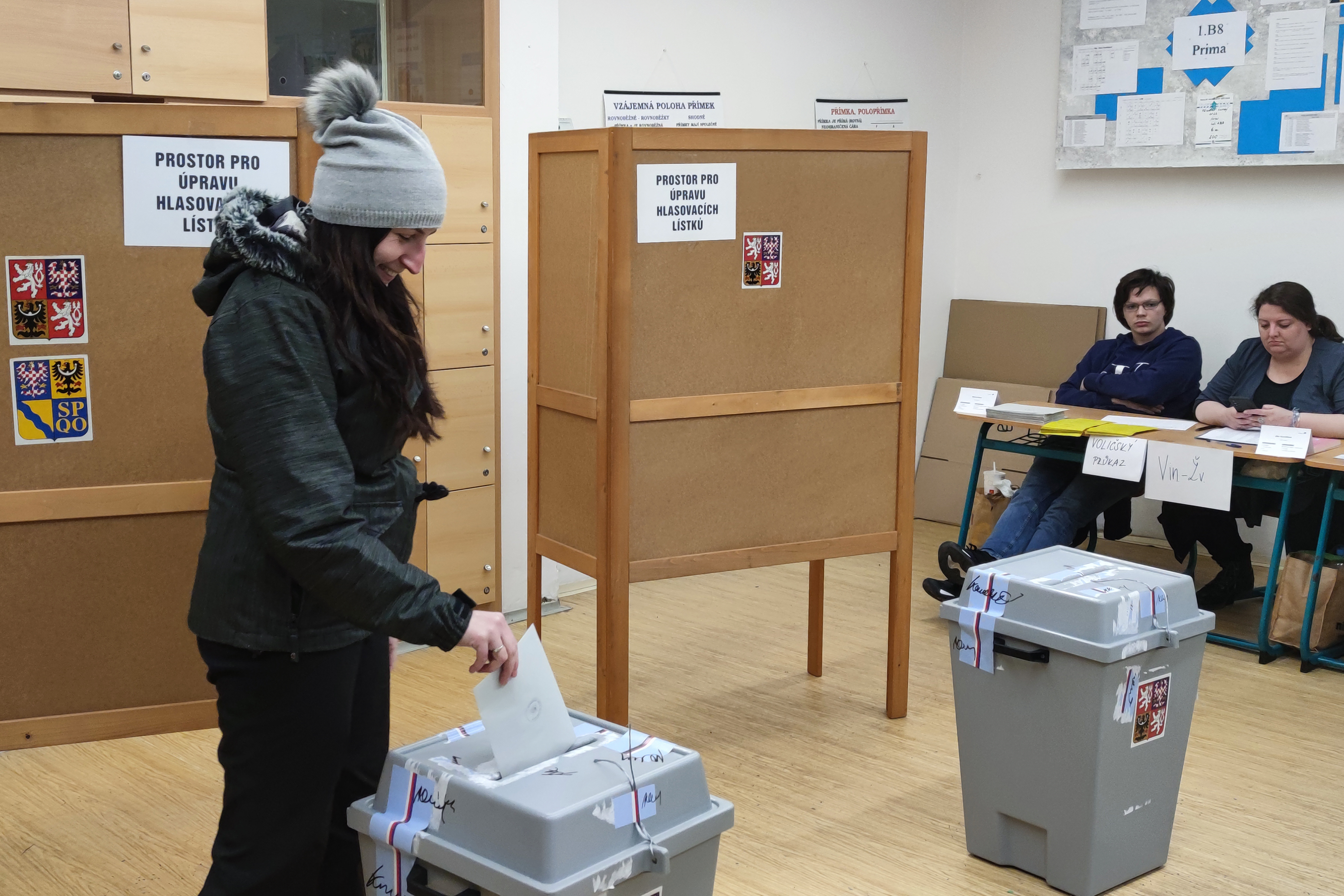
Voting in 2023 Czech presidential election, electoral district no. 70, Olomouc

The first round of the Czech presidential election took place on 13 and 14 January. Petr Pavel, former chair of the NATO Military Committee, ran as an independent with the endorsement of the governing alliance SPOLU. He won the first round with 35.4 per cent of the vote, while former prime minister Babiš running as the candidate of ANO 2011 finished second with 35 per cent. Pavel was subsequently endorsed by four of the eliminated candidates, while Bašta and Zima did not endorse either candidates. Pavel was also endorsed by the incumbent prime minister Petr Fiala, while Babiš received endorsements from the Communist Party, the Tricolour Movement, and outgoing president Zeman.

The runoff was held on 27 and 28 January. Pavel defeated Babiš with 58 per cent of the vote, and became the president-elect. He assumed office on 9 March, replacing Zeman.

On 29 January, an electoral district in Prague-Bohnice was reported to have accidentally submitted its reported tallies for Babiš and Pavel the wrong way round, resulting in about 100 votes being erroneously counted in favour of Babiš. However, the legal period during which electoral commissions can still correct the submitted results had already expired when the error was noticed, after which only the Supreme Administrative Court can order the correction of the official results.

Candidate	Party	First round		Second round	
Candidate	Party	Votes	%	Votes	%
Petr Pavel	Independent	1,975,056	35.40	3,359,151	58.33
Andrej Babiš	ANO	1,952,213	34.99	2,400,046	41.67
Danuše Nerudová	Independent	777,080	13.93		
Pavel Fischer	Independent	376,705	6.75		
Jaroslav Bašta	Freedom and Direct Democracy	248,375	4.45		
Marek Hilšer	Marek Hilšer to the Senate	142,912	2.56		
Karel Diviš	Independent	75,475	1.35		
Tomáš Zima	Independent	30,769	0.55		
Total		5,578,585	100.00	5,759,197	100.00
Valid votes		5,578,585	99.21	5,759,197	99.51
Invalid/blank votes		44,227	0.79	28,343	0.49
Total votes		5,622,812	100.00	5,787,540	100.00
Registered voters/turnout		8,245,962	68.19	8,242,566	70.22
Source: Czech Statistical Office

=== Results by region ===
==== First round ====
Region	Petr Pavel	Andrej Babiš	Danuše Nerudová	Pavel Fischer	Jaroslav Bašta	Marek Hilšer	Karel Diviš	Tomáš Zima
Prague	51.0	20.1	14.6	7.7	2.8	2.3	1.1	0.5
Central Bohemia	40.6	31.3	13.8	6.1	3.6	2.6	1.4	0.6
South Bohemia	33.5	34.9	15.0	7.4	4.3	2.8	1.4	0.6
Plzeň	34.5	37.4	13.0	5.8	4.8	2.6	1.4	0.6
Karlovy Vary	31.4	42.8	11.3	4.6	5.7	2.2	1.4	0.6
Ústí nad Labem	29.3	47.3	11.0	3.9	4.4	2.3	1.3	0.5
Liberec	35.6	34.4	13.9	6.2	5.0	2.7	1.7	0.6
Hradec Králové	36.3	33.3	14.6	6.5	4.5	2.8	1.5	0.6
Pardubice	33.6	34.6	15.5	6.7	4.7	2.9	1.4	0.6
Vysočina	31.5	35.5	15.1	8.6	4.3	3.0	1.4	0.6
South Moravia	34.0	33.9	15.4	7.8	4.8	2.4	1.2	0.5
Olomouc	29.7	39.6	13.8	6.7	5.6	2.6	1.5	0.5
Zlín	30.5	35.3	14.3	9.4	5.5	2.9	1.4	0.6
Moravia-Silesia	27.8	44.9	12.0	5.9	5.1	2.3	1.4	0.5
Europe	55.50	3.66	29.43	7.12	1.04	2.67	0.43	0.15
Americas	58.57	4.93	26.19	6.28	2.60	1.08	0.36	0.00
Asia	58.03	7.09	22.63	6.57	1.34	3.29	0.60	0.45
Africa	59.50	3.50	18.00	10.50	3.50	3.00	1.00	1.00
Australia and Oceania	53.42	5.14	29.11	5.48	4.45	1.71	0.34	0.34
Total	35.4	35.0	13.9	6.8	4.5	2.6	1.4	0.6
Source: Czech Statistical Office

==== Second round ====
Region	Petr Pavel	Andrej Babiš
Prague	76.37	23.63
Central Bohemia	63.34	36.66
South Bohemia	58.58	41.42
Plzeň	55.71	44.29
Karlovy Vary	49.01	50.99
Ústí nad Labem	45.53	54.47
Liberec	58.81	41.19
Hradec Králové	60.21	39.79
Pardubice	58.09	41.91
Vysočina	57.39	42.61
South Moravia	58.99	41.01
Olomouc	51.79	48.21
Zlín	56.54	43.46
Moravia-Silesia	46.93	53.07
Europe	95.64	4.36
Americas	94.02	5.98
Asia	93.41	6.59
Africa	94.26	5.74
Australia and Oceania	89.17	10.83
Total	58.32	41.68
Source: Czech Statistical Office

== Aftermath ==
Babiš conceded defeat in a speech at his headquarters, and congratulated Pavel, expressing hope that Pavel would be "everyone's president". Former Minister of Finance Alena Schillerová called Babiš's result a "historic result for ANO" which the party would try to replicate in the next parliamentary election. Prime Minister Petr Fiala also sent a congratulatory message, and criticised Babiš's campaign during the election, calling it "the most abhorrent in our new era" and hailed "the end of Babiš's era in our country". Outgoing president Miloš Zeman expressed surprise at the scale of Pavel's victory, and stated that Babiš "should not be written off prematurely". Pavel was also congratulated by Senate leader Miloš Vystrčil, Chamber of Deputies speaker Markéta Pekarová Adamová, and Deputy Prime Minister Marian Jurečka. Ivan Bartoš, the leader of the Czech Pirate Party, called upon Babiš to apologise for what he described as his "dishonest" campaign. On 3 February 2023 Karel Janeček submitted a complaint to the Supreme Administrative Court over the presidential election process.

=== International reactions ===
- European Union – EU Commission President Ursula von der Leyen congratulated Pavel on Twitter, stating that she "welcomed his strong commitment to European values".
- France – President Emmanuel Macron congratulated Pavel and invited him to Paris, stating that their countries were linked by common European values.
- Latvia – President Egils Levits congratulated Pavel and stated that he looked forward working closely together with Pavel, strengthening relations between the two countries and the EU and supporting Ukraine.
- Moldova – President Maia Sandu congratulated Pavel and stated that she looked forward to continuing constructive dialogue between the two countries.
- Poland – President Andrzej Duda congratulated Pavel and invited him to Warsaw, expressing a wish to maintain good Czech–Polish relations.
- Slovakia – President Zuzana Čaputová appeared at Pavel's hustings to congratulate him personally. She expressed her joy at the fact that there would be a new head of state in Europe who respected democratic values. She marked his victory as one of hope that decency and truthfulness is not a weakness, but a strength that can lead to victory, even in politics.
- Ukraine – President Volodymyr Zelenskyy congratulated Pavel on his decisive victory, expressing appreciation for Pavel's support for Ukraine against Russian aggression. He stated that he was looking forward to their cooperation.
- Germany – President Frank-Walter Steinmeier congratulated Pavel and stated that Germany and the Czech Republic work together for peace and security in Europe.
- Austria – President Alexander Van der Bellen wished Pavel best of success and stated that he was looking forward to close cooperation in the EU.
- United States – Secretary of State Antony Blinken congratulated Pavel and noted that the United States and the Czech Republic are friends, partners, and allies.
- Taiwan – President Tsai Ing-wen congratulated Pavel and noted that she looks forward to deepening Taiwan-Czech wide-ranging cooperation based on shared values of freedom, democracy & human rights.

== See also ==
- 2023 Czech presidential election debates
