= Karel Janeček =

Czech mathematician, entrepreneur, activist (born 1973)

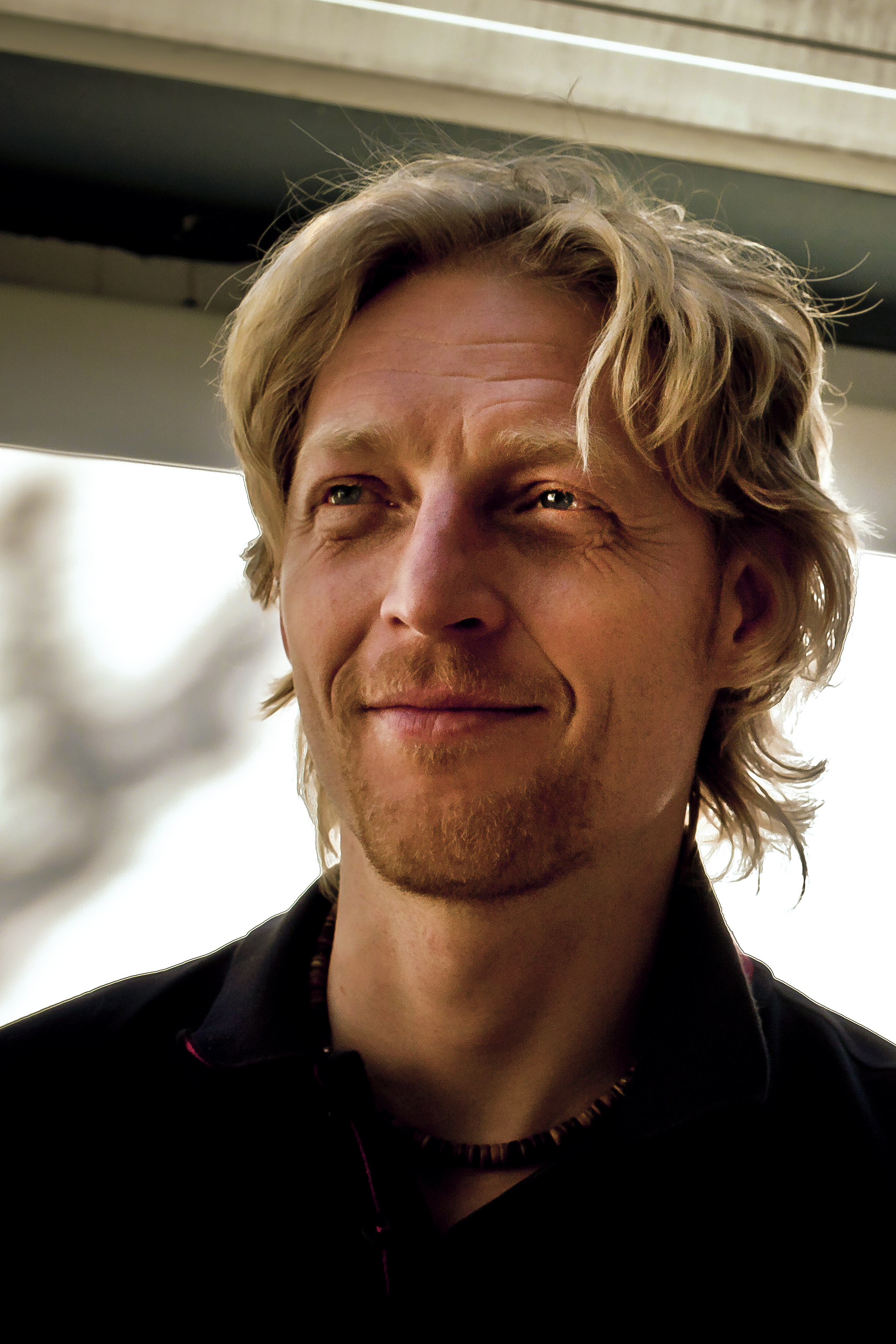
- Born: 26 July 1973 (age 53); Plzeň, Czechoslovakia
- Education: Charles University in Prague; Bradley University (MBA); Carnegie Mellon University (PhD)
- Occupations: Mathematician; entrepreneur; activist
- Organization(s): Karel Janeček Foundation; D21 - Janeček method
- Known for: anti-corruption campaign; philanthropy
- Spouse: Lilia Khousnoutdinova (m. 2021)
- Children: 5
- Scientific career
- Thesis: Futures Trading Model with Transaction Costs (2004)
- Doctoral advisor: Steven E. Shreve
- Website: kareljanecek.com

Karel Janeček (born 26 July 1973) is a Czech mathematician, entrepreneur and philanthropist. He co-founded the financial company RSJ for algorithmic trading. He later became active in anti-corruption initiatives, philanthropy and electoral reform.

In 2011, Janeček co-founded the Anti-Corruption Endowment (Nadační fond proti korupci, NFPK), which supported whistleblowers and projects exposing corruption in public administration. He also developed the D21 – Janeček method, an alternative voting system.

== Early life and education ==
Janeček was born in Plzeň. He graduated from the Faculty of Mathematics and Physics of Charles University in Prague in the field of probability and mathematical statistics. He is an MBA in finance graduate of Bradley University, Peoria, Illinois, US, and a PhD graduate in the field of mathematical finance of Carnegie Mellon University in Pittsburgh, Pennsylvania, US.

== Academia ==
From 2007 to 2013, Janeček lectured at the Faculty of Mathematics and Physics of Charles University in Prague. He specializes in optimal control in mathematical finance.

Janeček has authored and co-authored several research articles in scientific journals in the area of applied stochastic calculus, where his work has numerous citations, such as "Optimal investment with high-watermark performance fee," SIAM Journal on Control and Optimization, 2012; "Futures trading with transaction costs," Illinois Journal of Mathematics, 2010; "Asymptotic analysis for optimal investment and consumption with transaction costs," Finance and Stochastics, 2004; and others.

== Business ==
From 1998 to 2000, Janeček worked as a mathematical analyst for the hedge fund Market Research Ltd. He founded the financial company RSJ, which became known for algorithmic trading on international derivatives markets. RSJ's core trading activity is market making, using automated trading systems to provide liquidity by continuously placing buy and sell orders. The company focuses primarily on futures contracts and has traded on major exchanges in Europe, the United States and Asia.

RSJ's algorithmic trading became the main source of Janeček's wealth. He was for many years one of the company's largest shareholders but gradually reduced his involvement. In 2016, after having already left the company's management, he reduced his stake from 40% to 25%.

== Anti-corruption campaign ==
In 2011, Janeček co-founded the Anti-Corruption Endowment (Nadační fond proti korupci, NFPK) with businessman Stanislav Bernard and actor Jan Kraus. Janeček became chairman of the fund, which supported whistleblowers and projects aimed at exposing corruption in public administration.

After President Václav Klaus announced a controversial amnesty in January 2013, Janeček financed a campaign calling for Klaus to be held accountable. A related petition gathered about 74,000 signatures, while 28 senators supported bringing a constitutional charge against Klaus. The Senate later approved the charge and submitted it to the Constitutional Court. The court discontinued the proceedings later that month without ruling on the merits, because Klaus's presidential term had already ended.

== Political reform ==
In 2013, Janeček introduced the D21 – Janeček method, an electoral method in which voters can cast multiple positive votes and, in some versions, a negative vote. Janeček developed the system as an alternative intended to encourage broader consensus and reduce political polarization.

The method has mainly been used in participatory budgeting and other civic decision-making projects in the Czech Republic and abroad. Research has examined its effects on voter participation and electoral outcomes, although it has not been adopted for national parliamentary elections.

== Philanthropy ==
In 2010, Janeček established a fund to support scientific research in the Czech Republic. In 2013, it became the Neuron Fund for Support of Science after additional private donors joined the initiative. The fund awards grants and prizes to Czech scientists and promotes private support for scientific research.

In November 2021, Neuron's scientific and governing boards ended their cooperation with Janeček after he criticized COVID-19 restrictions and the vaccination of children during the Český slavík awards. The fund said that some of his statements contradicted scientific evidence and distanced itself from his views.

== Gambling ==
SBA floppy disk

While studying in the United States in the 1990s, Janeček became interested in blackjack and card counting and played blackjack semi-professionally in American casinos. In 1995, he developed the Statistical Blackjack Analyzer (SBA), software for simulating blackjack strategies and analysing their expected returns and risk.

SBA was subsequently used by Don Schlesinger for simulations published in his book Blackjack Attack, and specialist publications described SBA as one of the more advanced blackjack simulators of its period. Janeček also carried out mathematical analysis for Blackjack Switch.

Janeček also wrote about mathematical approaches to blackjack wagering and risk. His article “Optimal Wagering and Betting”, published in Blackjack Review in 1998, examined methods for determining optimal betting strategies using simulations generated by SBA. He also contributed analyses and participated in technical discussions on Stanford Wong's BJ21 blackjack community.

== Presidential bid ==
On 21 January 2022, Janeček announced that he would be running in the 2023 Czech presidential election. He submitted 73,000 signatures, but this total was reduced following sample analysis to 48,000 (later the court labeled some of them as valid but he still failed to meet the criteria by 80 signatures), below the requirement. Janeček submitted a complaint to the Supreme Administrative Court. His complaint was rejected by the court on 13 December 2022.

Janeček subsequently endorsed Petr Pavel in both rounds. On 3 February 2023 he submitted a complaint to the Supreme Administrative Court over the presidential election process. The Supreme Administrative Court rejected the challenge on 14 February 2023. The Constitutional Court rejected his subsequent complaint in May.

== Personal life ==
Janeček has two daughters from his first marriage to Michaela, and a son from his second marriage to Mariem. Since May 2017, he has been in a relationship with Lilia Khousnoutdinova, and they have a daughter and a son. They got married first in a Buddhist wedding ceremony in Bhutan in 2017 and officially on 21 December 2021 in Prague. He is a Buddhists.

== See also ==
- Kelly criterion
- Edward O. Thorp
- Claude Shannon
- Black–Scholes model
