= Pavel Fischer =

Czech politician and diplomat

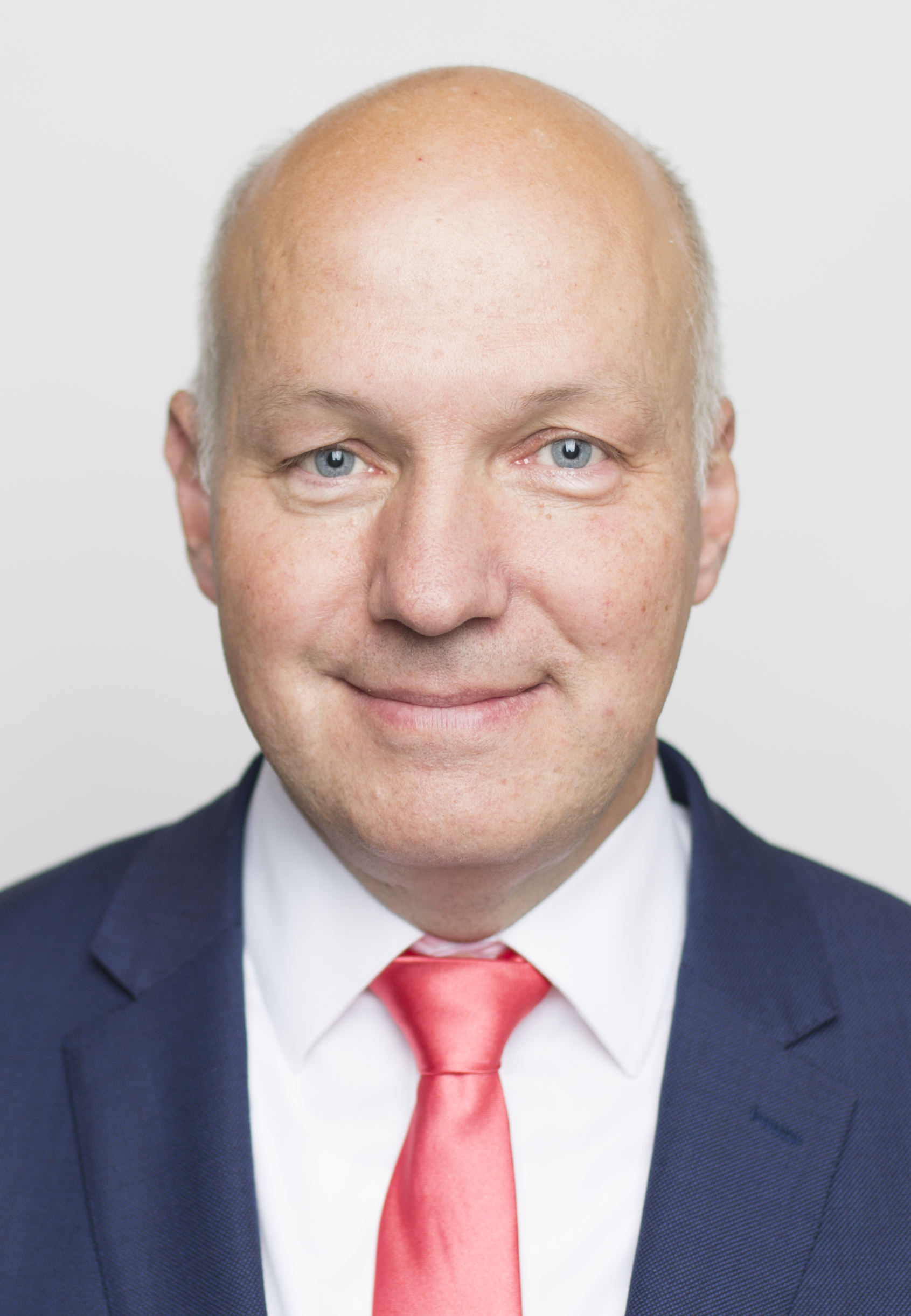

Senator from Prague 12
- Incumbent
- Assumed office 13 October 2018
- Preceded by: Tomáš Grulich

Czech Ambassador to France
- In office 2003–2010
- President: Václav Havel; Václav Klaus
- Preceded by: Petr Janyška
- Succeeded by: Marie Chatardová

Personal details
- Born: 26 August 1965 (age 61) Prague, Czechoslovakia (now Czech Republic)
- Party: Independent
- Spouse: Klára Fischerová
- Children: 4 children
- Education: ENA, Charles University in Prague
- Website: Official website

Pavel Fischer (born 26 August 1965) is a Czech politician and diplomat who has been Senator from Prague 12 since 2018. Fischer previously served as Czech Ambassador to France from 2003 to 2010. He was a presidential candidate in 2018, when he finished third with 10.23% of the vote, and in 2023, when he finished fourth with 6.75% of the vote. He was elected to the Czech Senate in 2018.

== Early life and career ==
Fischer grew up in Prague and graduated in French and Czech languages at Charles University. He was the Czech Ambassador to France from 2003-2010, and has also served as head of the Department of Politics in the office of the Czech president Václav Havel, and director of STEM, a non-profit institute in Prague focused on empirical sociological research and social analysis.

== Political career ==
On October 5, 2017 he announced his candidacy for President of the Czech Republic in the 2018 election. He received the nomination of 17 senators from Christian and Democratic Union – Czechoslovak People's Party, Social Democrats, TOP 09 and Mayors and Independents. He stepped down as a director of STEM to focus on his candidacy. In the first round of the election, Fischer finished in third place with 10.23% of the vote. He endorsed Jiří Drahoš for the second round.

In October 2018 he was elected to the Czech Senate, endorsed by the Civic Democratic Party, Christian Democrats, TOP 09, Mayors and Independents, Conservative Party, Monarchist Party, and Club of Committed Non-Party Members. As a Senator, Fischer sits as an independent, and is the chair of the Committee on Foreign Affairs, Defence and Security, and a member of the Standing Senate Commission on Rural Development and the Permanent Delegation of the Parliament of the Czech Republic to the Interparliamentary Union.

Following his election to the Senate he announced his intention to run in the 2023 Czech presidential election. He was one of three candidates endorsed by Spolu (Civic Democratic Party, KDU-ČSL and TOP 09). He finished fourth of eight candidates in the first round on 14 January 2023, with 6.75% of the vote, and subsequently endorsed Petr Pavel for the second round.

=== Political views ===
Fischer is considered a conservative politician who supports the liberal concept of the state and traditional family values.

Fischer supports closer integration of the Czech Republic with the European Union, orientation to the West and the strengthening of the bond between Europe and the United States. He stated his intention to play a unifying role in domestic politics, specifically between the government, parliament and society. He stated that Emmanuel Macron would be the preferred choice for the Czech Republic in the 2017 French presidential election.

Fischer drew controversy on 16 December 2017 when he stated that he would not appoint a homosexual judge to the Constitutional Court, on the grounds that their rulings on issues pertaining to LGBT rights may constitute a conflict of interest. He subsequently apologised for this statement.

During the 2023 presidential election campaign, Fischer expressed his support for the right to keep and bear arms, stating that he "considers it correct for adult citizens to have the basic ability to handle firearms, to know how to make them safe or check that they are unloaded". Fischer further said that as president, he would veto restrictions on the legal possession of firearms by civilians.

== Personal life ==
Fischer is a Roman Catholic. He and his wife Klára had four children, but their oldest son Vojtěch, who was severely disabled, died in 2013.
