= Danuše Nerudová =

Czech economist

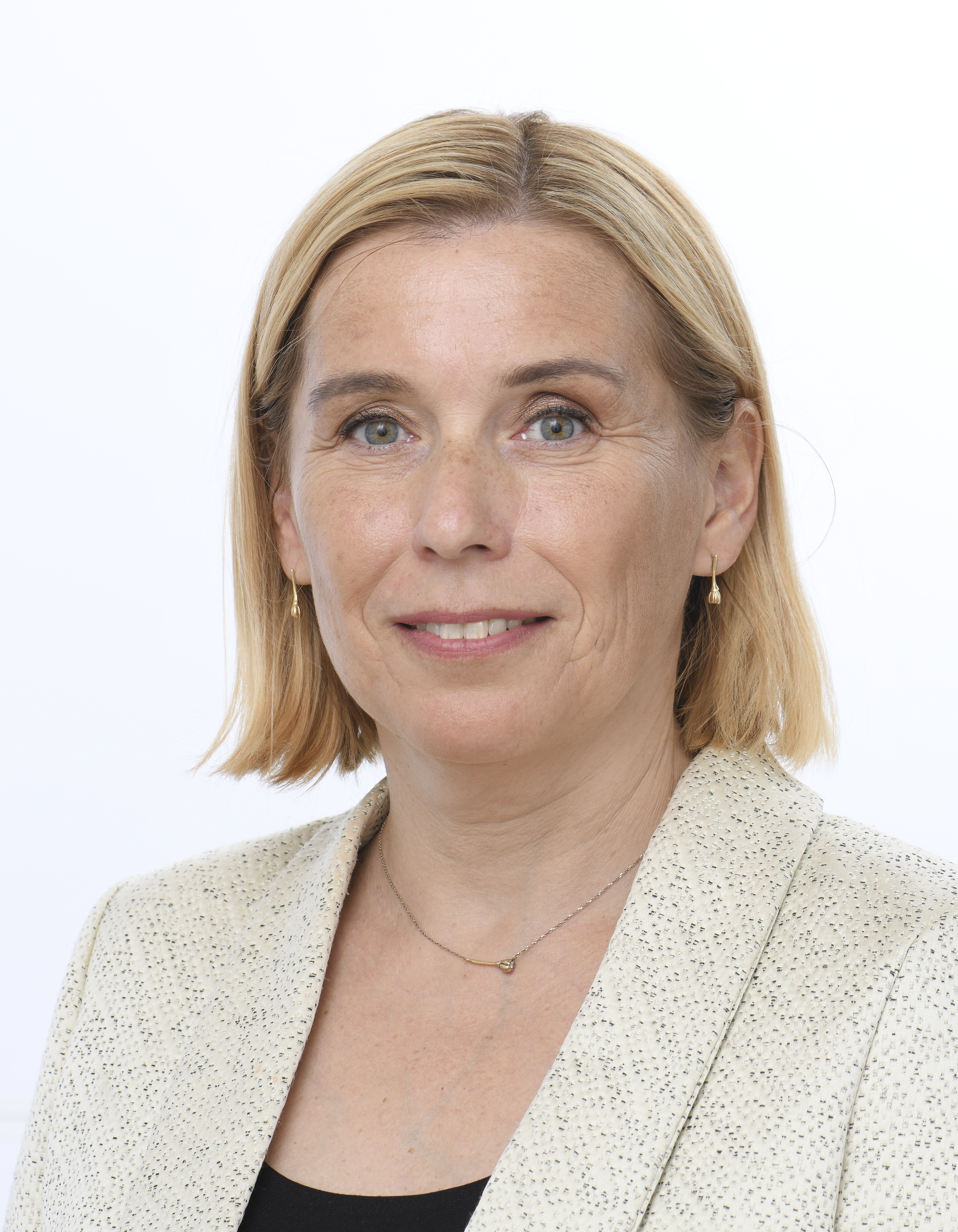
- Official portrait, 2024

Member of the European Parliament for Czech Republic
- Incumbent
- Assumed office 16 July 2024

39th Rector of Mendel University in Brno
- In office 1 February 2018 – 31 January 2022
- Preceded by: Ladislav Havel
- Succeeded by: Jan Mareš

Personal details
- Born: Danuše Peslarová; 4 January 1979 (age 47) Brno, Czechoslovakia
- Party: STAN (2024–present)
- Other political affiliations: Independent (until 2024)
- Spouse: Robert Neruda (m. 2002)
- Children: 2
- Education: Mendel University in Brno
- Website: www.danusenerudova.cz

Danuše Nerudová (née Peslarová; born 4 January 1979) is a Czech economist and university professor. She has been a Member of the European Parliament since June 2024, representing the Mayors and Independents. She was formerly the chair of the Commission for Fair Pensions and rector of Mendel University in Brno, both from 2018 to 2022. She was a candidate in the 2023 Czech presidential election, finishing in third place in the first round.

== Early life and education ==
Nerudová was born in Brno in 1979 and lives with her family in Kuřim. She received her primary and secondary education at elementary and kindergarten in Brno's Svornosti Square and at Gymnázium třída Kapitána Jaroše. Nerudová studied economic policy and administration at the Faculty of Operational Economics at Mendel University, completing her master's degree in 2002 and doctoral degree in 2005.

== Academic career ==
From September 2007, Nerudová was the head of the Institute of Accounting and Taxation at Mendel University's Faculty of Business and Economics. She was also vice-dean of the faculty from 2009 to 2014, and was also briefly vice-rector of the university (2014–2015), the youngest holder of both of these positions in the university's history. Her research focuses on tax policy and the harmonization of taxes within the European Union, as well as economic inequality between men and women, and the long-term sustainable financing of pension systems.

In 2017, Nerudová became a professor in the field of economics at the Prague University of Economics and Business. On 1 February 2018, she was appointed by President Miloš Zeman as the 39th Rector of Mendel University, until 31 January 2022.

== Political career ==
On 31 May 2022, Nerudová announced her intention to run for President of the Czech Republic in the 2023 election. She was one of three candidates supported by the Spolu political alliance. She finished third of eight candidates in the first round on 14 January 2023, with 13.93% of the vote, and subsequently endorsed Petr Pavel for the second round.

On 15 June 2023 Nerudová expressed interest in running in the 2024 European Parliament elections, but did not specify for which party. On 17 August, it was reported that she would be the lead candidate on the Mayors and Independents electoral list. In June 2024, Mayors and Independents finished fifth in the election with 8.7% of the vote and two seats, one of which went to Nerudová. She has also expressed interest in becoming the next Czech European commissioner.

== Personal life ==
She has been married since 2002 to lawyer Robert Neruda, with whom she has two sons named Filip and Daniel.
