= Josef Středula =

Czech trade union activist

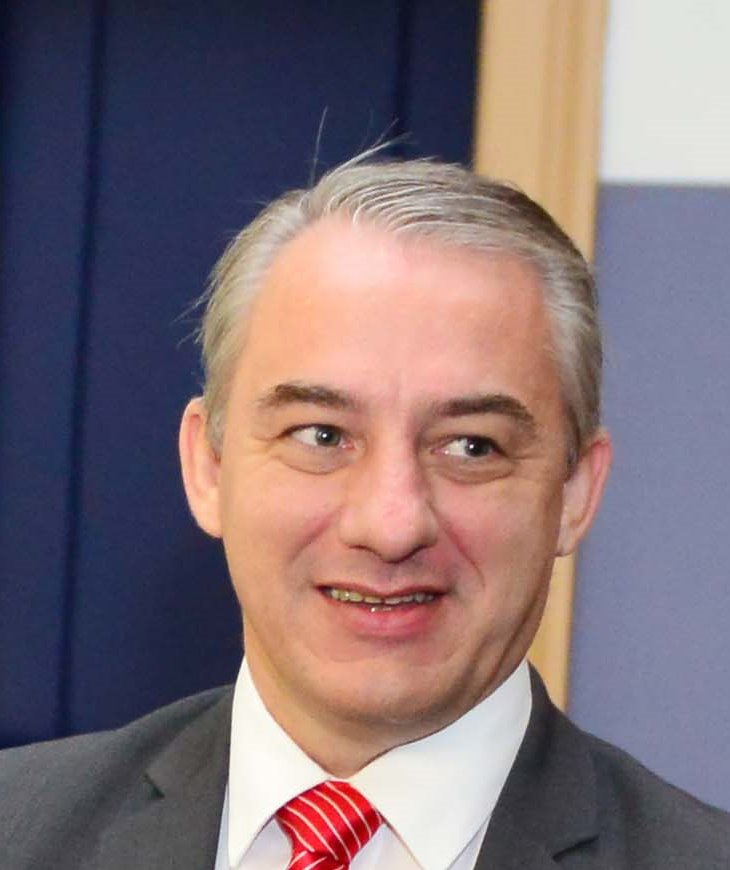

Chairman of the Czech-Moravian Confederation of Trade Unions
- In office 25 April 2014 – 4 March 2024
- Preceded by: Jaroslav Zavadil
- Succeeded by: Himself
- Incumbent
- Assumed office 25 March 2024
- Preceded by: Himself

Personal details
- Born: 12 November 1967 (age 58) Opava, Czechoslovakia (now Czech Republic)

Josef Středula (born 12 November 1967) is a Czech trade union activist. He became the chairman of the KOVO trade union in 2005. He left the office in 2014 to become the chairman of the Czech-Moravian Confederation of Trade Unions.

== Early life and career ==
Středula was born in Opava in 1967. He studied at Technical High School and then worked at Vítkovice Ironworks. He has been a trade unionist since 1993. Středula affiliated himself with the KOVO Trade Union, and was elected chairman of the union in 2005. He left the office when he was elected chairman of the Czech-Moravian Confederation of Trade Unions (ČMKOS). He was reelected in 2018.

== 2023 Presidential candidacy ==
He was asked about his possible presidential candidacy by A2larm magazine. He said it was possible he could run in the next Czech presidential election if he had the support of trade unions. His statement was positively received by trade unionists. Some politicians from the Czech Social Democratic Party (ČSSD) and Communist Party of Bohemia and Moravia, including Jan Hamáček and Jiří Dolejš, suggested possible support for Středula.

On 1 May 2022, the ČSSD youth organization, the Young Social Democrats, began collecting signatures for his candidacy. Four days later, he accepted the candidacy and announced it on his Twitter account, reiterating that he wanted to be a civic candidate. ČSSD has endorsed his candidacy.

Josef Středula was criticized by Czech journalist Lukáš Valenta over his use of a trade union demonstration as part of his campaign. Valenta also criticized Středula for his description of Ukraine as "the most corrupt country in the world". On 8 January 2023, Středula withdrew from the election and endorsed Danuše Nerudová.

== Later career ==
On 4 March 2024, Středula was dismissed as chairman of ČMKOS due to unpaid union membership fees. On 25 March 2024, Středula was reelected unopposed as chairman of ČMKOS, with 64 votes of 112. On 24 April 2026, Středula was reelected as chairman of ČMKOS, with 90 votes of 176.
