= Endorsements in the 2018 Czech presidential election =

This is a list of notable individuals and organizations who voiced their endorsement for the office of the Czech president, including those who subsequently retracted or withheld their endorsement, of any candidate during 2018 Czech presidential election.

== Jiří Drahoš ==
=== Political ===
- Pavel Bělobrádek, leader of Christian and Democratic Union – Czechoslovak People's Party.
- John Bok, political activist.
- Dominik Feri, MP.
- Petr Gazdík, leader of Mayors and Independents.
- Jan Horník, Senator and member of Mayors and Independents.
- Ludvík Hovorka, Christian and Democratic Union – Czechoslovak People's Party member and MP.
- Miroslav Kalousek, leader of TOP 09 endorsed Drahoš in May 2017. He later endorsed Topolánek.
- Josef Kott, member of ANO 2011.
- Helena Langšádlová, MP and member of TOP 09.
- Jiří Pospíšil, leader of TOP 09. He called Drahoš the best possible candidate.

Parties

- Christian and Democratic Union – Czechoslovak People's Party (KDU-ČSL) were originally rumoured to be considering endorsing Michal Horáček, but eventually endorsed Drahoš.
- Mayors and Independents (STAN) endorsed Drahoš on 31 October 2017.
- Young Social Democrats, Youth wing of ČSSD held voting about presidential candidates.

=== Non-political ===
- Soňa Červená, singer.
- Tomáš Hanák, actor.
- Jan Hrušínský, actor. He endorsed Drahoš in early 2017 and participated in his campaign.
- Tomáš Mašín, director.
- Dana Morávková, actress.
- Olga Sommerová, director.
- Zdeněk Svěrák humorist

== Pavel Fischer ==
=== Political ===
- Karel Schwarzenberg, former leader of TOP 09.

=== Non-political ===
- Dagmar Havlová, actress, former First Lady
- David Koller, singer.
- Oldřich Navrátil, actor.
- Jan Unger, singer.

== Petr Hannig ==
=== Political ===
- Tomáš Homola, SPR–RSČ politician.

Parties

- Democratic Green Party (DSZ)
- National Democracy (ND), a far right party.
- Party of Common Sense (Rozumní), of which Hannig is leader.
- Several minor parties, including the Republican Party of Bohemia Moravia and Silesia, Change for People, the Conservative and Social Movement, and the Czech Movement for National Unity.

== Marek Hilšer ==
=== Non-political ===
- Adam Halaš, director.
- Jiří Hönig, surgeon.
- Marek Vácha, university professor.

== Michal Horáček ==
=== Political ===
- Marian Jurečka, Christian and Democratic Union – Czechoslovak People's Party MP. He endorsed Horáček in 2016.
- Magda Vašáryová, actress, diplomat and politician.

=== Non-political ===
- Ondřej Brzobohatý, musician.
- Marta Kubišová, singer.
- Pavel Nový, actor.
- Josef Váňa, steeplechase jockey, horse breeder and trainer.
- Zdeněk Svěrák, writer and actor.

== Jiří Hynek ==
=== Political ===
Parties

- Realists (REAL)

== Vratislav Kulhánek ==
=== Political ===
Parties

- Civic Democratic Alliance (ODA), a minor centre-right party. Kulhánek was the party's official candidate.

== Mirek Topolánek ==
=== Political ===
- Rudolf Baránek, Freeholder Party of the Czech Republic politician.
- Marek Benda, Civic Democratic Party MP.
- Daniela Filipiová, Civic Democratic Party Senator. She called Topolánek the absolutely best candidate.
- Miroslav Kalousek, former leader of TOP 09. He endorsed his candidacy on 5 November 2017.
- Daniela Kovářová, lawyer, writer and former Minister of Justice.
- Václav Klaus, former President. He endorsed Topolánek on 6 November 2017.
- Jaroslav Kubera, Mayor of Teplice and Senator. When he decided to not run he called Topolánek his surrogate.
- Martin Kupka, MP and Deputy Chairman of the Civic Democratic Party.
- Ivan Langer, lawyer and former ODS politician.
- Zdeněk Nytra, Civic Democratic Party Senator.
- Tomáš Pajonk, leader of the Party of Free Citizens.
- Zdeněk Schwarz, Civic Democratic Party politician and former senator.
- Alexander Tomský, Realists politician.
- Jan Zahradil MEP.
- Ivo Valenta, Freeholder Party of the Czech Republic Senator and businessman.

Parties

- Civic Conservative Party, a minor right wing party. It endorsed Topolánek's candidacy on 4 November 2017 via its Facebook page when speculation about his candidacy started.
- The Civic Democratic Party (ODS), the main right-wing party. ODS endorsed Topolánek on 6 November 2017. ODS had been expected to nominate its own candidate, because leader Petr Fiala stated that the party would probably not support Zeman, Drahoš or Horáček. Jaroslav Kubera was also discussed as a potential candidate.
- The Freeholder Party of the Czech Republic (SSČR), minor right wing party, endorsed Topolánek on 8 December 2017.
- Young Conservatives, Youth wing of ODS endorsed Topolánek on 3 December 2017.

=== Non-political ===
- Martin Dejdar, actor.
- Jiří X. Doležal, journalist.
- Karolína Plíšková, professional tennis player.
- Pavel Nečas, actor.
- Pavel Šporcl, violin player.

== Miloš Zeman ==
=== Political ===
- Vojtěch Adam, Communist Party of Bohemia and Moravia MP.
- Marie Benešová, Czech Social Democratic Party MP.
- Milan Chovanec, acting leader of Czech Social Democratic Party. He endorsed Zeman in March 2017.
- Jaroslav Doubrava, Senator and member of Czech Social Democratic Party.
- Jaroslav Faltýnek, Deputy Chairman of ANO 2011. He endorsed Zeman on 26 October 2017.
- Radim Fiala, Freedom and Direct Democracy Deputy Chairman and MP.
- Jaroslav Foldyna, MP and member of Czech Social Democratic Party.
- Václav Homolka, Senator of Communist Party of Bohemia and Moravia.
- Miloš Jakeš, retired Czech communist politician and former General Secretary of the Communist Party of Czechoslovakia.
- Vítězslav Jandák, Czech Social Democratic Party MP.
- František Ringo Čech, painter, actor, election leader of Party of Civic Rights in 2017
- Jana Lorencová, ANO 2011 MP.
- Miroslav Nenutil, Senator and member of Czech Social Democratic Party.
- Josef Vondrášek, MP and member of Communist Party of Bohemia and Moravia.
- Jaroslav Zeman, senator and member of Civic Democratic Party. He endorsed Zeman in March 2017.
- Jiří Zimola, member of Czech Social Democratic Party.

Parties

- Děčín Czech Social Democratic Party (ČSSD). The Děčín branch of the party endorsed Zeman on 28 November 2017 and called on the party's national leadership to do the same.
- Freedom and Direct Democracy (SPD), the fourth largest parliamentary party, endorsed Zeman on 9 December 2017, following a party conference attended by Zeman.
- The Party of Civic Rights (SPO) confirmed its support for Zeman on 29 December 2017.
- Communist Party of Bohemia and Moravia (KSČM)

=== Non-political ===
- Ondřej Hejma, singer.
- Jiří Kajínek, high-profile double murderer. He announced he would vote for Zeman after he received a presidential pardon.
- Jan Kuželka, actor.
- Zdeněk Troška, director.
- Helena Vondráčková, singer.
- Ivan Vyskočil, actor.

== Parties endorsing no candidate ==
- Czech Social Democratic Party (ČSSD) said it would hold a presidential primary in November 2017 to choose their candidate, but did not organise one. After initial speculation that the party may endorse Zeman, ČSSD leader Bohuslav Sobotka announced that they were unlikely to do so due to Zeman's actions during the Czech government crisis in May 2017. It was reported that ČSSD planned to nominate Lubomír Zaorálek, who decided to not run, and eventually ČSSD decided to not support any candidate. This decision caused conflict within the party; the Děčín branch of ČSSD endorsed Zeman on 28 November 2017, while Young Social Democrats, the party's youth wing, endorsed Drahoš. On 4 January 2018, some members of the party founded a political platform called "Let's Save ČSSD", which endorsed Miloš Zeman.
- The Party of Free Citizens (Svobodní) did not endorse any candidate, but published a post on Twitter when Mirek Topolánek announced his candidacy, saying that they would be watching his candidacy. Party leader Pajonk stated that he believed the party should choose a candidate to endorse. On 9 December 2017, Svobodní started talks with Topolánek, Hynek and Hannig to negotiate their support. The party eventually failed to reach a consensus on one candidate and did not endorse any. Party leader Pajonk endorsed Mirek Topolánek.
- TOP 09 decided not to endorse any candidate. Prominent members of TOP 09 welcomed Drahoš's decision to run. Former leader Karel Schwarzenberg endorsed Fischer, while Miroslav Kalousek spoke positively about Mirek Topolánek's candidacy.
- The Green Party published its strategy for the presidential election on 1 June 2016. The party is opposed to incumbent president Miloš Zeman, and planned a common candidate of centre-left parties in cooperation with ČSSD, the Pirate Party and KDU-ČSL. The party does not have the resources to nominate its own candidate.
- The Moravians party submitted questions to all nine candidates about particular problems relating to Moravian citizens.
- The Communist Party announced on 9 September 2017 that they would support a candidate who would respect the party and agree to their conditions.
- The Czech Pirate Party announced on 25 October 2017 that they would not stand their own candidate or support any other candidate. However, the party did launch a survey to determine which candidate had the most support among its members. Marek Hilšer led the poll.
- ANO 2011 originally planned to hold a presidential primary, but decided against it following the 2017 legislative election. Various commentators had speculated that the party would endorse ANO minister Martin Stropnický, or incumbent president Zeman, but on 6 December 2017, Andrej Babiš announced that ANO 2011 would not endorse any presidential candidate. Babiš later announced that ANO would in fact endorse a candidate, and would reveal their endorsement on 11 January 2018. On 11 January 2018, Babiš announced his support for Zeman.

== Second round ==
=== Jiří Drahoš ===
==== Political ====
- Pavel Fischer, 2018 presidential candidate.
- Marek Hilšer, 2018 presidential candidate.
- Michal Horáček, 2018 presidential candidate.
- Vratislav Kulhánek, 2018 presidential candidate.
- Mirek Topolánek, 2018 presidential candidate.
- Ivan Bartoš, leader of the Czech Pirate Party
- Josef Káles, member of the city council of Chrudim and the Party of Free Citizens.
- Pavel Mises, member of the republican committee of the Party of Free Citizens.
- Josefa Knota, vice president of the TOP 09 in the South Bohemian Region.
- Karel Vodička, representative of the ČSSD in exile
- Martina Dlabajová, Member of the European Parliament for ANO 2011
- Dita Charanzová, Member of the European Parliament for ANO 2011 (but independent)
- Petr Ježek, Member of the European Parliament for ANO 2011
- Tomáš Macura, Major of Ostrava
- Jiří Štěpán, Governor of the Hradec Králové Region
- Bohuslav Sobotka, former Prime Minister
- Martin Netolický, Governor of the Pardubice Region
- Josef Bernard, Governor of the Plzeň Region
- Karel Schwarzenberg, former leader of TOP 09.

Parties

- TOP 09
- Civic Democratic Party (ODS)
- Green Party (Z)
- Christian and Democratic Union – Czechoslovak People's Party (KDU–ČSL)
- Young Social Democrats (MSD), Youth wing of ČSSD
- Mayors and Independents (STAN)
- Liberal-Environmental Party (LES)
- Freeholder Party of the Czech Republic (SsČR)
- Club of Committed Non-Party Members (KLAN)
- Mayors for Liberec Region (SLK)
- Senator 21 (SEN 21)
- Civic Democratic Alliance (ODA)
- Czech Pirate Party (Piráti)

=== Miloš Zeman ===
==== Political ====
- Petr Hannig, 2018 presidential candidate.
- Jiří Hynek, 2018 presidential candidate.
- Miroslav Kavij, leader of the Communist Party of Bohemia and Moravia of Plzeň.
- Jan Klán, leader of the Communist Party of Bohemia and Moravia of Kutná Hora.
- Andrej Babiš, Prime Minister of the Czech Republic
- Milan Chovanec, Leader of the ČSSD
- Jiří Zimola, former Governor of South Bohemian Region and former Member of the Chamber of Deputies for ČSSD
- Michal Hašek, former Governor of South Moravian Region and former Member of the Chamber of Deputies for ČSSD
- Miroslav Sládek, Leader of the SPR–RSČ and former Member of the Chamber of Deputies for SPR–RSČ
- Jiří Paroubek, former Prime Minister
- Václav Klaus, former President and Prime Minister.

Parties

- Freedom and Direct Democracy (SPD)
- Party of Civic Rights (SPOZ)
- Workers' Party of Social Justice (DSSS)
- No To Brussels - National Democracy (ND)
- Communist Party of Bohemia and Moravia (KSČM)
- Coalition for Republic – Republican Party of Czechoslovakia (SPR–RSČ)
- Realists (REAL)
- Democratic Green Party (DSZ)
- Czech Sovereignty (ČS)
- Independence Party of the Czech Republic (SNČR)
