= 2018 Czech Social Democratic Party government referendum =

Czech Social Democratic Party government referendum, 2018
- 21 May 2018 – 14 June 2018
- Should ČSSD join minority cabinet with ANO 2011 under the conditions stated in "Coalition Agreement of ANO 2011 and ČSSD" and the "Government manifesto"?
- Voting system: majority rule

Results
Choice	Votes	%
Yes	6,675	59.29%
No	4,584	40.71%
Valid votes	11,259	98.73%
Invalid or blank votes	145	1.27%
Total votes	11,404	100.00%
Registered voters/turnout	17,614	64.74%

From 21 May 2018 to 14 June 2018 the Czech Social Democratic Party (ČSSD) held a referendum to determine whether it should join the minority government of Andrej Babiš with potential confidence and supply from the Communist Party.

17,683 party members were eligible to vote and the referendum was deemed to be valid if the turnout reached at least 25%. A decision not to join the government would possibly trigger a snap election.

== Background ==
ČSSD won the 2013 legislative election with 20% of the vote and formed a coalition government with ANO 2011 and Christian and Democratic Union – Czechoslovak People's Party. Support for ČSSD fell during its time in government. The party suffered heavy losses in the 2017 election and finished in sixth place with 7% of the vote. In a subsequent leadership election, the main issue was whether ČSSD should join the new coalition government or be in opposition. Milan Chovanec argued that the party should be in opposition, while Jan Hamáček and Jiří Zimola supported joining the coalition. Chovanec was eliminated in the first round of voting. Hamáček then defeated Zimola and became the new leader, and started negotiations with ANO 2011. Zimola became deputy leader. The new cabinet of ANO 2011 and ČSSD would be supported by the Communist Party.

Former Prime Minister Bohuslav Sobotka expressed his opposition to joining the coalition, saying that the previous coalition with ANO damaged ČSSD. He also expressed the view that, as ANO 2011 was already working with the Communists and the far-right Freedom and Direct Democracy, he only needed ČSSD to legitimise his government. Sobotka eventually decided to leave politics, citing his opposition to coalition talks with ANO.

Hamáček demanded 5 seats for ČSSD in the new cabinet, including the Interior Minister and Justice Minister roles. Babiš offered the party only four cabinet positions, and refused to give ČSSD the Ministry of the Interior. Hamáček announced on 27 March 2018 that the party would hold a referendum of the membership to decide whether the party would be part of the coalition.

ČSSD persisted in its demands and suggested that it could walk away from coalition talks. Babiš eventually agreed to give ČSSD five seats, but refused to give up Ministry of the Interior. ČSSD then ended the coalition talks.

Babiš then stated that a coalition of ANO, Freedom and Direct Democracy (SPD) and the Communists was the only option remaining. However, ANO announced on 13 April 2018 that it would recommence talks with ČSSD. The Social Democrats agreed to continue with coalition talks when ANO agreed to give ČSSD five seats including the Ministry of the Interior, though the final decision would still be decided in a referendum.

Coalition talks concluded on 7 May 2018, with Hamáček and Babiš finalising the coalition agreement. ANO ratified the deal on 11 May 2018. ČSSD announced that members of the party would vote on the agreement between 21 May and 14 June 2018.

== Procedure ==
The voting took place at meetings of the party's local branches, with voting being deemed valid if the turnout was at least 25%. If the turnout was less than 25%, then the Central Executive Committee of ČSSD would decide whether the party joined the government. Branch meetings could allow voting only if 40% of members were present at the meeting. If the quorum was not met then voting would not take place and members of the organisation could not participate in the referendum.

== Campaign ==
ČSSD Senators, led by Milan Štěch, expressed their opposition to ČSSD participation in the new government on 25 April 2018. Štěch noted that ČSSD had promised not to participate in a government led by someone facing criminal charges. Štěch also announced that opponents of the coalition would campaign against ratification of the coalition agreement. Jiří Zimola criticised the Senators, saying they had misused their media attention.

Party leader Jan Hamáček originally refused to publish the names of the potential ČSSD ministers. Many prominent party members wanted to know the names of future ministers before voting. The party leadership eventually agreed to publish the names of the ministers before the referendum, and they did so on 18 May 2018.

Hamáček started the campaign on 14 May 2018 with a visit to the local party in Liberec. He then visited Pardubice, Hradec Králové, Jihlava and Teplice. Hamáček stated that both sides had a lot of support within the party. Jiří Zimola also started campaigning in favour of the coalition agreement. Roman Onderka visited some Moravian regions but did not endorse either side. Opponents of the coalition plans also started campaigning. Hamáček stated that he was not trying to convince members to vote to join the government, but to inform them about the agreement with ANO 2011. Hamáček met members of the Prague branch on 16 May 2018, and subsequently stated that the majority of ČSSD members in Prague supported participation in the new government.

ČSSD senators led by Milan Štěch started sending letters to ČSSD members on 18 May 2018. They warned against participation in a government led by Andrej Babiš and argued that previous cooperation with Andrej Babiš had led the party to be marginalised. The Ústí nad Labem regional branch expressed its opposition to ČSSD participation in the new government. The Plzeň regional branch also recommended that its members oppose participation in the government. However, the Central Bohemian branch expressed support for joining the government.

Both campaign went quiet towards the end of the referendum. In the end 60% of members voted in favour of joining the government.

=== Campaign positions ===
- Supporters
  - Jan Hamáček, leader of ČSSD.
  - Jiří Zimola, Deputy leader of ČSSD.
  - Jana Fialová, Deputy Chairwoman of ČSSD.
  - Michal Hašek, former governor of South Moravia.
  - Jiří Paroubek, Senate candidate and former leader.
  - Tomáš Svoboda, leader of Karlovy Vary regional branch.
  - Eva Syková, Senator.
  - Kateřina Valachová, former Minister of Education.
  - Martin Zrzavecký, Mayor of Plzeň.
- Opponents
  - Milan Štěch, President of the Senate. He was the main opponent of participation in the government.
  - Petr Vícha, leader of the Senatorial caucus. He was one of the leaders of opposition to participation in the government.
  - Miroslav Andrt, Chairman of the Ústí nad Labem branch.
  - Josef Bernard, Governor of the Plzeň region.
  - Milan Chovanec, leader of the Plzeň branch and former leader of the party.
  - Jiří Dienstbier Jr., Senator.
  - Oliver Pospíšil, leader of the Brno branch.
  - Bohuslav Sobotka, former leader and Prime Minister.
  - Ondřej Veselý, MP.
  - Lubomír Zaorálek, MP.

== Voting ==
Choice	Votes	%
Yes	6,675	58.53
No	4,584	40.20
Invalid/blank votes	145	1.27
Total	11,404	100%
Registered voters/turnout	17,614	64.74

Voting began on 20 May 2018. 37 of 46 ČSSD members in Dejvice participated in referendum. 29 voted for participation in the government while eight voted against. The Bohumín branch voted against participation. 16% of ČSSD members in Bohumín voted for participation. Voting in Opava and Orlová was close, but a majority voted against participation.

One third of the party's branches had voted by 25 February 2018. Turnout was around 70%. Prague, Central Bohemia, Pardubice and South Bohemian regions voted in support of government participation. It was reported on 28 May 2018 that 70% of voters supported government participation. It was reported on 31 May 2018 that 59.5% of voters had supported government participation so far. By 11 June 2018, 85% of party's organisations had voted. Lidové noviny reported that 60% of voters had supported government participation while 40% voted against.

Voting concluded on 14 June 2018, with 58.5% having voted in favour and 40.2% against. The official result was published on 15 June 2018.
