= 2018 Czech Social Democratic Party leadership election =

2018 ČSSD leadership election
- 18 February 2018
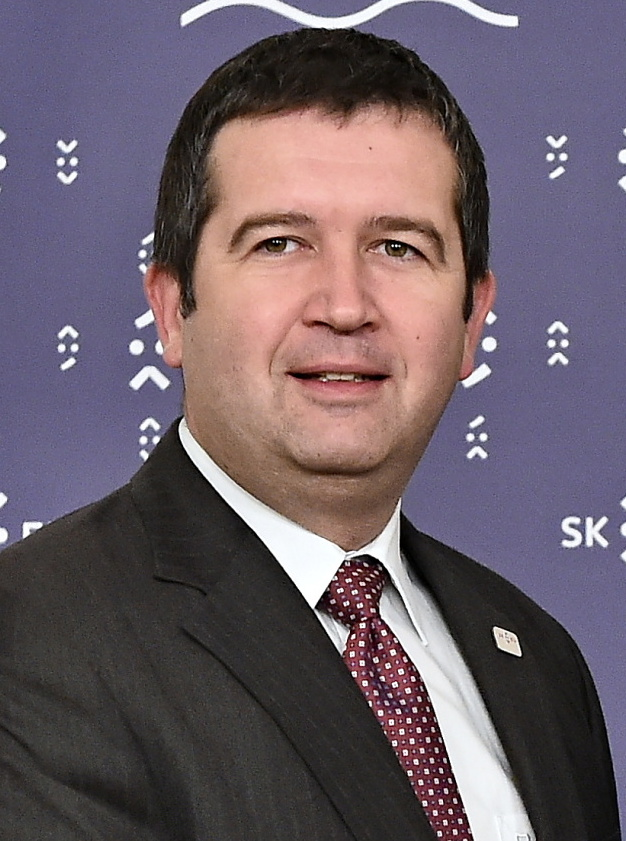

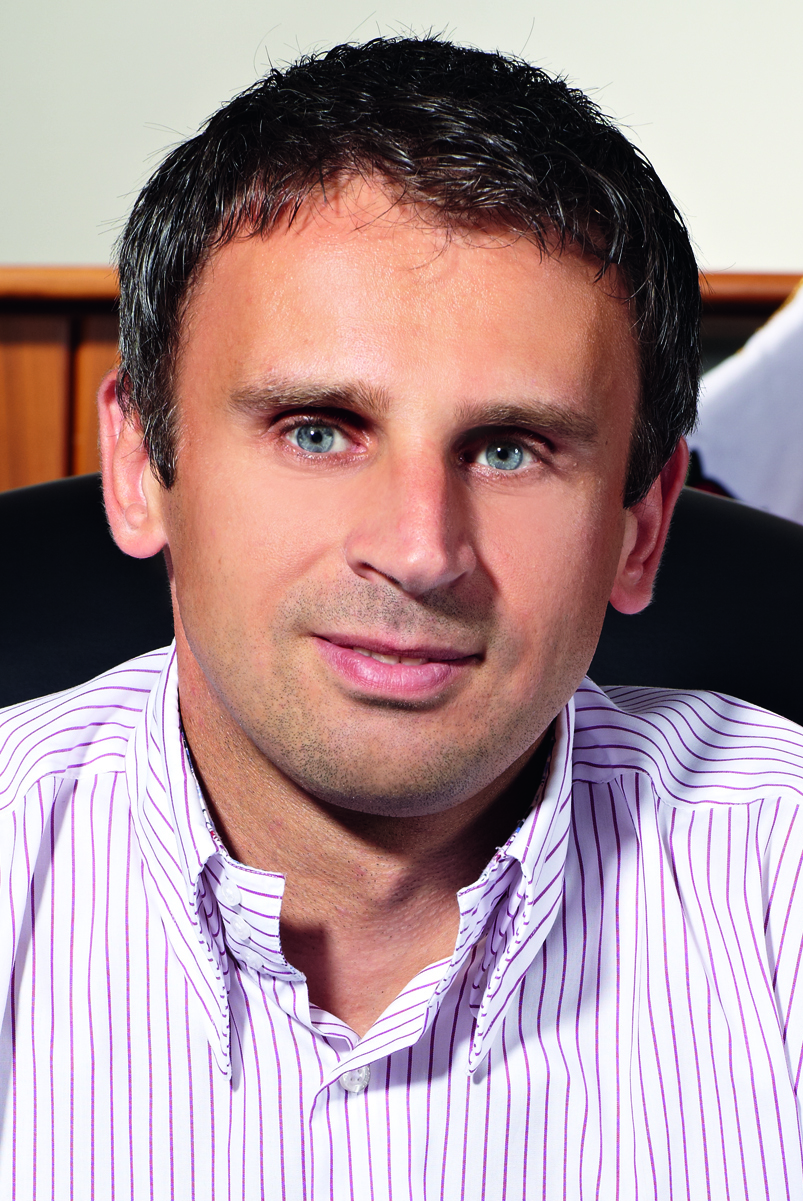
Candidate	Jan Hamáček	Jiří Zimola
Electoral vote	272	224
Percentage	54.8%	45.2%
Leader of ČSSD before election
Milan Chovanec (acting)
Elected Leader of ČSSD
Jan Hamáček

A leadership election for the Czech Social Democratic Party (ČSSD) was held in 2018 following the 2017 legislative election. Jan Hamáček was elected the new leader of the party, defeating Jiří Zimola in the second round.

== Background ==
In the previous leadership election, held in 2017, Prime Minister Bohuslav Sobotka was reelected as the party's leader and expressed his intention to remain in the position until 2019, when the next leader would be elected. Poor results in opinion polls led to Sobotka's resignation on 14 June 2017. Minister of Internal Affairs Milan Chovanec became acting leader of the party while Lubomír Zaorálek became the electoral leader for the 2017 legislative election. Chovanec announced on 29 July that the leadership election would be held in 2018, most likely in Spring. He mentioned March as a possible date. Lubomír Zaorálek announced his intention to participate in the election.

ČSSD suffered a heavy defeat in the 2017 election, coming sixth with 7% of the vote. Zaorálek stated that he did not intend to step down as party leader, but some prominent members of the party including Jaroslav Foldyna and Michal Hašek called for a change of leadership.

== Campaign ==
On 22 October 2017 Chovanec announced that party's meeting would be held on 7 April 2018. Milan Chovanec and Jan Hamáček were mentioned by commentators as potential main candidates. Chovanec was reported to be planning his candidacy. Zaorálek announced that he would not run for party leader due to the poor result in the legislative election. Chovanec stated on 28 October that the election should be direct and suggested that the new leader could be an independent. He also stated that he would not run for the position. Regional branches of the party were dissatisfied that the election would be held in April and wanted it to be held sooner. On 3 November 2017, it was announced the election would be held on 18 February 2018. Jaroslav Foldyna and Jiří Zimola were mentioned as possible candidates. Roman Onderka received support from the South Moravian branch for running for any position in the party's management. Some prominent members of the organisation stated that Onderka should consider running for leadership of the party.

ČSSD decided to allow independent politicians to run for the position, enabling Vysočina governor Běhounek to stand. Běhounek announced he would run for the position if some members of the party returned to prominent leadership positions, including Jiří Zimola, Michal Hašek and Jeroným Tejc. These individuals stated that they did not intend to return to these positions. Tejc even left the party, saying there was a lack of responsibility for the disastrous result in 2017 legislative election. Běhounek was criticised for his ties with Hašek.

On 20 December 2017, Milan Chovanec stated that he might run for the position of leader, and would announce his decision on 18 January 2018. On 8 January 2018, Jan Hamáček attended a conference of Mladá Boleslav ČSSD. He announced his candidacy at the meeting, saying that ČSSD had to fight for its survival, and that the party had to focus on its traditional voters. Hamáček received his nomination for the candidacy at the conference. On 9 January 2018, Miroslav Krejčík announced his candidacy. Mayor of Olomouc Staněk announced his candidacy on 11 January 2018. He received nominations from three district branches.

On 11 January 2018, Milan Chovanec received nominations from the Plzeň-city and Tachov branches of ČSSD. He stated that he had not yet decided if he would run, but was considering it. On 12 January 2018, the Ostrava district branch nominated Miroslav Krejčík and Jiří Zimola. Chovanec accepted the nomination and announced his candidacy on 28 January 2018. Chovanec is a supporter of Czech president Miloš Zeman and was present at Zeman's electoral headquarters when Zeman was re-elected for a second term on 27 January 2018. Chovanec received nominations from the Zlín and Plzeň regional branches. Chovanec and Hamáček were considered front-runners of the election at that time. Jiří Zimola also announced his candidacy on 28 January 2018. Zimola is a member of a platform called "Let's Save ČSSD" and a supporter of Miloš Zeman. He is also considered an ally of Andrej Babiš and ANO 2011. Hamáček on the other hand is supported by a faction that opposes Zeman and supported Jiří Drahoš during the presidential election.

Hamáček received nominations from five regions (Prague, Central Bohemia, Karlovy Vary, Hradec Králové and Liberec). Chovanec received nominations from 3 regions (Plzeň, Ústí nad Labem and Zlín). The other candidates received nominations from one region each; Zimola was nominated by South Bohemia, Staněk by Olomouc region, Krejčík by South Bohemia, and Žatecká by Liberec region. Jukl did not receive a nomination from any region. Vysočina and Pardubice regions did not nominate any candidate. Hamáček was considered to be the front runner due to his greater number of nominations.

The question of whether ČSSD should join a coalition with ANO 2011 became the main issue of the campaign; Hamáček and Zimola support joining the coalition while Chovanec is opposed. Jan Jukl, Romana Žatecká and Jiří Sokol are also against the coalition with ANO. Chovanec made his opinion public in a letter to party members warning them that participation in the coalition government would hurt the party. He also criticised his rivals Hamáček and Zimola. Hamáček later published his own letter in which he criticised Chovanec and argued that the party should negotiate with ANO.

Hamáček was considered the front-runner due to his high number of nominations. His main rival was believed to be Milan Chovanec, with Jiří Zimola considered the third strongest candidate. Mladá fronta DNES speculated that Miroslav Krejčík could be the dark horse of the election. Chovanec succeeded in convincing delegates from North Moravia to support him.

== Candidates ==
- Milan Chovanec, acting leader of the party. News website Politico described him as the most likely new leader. He announced his candidacy on 28 January 2018. He is a part of the faction that supports President Miloš Zeman, and believes that ČSSD should stay in opposition.
- Jan Hamáček, Deputy Speaker of the Chamber of Deputies. He has been described as the candidate of the liberal wing of the party. He announced his candidacy on 8 January 2018.
- Jan Jukl, local politician from Polička.
- Miroslav Krejčík, former Chief of military Intelligence.
- Jiří Sokol, announced his candidacy on 16 February 2018. He withdrew before voting started.
- Antonín Staněk, Mayor of Olomouc.
- Romana Žatecká, Mayor of Česká Lípa
- Jiří Zimola, former governor of the South Bohemian Region. He has been described as the candidate of the conservative wing of the party, and is close to Miloš Zeman. He announced his candidacy on 28 January 2018. He believes that ČSSD should enter the government with ANO 2011.

=== Speculative ===
- Jiří Běhounek, Governor of Vysočina Region. He has support within the party, and did not rule out standing. As he is not a member of the party, his candidacy would require the party's statutes to be changed.
- Jan Chvojka, Minister for Human Rights and Equal Opportunities. Lubomír Zaorálek has stated that Chvojka is interested in the position.
- Michal Hašek, former governor of the South Moravian Region. He was suggested by Jiří Paroubek. He ruled out his candidacy on 3 November 2017.
- Roman Onderka, former mayor of Brno.
- Jiří Paroubek, former leader of the party. He left ČSSD in 2011 and established a new party, National Socialists – Left of the 21st century, but has announced his intention to return to ČSSD. His return had to be approved by the Prague branch but was rejected. He stated that opponents of his return are afraid that he could run for the party leadership.

=== Refused ===
- Jaroslav Foldyna, MP. Foldyna decided to run for position of Deputy chairman instead.
- Bohuslav Sobotka, former prime minister and former leader of ČSSD. He initially refused to run, but on 28 December 2017, he announced he would run for the leadership if the party allowed him to return.
- Lubomír Zaorálek, ČSSD candidate for Prime Minister. He announced he would not be running on 27 October 2017.

== Opinion polls ==
Date	Agency	Sample	Milan Chovanec	Jan Hamáček	Jiří Zimola	Miroslav Krejčík	Antonín Staněk	Jan Jukl	Romana Žatecká	Undecided
6 Feb 2018	Phoenix Research	970 ČSSD supporters	17%	14%	13%	10%	8%	4%	2%	32%
6 Feb 2018	Phoenix Research	970 voters	16%	12%	15%					

== Voting ==
Candidate	1st Round		2nd Round	
Jan Hamáček	155	29.81%	272	54.84%
Jiří Zimola	179	34.42%	224	45.16%
Milan Chovanec	116	22.31%		
Miroslav Krejčík	30	5.77%		
Antonín Staněk	21	4.04%		
Romana Žatecká	13	2.50%		
Jan Jukl	6	1.15%		
Turnout	520	98.86%	516	98.10%

The election was held on 18 February 2018. President Miloš Zeman attended the party meeting and suggested that the party should join a coalition with ANO 2011, but he did not endorse any particular candidate. Zeman also warned the party against excluding different opinions within the party. The election was preceded by a debate between the delegates. Michal Picl argued against a coalition with ANO. Kateřina Valachová said that ČSSD should be confident and find its own equivalent to Robert Fico. Jan Mládek criticised Bohuslav Sobotka's leadership and said that Sobotka had only tried to keep his position, and had not presented a program to the voters. He added that the party should elect a candidate with strong ideas. Lubomír Zaorálek said that the new leader should have empathy.

The candidates then made their nomination speeches. Jiří Sokol withdrew his candidacy. Hamáček stated that he wanted to unify the party. He talked about engaging in discussions with the party membership, and said he would open the party for the people and build a welfare state, and that ČSSD should support justice for people. Hamáček also expressed the view that the party should negotiate with ANO 2011 about joining the government. Chovanec said he knew he wasn't a perfect candidate, and is different from Emmanuel Macron or Robert Fico. He said that ČSSD should not join a coalition with ANO, but should focus on issues of interest to the people, such as executions. Chovanec concluded by saying that he was offering his experience and skills but did not want anything back. Jan Jukl opposed a coalition with ANO, and said that the party should return to trustworthy politics. Miroslav Krejčík talked about the situation in the party before the 2017 legislative election, saying that he and the party's supporters had not understood the party leadership or their strategy, and the party was unable to communicate with voters. He added that relaunching the party was not enough. Staněk said he wanted to return ČSSD to trustworthiness. Zimola's supporters gave pink glasses to delegates, and during his speech Zimola said these glasses were to represent the current party leadership's view of the party's situation, and that they could not see the party's problems. He said that the party was supporting many things their supporters did not agree with, and the party should refocus on problems relevant to its base. He said that the people wanted to take back the state that capitalist elites had stolen from them. He received a lot of applause for his speech.

Jiří Zimola and Jan Hamáček advanced to the second round; Zimola received 178 votes while Hamáček received 156. Hamáček won the second round, with 272 votes to Zimola's 224.
