= 2017 Czech parliamentary election =

- 20–21 October 2017

All 200 seats in the Chamber of Deputies 101 seats needed for a majority
- Opinion polls
- Turnout: 60.79% (▲1.35pp)
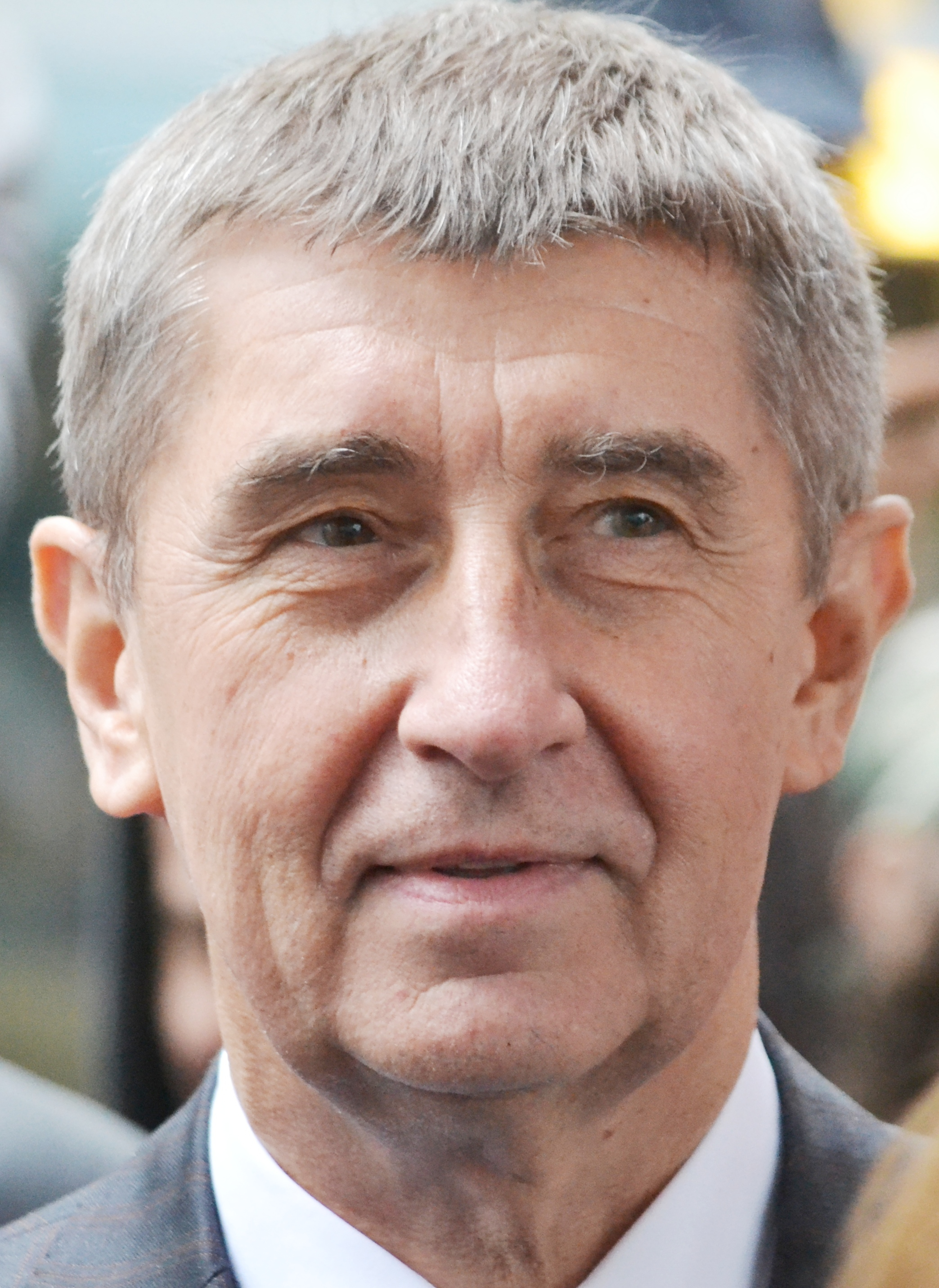

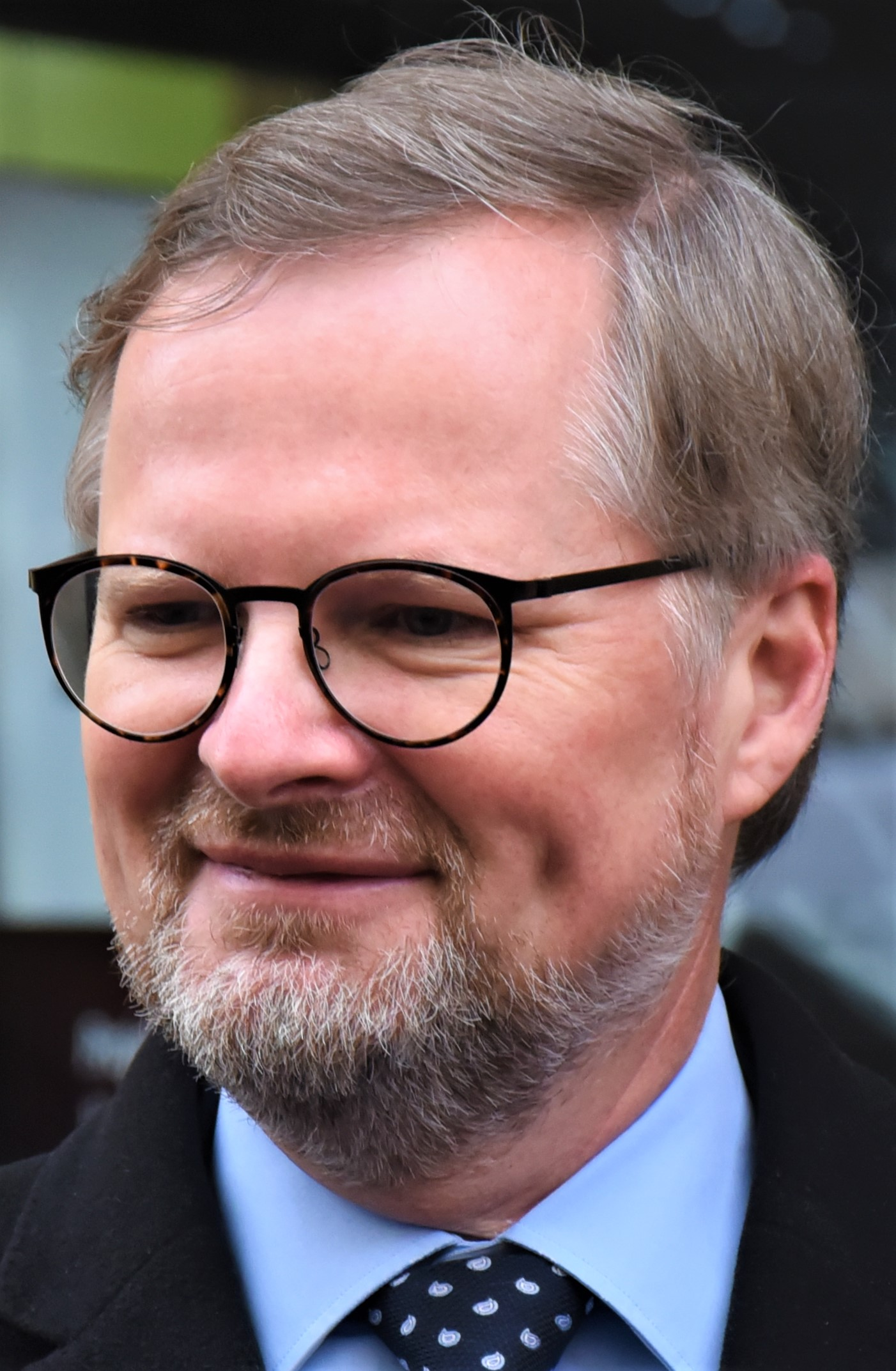

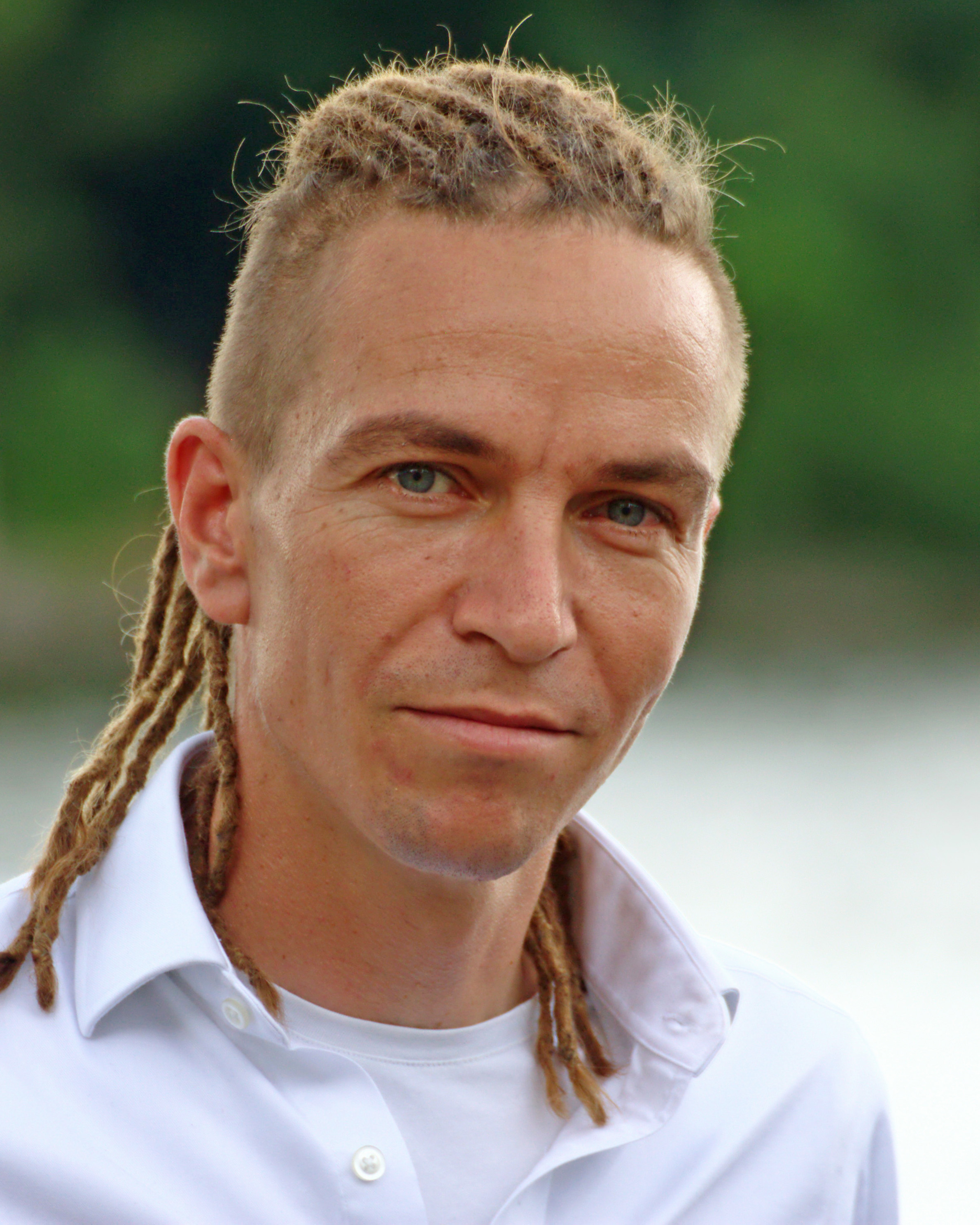

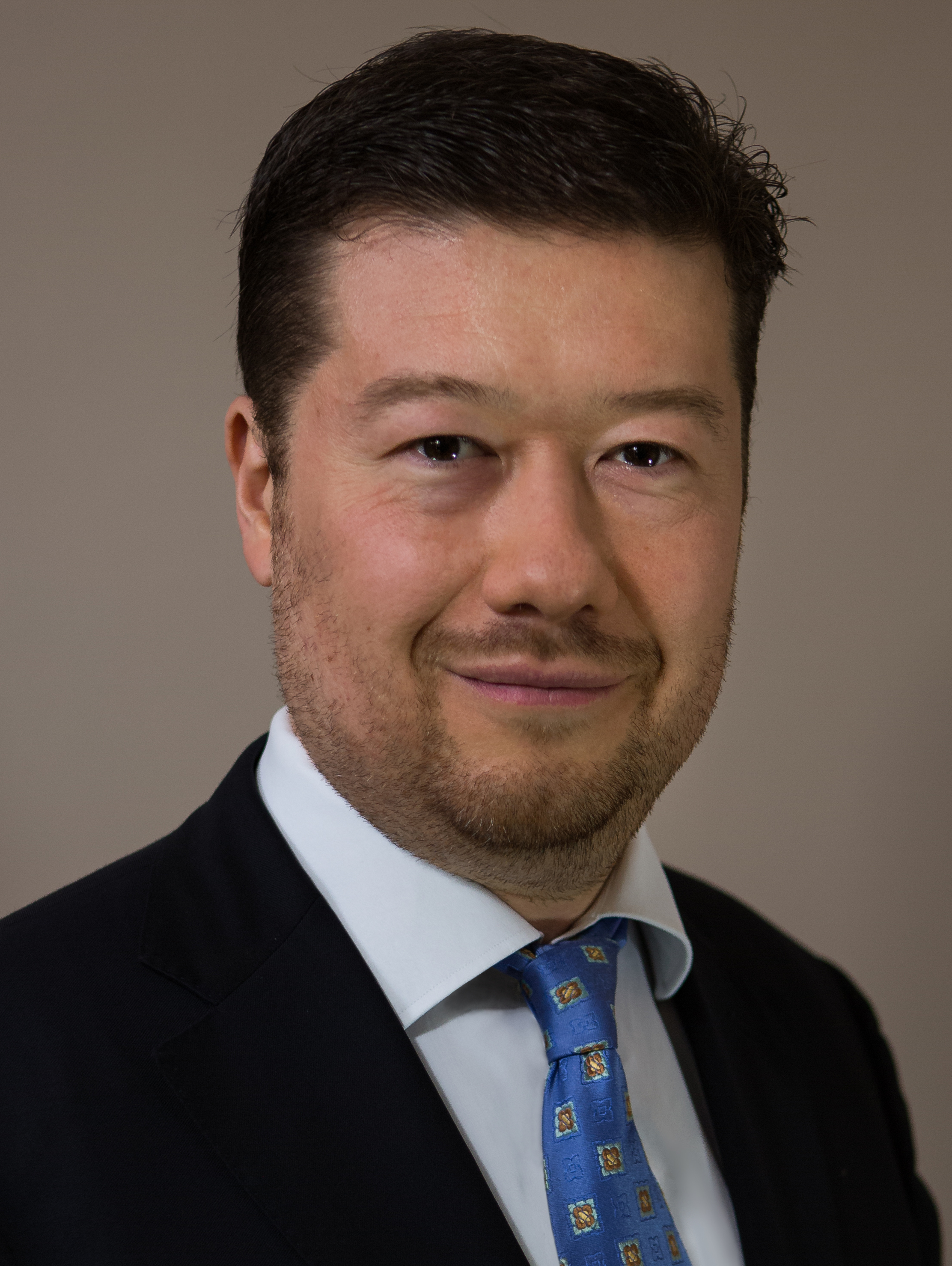

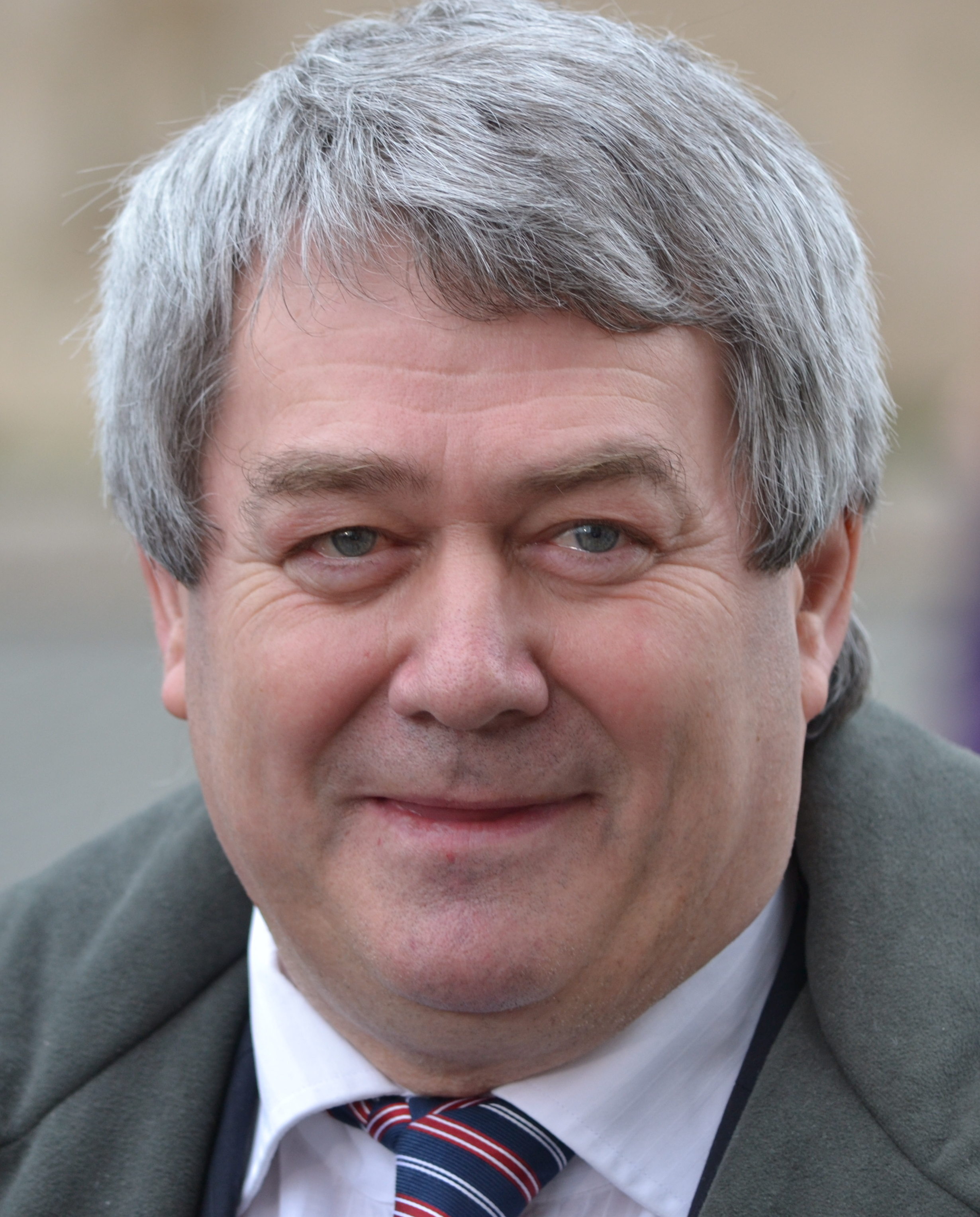

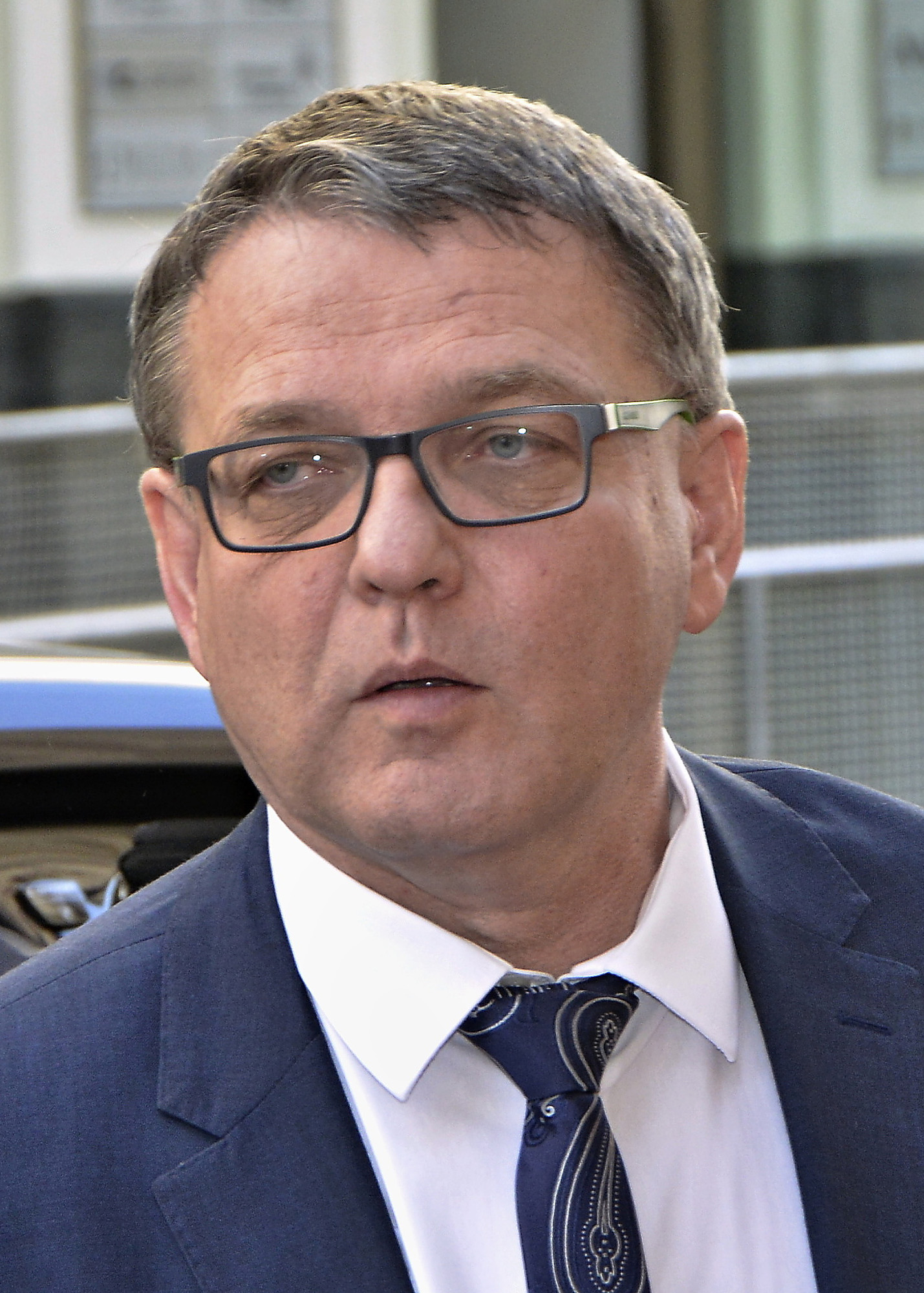

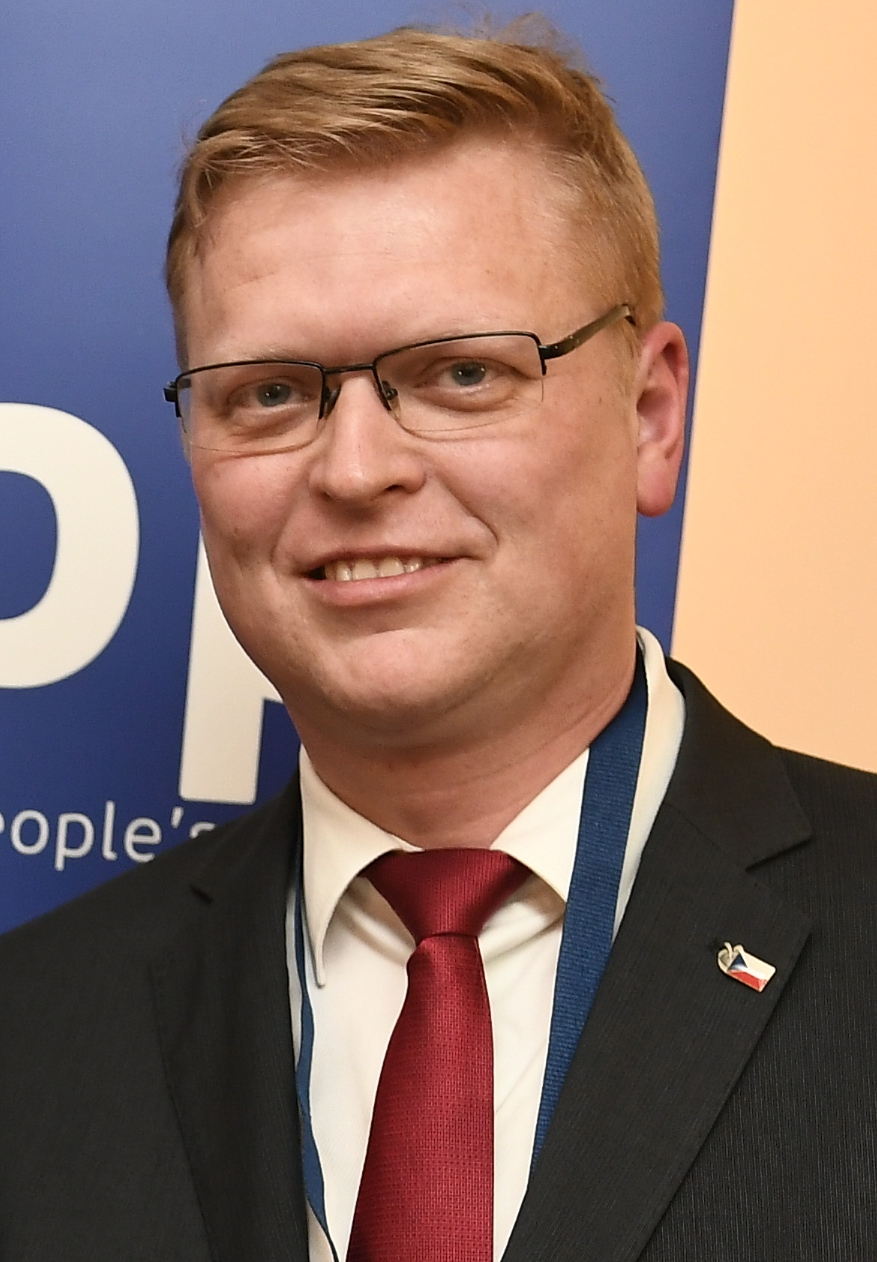

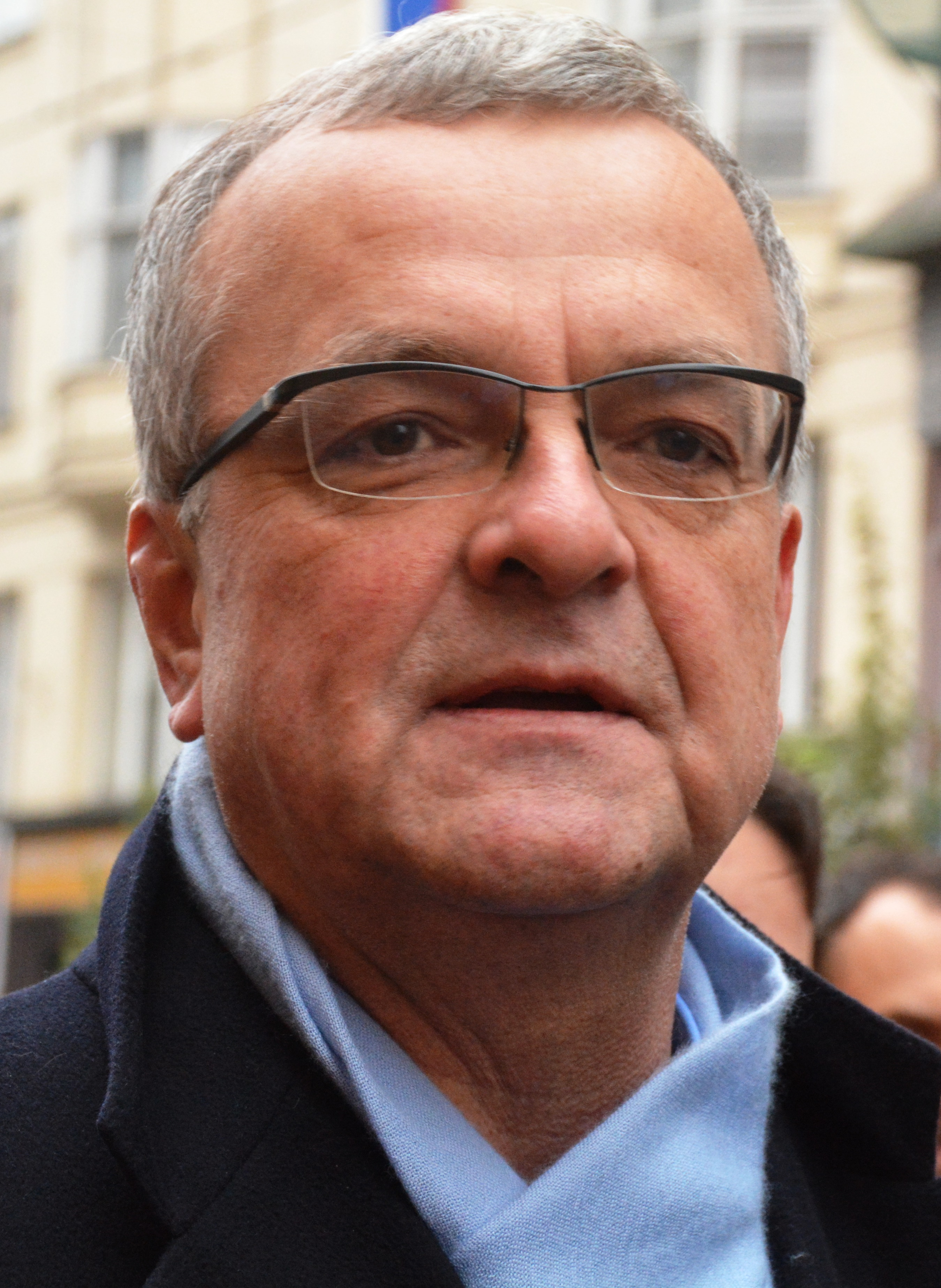

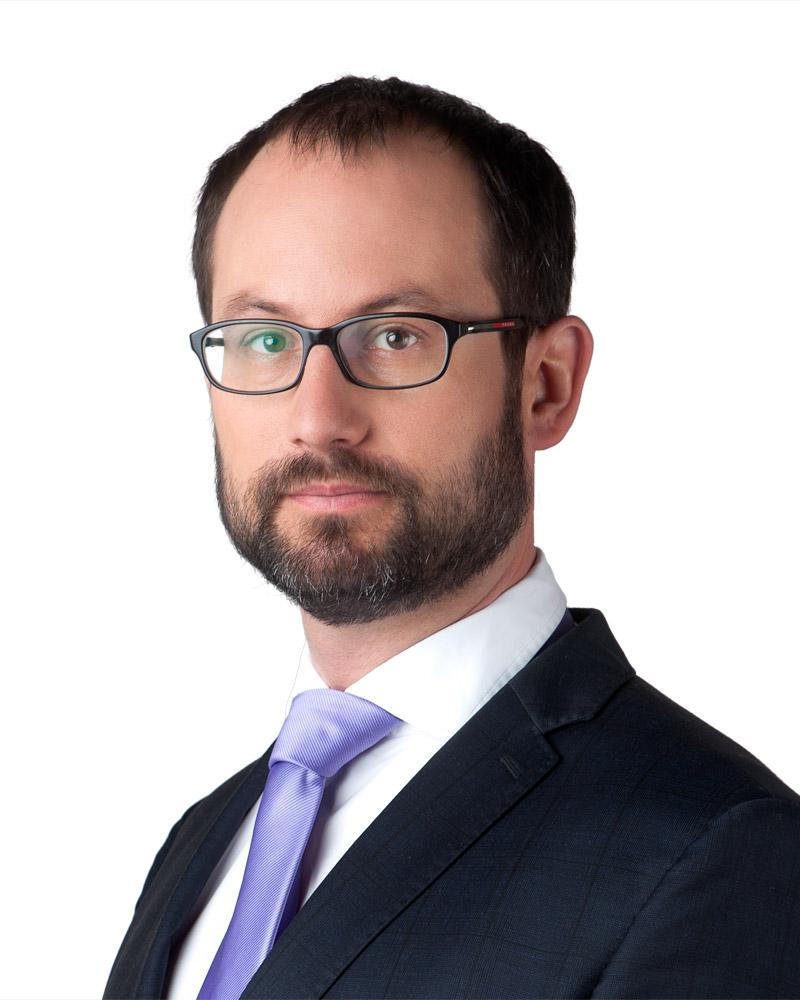
	First party	Second party	Third party
Leader	Andrej Babiš	Petr Fiala	Ivan Bartoš
Party	ANO	ODS	Pirates
Last election	18.66%, 47 seats	7.73%, 16 seats	2.66%, 0 seats
Seats won	78	25	22
Seat change	▲31	▲9	▲22
Popular vote	1,500,113	572,962	546,393
Percentage	29.64%	11.32%	10.80%
Swing	▲10.98pp	▲3.59pp	▲8.14pp
	Fourth party	Fifth party	Sixth party
Leader	Tomio Okamura	Vojtěch Filip	Lubomír Zaorálek
Party	SPD	KSČM	ČSSD
Last election	–	14.91%, 33 seats	20.46%, 50 seats
Seats won	22	15	15
Seat change	New	▼18	▼35
Popular vote	538,574	393,100	368,347
Percentage	10.6%	7.77%	7.28%
Swing	New	▼7.14pp	▼13.18pp
	Seventh party	Eighth party	Ninth party
Leader	Pavel Bělobrádek	Miroslav Kalousek	Jan Farský
Party	KDU-ČSL	TOP 09	STAN
Last election	6.78%, 14 seats	12.00%, 26 seats	–
Seats won	10	7	6
Seat change	▼4	▼19	New
Popular vote	293,643	268,811	262,157
Percentage	5.80%	5.31%	5.18%
Swing	▼0.98pp	▼6.69pp	New
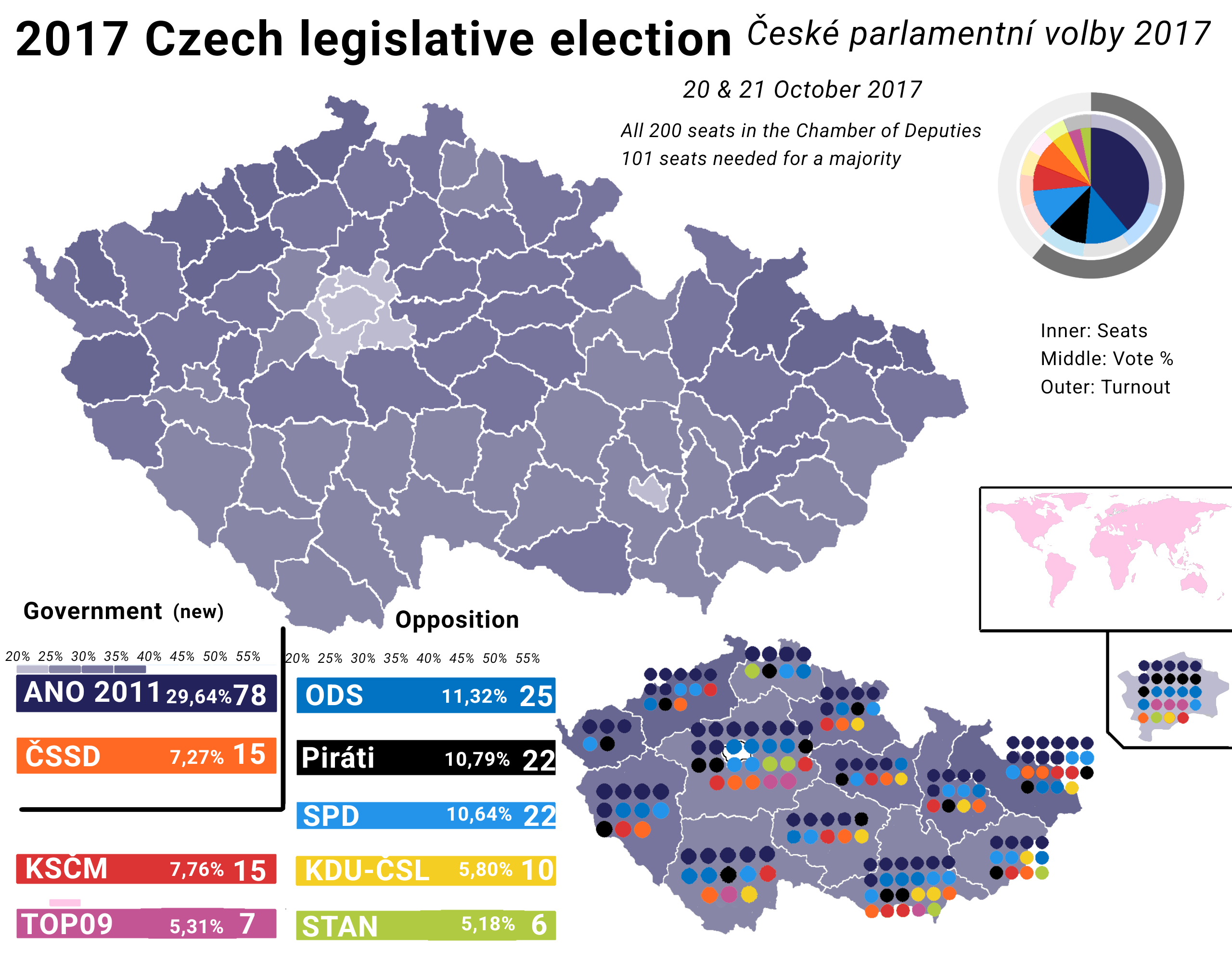
Prime Minister before election
Bohuslav Sobotka
ČSSD
Prime Minister after election
Andrej Babiš
ANO

Parliamentary elections were held in the Czech Republic on 20 and 21 October 2017. All 200 members of the Chamber of Deputies were elected and Andrej Babiš of ANO, also the leader of the resultant government, became the Prime Minister. The coalition government following the 2013 parliamentary elections consisted of the two largest parties: the Czech Social Democratic Party (ČSSD) of Prime Minister Bohuslav Sobotka, and ANO, led by former Finance Minister and businessman Andrej Babiš, alongside the Christian and Democratic Union – Czechoslovak People's Party (KDU–ČSL). The largest opposition party was the Communist Party of Bohemia and Moravia (KSČM), followed by centre-right parties TOP 09 and the Civic Democratic Party (ODS).

Opinion polling showed ANO leading since early 2014, with their lead gradually increasing to double digits. ČSSD had been losing ground since early 2017, polling in the low double figures from May 2017. Polls indicated that several other parties, including KSČM, ODS, KDU–ČSL, and TOP 09, were likely to re-enter the Chamber of Deputies, with support fluctuating between 5% and 12%. Across all parties, 7,524 candidates stood for election, setting a national record. There were 37 candidates per seat.

The result was a victory for populist party ANO, which received 29.6% of the vote and 78 seats. ODS were the second strongest party, receiving 11.3% and 25 seats. The ruling ČSSD fell to 7%, finishing sixth. Both the Czech Pirate Party and Freedom and Direct Democracy received over 10% and became new parliamentary parties. Nine parties entered the lower chamber, resulting in the most fragmented Chamber of Deputies in the history of the Czech Republic. This was also the first time that neither ČSSD nor ODS won the parliamentary election. After eight months of negotiations, ANO and ČSSD agreed to form a minority coalition government, with a confidence and supply agreement with the KSČM which lasted until April 2021. This was the first time the Communists had participated in the national government since the Velvet Revolution in 1989.

== Background ==
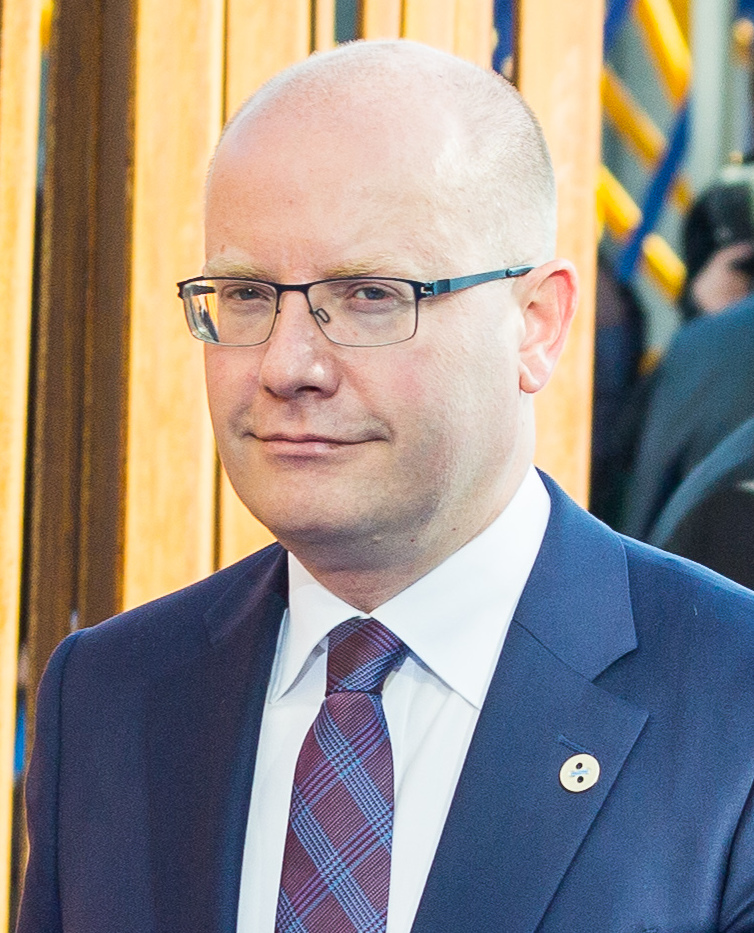
Bohuslav Sobotka served as Prime Minister from 2014 to 2017 and he was succeeded on 13 December 2017.

The Constitution of the Czech Republic stipulates that an election to the Chamber of Deputies, the lower house of the Parliament, must be held every four years. The Government is responsible to the Chamber of Deputies and stays in power only if has the confidence of the majority of members of parliament. Article 19(1) of the Constitution provides that any citizen of the Czech Republic who has right to vote and is twenty-one years old is eligible to serve as an MP.

The Social Democrats, the largest party following the 2013 elections, formed a centre-left Coalition government with ANO and KDU–ČSL. The Social Democrats were represented by eight ministers in the Government, with its leader, Bohuslav Sobotka, as Prime Minister. ANO, the runner-up in the election, was represented by six of its members in the Government, led by businessman Andrej Babiš, who was promoted to the role of the First Deputy Prime Minister and served as Finance Minister. The smallest party in the coalition, the Christian Democrats, were represented by three ministers, and their leader Pavel Bělobrádek held the position of Deputy Prime Minister. The biggest opposition party in the Chamber of Deputies was the Communist Party. The centre-right opposition to the government was represented by TOP 09 and the Civic Democrats.

=== 2014 Senate and municipal elections ===
In 2014, voters elected 29 out of 81 Senators and approximately 62,300 members of local councils. The Social Democrats won the Senate election but lost many bigger cities, including the capital Prague, to its coalition partner, ANO.

=== 2016 regional and Senate elections ===
In October 2016, voters elected 675 members of regional assemblies in 13 regions of the nation (except Prague) which then elected their regional leadership. ANO won the election with 21.05%, while the Social Democrats came first in only two regions – South Bohemia and Vysočina – with 15.25% nationwide. The Communists (KSČM) suffered the biggest loss, winning 10.54% and losing 96 seats in the assemblies. The centre-right ODS won 9.47% nationwide and 76 seats in regional assemblies.

Alongside the regional elections, about 2.7 million voters elected 27 of the 81 senators. The KDU-ČSL won these elections with nine new senators, while both ANO and the Social Democrats suffered heavy losses. Even though ANO had 14 candidates in the second round, only three managed to win election. The Social Democrats lost 10 seats, including that of their Vice President of the Senate Zdeněk Škromach. The centre-right ODS had six candidates in the second round, with four of them being elected (including Zdeněk Nytra, who ran as an independent).

=== 2017 Government crisis ===
The coalition government successfully passed many of the policies that had been announced in 2014, such as electronic registration of sales and reverse charging of value-added tax. Bohuslav Sobotka's Cabinet was considered by pundits and commentators to be stable compared with previous cabinets. However, in early May 2017 a government crisis developed when Prime Minister Bohuslav Sobotka resigned due to the financial irregularities of Finance Minister Andrej Babiš. Sobotka reversed his decision a few days later following a dispute with President Miloš Zeman over the continuation of the government, and on 24 May 2017, Sobotka dismissed Babiš and replaced him with Ivan Pilný, effectively ending the crisis.

== Electoral system ==
The 200 members of the Chamber of Deputies are elected from 14 multi-member constituencies (each usually electing between 5 and 25 members) using open list proportional representation, in which they can give preferential votes for up to four candidates on their chosen list. Seats are allocated using the d'Hondt method, with an electoral threshold of 5% nationwide for single parties, 10% for two-party alliances, 15% for three-party alliances and 20% for alliances of four or more parties. Candidates who receive preferential votes from more than 5% of voters are moved to the top of their list, and in cases where more than one candidate receives over 5% of the preferential votes, they are ranked in order of votes received.

== Date of the election ==
The Czech constitution states that elections to the Chamber of Deputies must be held every four years. Polling days in the Czech Republic are Friday and Saturday, and voters can submit their ballots on either day. The exact date of the election is chosen by the President, who is obliged to call it at least 90 days before the election is held. On 6 April 2017, President Zeman announced 20 and 21 October 2017 as election days.

== Contesting parties ==
Parties contesting the election included:

Party	Ideology	Leader
Czech Social Democratic Party (ČSSD)	Social democracy, Pro-Europeanism	Milan Chovanec (Acting)
ANO	Centrism, Populism, Liberalism, Syncretic politics	Andrej Babiš
Communist Party of Bohemia and Moravia (KSČM) • Party of Democratic Socialism	Communism, Euroscepticism	Vojtěch Filip
TOP 09 • The Czech Crown (Monarchist Party of Bohemia, Moravia and Silesia) • Conservative Party • Club of Committed Non-Party Members • Liberal-Environmental Party	Liberal conservatism, Pro-Europeanism	Miroslav Kalousek
Civic Democratic Party (ODS) • Freeholder Party	Conservatism, Economic liberalism, Euroscepticism	Petr Fiala
Christian and Democratic Union – Czechoslovak People's Party (KDU-ČSL) • Coexistencia and Independents	Christian democracy, Social conservatism, Pro-Europeanism	Pavel Bělobrádek
Mayors and Independents (STAN) • Mayors for Liberec Region • SNK European Democrats	Liberal conservatism, Subsidiarity, Pro-Europeanism	Petr Gazdík
Freedom and Direct Democracy (SPD) • The Moravians	Right-wing populism, Anti-immigration, Direct democracy, Euroscepticism	Tomio Okamura
Czech Pirate Party (Piráti)	Pirate politics, Direct and Participatory democracy, Open state, Liberalism	Ivan Bartoš
Green Party (Zelení) • Political Movement Change	Green politics, Pro-Europeanism	Matěj Stropnický
Party of Free Citizens (Svobodní)	Classical liberalism, Right-libertarianism, Libertarian conservatism, Euroscepticism	Petr Mach
Realists (REAL) • Patriots of the Czech Republic	National conservatism, Economic liberalism, Euroscepticism	Petr Robejšek
Party of Civic Rights (SPO)	Social democracy, Direct democracy	Jan Veleba
Party of Common Sense (Rozumní) • National Democracy • Change for People • Rally for the Republic – Republican Party of Bohemia, Moravia and Silesia • Democratic Party of Greens • Czech Movement for National Unity	Nationalism, National liberalism, Euroscepticism	Petr Hannig
Rally for the Republic – Republican Party of Czechoslovakia (SPR–RSČ)	National conservatism, Anti-immigration, Czechoslovak unionism, Euroscepticism	Miroslav Sládek
Workers' Party of Social Justice (DSSS)	Neo-Nazism, Ultranationalism, Anti-globalism, Euroscepticism	Tomáš Vandas

== Campaign ==
=== Background ===
For the first time in Czech elections, campaign spending was limited, with a cap of 90 million CZK (approximately €3,300,000) for each party. A new supervisory body was established, the Office for Supervision of Finances of Political Parties and Political Movements.

The date of the election was announced on 2 May 2017, marking the start of the official campaign. Parties were allowed to register for the election until 15 August 2017. 31 parties registered in total, the highest number ever.

=== Issues ===
At the time of the campaign, the minimum wage in the Czech Republic was 12,200 Czech crowns (around 472 euros). Although the minimum wage had increased by 24.6% since 2010 it was still lower than many other EU member states. Some voters expressed their feeling that incomes had stagnated and the quality of public services had declined, while fortunes were being made through dubious privatizations and the improper awarding of public service contracts.

Czech membership of the Eurozone also became a campaign issue, as although the Czech Republic has theoretically accepted the euro, it has not stated when it will adopt it. ČSSD, KDU-ČSL, the Greens and TOP 09 are all in favour of adopting the euro as early as possible, while ANO, the Communist Party and SPD reject it. ODS argue for delaying adoption of the euro, citing the European debt crisis.

=== Party campaigns ===
==== ANO ====
ANO, the front-runner in the election, launched its campaign on 3 May 2017, when media outlets owned by party leader Andrej Babiš published an image of Babiš with tape over his mouth, intended as a criticism of ČSSD.

On 10 August 2017, criminal proceedings began against Andrej Babiš, who is accused of subsidy fraud. The Chamber of Deputies was asked to remove Babiš's immunity so that he could be criminally prosecuted. Babiš expressed his view that the purpose of the criminal proceedings was to destroy him politically.

Babiš faced ODS leader Petr Fiala in a debate on 29 September 2017. They clashed over issues including corruption and the economy, but agreed on immigration.

ANO adopted Eurosceptic policies before the election, including opposition to the Euro, deeper European integration and immigration quotas, but took a more pro-EU stance after the campaign. Daniel Kaiser of Echo24 described the party's position on the EU as "Euro-opportunism".

==== Christian and Democratic Union – Czechoslovak People's Party (KDU–ČSL) ====
Joint logo of the Coalition of KDU-ČSL and STAN.

KDU–ČSL formed a political alliance with Mayors and Independents, called Populars and Mayors, with the aim of becoming the "third power" of Czech politics. Two-party alliances require 10% of votes to qualify for seats in the parliament. The alliance was dissolved in July 2017 as a result of poor results in opinion polls.

KDU-ČSL began its campaign at the beginning of August 2017, focusing on family, education, innovation and children. Pavel Bělobrádek announced that the symbol of the party's campaign was a house for three generations, with the campaign slogan: "Responsibly." Bělobrádek stated that he would resign if the party's result was worse than the 2013 election.

==== Civic Democratic Party (ODS) ====
The centre-right ODS launched their campaign in partnership with the Freeholder Party, which meant that 40 members of Freeholders would stand for election as representatives of the Civic Democrats. The Civic Democrats launched their campaign on 29 May 2017.

ODS launched its electoral program and announced its candidates on 19 April 2017, promising to lower taxes and cut subsidies and social benefits.

On 11 July 2017, the Civic Democrats said that they did not want to bother voters with politics during the summer holiday season, and launched a contest called "We are looking for the Seven Wonders of Czechia", in which voters would nominate interesting places in their regions that were not well known. In August 2017, ODS started its contact campaign, with leaders of the party stating that communication with citizens was the party's strongest electoral weapon. The party organised summer film screenings, projecting the film River Rascals to attract voters to its meetings.

On 17 August 2017, ODS published the Vyšehrad Proclamation, a list of conditions under which the party would join a coalition government, including lower taxes, refusal to adopt the Euro, rejection of immigration quotas, and ending the electronic sales record. The party launched the "hot phase" of their campaign on 1 September 2017, known as "Blue Wave."

On 29 September 2017, party leader Petr Fiala faced Andrej Babiš in a debate at Barrandov. Babiš attacked Fiala over the previous ODS government's record, but Fiala was widely considered to have won the debate, attacking Babiš's politics and his business.

==== Communist Party of Bohemia and Moravia (KSČM) ====
The Communist KSČM ran their campaign on an anti-NATO platform.

==== Czech Pirate Party (Piráti) ====
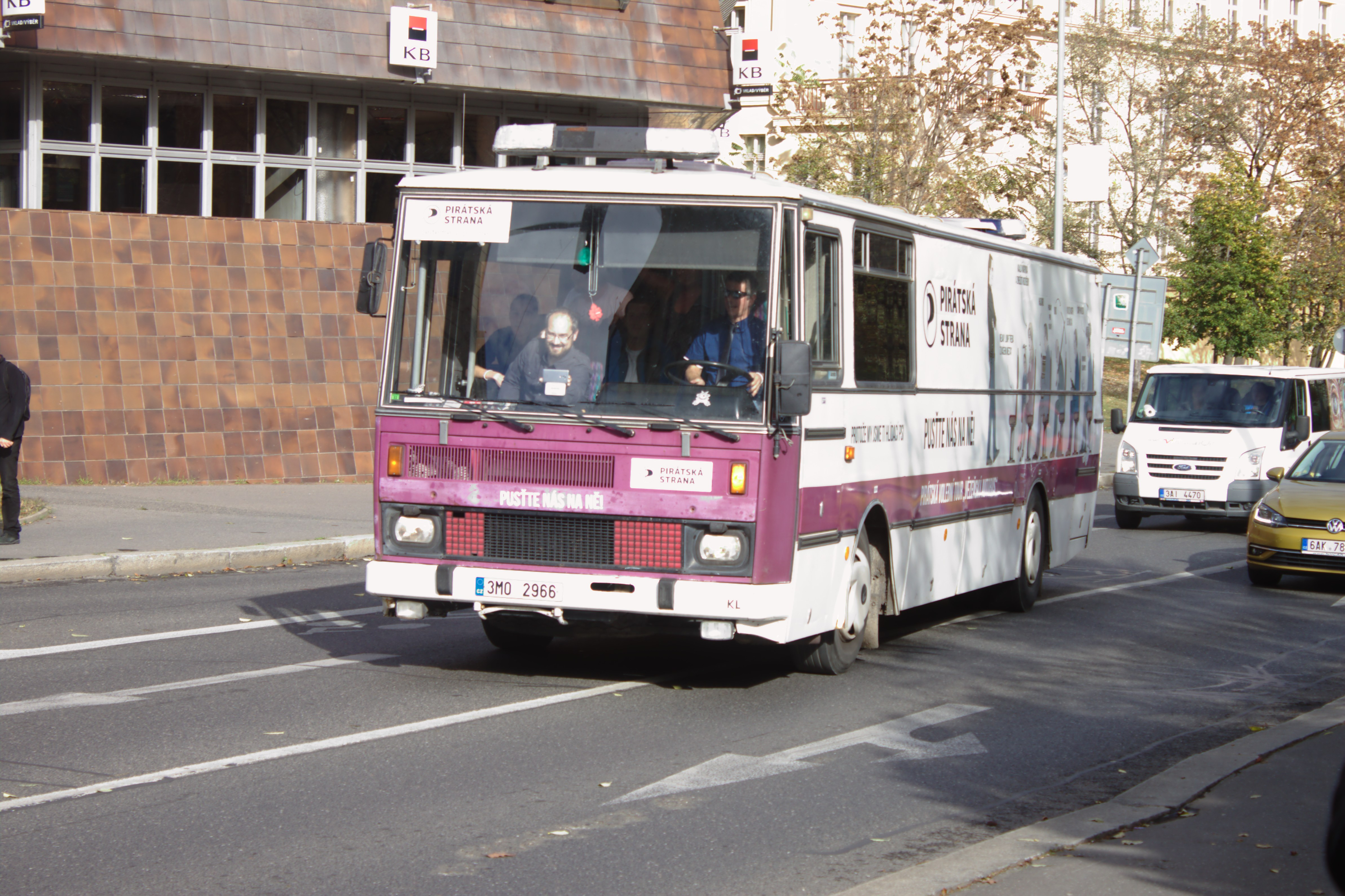
Czech Pirate Party's campaign bus

The Pirates launched their campaign on 22 May 2017, aiming to win 10% of votes. They called for radical tax reforms and changes to government administration.

On 17 October 2017, a 2016 picture of party leader Ivan Bartoš at an Anti-Fascist Action demonstration was published on the social media accounts of nationalist organization Pro-Vlast. Another picture showed Bartoš attending a left-wing demonstration in 2016 held in support of refugees. Bartoš admitted attending the demonstrations and suggested the photos had been used to run a campaign against his persona.

==== Czech Social Democratic Party (ČSSD) ====
Following the government crisis in May 2017, polls registered a drop in support for the Social Democrats and ANO, and an increase for the Civic Democrats. A poll by Kantar TNS showing ČSSD in fourth place prompted speculation over Bohuslav Sobotka's position as party leader, and he resigned as leader of ČSSD on 15 June 2017. Milan Chovanec became acting party leader and Lubomír Zaorálek became the Social Democrat candidate for Prime Minister. The party's campaign manager, Jan Birke MP, resigned two days after Sobotka.

The Social Democrats experienced internal party conflict in the South Bohemian Region over the rejection of candidates, including former Governor Jiří Zimola. On 5 June 2017, some ČSSD candidates in the region refused to stand for the party, in protest at the party's decision not to include Zimola on their list.

The Social Democrats launched their campaign and election platform on 19 June 2017. On 29 August 2017, Lubomír Zaorálek launched the party's official campaign.

==== Freedom and Direct Democracy (SPD) ====
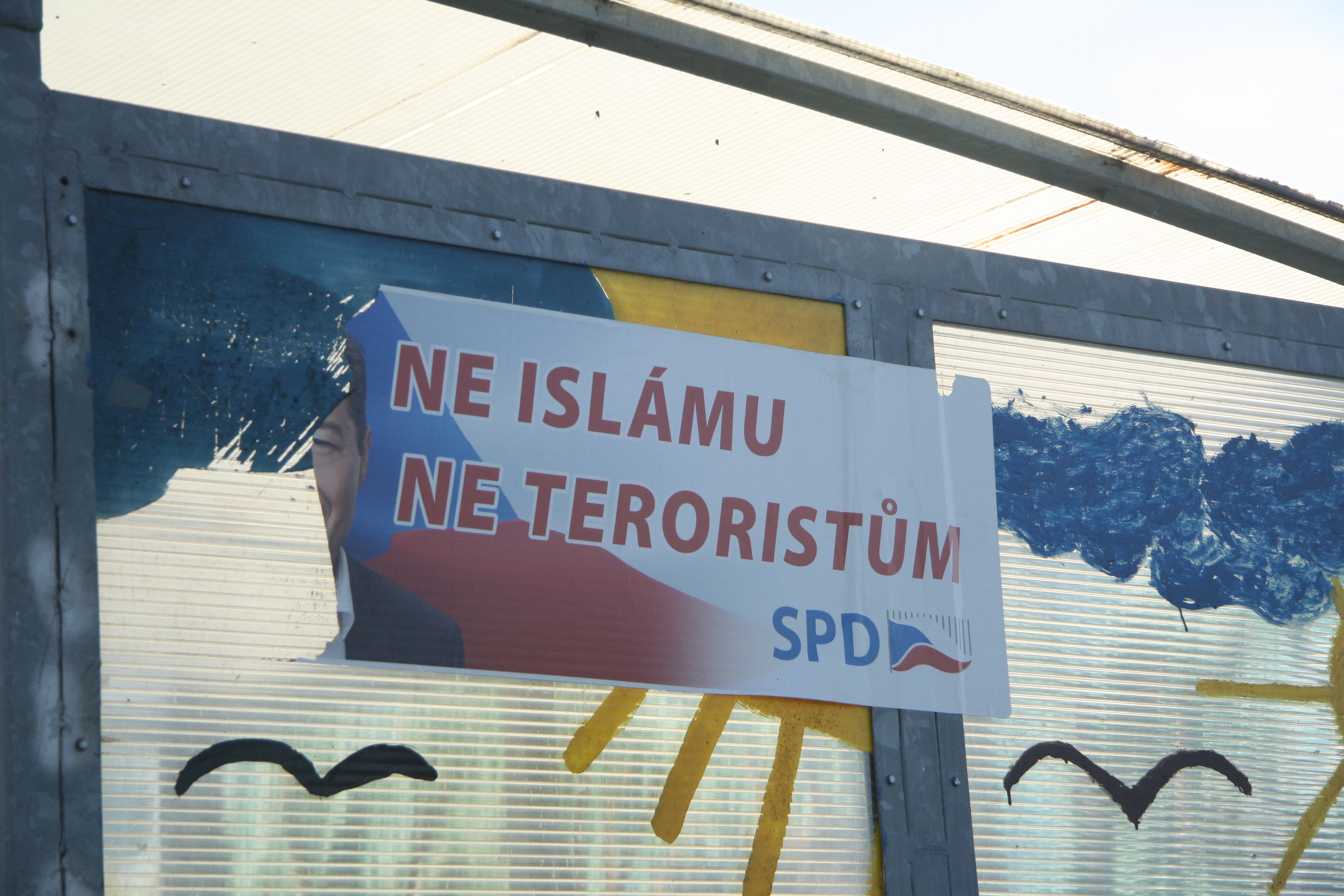

SPD campaigned under the slogan "No to Islam, No to terrorists." It was speculated that Freedom and Direct Democracy would participate in the election together with the Party of Civic Rights, but SPD leader Tomio Okamura announced on 14 February that the party would stand independently. Okamura borrowed 18 million Czech koruna for the campaign.

SPD launched its campaign on 20 July, with the aim of winning over 10%. The party called for a law enabling national referendums to be held more easily, and supported a referendum on leaving the European Union. Polls at the beginning of October showed support for SPD growing.

French politician Marine Le Pen endorsed SPD before the election.

==== Green Party ====
The Greens launched their campaign on 16 June 2017. Matěj Stropnický stated that he hoped the party would receive 6–8% of votes. They received less than 1.5%.

==== Mayors and Independents (STAN) ====
STAN launched its campaign on 27 July 2017, introducing its new logo and election leader Jan Farský.

==== Party of Civic Rights (SPO) ====
SPO was supported by president Miloš Zeman. SPO sought to form an alliance with Tomio Okamura's Freedom and Direct Democracy, but Okamura declined.

On 11 August 2017, SPO announced that František Ringo Čech would be its election leader.

==== Realists (REAL) ====
The Realists launched their campaign on 14 February 2017, intending to get 20% of votes. Their campaign focused on the introduction of a 15% flat tax and security issues. On 2 June 2017, the party launched their campaign, "Change of style". Members of the party appeared on billboards with their image changed, and were shown in casual clothes.

==== TOP 09 ====
TOP 09 launched its campaign on 30 May 2017, mainly focusing on being in the "faster lane" of the European Union and adopting the Euro.

On 12 July, TOP 09 announced that it would cooperate with the Liberal-Environmental Party.

=== Television debates ===
The public ČT24 broadcast a series of debates with spokespeople from the ten biggest parties on various issues, including national security, healthcare, foreign policy and infrastructure, among others. A debate between the leaders of the ten parties was broadcast on 19 October 2017.

=== Campaign finances ===
Party	Money spent	Source
Czech Social Democratic Party	85,300,000 CZK	
ANO	83,300,000 CZK	
Civic Democratic Party	82,700,000 CZK	
TOP 09	74,800,000 CZK	
Mayors and Independents	56,700,000 CZK	
Christian and Democratic Union – Czechoslovak People's Party	55,600,000 CZK	
Communist Party of Bohemia and Moravia	35,400,000 CZK	
Freedom and Direct Democracy	33,200,000 CZK	
Realists	31,100,000 CZK	
Civic Democratic Alliance	25,000,000 CZK	
Party of Civic Rights	19,000,000 CZK	
Czech Pirate Party	16,300,000 CZK	
Green Party	13,500,000 CZK	
Party of Free Citizens	7,360,000 CZK	
Party of Common Sense	400,000 CZK	

== Opinion polls ==
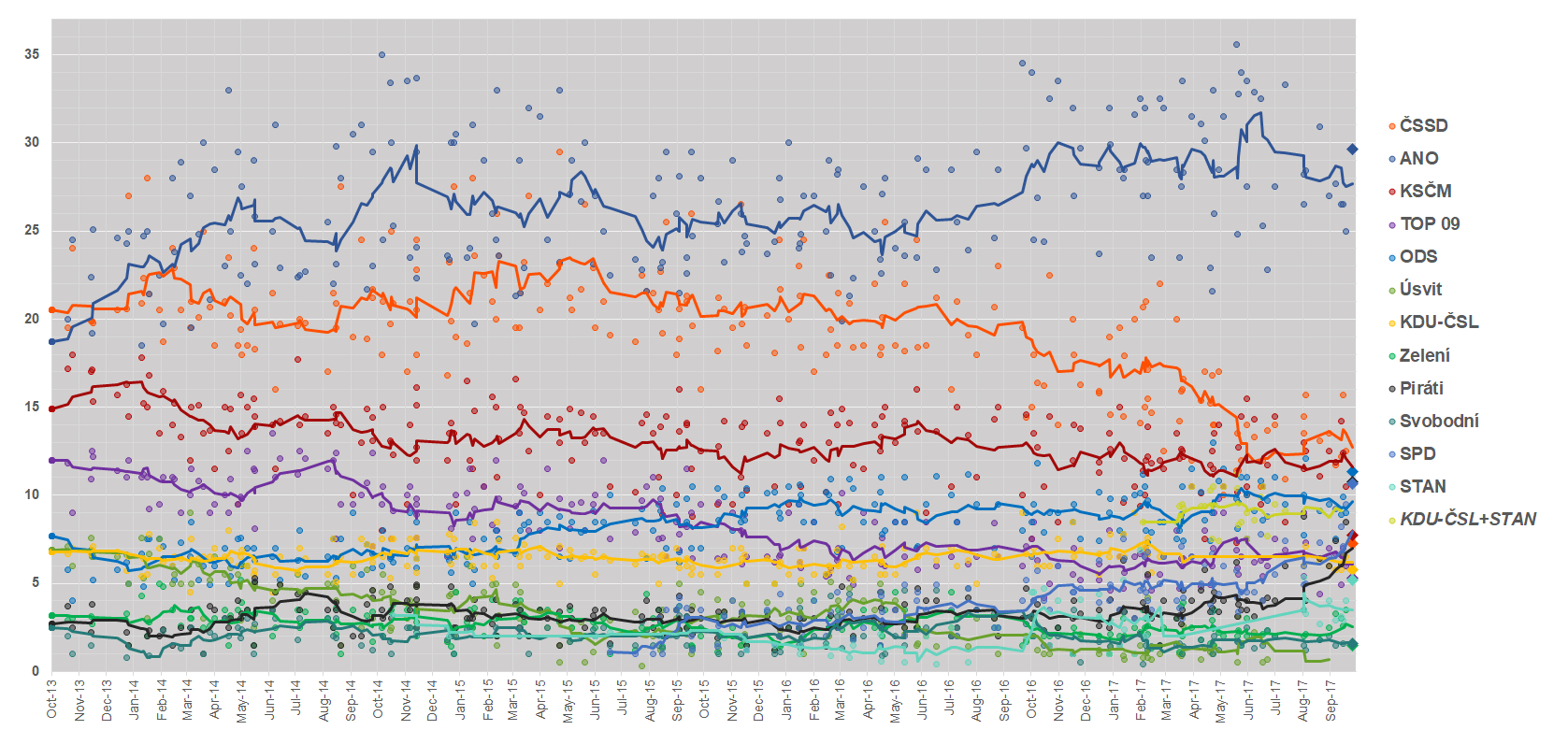

The polls are from October 2013 up to the current date with each line and dots corresponding to a political party.

== Results ==
Media coverage of the election results focused on the entry of SPD and the Pirates into the parliament for the first time, the "fragmented Parliament with nine parties", and the massive loss of support for the Social Democrats.

Party	Votes	%	+/–	Seats	+/–
ANO	1,500,113	29.64	+10.98	78	+31
Civic Democratic Party	572,962	11.32	+3.59	25	+9
Czech Pirate Party	546,393	10.80	+8.13	22	+22
Freedom and Direct Democracy	538,574	10.64	New	22	New
Communist Party of Bohemia and Moravia	393,100	7.77	−7.15	15	−18
Czech Social Democratic Party	368,347	7.28	−13.09	15	−35
KDU-ČSL	293,643	5.80	−0.98	10	−4
TOP 09	268,811	5.31	−6.69	7	−19
Mayors and Independents	262,157	5.18	New	6	New
Party of Free Citizens	79,229	1.57	−0.91	0	0
Green Party	74,335	1.47	−1.74	0	0
Party of Common Sense	36,528	0.72	+0.45	0	0
Realists	35,995	0.71	New	0	New
Party of Civic Rights	18,556	0.37	−1.15	0	0
Sportsmen	10,593	0.21	New	0	New
Workers' Party of Social Justice	10,402	0.21	−0.66	0	0
SPR–RSČ	9,857	0.19	New	0	New
Order of Nation – Patriotic Union	8,735	0.17	New	0	New
Civic Democratic Alliance	8,030	0.16	New	0	New
Bloc Against Islamization – Defence of the Homeland	5,077	0.10	New	0	New
Referendum on the European Union	4,276	0.08	New	0	New
Happy Czechia	3,852	0.08	New	0	New
Path of Responsible Society	3,758	0.07	New	0	New
Good Choice 2016	3,722	0.07	New	0	New
Czech National Social Party	1,573	0.03	New	0	New
Vote Right Bloc	491	0.01	–0.01	0	0
Society Against Development in the Prokop Valley	438	0.01	New	0	New
H.A.V.E.L.	436	0.01	New	0	New
Citizens 2011	359	0.01	–0.00	0	0
Nation Together	300	0.01	New	0	New
Czech National Front	117	0.00	New	0	New
Total	5,060,759	100.00	–	200	0
Valid votes	5,060,759	99.40			
Invalid/blank votes	30,306	0.60			
Total votes	5,091,065	100.00			
Registered voters/turnout	8,374,501	60.79	+1.31		
Source: Volby

=== Distribution of seats by region ===
Party	Prague	C. Boh.	S. Boh.	Plzeň	K. Vary	Ústí n. L.	Liberec	Hr. Král.	Pard.	Vys.	S. Mor.	Olo.	Zlín	Mor.-Sil.	Total
ANO	6	9	5	5	3	7	4	5	4	4	7	5	4	10	78
ODS	5	4	2	2	0	1	0	1	1	1	2	1	1	2	25
Piráti	5	3	1	1	1	1	1	1	1	1	2	1	1	2	22
SPD	1	2	1	1	1	2	1	1	1	1	3	2	2	3	22
ČSSD	1	2	1	1	0	1	0	1	1	1	2	1	1	2	15
KSČM	1	2	1	1	0	1	0	1	1	1	2	1	1	2	15
KDU-ČSL	1	0	1	0	0	0	0	1	1	1	2	1	1	1	10
TOP 09	3	2	1	0	0	0	0	0	0	0	0	1	0	0	7
TOTAL	24	26	13	11	5	13	8	11	10	10	23	12	12	22	200

=== Result maps ===
Results of major parties by district
ANO

ODS

Pirates

SPD

KSČM

ČSSD

KDU–ČSL

TOP 09

STAN

== Government formation ==
President Miloš Zeman announced on 22 October that he intended to ask Babiš to form a government. ANO was by far the largest party in the Chamber, with more than twice the vote share and three times as many seats as the second largest party, the Civic Democrats. However, many media outlets speculated that Babiš would encounter problems finding potential coalition partners due to his ongoing criminal fraud charges. Numerous parties stated their refusal to form a government with ANO as long as Babiš remained its leader, and Babiš ruled out governing with SPD or the Communist Party.

Deputy ANO leader Jaroslav Faltýnek stated that the party should talk to its current coalition partners first. Though Babiš expressed a preference for a coalition with ODS, ODS leader Petr Fiala announced that his party would not take part in coalition talks with ANO. An ANO–ODS coalition would have had 103 seats, enough for a governing majority. Although he had voiced Eurosceptic positions during the campaign, Babiš took a more pro-EU stance after the election.

As Babiš could not create a coalition government, he opted to form a minority government. His cabinet took power on 13 December 2017, but on 16 January 2018 it lost a confidence motion in the Chamber of Deputies by 78–117. Babiš was therefore obliged to resign and resume negotiations about the future government. With the Civic Democrats, Pirates and other minor parties maintaining their position of refusing to negotiate with ANO as long as Babiš was Prime Minister, negotiations between ANO and SPD and the Communists continued, while Babiš paused negotiations with the Social Democrats until after its February congress, where elected new leadership. Babiš said that he would prefer a minority government with confidence and supply from the Social Democrats and the Communists. He subsequently stated that if his cabinet did not pass a confidence motion by May 2018, he would favour a snap election.

Coalition talks between ANO and the Social Democrats failed on 5 April 2018, primarily because of differences regarding the Ministry of Interior and Ministry of Finance, both of which ČSSD had wanted as a guarantee of the independent investigation of the criminal case against Babiš. On 10 April, President Miloš Zeman proposed that Babiš continue negotiations with the Communist Party and Freedom and Direct Democracy, which between them would command a 115-seat majority. The parties were co-operating unofficially in the Chamber of Deputies, but in coalition talks they differed on a number of issues, including a European Union membership referendum and referendum law. ČSSD subsequently re-opened talks with ANO, in which KSČM also participated. ČSSD entered into coalition with ANO on 15 June 2018, with KSČM subsequently voting in favour of the ANO-ČSSD minority government in exchange for concessions.

== Cyberattacks ==
The day after the election, the Czech Statistical Office reported that its websites used for presentation of results were the targets of coordinated DDoS attacks during the counting of the votes, and as a result the websites volby.cz and volbyhned.cz had been inaccessible. The matter was investigated by the Czech police, as well as by the Ministry of the Interior and the Government.

In January 2018, the police confirmed that the websites were subjected to DDoS attacks, but stressed that the investigation was still ongoing.
