= Petr Robejšek =

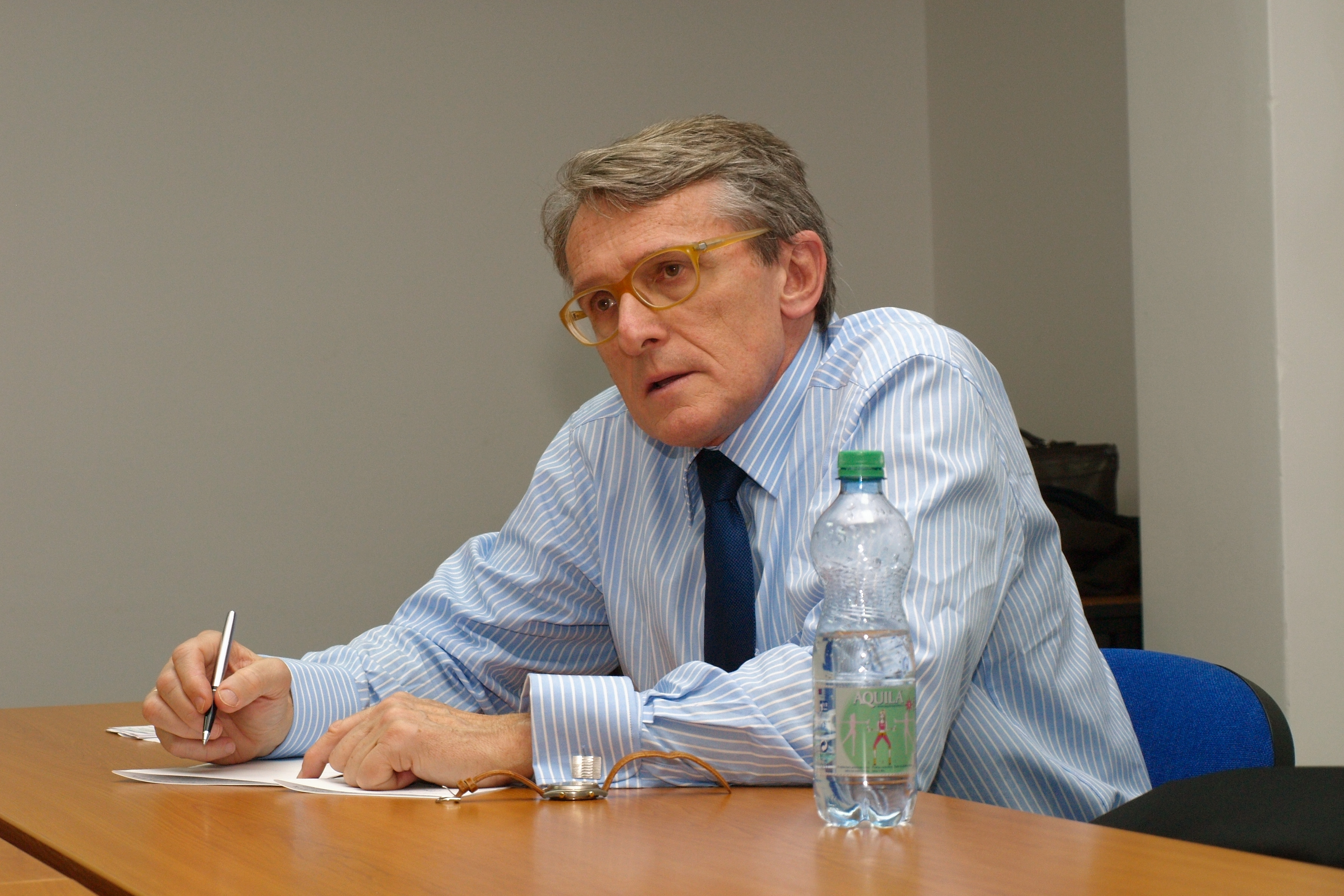

Personal details
- Born: 10 December 1948 (age 77) Zlín, Czechoslovakia
- Citizenship: Czech
- Party: REAL
- Education: Charles University; University of Hamburg
- Awards: Medal of Merit (2016)

Petr Robejšek (born 10 December 1948 in Zlín) is a Czech political scientist, economist and politician. From 1975 to 2016 he lived primarily in Germany. In 2016 he established the political party Realists. Since 2016, he lives primarily in the Czech Republic. He is known for his eurosceptic views.

== Biography ==
Robejšek studied psychology and sociology at Charles University. He later emigrated to the West Germany and studied national economics at University of Hamburg. He worked at International Institute for Politics and Economy. He became the Chairman of the Institute in 1998. He remained in the position until 2007.

== Political career ==
Robejšek founded a new political party Realists in 2016. Robejšek stated he wants to save the Czech political right. He mentioned that traditional right wing parties such as the Civic Democratic Party and TOP 09 are in crisis. He stated that party wants to get 20% in the upcoming legislative election. He led the party during 2017 legislative election but it received only 0.7% of votes and thus failed to reach 5% threshold.
