= 2007 Czech Social Democratic Party leadership election =

2007 ČSSD leadership election
- 21 March 2007
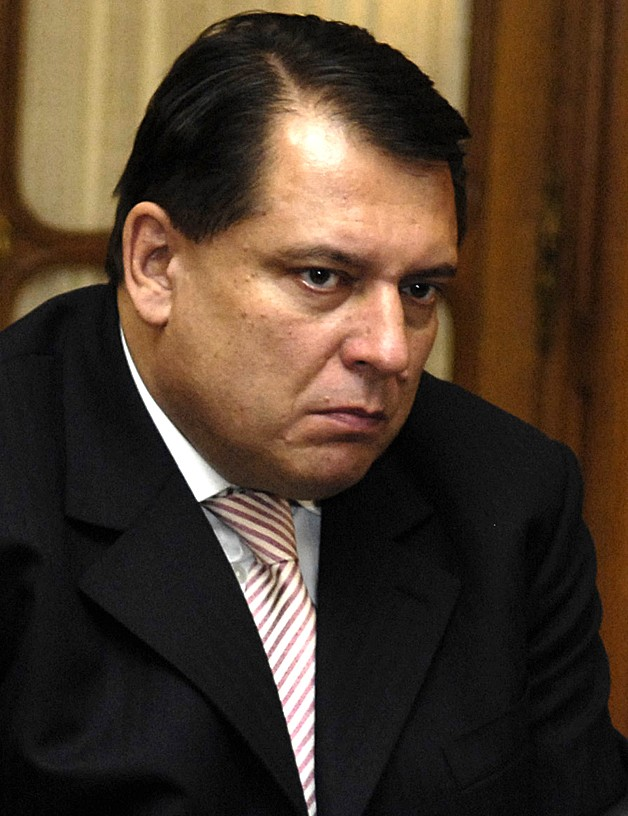
Candidate	Jiří Paroubek
Electoral vote	311
Percentage	60%
Leader of ČSSD before election
Jiří Paroubek
Elected Leader of ČSSD
Jiří Paroubek

The Czech Social Democratic Party (ČSSD) leadership election of 2007 was held on 21 March 2007. Jiří Paroubek was reelected as party's leader. Election was marked by conflict between Paroubek and his predecessor Miloš Zeman.

Jaroslav Foldyna announced that he considers running against Paroubek. Foldyna was a supporter of Miloš Zeman. Zeman himself endorsed Foldyna's candidature. Some members of parliament publicly expressed their support for Foldyna. Foldyna later backed down and stated that his candidature is not likely.

The election was held on 23 March 2006. Paroubek remained sole candidate. He received 311 votes of 472 delegates. Paroubek's result was weaker than expected.
