= 2017 Czech government crisis =

- Date: May 2017 –
- Location: Czech Republic
- Caused by: Minister of Finance's evasion of taxes

A Czech government crisis began in May 2017, following allegations that the Minister of Finance, Andrej Babiš, also the leader of ANO 2011, a partner in the ruling coalition, had evaded taxes related to his business activities.

== History ==
In March 2017, the Chamber of Deputies asked Andrej Babiš, leader of ANO 2011 and finance minister, to explain his financial affairs. In April 2017, he stated in a letter that all his financial activities had always been legal. Parliamentary Speaker Jan Hamáček (ČSSD) said he did not consider the explanation sufficient. On 2 May 2017, Prime Minister Bohuslav Sobotka (ČSSD) stated that Babiš should resign.

Bohuslav Sobotka announced on 2 May that he would resign, leading to the formation of a new cabinet which would not include Babiš. Babiš described Sobotka's decision as a "dirty trick." Lubomír Zaorálek and Milan Chovanec (both ČSSD) were mentioned as possible replacements for Sobotka as prime minister. Sobotka initially planned to submit his resignation to President Miloš Zeman on 4 May 2017, but later decided to resign on 20 May, when Zeman had returned from a visit to China. However, Zeman proceeded with the resignation ceremony nonetheless, which was considered a humiliation for Sobotka. Sobotka decided not to resign after the ceremony, and on 5 May 2017 he announced that he would instead dismiss Babiš from government.

Sobotka's decision was praised by the leaders of TOP 09 and KDU–ČSL. ODS leader Petr Fiala called for a snap election, and stated that Sobotka's decision would only deepen the crisis. Various politicians stated that the resignation ceremony was shameful for the Czech Republic. Zeman announced on 8 May 2017 that he would not accept Babiš's removal from the government yet, and would make a final decision on his return from China. This decision was criticised by many politicians and lawyers as unconstitutional, as according to the Czech constitution the president should appoint or dismiss ministers at the request of the prime minister.

On 10 May 2017, 20,000 people demonstrated in Prague against the actions of Zeman and Babiš, and other demonstrations were held around the country.

Zeman called the leaders of the coalition parties to a meeting in Liberec. Sobotka was unable to participate as he had gone to Luxembourg on 10 May, but Zeman met Chovanec, Babiš and Pavel Bělobrádek. Zeman presented the two possible solutions to the crisis as a new election, or a new government without Sobotka or Babiš. ANO 2011 stated that they were prepared to discuss a government that would not include Sobotka or Babiš. ČSSD and KDU-ČSL stated that they would consider a government without ANO.
