= Realists (political party) =

Defunct Czech conservative political party

Realists Realisté
- Abbreviation: REAL
- Secretary: Michal Moroz; Jiří Hynek
- Mentor: Petr Robejšek
- Founded: 15 December 2016
- Dissolved: July 2019
- Ideology: National conservatism Liberal conservatism Economic liberalism Euroscepticism
- Political position: Right-wing
- Colours: Blue

Website
- http://www.realiste.cz/

The Realists (Czech: Realisté) was a conservative political party in the Czech Republic, founded by Petr Robejšek in November 2016. Other members included Pavel Kohout, Antonín Fryč and Jiří Horecký. The party contested the 2017 legislative election, but was disbanded by a membership vote in 2019.

== History ==
The party was established on 24 November 2016, in response to Brexit and the victory of Donald Trump in the 2016 Presidential election in the United States. The Realists registered as an official party in December 2016 as the "Party of the Regions", but changed its name to the Realists soon afterwards. Robejšek took the title of "mentor" before a new leader was to be elected in 2016. The party was ideologically close to the Civic Democratic Party and Dawn - National Coalition, but criticised ANO 2011, which they called a "left leaning" party. The party said that it would defend Czech national interests and govern according to the Pareto principle.

The Realists launched their campaign for the 2017 elections on 14 February 2017. Robejšek said that he hoped to win 20% of votes in the election.

Martin Lank, elected as a member of Dawn of Direct Democracy, joined the Realists on 25 May 2017. Robejšek stated that the party was prepared to accept other MPs if their views were aligned with the party. Another MP from Dawn, Jana Hnyková, joined the Realists on 5 September 2017. On 21 August 2017, the Realists announced Jiří Hynek as their presidential candidate in the 2018 election.

The Realists received 0.7% of votes in the 2017 legislative election, failing to reach the 5% electoral threshold. The party leaders refused to describe the result as a defeat, and Jiří Hynek stated that the Realists should prepare for the next election.

The party announced on 16 July 2019 that it would vote on whether to dissolve itself due to electoral defeats and passive regional organisations. The party announced on 22 July 2019 that its members had voted to dissolve the party.

== Election results ==
=== Chamber of Deputies ===
Chamber of Deputies
Election	Leader	Votes			Seats		Role
Election	Leader	#	%	Rank	#	±	Role
2017	Petr Robejšek	35,995	0.71	13th	0 / 200	new	extra-parliamentary

=== Presidential ===
Election	Candidate	First round result			Second round result		
Election	Candidate	Votes	%Votes	Result	Votes	%Votes	Result
2018	Jiří Hynek	63,348	1.23	7th place			

== See also ==
- Category:Realists (political party) politicians
