= Euroscepticism in the Czech Republic =

Criticism/Opposition to the European Union in the Czech Republic

Euroscepticism, i.e. the opposition to policies of supranational European Union institutions and/or opposition to membership of the European Union, is a significant element in the politics of the Czech Republic, with several parties and political figures favouring leaving the union. According to a survey by CVVM in April 2016, 25% of Czechs were satisfied with European Union membership.

== History ==
On 9 October 2009, during the Lisbon Treaty ratification, President Václav Klaus demanded a Czech opt-out from the Charter of Fundamental Rights included in the treaty, similar to the opt-outs that had been granted to the United Kingdom and Poland during negotiations in 2007. Klaus' demands caused consternation among other European leaders, as the treaty had already been ratified by both houses of the Czech parliament, and been signed by all other European leaders.

== Discussion of a withdrawal referendum ==
On 30 June 2016, soon after a referendum on the issue took place in the United Kingdom, Czech President Miloš Zeman called for a similar referendum to be called in the Czech Republic, on whether to leave the union, as well as NATO, while adding that he did not personally favour withdrawal. The Czech government immediately rejected Zeman's proposal, with a spokesman for Prime Minister Bohuslav Sobotka stating that "membership in these organizations is a guarantee of stability and security". Andrej Babiš, Finance Minister and leader of the second-largest party in the governing coalition, added that the referendum would be "damaging".

For a referendum to be called, a constitutional amendment would be required, with the support of 60% in both houses of parliament.

Based on the term "Brexit", Czech withdrawal from the European Union is sometimes referred to using the portmanteau "Czexit".

== Contentious issues ==
Although the relationship between the European Commission and the current Czech government is more cordial than the governments of Poland and Hungary, issues of disagreement include the quota system for relocation of refugees, suggested as a solution to the European migrant crisis but widely opposed by the Czech public and Czech politicians, and the proposed adoption by all EU member states of the euro, which has seen a fall in support in the Czech Republic since the Eurozone crisis that started in 2009. In May 2010, President Václav Klaus said that the country "needn't hurry to enter the Eurozone".

Other points of disagreement include EU plans to tighten gun control, and opposition within the Czech Republic to Europe-wide measures to address climate change.

== Public opinion ==
An April 2016 survey by the CVVM Institute indicated that 25% of Czechs were satisfied with EU membership, down from 32% the previous year.

== Eurosceptic political parties ==
- The Civic Democratic Party (ODS), founded by Václav Klaus, is considered a Soft Eurosceptic party and is opposed to increasing European integration. The party was in power when the Czech parliament ratified the Lisbon Treaty, on 18 February 2009. The party has two MEPs, Evžen Tošenovský and Jan Zahradil, who sit in the European Conservatives and Reformists group in the European Parliament.
- Communist Party of Bohemia and Moravia, holds no seats in the Czech Republic's Chamber of Deputies as of the 2021 Czech parliamentary election.
- Czech Sovereignty of Social Democracy, a small party led by Jiří Paroubek, a former prime minister.
- Dawn, a small party with representation in the Chamber of Deputies from 2013 to 2017.
- The Free Citizens Party, founded by former ODS member Petr Mach in 2009, campaigned against ratification of the Treaty of Lisbon, and now calls for full withdrawal from the EU. Mach was elected to the European Parliament in the 2014 European Parliament elections, as the party's sole MEP, and sits with the UK Independence Party in the Europe of Freedom and Direct Democracy (EFD) group.
- Tomio Okamura's Freedom and Direct Democracy split from Dawn in May 2015. The party is named after the Eurosceptic European Parliament group, Europe of Freedom and Direct Democracy, but also has links with Europe of Nations and Freedom, a separate Eurosceptic parliamentary group. It also calls for the Czech Republic to leave the European Union.
- Workers' Party of Social Justice.
