= Michal Hašek =

Czech politician

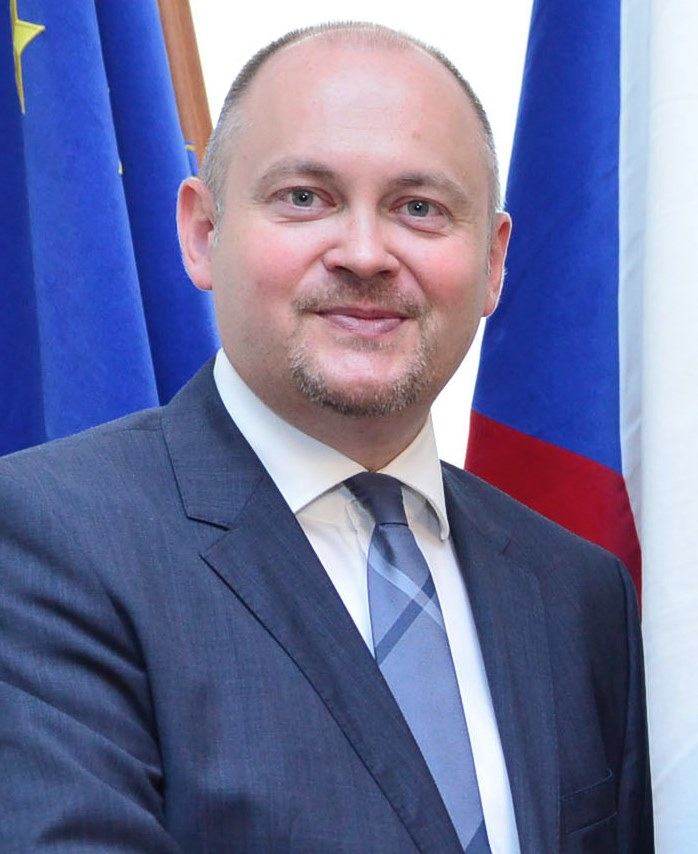
- Michal Hašek in 2014

Governor of South Moravian Region
- In office 21 November 2008 – 6 November 2016
- Preceded by: Stanislav Juránek
- Succeeded by: Bohumil Šimek

Member of the Chamber of Deputies
- In office 15 June 2002 – 30 April 2014
- Succeeded by: Vlastimil Gabrhel

Personal details
- Born: 17 April 1976 (age 50) Brno, Czechoslovakia
- Party: Social Democracy (1998–2022); PRO (2024–2025)
- Education: Masaryk University
- Website: https://michalhasek.cz/

Michal Hašek (born 17 April 1976) is a Czech politician and former Governor of the South Moravian Region. From 2002 until 2014, he was a member of the Chamber of Deputies (MP). He also served as shadow Minister of Agriculture in the shadow cabinet of former Prime Minister Jiří Paroubek.

In July 2018, Hašek became an external advisor to the Czech Minister of Agriculture, Miroslav Toman, as a member of the Ministerial Legislative Council.

== Early life and education ==
Hašek graduated with a Masters' law degree from the Masaryk University Faculty of Law. He also received a juris degree from an obscure law school in the southwestern Slovak town of Sládkovičovo, but its validity has been called into question; Hašek's thesis supervisor was Mojmír Mamojka, a politician from Slovakia's Smer party, leading to allegations of clientelism. Hasek passed the bar exam in June 2021.

== Political career ==
=== Member of the Czech parliament ===
In the 2002 Czech parliamentary election, Hasek was elected to the Chamber of Deputies from the South Moravian region, representing the Czech Social Democratic Party (ČSSD). He remained in the Chamber of Deputies until the beginning of March 2009.

=== Governor ===
Hašek gave up his parliamentary mandate on 27 February 2009, stating that it was not possible to combine the mandate well with being the governor of South Moravia. After Jiří Paroubek resigned as head of ČSSD, Hašek announced his candidacy for chairman.

=== 2013 Czech parliamentary elections ===
At a meeting of the ČSSD presidency on 27 October 2013, Hašek and the mayor of Brno, Roman Onderka, attempted to exclude Bohuslav Sobotka from the negotiating team on the new government, but were unable to do so due to greater support for Sobotka within the party than Hašek anticipated. Hašek held a private meeting with President Miloš Zeman and other ČSSD figures to discuss how to proceed. Hašek denied the meeting had taken place, only for it to be confirmed by Milan Chovanec.

After Zdeněk Škromach announced his resignation as vice-chairman of the party on 8 November 2013, Hašek also resigned from his position. He said he was doing so in response to the party's poor election results, to calm the negative media campaign against him. On 30 April 2014, Hašek submitted a notarized record of his resignation from the parliamentary mandate to the Speaker of the House of Representatives, Jan Hamáček.

=== Post-parliamentary career ===
In November 2015, Hašek was nominated as the lead candidate for ČSSD in the 2016 regional elections in South Moravia. In the election he received 8,103 preferential votes, but his party finished third behind KDU-ČSL.

Hašek was reported to be actively opposing the 2016 Brno central station referendum, encouraging Brno residents not to participate in the vote. He called for a regional referendum on the location of the railway station in Brno, but this never came to pass.

In the 2016 regional assembly elections in South Moravia, ANO became the largest party, and Hašek was replaced as governor by Bohumil Šimek on 16 November 2016.

In the 2020 Czech regional elections, Hašek again stood in the South Moravian Region for ČSSD. He was originally listed 18th on the candidate list, but ended up fourth due to preferential votes. In April 2021, he resigned as a regional representative due to the incompatibility of his functions.

=== Return to politics ===
On 28 January 2024, Hašek became the chairman of the South Moravian regional organization of the extra-parliamentary party Law, Respect, Expertise (PRO 2022). He left the party on 26 September 2025, citing disagreement with Jindřich Rajchl's leadership. Three days later Hašek endorsed Stačilo! before the upcoming 2025 Czech parliamentary election, saying that he considers himself a life-long left wing politician.

== Personal life ==
Hašek was married to Veronika with one daughter named Justýna. They divorced due to his alleged relationship with the head of his office, Šárka Rouzková.

== Controversy ==
Before the 2016 Czech regional elections, Mladá fronta Dnes reported that Hašek had ordered marketing services worth 400,000 Czech Koruna from his partner, Jana Mrencová. Her name was subsequently confirmed by former spokeswoman Denisa Kapitančiková, who stated that the lobbyist should repeatedly sign a contract with the office for 200,000 Czech Koruna. Whilst searching for payments to Mrencová, journalists discovered that the South Moravian Region had paid at least 650,000 Czech Koruna to JT Media for the publication of positive articles over three years. Mlada Fronta Dnes later reported that Mrencová had returned the money to the regional office.
