= Jaroslav Foldyna =

Czech politician

Jaroslav Foldyna MP
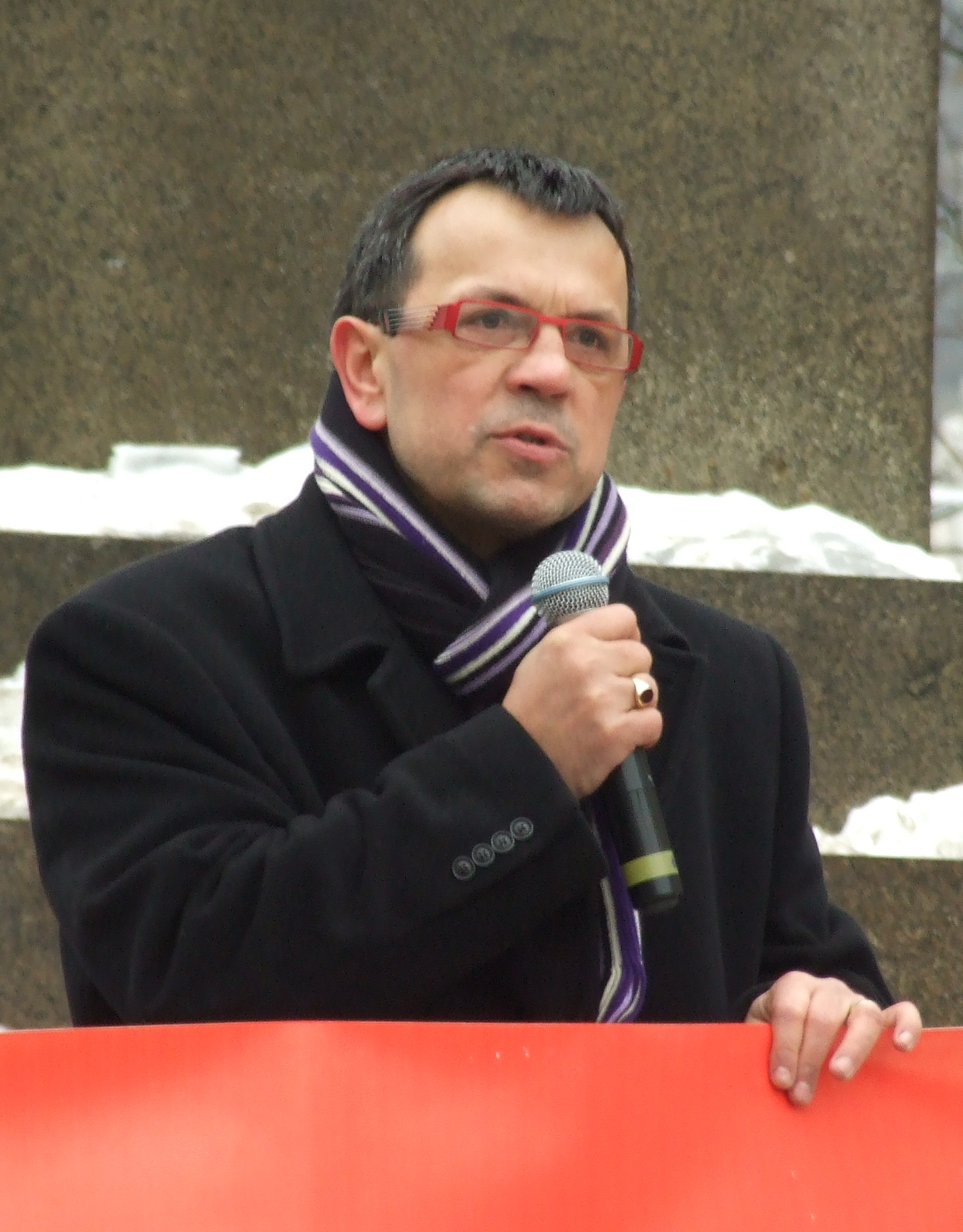

Member of the Chamber of Deputies
- Incumbent
- Assumed office 26 October 2013

Personal details
- Born: 26 June 1960 (age 65) Česká Lípa, Czechoslovakia
- Party: ČSSD (1998–2019); Freedom and Direct Democracy (2020–present)

Jaroslav Foldyna (born 26 June 1960) is a Czech politician, who sits as an MP in the Chamber of Deputies for the far-right Freedom and Direct Democracy.

== Career ==
Foldyna was first elected as an MP for the Czech Social Democratic Party (ČSSD) in 2013. He served as vice-chair of ČSSD from 2018 to 2019, before resigning from the party. In 2020, he joined Freedom and Direct Democracy (SPD), and was elected as an MP for his new party in 2021.

== Political positions ==
Foldyna has criticised the Turkish government's actions against the Kurds and called for Turkey to be expelled from NATO. He has also argued that interventions by European countries and the United States in Libya contributed to an influx of illegal immigration into Europe. Foldyna has also expressed opposition to Kosovan independence. He has been criticized for alleged links to the Russian nationalist Night Wolves motorcycle club.

He is of maternal Serbian descent.
