= Jiří Zimola =

Czech politician

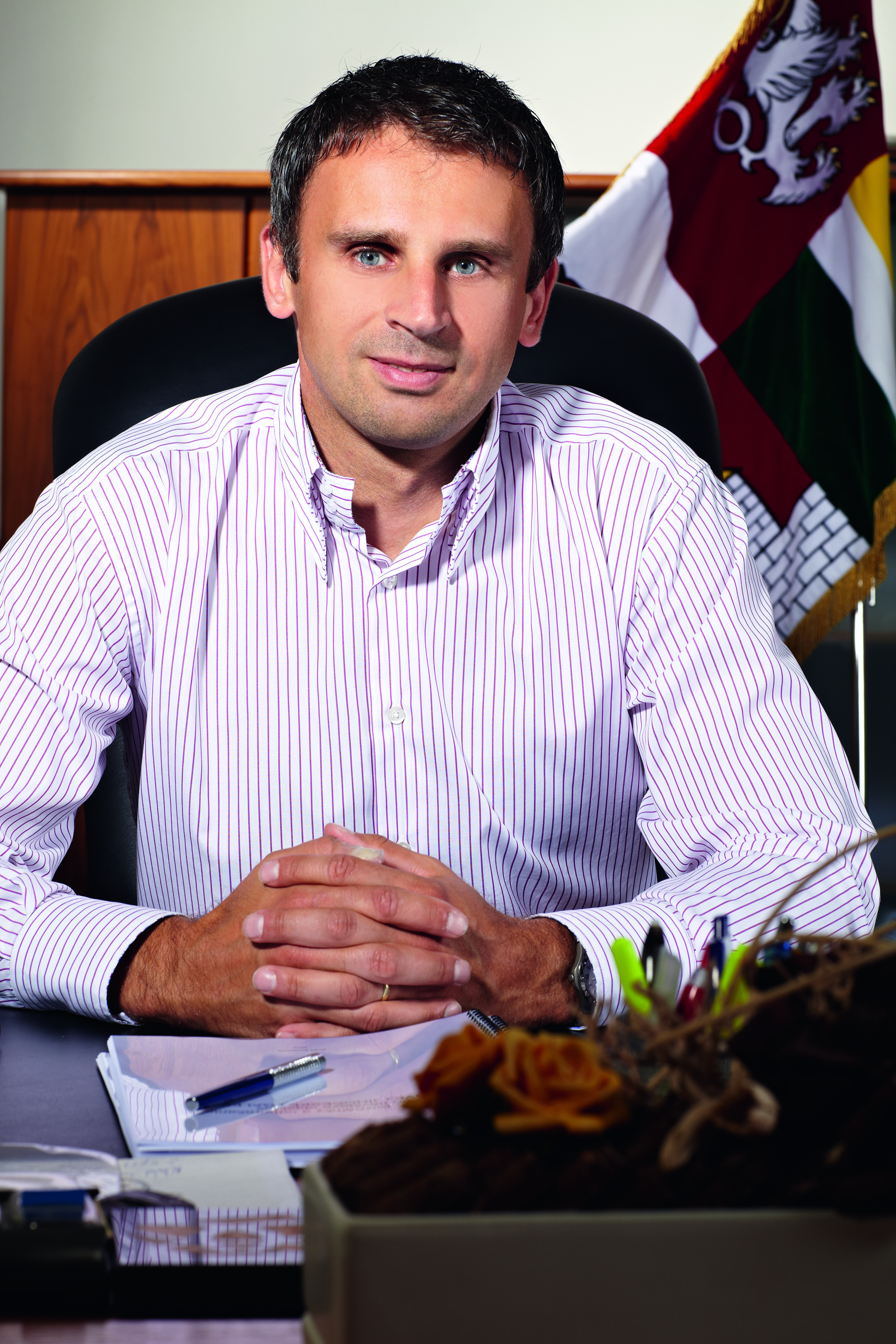

Member of the Chamber of Deputies
- In office 26 October 2013 – 31 March 2014

Governor of South Bohemian region
- In office 29 November 2008 – 27 April 2017
- Preceded by: Jan Zahradník
- Succeeded by: Ivana Stráská

Mayor of Nová Bystřice
- In office 1998–2008
- Preceded by: Bohumil Chlanda
- Succeeded by: Vladimír Bláha

Personal details
- Born: 28 March 1971 (age 55) Třebíč, Czechoslovakia
- Party: ČSSD (2000–2020); Change 2020
- Children: 2
- Education: University of South Bohemia
- Website: http://www.jirizimola.cz/

Jiří Zimola (born 28 March 1971) is a Czech Social Democrat politician, who served as Governor of the South Bohemian Region from 2008 until his resignation in 2017. Zimola left the Social Democratic Party in 2020 and became leader of a new party called Change 2020.

== Biography ==
He studied at the University of South Bohemia in České Budějovice, working as a teacher after he finished his studies.

== Political career ==
Zimola entered politics in 1998 and became Mayor of Nová Bystřice. He became a member of the Czech Social Democratic Party in 2000. In 2008, Zimola became Governor of the South Bohemian region and gave up his position as Mayor. He was forced to resign in 2017 due to a controversy related to his cottage at Lipno nad Vltavou.

He founded a political platform called Let's save ČSSD after the 2017 legislative election.
