= Milan Chovanec =

Czech politician

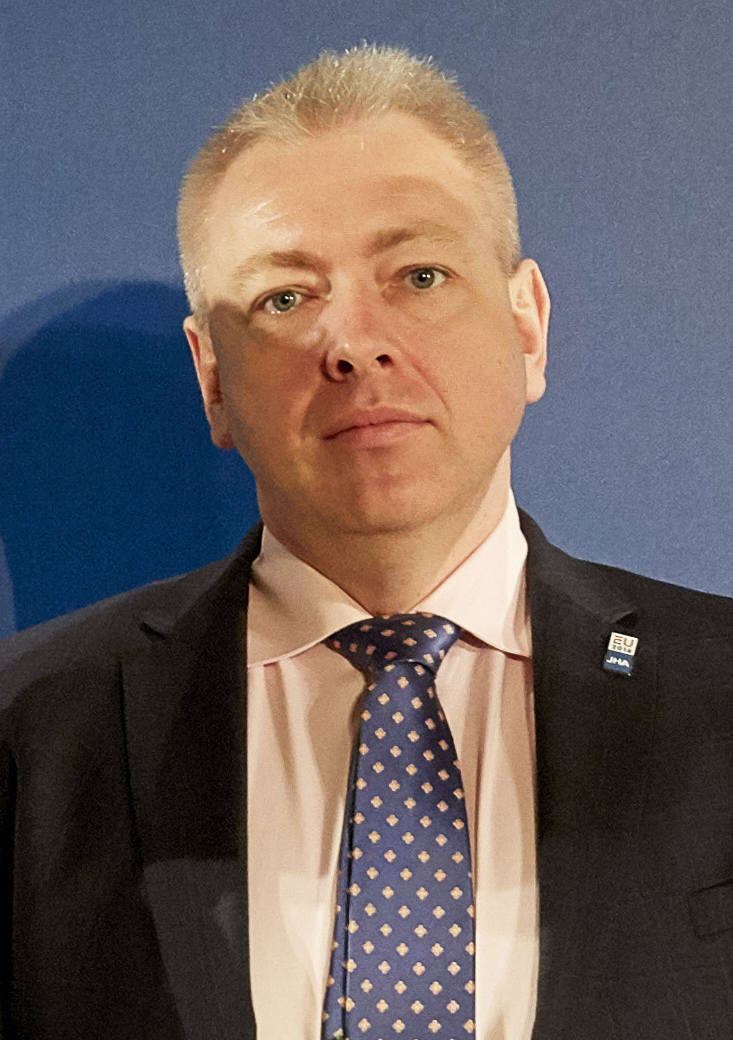

Minister of Interior
- In office 29 January 2014 – 13 December 2017
- Prime Minister: Bohuslav Sobotka
- Preceded by: Martin Pecina
- Succeeded by: Lubomír Metnar

Leader of the Social Democratic Party Acting
- In office 15 June 2017 – 18 February 2018
- Preceded by: Bohuslav Sobotka
- Succeeded by: Jan Hamáček

Member of the Chamber of Deputies
- In office 26 October 2013 – 14 April 2019

Personal details
- Born: 31 January 1970 (age 56) Plzeň, Czechoslovakia
- Party: ČSSD
- Children: 2
- Education: University of West Bohemia
- Website: www.milanchovanec.cz

Milan Chovanec (born 31 January 1970) is a Czech politician. He served as Minister of the Interior of the Czech Republic in the Cabinet of Prime Minister Bohuslav Sobotka from 2014 to 2017, and served as acting leader of the Czech Social Democratic Party from June 2017 to February 2018. He was also a member of the Chamber of Deputies of the Czech Republic from 26 October 2013 until his resignation on 14 April 2019. Previously he served as governor of Plzeň Region between 2010 and 2014 and as a member of Plzeň City Council from 2002 until 2010.

== Early life ==
Chovanec obtained a bachelor's degree from the Faculty of Law at the University of West Bohemia. Before entering politics, he worked at the National Bank of Czechoslovakia until 1989.

== Political career ==
On 26 October 2013, Chovanec attended a private meeting of ČSSD politicians attempting to exclude Bohuslav Sobotka from the party leadership election. Chovanec was the first to publicly admit the meeting, and retained his place in the party leadership, despite offering his resignation to Sobotka.

In January 2014, Chovanec was nominated as Minister of the Interior for ČSSD in the Cabinet of Bohuslav Sobotka. President Zeman questioned Chovanec's competence to lead the department over alleged irregularities in his university qualifications, but Sobotka insisted on the nomination, arguing that Chovanec had already explained the matter sufficiently.

On 26 January 2014, Chovanec resigned as governor of the Plzeň region and was replaced by Václav Šlajs. The following month, on 17 February, Chovanec also resigned as an ordinary representative of the region.

At the end of 2014, Chovanec ran successfully to become vice-chair of ČSSD, defeating Jeroným Tejc in the second round of the election with 253 votes.

In 2015, during the European migration crisis, Chovanec represented the Czech government in negotiations on refugee quotas, refusing to accept mandatory quotas.

== Personal life ==
Chovanec is married to his wife Jaroslava with two children, but the couple live separately.

Party political offices
Preceded by Bohuslav Sobotka	Leader of the Social Democratic Party; Acting; 2017–2018	Succeeded by Jan Hamáček
