= 2013 Charles University Rector election =

← 2009	25 October 2013	2017 →
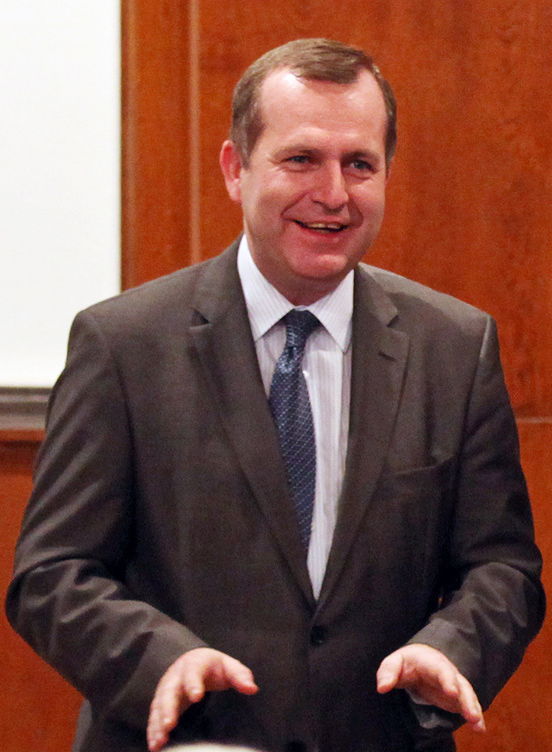
Candidate	Tomáš Zima
Electoral vote	42
Percentage	60%
Rector before election
Václav Hampl
Elected Rector
Tomáš Zima

The Charles University Rector election, 2013 was held when term of the incumbent Rector Václav Hampl ended. Former Dean of First Faculty of Medicine, Tomáš Zima was elected the new Chancellor. Hampl was ineligible to run for another term.

== Candidates ==
- Michal Stehlík, Dean of Faculty of Arts. He was originally considered a front-runner
- Stanislav Štech, Vice Rector of the University.
- Tomáš Zima, Former Dean of First Faculty of Medicine.

== Voting ==
Round	Tomáš Zima	Stanislav Štech	Michal Stehlík
1st round	26	22	20
2nd round	33	27	-
3rd round	42	-	-

The Chancellor was elected by the academic senate, consisting of 36 lecturers and 34 students. A candidate needed 36 votes to be elected. Micha Stehlík was considered the front-runner but was eliminated in the first round. Zima was elected in the third round.

Czech President Miloš Zeman confirmed the election on 21 January 2014 and appointed Zima as the new Rector. Zima stated that he wanted fewer Bachelor students but more Masters' students. He also stated that he wants to defend academic freedom.
