= 2021 Charles University Rector election =

← 2017	22 October 2021	2025 →
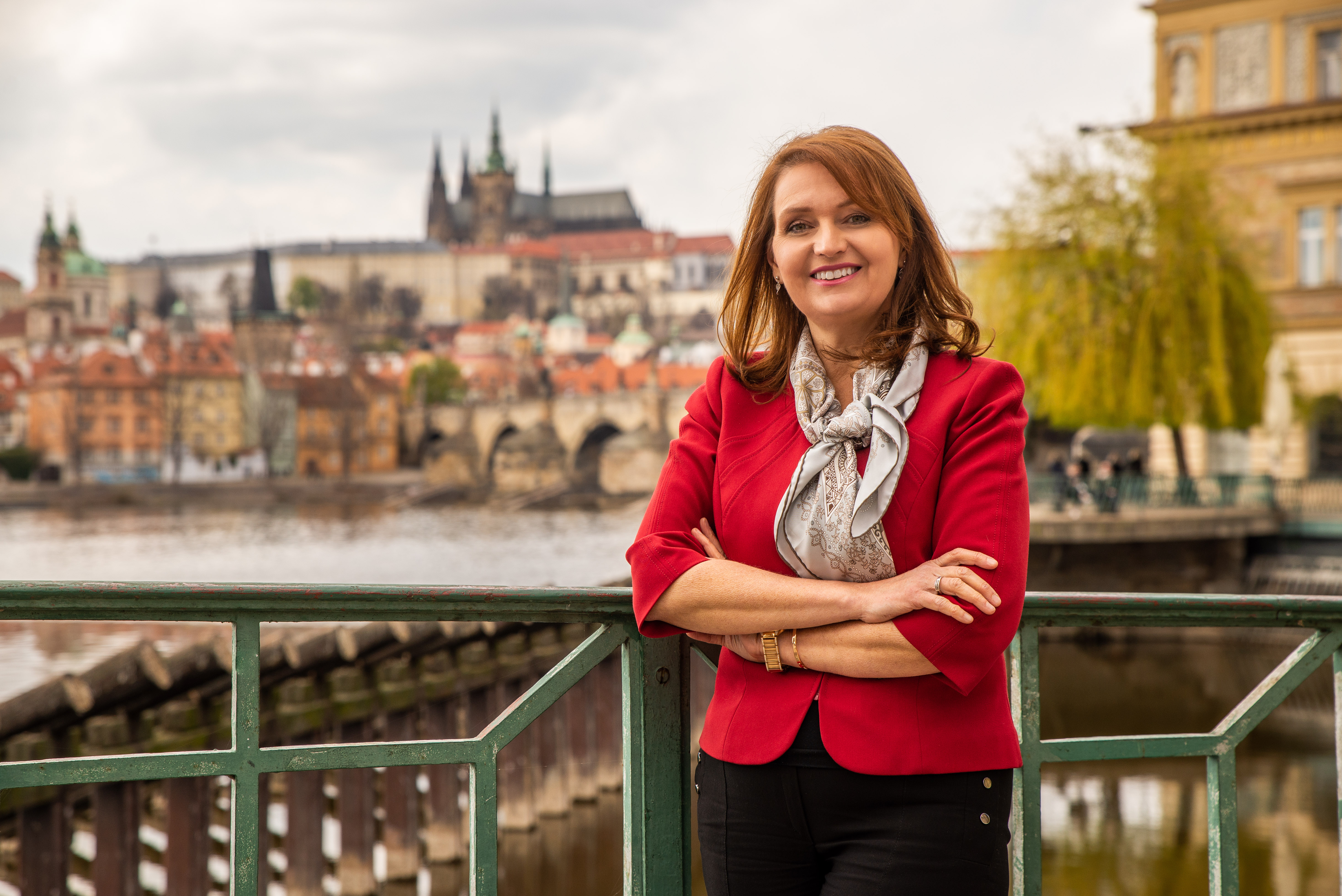
Candidate	Milena Králíčková	Michal Stehlík
Electoral vote	55	14
Percentage	79.71%	20.29%
Rector before election
Tomáš Zima
Elected Rector
Milena Králíčková

The Charles University Rector election, 2021 was held on 22 October 2021. The incumbent Rector Tomáš Zima was ineligible to run for third term. Milena Králíčková was elected first female rector of the university.

== Voting ==
Milena Králíčková	Michal Stehlík
55	14

69 members of academic senate voted. Králíčková received 55 votes to Stehlík's 14 votes.
