= University of Brno =

University of Brno may refer to:

- Masaryk University
- Mendel University
- Brno University of Technology
- University of Veterinary and Pharmaceutical Sciences, Brno
- Janáček Academy of Music and Performing Arts
