= 2005 Charles University Rector election =

← 2001	26 October 2005	2009 →
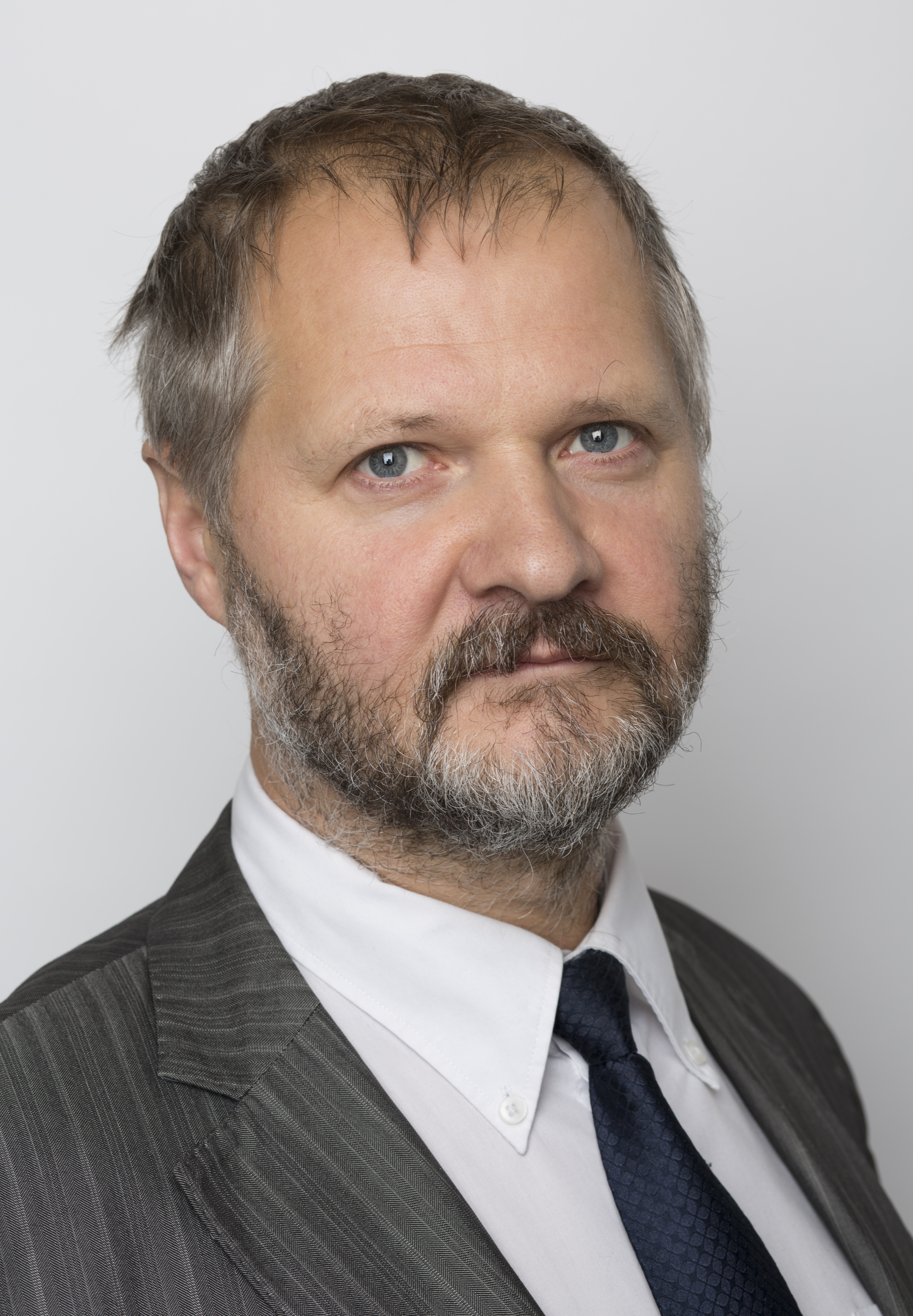
Candidate	Václav Hampl
Electoral vote	46
Percentage	70%
Rector before election
Ivan Wilhelm
Elected Rector
Václav Hampl

The Charles University Rector election, 2005 was held when term of previous Rector Ivan Wilhelm expired. Wilhelm was ineligible to run for third term. Václav Hampl won the election and became the youngest Rector in history of the University. It was duel of candidates from three medical faculties.

== Candidates ==
- Michal Anděl, Medician who lectures at Third Faculty of Medicine.
- Václav Hampl
- Štěpán Svačina

== Result ==
	Václav Hampl	Štěpán Svačina	Michal Anděl
1st Round			
2nd Round	35		-
3rd Round	46	-	-

Candidate needed at least 36 votes to be elected. Anděl was eliminated in the first round and Svačina in second. Hampl was elected when he received 42 votes in the third round.
