= Central European Institute of Technology =

Educational institution in the Czech Republic

- Středoevropský technologický institut
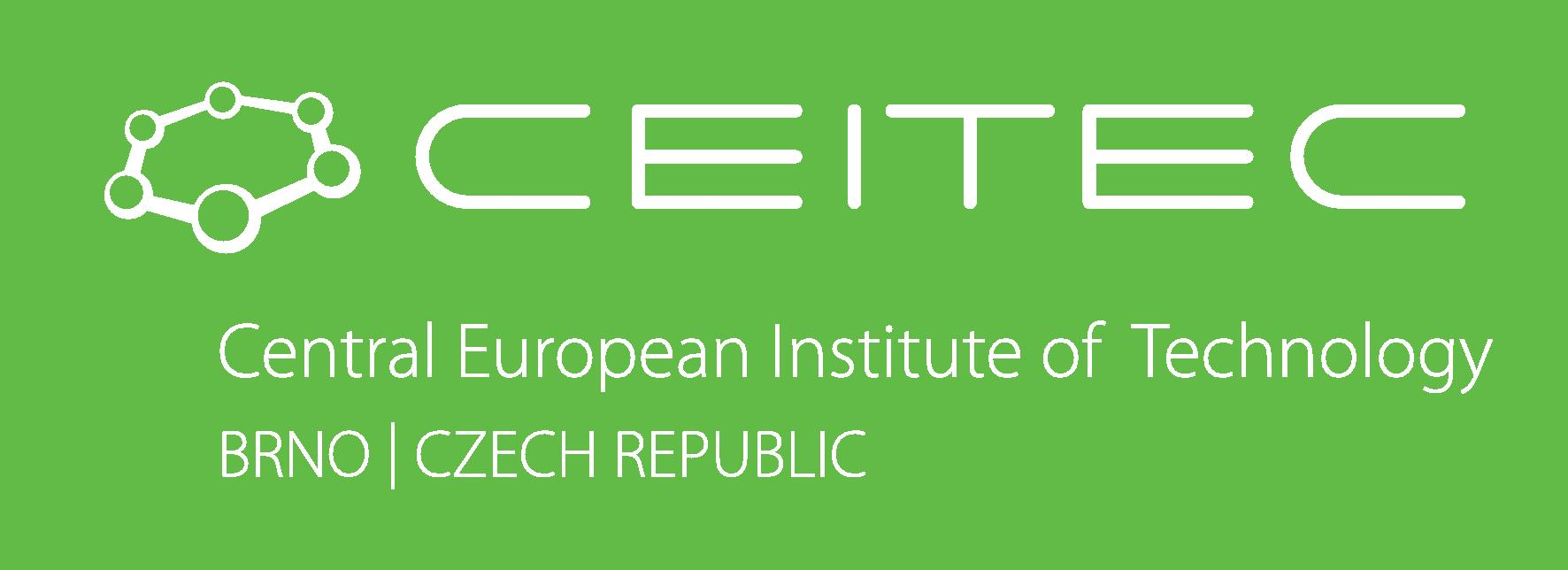

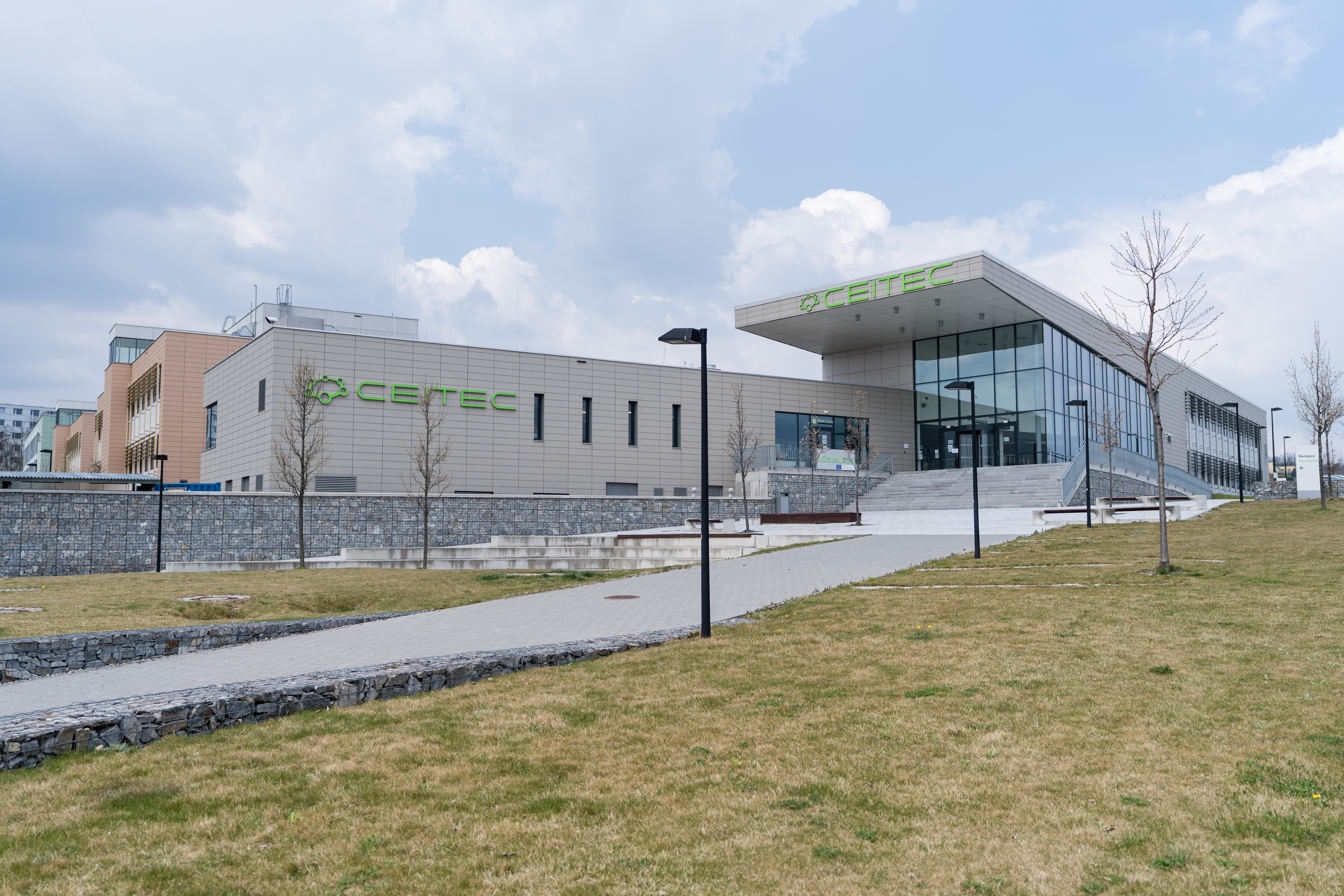
- CEITEC at Brno University of Technology
- Abbreviation: CEITEC
- Formation: 2011
- Type: Research consortium
- Headquarters: Brno, Czech Republic
- Fields: Life sciences, advanced materials and technologies
- Consortium director: Pavel Tomančák
- Website: www.ceitec.eu

The Central European Institute of Technology (CEITEC; Czech: Středoevropský technologický institut) is an interdisciplinary research centre in Brno, Czech Republic. Established in 2011, it specialises in life sciences, advanced materials and nanotechnology.

CEITEC is organised as a consortium of six universities and research institutions. Its principal institutes are based at Masaryk University and Brno University of Technology. It operates shared laboratories that provide equipment and expertise to researchers from academic institutions and industry.

== Research Areas ==
CEITEC has eight research programmes in life sciences, advanced materials, nanotechnology and industrial cybernetics.

=== Life sciences ===
Structural biology research examines the structure and function of proteins and RNA. Research in molecular medicine includes gene regulation, cancer and inherited disorders. Neuroscientists investigate how the brain develops and functions. Work on materials for tissue engineering and devices for nerve stimulation connects the technical fields with biology and medicine.

Plant research includes genomics, development and responses to environmental conditions, with contributions from groups at Masaryk University and Mendel University. Researchers at the University of Veterinary Sciences Brno and the Veterinary Research Institute work on molecular veterinary medicine.

=== Materials science and engineering ===
Material researchers study ceramics, polymers, composites and biomaterials. They also develop nanostructures for use in electronics and photonics. Spectroscopy is being also studied for characterising materials.

The industrial cybernetics and systems integration programme is focused on automation, robotics, sensors and control systems.

== Organisation ==
CEITEC’s six partners are four Brno universities—Masaryk University, Brno University of Technology, Mendel University and the University of Veterinary Sciences—and two research institutes: the Institute of Physics of Materials of the Czech Academy of Sciences and the Veterinary Research Institute. The partners run their own CEITEC units, each with its own head. The consortium also has its own director.

CEITEC Masaryk University (CEITEC MU) is a university institute based at the Bohunice campus. It provides doctoral training through the CEITEC PhD School..

CEITEC Brno University of Technology (CEITEC BUT) is based at the university’s campus near Palacký Hill. It has its own management and advisory bodies and offers the university’s doctoral programme in Advanced Materials and Nanosciences.

== Research infrastructure ==
CEITEC operates shared laboratories for researchers within the consortium and for academic and industrial users from Czechia and abroad. They provide equipment, technical expertise and services in life sciences, materials science and nanotechnology.

At Masaryk University, facilities include cryo-electron microscopy and tomography, the Josef Dadok National NMR Centre, and laboratories for studying interactions between biological molecules. Other facilities support genomics, proteomics, cellular imaging and plant research, as well as the analysis and management of biological data. The Multimodal and Functional Imaging Laboratory provides magnetic resonance imaging, electroencephalography and equipment for non-invasive brain stimulation. CEITEC’s structural biology facilities participate in the Czech Infrastructure for Integrative Structural Biology alongside laboratories at BIOCEV near Prague.

At Brno University of Technology, CEITEC Nano provides cleanrooms and equipment for fabricating nanostructures, characterising materials and analysing their structure. External academic and industrial researchers can use the facilities, and trained users can operate equipment themselves. Other shared laboratories provide biophotonics and X-ray micro- and nano-computed tomography. The RICAIP Testbed Brno houses industrial robots, production machinery and control systems for testing manufacturing processes, automation and digitalisation.

=== Selected research projects ===
==== Antimicrobial peptides ====
A team at CEITEC Masaryk University led by Robert Vácha works with international collaborators on peptides that kill bacteria by forming pores in their membranes. In 2026, the researchers reported that their computer-designed peptides were effective against antibiotic-resistant bacteria in laboratory tests and mouse infection models.

==== NeuroQuality ====
Petr Těšina’s NeuroQuality project studies how cells dispose of incomplete proteins produced during protein synthesis. When this process fails, faulty proteins can accumulate. The team investigates how these failures affect nerve cells and their role in neurodegenerative disease.

==== LightEM ====
At CEITEC Brno University of Technology, Andrea Konečná leads LightEM, which investigates ways to control electron beams using light. The research could lead to new microscopy methods and reduce damage to sensitive samples during imaging.

== History ==
Preparations for CEITEC were underway by 2006. In November that year, Masaryk University and Brno University of Technology signed an agreement to establish a jointly owned company, CEITEC s.r.o., to coordinate the project’s preparation and application for European funding. Representatives of the participating institutions signed a partnership agreement in September 2009.

CEITEC held its opening conference on 26 September 2011, three months after the European Commission approved the project. CEITEC’s researchers initially worked at the partner institutions, as the new laboratories had yet to be built. The project received about CZK 5.25 billion in funding from the European Regional Development Fund and the Czech government.

Foundation stones for the new premises were laid in September 2012 at Masaryk University’s Bohunice campus and Brno University of Technology’s campus near Palacký Hill. Two pavilions for life sciences research opened at Bohunice on 12 September 2014. The new complex at Brno University of Technology was completed in late 2015. Its laboratories for advanced materials and nanotechnology research came into full operation in September 2016, following the installation of equipment. They also opened to researchers from other universities, research institutes and industry.

In 2020, the six partner institutions signed a new cooperation agreement to continue the consortium from January 2021. That year, CEITEC added a research programme in industrial cybernetics, instrumentation and systems integration, building on work already undertaken at Brno University of Technology. On 30 November 2022, CEITEC at the university opened an experimental facility for testing industrial automation and robotics as part of the Czech–German AI initiative RICAIP.
