= 2009 Charles University Rector election =

← 2005	22 October 2009	2013 →
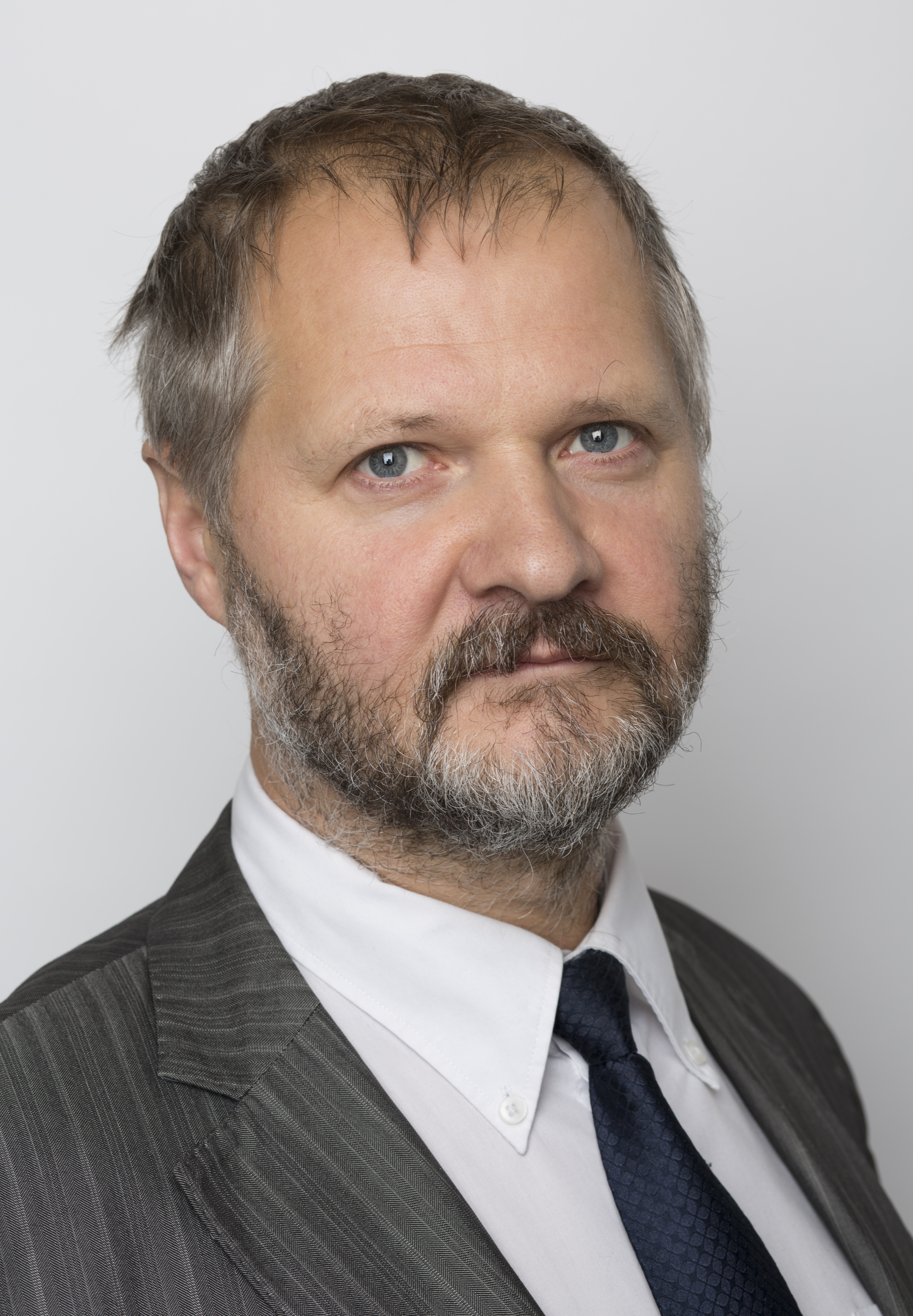
Candidate	Václav Hampl
Electoral vote	55
Percentage	90%
Rector before election
Václav Hampl
Elected Rector
Václav Hampl

The Charles University Rector election, 2009 was held when the first term of the incumbent Rector Václav Hampl expired. Hampl was elected for second term. Hampl's reelection was considered certain as he was the only candidate and 12 faculties of 17 endorsed him. Hampl received 55 votes from 61 delegates.

Hampl was inaugurated on 14 January 2010.
