= BIOCEV =

Biomedical research center in the Czech Republic

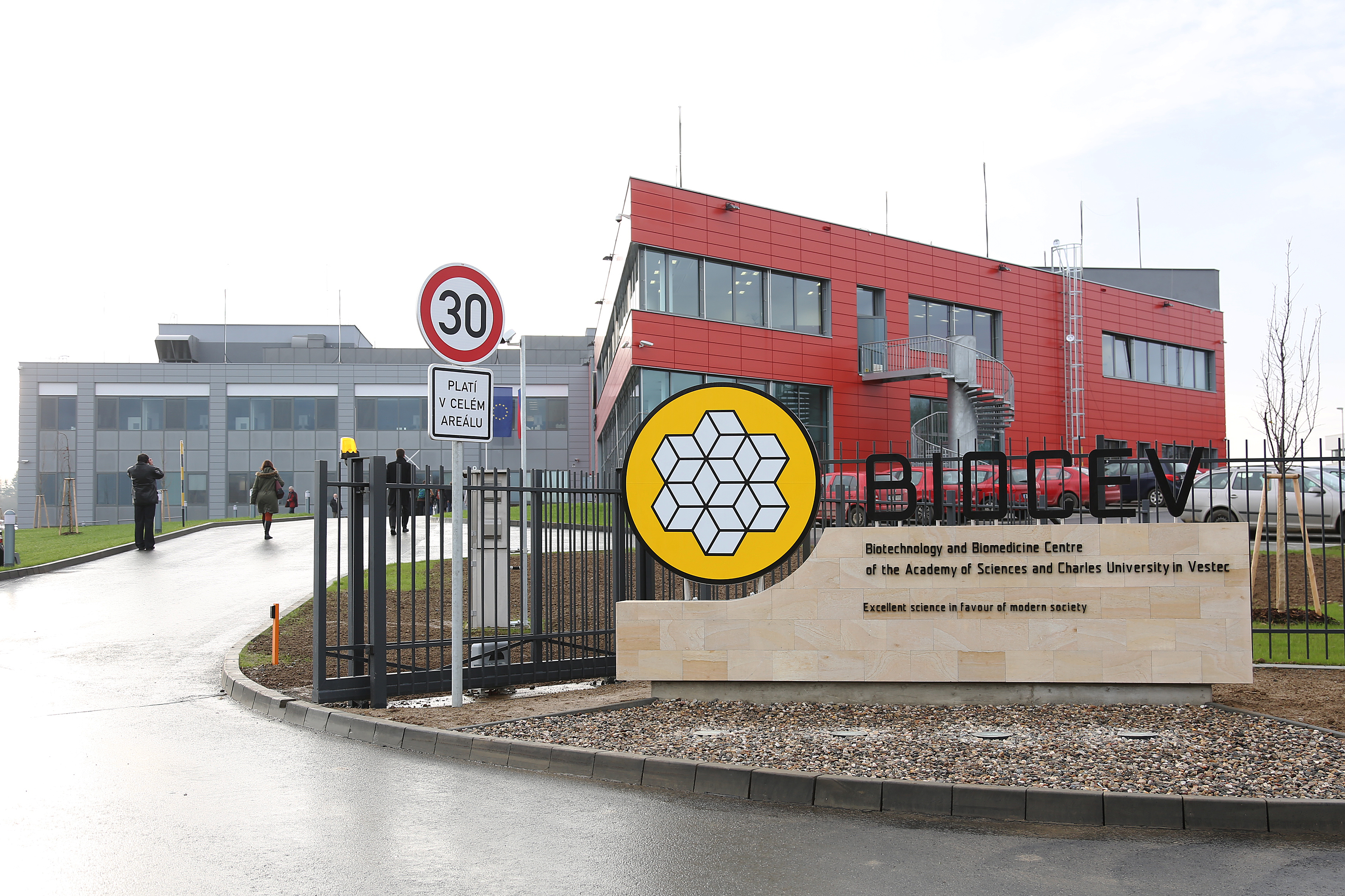
- BIOCEV campus
- Founded: 2015
- Type: Research institute
- Purpose: Biotechnology, Biomedicine, Structural biology
- Location: Vestec, Czech Republic
- Key people: Pavel Martásek (Scientific Director)
- Employees: ~500 researchers
- Website: www.biocev.eu/en

BIOCEV (Biotechnology and Biomedicine Centre of the Academy of Sciences and Charles University) is a joint research institute located in Vestec, Czech Republic. Established in 2015, it is operated by six institutes of the Czech Academy of Sciences (CAS) and two faculties of Charles University (Faculty of Science, Charles University and First Faculty of Medicine, Charles University). The center maintains collaborative ties with other institutions in the STAR cluster.

== History ==
The center was conceived in 2006. Construction began in 2013 after securing funding from the European Regional Development Fund (ERDF) and Czech state grants, with the facility opening in phases between 2015-2016.

During the COVID-19 pandemic, BIOCEV’s laboratories were repurposed for PCR testing for regional health authorities.

In 2021, the original legal entity (BIOCEV z.s.p.o.) was dissolved, though research operations continued under CAS and Charles University management.

== Research programs ==
The center's research is organised into five programs which consist of 56 research teams.

=== Functional Genomics ===
This program studies genes involved in physiological systems and their pharmaceutical applications. It characterizes gene functions and interactions using rodent models at the Czech Centre for Phenogenomics, which is part of the Infrafrontier consortium. Research includes liver function, cardiovascular dysfunction, diabetes, metabolic disorders, hearing loss, and ocular disease.

- Program leader: Radislav Sedláček

=== Cell Biology and Virology ===
Organised into subprograms including Eukaryotic Microbiology, Tumor Cell Biology, Virology, and Mammalian Cell Structure/Differentiation, this program studies cellular functions across organisms. Research areas include tumor-virus associations, host-pathogen signaling, gene therapy, and vaccine development.

- Program leader: Jan Tachezy

=== Structural Biology and Protein Engineering ===
This program studies biomolecules using protein engineering and molecular biology techniques. Methodologies include X-ray crystallography and cryo-EM. Research includes protein structure determination and mass spectrometry methods.

- Program leader: Bohdan Schneider

=== Biomaterials and Tissue Engineering ===
This program develops carriers for drug delivery and tissue regeneration scaffolds. Research combines polymer chemistry, stem cell differentiation, and 3D bioprinting to create vascular grafts, bone/cartilage replacements, and neural matrices. Studies explore relationships between material properties and biological responses.

- Program leader: Tomáš Etrych

=== Development of Therapeutic and Diagnostic Procedures ===
This program studies molecular mechanisms of diseases including reproductive disorders, diabetes, and autoimmune conditions. It uses molecular biology and animal models to develop diagnostic kits and therapeutic strategies.

- Program leader: Stanislav Kmoch

== Core facilities ==
BIOCEV operates several shared-resource facilities providing specialized services to researchers and external users.

=== Czech Centre for Phenogenomics ===
Generates and analyzes genetically modified mouse models using CRISPR-Cas9 technology. Conducts phenotypic screening including metabolic, behavioral, and histological analysis.

- Facility head: Radislav Sedláček

=== Imaging Methods Core Facility ===
The Integrated Microscopy Core Facility (IMCF) provides fluorescence microscopy, electron microscopy, and flow cytometry services. The facility offers training, instrument access, and consulting services for experimental design, sample preparation, and data analysis. It also organizes courses on microscopic techniques.

- Facility head: Aleš Benda

=== OMICS Mass Spectrometry Core Facility ===
Provides services in proteomics and metabolomics. The proteomics division performs untargeted and targeted analyses, handling sample processing from protein isolation to data evaluation. The metabolomics service conducts analysis of small molecules using LC-MS and GCxGC-MS platforms.

- Facility head: Pavel Talacko

=== Centre of Molecular Structure ===
Focuses on the structural and biophysical analysis of biological molecules. It is part of the Czech Infrastructure for Integrative Structural Biology (CIISB). The facility uses techniques including X-ray crystallography and small-angle X-ray scattering (SAXS), and offers biophysical methods for characterizing biomolecules.

- Facility head: Jan Dohnálek

=== GeneCore Facility ===
Provides transcriptomic services for academic and commercial users, including bulk, single-cell, and spatial transcriptomic analysis. Services include experimental design consultation, sample preparation, library preparation, sequencing, and data analysis.

- Facility head: Lukáš Valihrach

=== OMICS Genomics ===
Provides DNA sequencing and DNA fragmentation analysis services. Uses Sanger sequencing and next-generation sequencing (NGS) on Illumina MiSeq platforms. Offers quality control for DNA, RNA, and NGS libraries using instrumentation such as spectrophotometers, fluorometers, and Bioanalyzer systems.

- Facility head: Štěpánka Hrdá

=== Media preparation and washing units ===
The washing unit provides cleaning services for laboratory glassware and plasticware. It handles laundering of work clothing and decontamination of genetically modified organism (GMO) waste and hazardous laboratory waste.

The media preparation unit prepares cultivation media and solutions for tissue culture. It produces bacteriological media and agar plates.

- Facility head: Miroslava Alblová

=== Cryobank ===
Provides long-term sample storage in liquid nitrogen. Consists of two units: one for cell lines and hybridomas, and another for mouse genetic material. The facility has automated storage systems with backup power and remote monitoring of environmental conditions. Also supplies dry ice.

- Facility head: Jana Kopkanová

== Funding and infrastructure ==
Initial construction costs were covered by the ERDF and Czech state funds. Operational funding comes from competitive grants, including Czech Science Foundation (GACR) awards and Horizon Europe projects.

The campus features a cogeneration plant and rainwater recycling systems.
