= 2017 Charles University Rector election =

- 20 October 2017
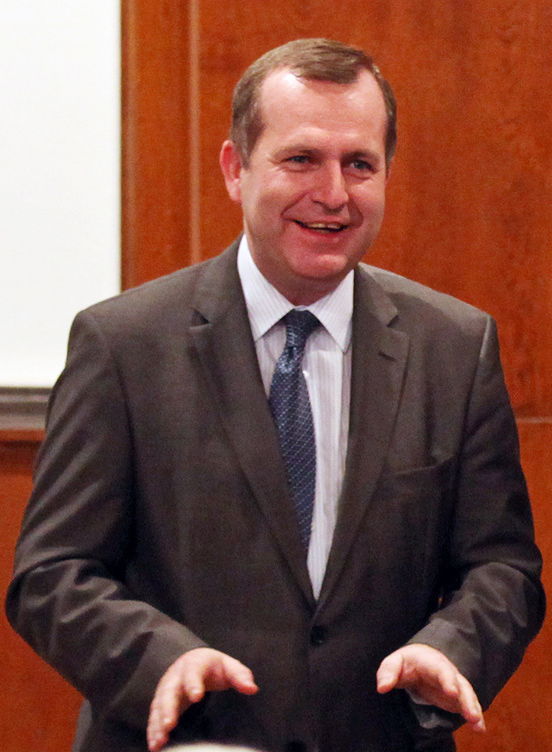

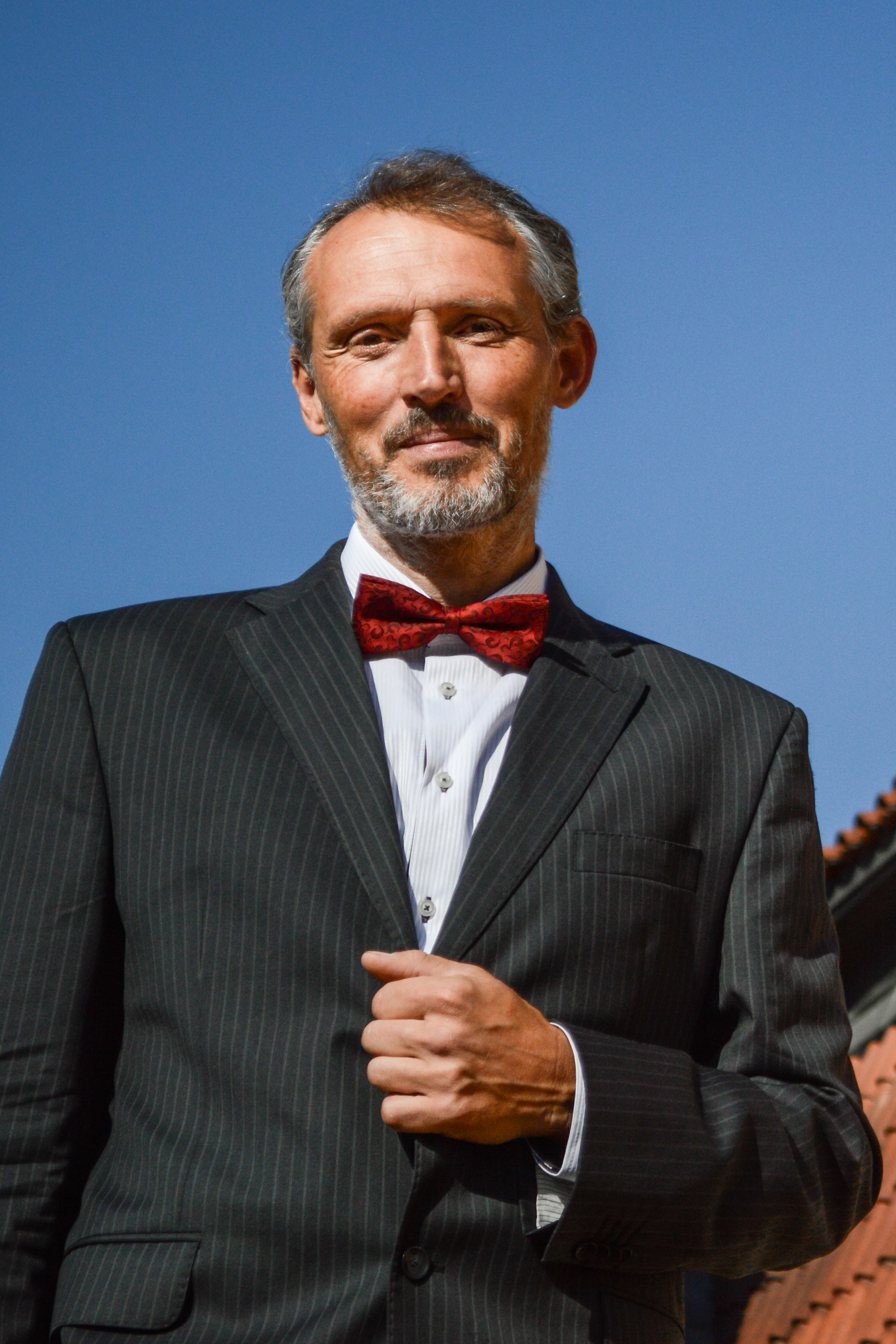
| Candidate | Tomáš Zima | Jan Černý |
| Electoral vote | 51 | 17 |
| Percentage | 75% | 25% |
Rector before election
Tomáš Zima
Elected Rector
Tomáš Zima

The Charles University Rector election, 2017 was held on 20 October 2017. The incumbent Rector Tomáš Zima defeated Jan Černý and was elected for his second term.

== Candidates ==
- Jan Černý, Biologist at Faculty of Natural Sciences.
- Tomáš Zima, the incumbent Rector.

== Voting ==
| Tomáš Zima | Jan Černý |
|---|---|
| 51 | 17 |

68 members of academic senate voted. Zima received 51 votes to Černý's 17 votes and thus was reelected.

Czech President Miloš Zeman confirmed the election on 21 January 2018 and reappointed Zima the Rector. He will remain in the position until 2022 when is second term expires. He won't be eligible to run for another term.
