= Vestec (Prague-West District) =

- Municipality
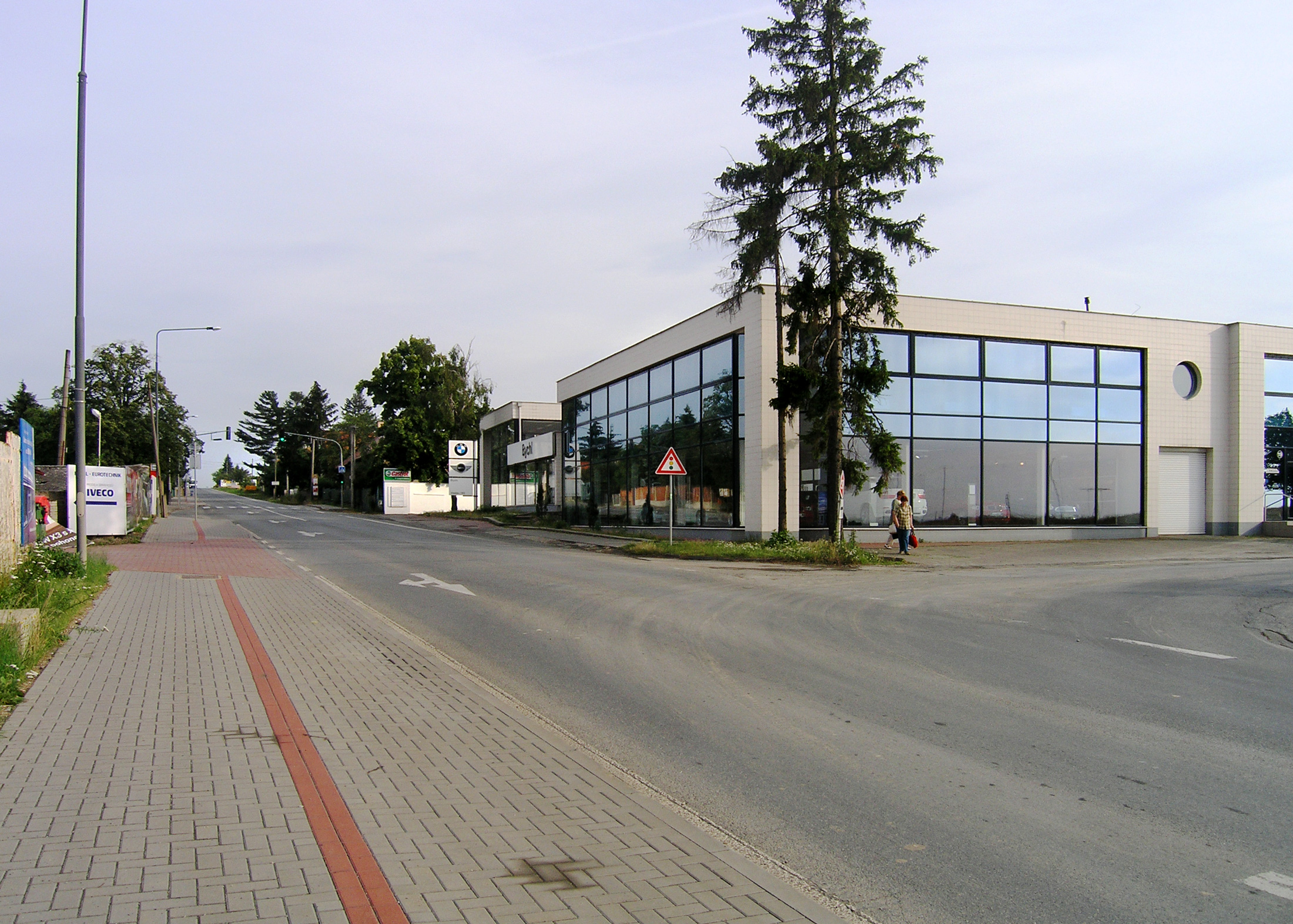
- Vídeňská street

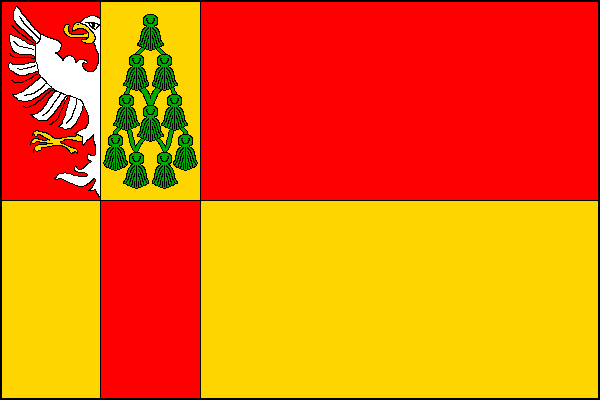
- Flag Coat of arms

- Location in the Czech Republic
- Coordinates: 49°58′50″N 14°30′18″E
- Country: Czech Republic
- Region: Central Bohemian
- District: Prague-West
- First mentioned: 1360

Area
  - Total: 4.72 km^{2} (1.82 sq mi)
- Elevation: 327 m (1,073 ft)

Population (2026-01-01)
  - Total: 3,252
  - Density: 689/km^{2} (1,780/sq mi)
- Time zone: UTC+1 (CET)
  - Summer (DST): UTC+2 (CEST)
- Postal code: 252 50
- Website: vestec.cz

Vestec (Czech pronunciation: [ˈvɛstɛts]) is a municipality and village in Prague-West District in the Central Bohemian Region of the Czech Republic. It has about 3,300 inhabitants.

== Etymology ==
The name is derived from the Czech word ves, i.e. 'village'.

== Geography ==
Vestec is located south of Prague, in its immediate vicinity. It lies in a flat agricultural landscape in the Prague Plateau. In the centre of the municipality is the fishpond Vestecký rybník, supplied by the stream Olšanský potok.

== History ==
The first written mention of Vestec is in a deed of King Charles IV from 1360. The village was then a part of the Kostelec estate (today Zbořený Kostelec within Týnec nad Sázavou). From 1454, Vestec was a property of the Old Town of Prague. From the 17th century until the establishment of an independent municipality, Vestec belonged to the Dolní Břežany estate and was owned mainly by the Prague archbishopric.

== Demographics ==
Historical population

| Year | Pop. | ±% |
|---|---|---|
| 1869 | 340 | — |
| 1880 | 370 | +8.8% |
| 1890 | 346 | −6.5% |
| 1900 | 342 | −1.2% |
| 1910 | 392 | +14.6% |

| Year | Pop. | ±% |
|---|---|---|
| 1921 | 298 | −24.0% |
| 1930 | 351 | +17.8% |
| 1950 | 356 | +1.4% |
| 1961 | 399 | +12.1% |
| 1970 | 413 | +3.5% |

| Year | Pop. | ±% |
|---|---|---|
| 1980 | 464 | +12.3% |
| 1991 | 369 | −20.5% |
| 2001 | 774 | +109.8% |
| 2011 | 2,424 | +213.2% |
| 2021 | 2,860 | +18.0% |

Source: Censuses

== Transport ==
The D0 motorway (part of the European route E50) runs south of Vestec, just outside the municipal territory.

== Sights ==
There are no cultural monuments in the municipality.
