= Václav Hampl =

Czech physiologist and politician

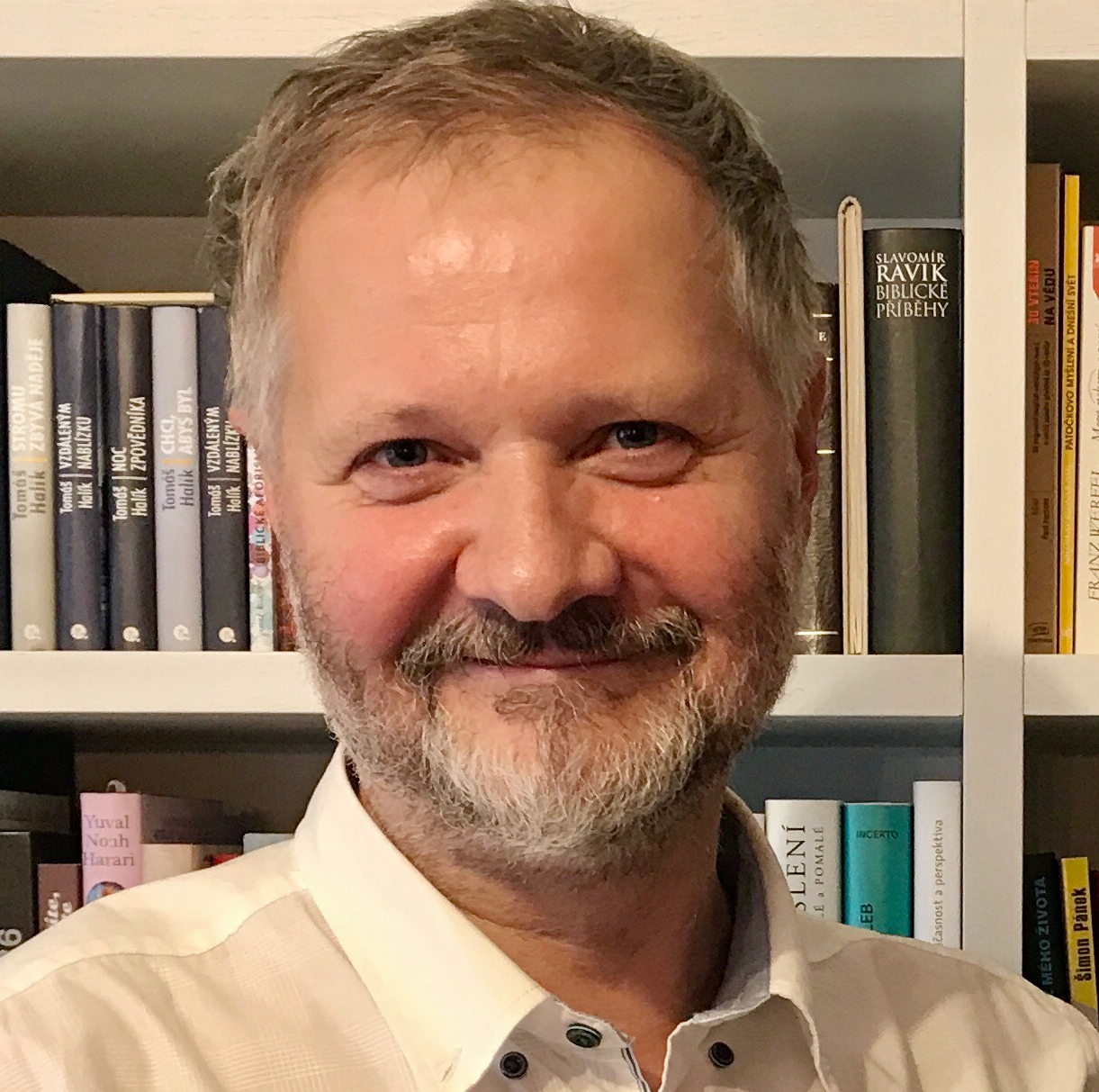

Senator from Prague 1
- In office 18 October 2014 – 18 October 2020
- Preceded by: Zdeněk Schwarz
- Succeeded by: Miroslava Němcová

507th Rector of the Charles University
- In office 1 February 2006 – 31 January 2014
- Preceded by: Ivan Wilhelm
- Succeeded by: Tomáš Zima

Personal details
- Born: 1 July 1962 (age 64) Prague, Czechoslovakia (now Czech Republic)
- Party: Independent
- Spouse: Alice
- Education: Charles University

Václav Hampl (born 1 July 1962) is a Czech physiologist and a former politician who was a Senator from Prague 1 from 2014 until 2020. From 2006 to 2014, Hampl served as Rector of the Charles University.

== Research ==
Hampl was born in Prague, Czechoslovakia in 1962. He received his PhD from the Czechoslovak Academy of Sciences in 1990. He did postgraduate work at the University of Minnesota Medical School and, since 2002, has been a professor of physiology at Charles University in Prague. His research has focused on the pulmonary circulation and its use of nitric oxide as a signaling agent. His research publications have been cited more than 3,750 times, his H-index is 28.

In February 2006, Hampl became the 507th rector of Charles University. After serving the two four-years terms stipulated by law, he stepped down on 31 January 2014, and was succeeded by Tomáš Zima.

== Professional Membership ==
In 2006–2011 Hampl served in the association of rectors of public, state and private higher education institutions in the Czech Republic, the Czech Rectors Conference, as its Vice-President for public relations and foreign affairs, and Vice-President for creative activities, respectively; in 2011–2014 he served as its President.

In 2009 he was a member of the board of trustees of the Europaeum.

In 2010–2011 he served as the chair of the Bioethical Committee of the Czech Republic.

In 2011–2015 he was a board member of the European University Association, where he also serves in the Research policy working group (since 2009) and the steering committee of Council for Doctoral Education (since 2013).

During his rectorship three large infrastructure projects were prepared and mostly completed using European structural funds: the biomedical centers in Plzeň and Hradec Králové, and BIOCEV, a biotechnology center in Vestec near Prague shared with six institutes of the Czech Academy of Sciences. Charles University also acquired a large building complex, "Crystal", near the location of Faculty of sports, as well as a double property on Opletalova street in the centre of Prague.

== Politics ==
In September 2014 Hampl was elected Senator in the district of central Prague (the Senate district Prague 1 also includes the whole of Prague 7 and parts of Prague 6, 5 and 2), running as an independent with support from the Christian and Democratic Union – Czechoslovak People's Party (KDU-ČSL) and the Green Party. He served as the chair of the Senate's Committee on European Union Affairs.

In 2018, KDU-ČSL nominated him to become President of the Senate. The election was held on 14 November 2018. Hampl advanced to the second round but was defeated by Jaroslav Kubera.

Hampl decided to seek re-election for his Senate seat in the 2020 Senate election. He was once again nominated by KDU-ČSL and received support from the Green Party. In the second round of the elections on October 10, Hampl was defeated by Miroslava Němcová.
