= Mendel University in Brno =

Agricultural university in Brno, Czech Republic

- Mendelova univerzita v Brně
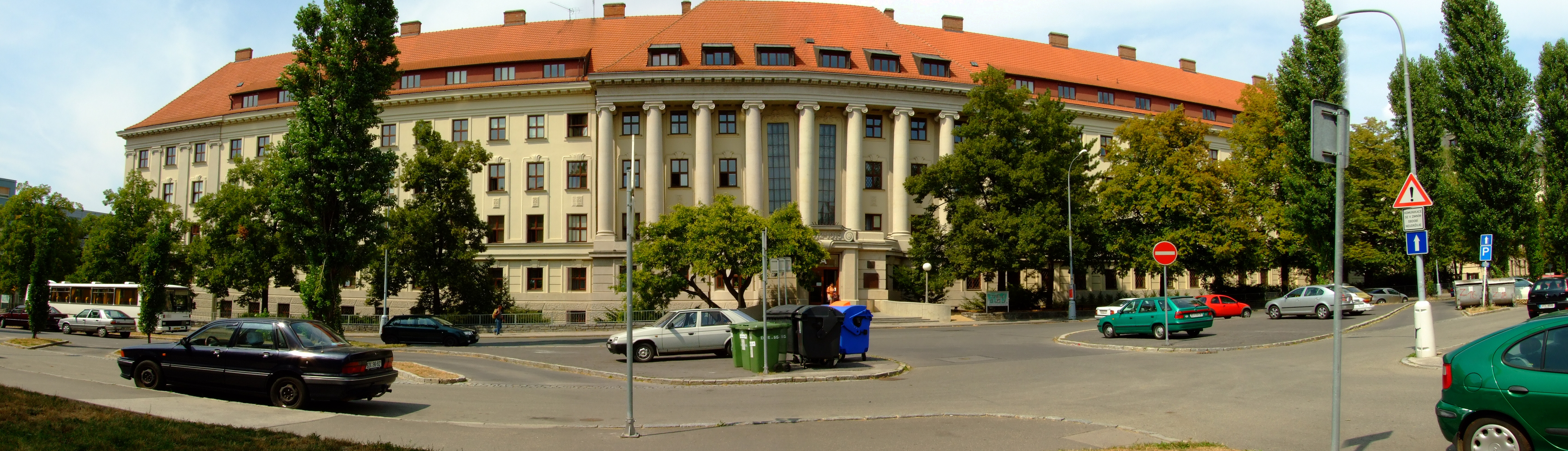
- Mendel University
- Former names: University of Agriculture in Brno (1919–1994), Mendel University of Agriculture and Forestry in Brno (1994–2009)
- Type: Public
- Established: 1919
- Rector: Jan Mareš
- Administrative staff: 595
- Students: 9,665
- Doctoral students: 518
- Location: Brno, Czech Republic; 49.210207°N 16.615883°E
- Website: http://www.mendelu.cz/en?lang=en;
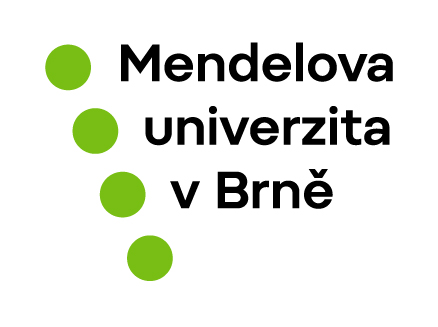

University rankings

Global – Overall
- QS World: 851-900 (2026)

Regional – Overall
- QS Emerging Europe and Central Asia: 74 (2022)

Mendel University in Brno (Czech: Mendelova univerzita v Brně) is located in Brno, Czech Republic. It was founded on 24 July 1919 on the basis of the former Tábor Academy. The university comprises five faculties and one institute - the Faculty of AgriSciences, Faculty of Forestry and Wood Technology, Faculty of Business and Economics, Faculty of Horticulture, Faculty of Regional Development and International Studies and Institute of Lifelong Education. Since 1994, the university has been named after Gregor Johann Mendel, the botanist and "father of genetics", who conducted much of his research in Brno.

In June 2020, the university was included in the QS World University Rankings top 1,000 for the first time, placed #701-750.

== History ==
Established on July 24, 1919, the university initially known as the University of Agriculture is the oldest agricultural school in Czechoslovakia. Renamed in the mid-1990s to honor Gregor Johann Mendel, reflecting its strong heritage in the agricultural sciences. It began with programs in forestry and economics and has since expanded to include several specialized faculties and research institutes.

In 2010, it adopted the name Mendel University in Brno. The establishment of CEITEC MENDELU in 2011 integrated the university into the Central European Institute of Technology, enhancing its research capabilities.

== Scientific research tasks ==
The resolution of scientific research tasks is based on the long-term forecast and scientific orientation of the university and its faculties, covering the fields of agricultural, forestry, biological, economic, and technical sciences. It involves an open range of research activities, implemented in institutional research, competitive grant agency procedures, research centers, and international scientific research programs. The research program at MENDELU in Brno generally follows current trends in the development of basic scientific disciplines, especially biology and their applications in agricultural, forestry, horticultural, and economic sciences.

In practical implementation, it involves targeted management of biological processes, efficient utilization of non-renewable and creation of renewable natural resources in the development of sustainable, multifunctional agriculture and agribusiness. Emphasis is placed on the quality and safety of agricultural products in general, and food in particular. In the context of the conclusions of the EU Common Agricultural Policy, the university prioritizes topics related to multifunctional agriculture and forestry, the significance of their production and non-production functions in shaping the landscape and rural development."

== Faculties ==
- Faculty of AgriSciences

Department of Plant Biology
Department of Applied and Landscape Ecology
Department of Agrosystems and Bioclimatology
Department of Crop Science, Plant Breeding and Plant Medicine
Department of Agrochemistry, Soil Science, Microbiology and Plant Nutrition
Department of Animal Nutrition and Forage Production
Department of Animal Morphology, Physiology and Genetics
Department of Zoology, Fisheries, Hydrobiology and Apiculture
Department of Molecular Biology and Radiobiology
Department of Agriculture, Food and Environmental Engineering
Department of Engineering and Automobile Transport
Department of Food Technology
Department of Animal Breeding
Department of Chemistry and Biochemistry
Department of Physical Training

- Faculty of Forestry and Wood Technology

Department of Forest Management and Applied Geoinformatics
Department of Geology and Pedology
Department of Mathematics
Department of Forest Botany, Dendrology and Geobiocoenology
Department of Forest and Wood Products Economics and Policy
Department of Landscape Management
Department of Forest and Forest Products Technology
Department of Forest Protection and Wildlife Management
Department of Silviculture
Department of Wood Processing
Department of Furniture, Design and Habitat
Department of Wood Science
Institute of Forest Ecology

- Faculty of Business and Economics

Department of Economics
Department of Business Economics
Department of Management
Department of Statistics and Operational Analysis
Department of Accounting and Taxation
Department of Marketing and Trade
Department of Informatics
Department of Law
Department of Finance
Department of Social Sciences

- Faculty of Horticulture in Lednice

Department of Fruit Growing
Department of Horticultural Machinery
Department of Vegetable Growing and Floriculture
Department of Breeding and Propagation of Horticultural Plants
Department of Post-harvest Technology of Horticultural Products
Department of Viticulture and Viniculture
Department of Garden and Landscape Architecture
Department of Planting Design and Maintenance
Department of Landscape Planning
The Mendeleum - Institute of Genetics and Plant Breeding

- Institute of Lifelong Learning
- Faculty of Regional Development and International Studies

=== Bachelor programs of the Faculty of Regional Development and International Studies ===
- Regional Development (in Czech)
- Regional Development (in English, study is paid)
- International Territorial Studies (in Czech)
- International Territorial Studies (in English study is paid)

=== Master programs of the Faculty of Regional Development and International Studies ===
- Regional Development (in Czech)
- Regional Development (in English, study is paid)
- International Territorial Studies (in Czech)
- International Territorial Studies (in English study is paid)
