= University of Veterinary Sciences Brno =

University in Czech Republic

- Veterinární univerzita Brno
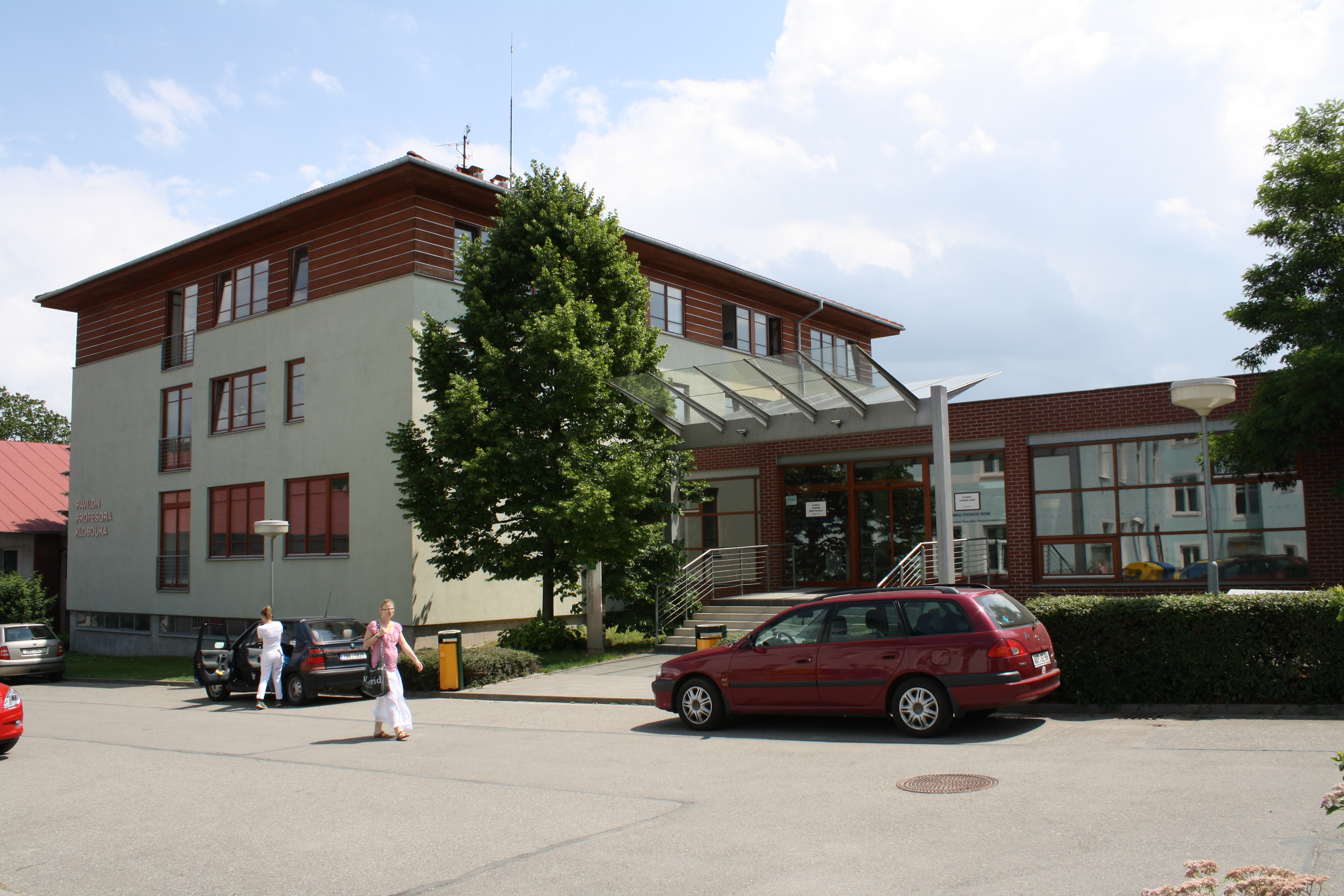
- Type: Public
- Established: 1918
- Rector: Eva Voslářová
- Location: Brno, Czech Republic; 49°13′2.21″N 16°35′45.2″E
- Campus: Urban
- Nickname: VFU, VETUNI
- Website: www.vfu.cz

The University of Veterinary Sciences Brno (Czech: Veterinární univerzita Brno, abbreviated VFU or VETUNI) is a public university located in Brno, Czech Republic.

It was founded on December 12, 1918, as the Veterinary College, and its first rector was Edward Babak. It is a natural science university that educates experts in the veterinary field. It is the only university in the Czech Republic offering a study program in veterinary medicine. The university campus has specialized clinics for small animals, birds and exotic animals, horses, ruminants, and pigs, other institutes of pre-clinical disciplines, and a library.

== Organization of the university ==
Brno Veterinary University is managed by the rector. The rector is represented by three vice-rectors: the vice-rector for education, the vice-rector for science, research, and foreign relations, and the vice-rector for development and construction of VFU Brno, contact with practice, and university agricultural enterprise. The economic and administrative running of the university is managed by the quaestor. Self-governing activities are implemented at the university through the University's Academic Senate.

The Board of Directors of VFU Brno operates at the university. The issues of educational and scientific activity are discussed in the Scientific Council of the university. The university is divided into the rectorate, which includes other workplaces, and two faculties: the Faculty of Veterinary Medicine and the Faculty of Veterinary Hygiene and Ecology. In 2020, its Pharmaceutical Faculty was transferred to Masaryk University, and the reference to pharmacy was subsequently removed from the university's name in 2021.

== Scientific and research activity ==
Part of university life includes scientific, research, and creative activity. Funds for these activities are usually obtained from external sources in competition with other applicants. The most important sources of funds are from research plans, the national research program, grants from grant agencies, funds from institutional and specific research, contractual research with companies, and possibly other contractors, and participation in international project solutions. The university is involved in an project of the CEITEC Center of Excellence, while its workplaces are successful in obtaining EU funds.

The university has special workplaces, the activities of which are subject to a special regime and require a special permit. These workplaces are under the supervision of a special commission and a special office of the state administration. Specifically, they include a workplace dealing with high-risk biological agents and toxins, workplaces using genetically modified organisms, workplaces for working with radioisotopes, workplaces using X-ray devices, workplaces authorized to handle certain addictive substances, and workplaces authorized to handle dangerous chemical substances. The university is also accredited as an Animal Experimentation User Facility.

The university is open to gaining international experience and supports exchange stays for students and teachers as part of international projects such as Erasmus, Life Long Learning, or based on bilateral contracts, or as freemovers. Students and teachers of the university complete short-term and long-term stays at university workplaces in Europe and, in the United States of America.

== School farm ==
The school agricultural enterprise is part of the university. It operates on 3,176 hectares in the Nové Jičín area and 179 hectares in the Nový Dvůr area near Brno. Plant production is focused on wheat, barley, corn, rapeseed, mustard, poppy, pea, clover, grasses, and perennial fodder. Livestock production is concentrated on cattle and pigs of all categories. Part of the school enterprise also includes a nature reserve with fallow deer breeding, a pheasant farm with pheasant and other game bird breeding, and hunting mainly of roe deer. A university bird hunt is held every year in the autumn months. The school farm is an important resource for the practical teaching of students in the field of veterinary care for farm animals.
