= Tomáš Zima =

Czech medical doctor, chemist and teaching professor

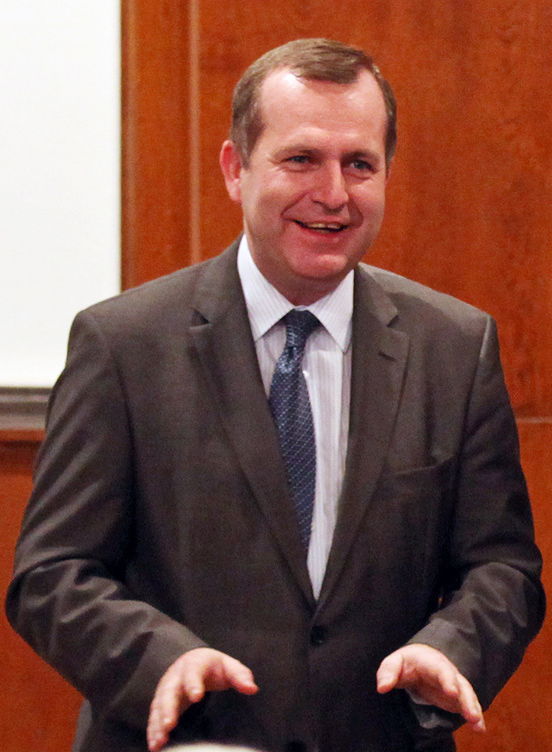

508th Rector of Charles University
- In office 2014–2022
- Preceded by: Václav Hampl
- Succeeded by: Milena Králíčková

Dean of First Faculty of Medicine
- In office 2005–2012
- Preceded by: Štěpán Svačina
- Succeeded by: Aleksi Šedo

Personal details
- Born: 2 July 1966 (age 60) Prague, Czechoslovakia
- Party: KSČ (1983–1990)
- Spouse: Aneta Doušová
- Children: 3
- Education: Charles University
- Occupation: Charles University
- Profession: Doctor of Medicine, Biochemist
- Website: www.tomaszima.cz

Tomáš Zima (born 2 July 1966) is a Czech medical doctor and chemist. He is a university professor in the fields of biochemistry, clinical chemistry and laboratory medicine. He was the Rector of Charles University in Prague in 2014–2022 and was a candidate in the 2023 Czech presidential election.

== Academic career ==
Zima graduated from the First Faculty of Medicine of Charles University in 1990. He has been a professor of medical chemistry and biochemistry since 2001 and head of the Institute of Medical Biochemistry and Laboratory Medicine of the First Faculty of Medicine and General University Hospital, Prague. He is a specialist in clinical chemistry, and European Specialist in Laboratory Medicine (EuSpLM). He was the Dean of the First Faculty of Medicine from 2005 to 2012 and then became Rector of the university. He was visiting professor Università degli Studi di Milano in 2024.

His main research interests include oxidative stress, advanced glycation end-products (AGEs), experimental nephrology, tumor markers, and laboratory management and accreditation. He is the author of more than 550 articles, which are cited more than 7000 times in the Science Citation Index, eleven books and co-author of 71 chapters in books, with an H-index of 35. He has given more than 130 lectures outside the Czech Republic.

Zima is a member of several scientific societies, including the Czech Medical Academy and Czech Learned Society and serves on Boards including the executive board of EFLM, and the Conferences and Congresses Committee of the International Federation of Clinical Chemistry and Laboratory Medicine. He is a member of the European Commission's Scientific Panel for Health (SPH).

== Entry into politics ==
Tomáš Zima was a candidate in the 2023 Czech presidential election. He finished last of eight candidates in the first round on 14 January 2023, with 0.55%.

== Political views ==
During his presidential campaign, Zima voiced his support for the right to keep and bear arms, describing it as a "matter of principle" for him. Zima said he owns two CZ pistols and trains in defensive gun use at a shooting range. He further commented that "any greater restrictions would be to the detriment of issues related to the protection of the freedom of individuals, but also of the state", stating that as president, he would veto restrictions on the legal possession of firearms by civilians.
