= Milena Králíčková =

Czech medical doctor and university professor

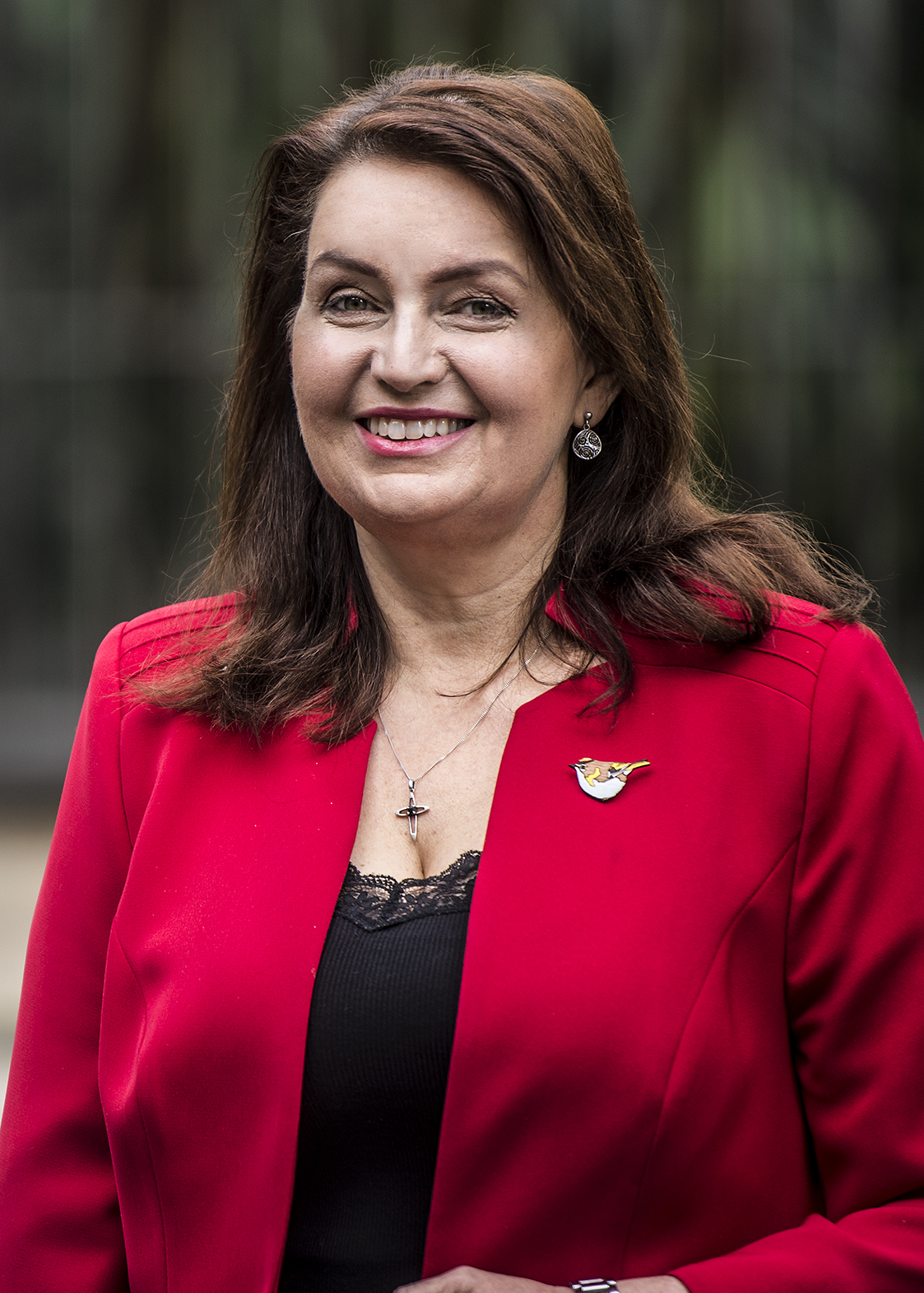

509th Rector of Charles University
- In office 1 February 2022 – 31 January 2026
- Preceded by: Tomáš Zima
- Succeeded by: Jiří Zima

Vice-Rector for Education of Charles University
- In office 2014–2022

Personal details
- Born: 4 February 1972 (age 54) Strakonice, Czechoslovakia
- Children: 2
- Education: Charles University
- Occupation: University professor

Milena Králíčková (born 4 February 1972) is a Czech medical doctor and university professor, specializing in histology and embryology. From February 2022 to January 2026, she served as the Rector of Charles University in Prague, Czech Republic, making her the first woman to hold this position.

== Biography ==
She completed her medical degree at the Faculty of Medicine in Plzeň, Charles University, and received her doctoral degree in anatomy, histology and embryology. As part of her postgraduate studies, she completed a Fulbright fellowship at Harvard University. She has been leading the Department of Histology and Embryology at the Faculty of Medicine in Plzeň since 2011. From 2014 to 2022, she was the Vice-Rector for Education at Charles University.

== See also ==
- List of Charles University rectors
