= First Faculty of Medicine, Charles University =

Medical faculty

First Faculty of Medicine
- 1. lékařská fakulta Univerzity Karlovy
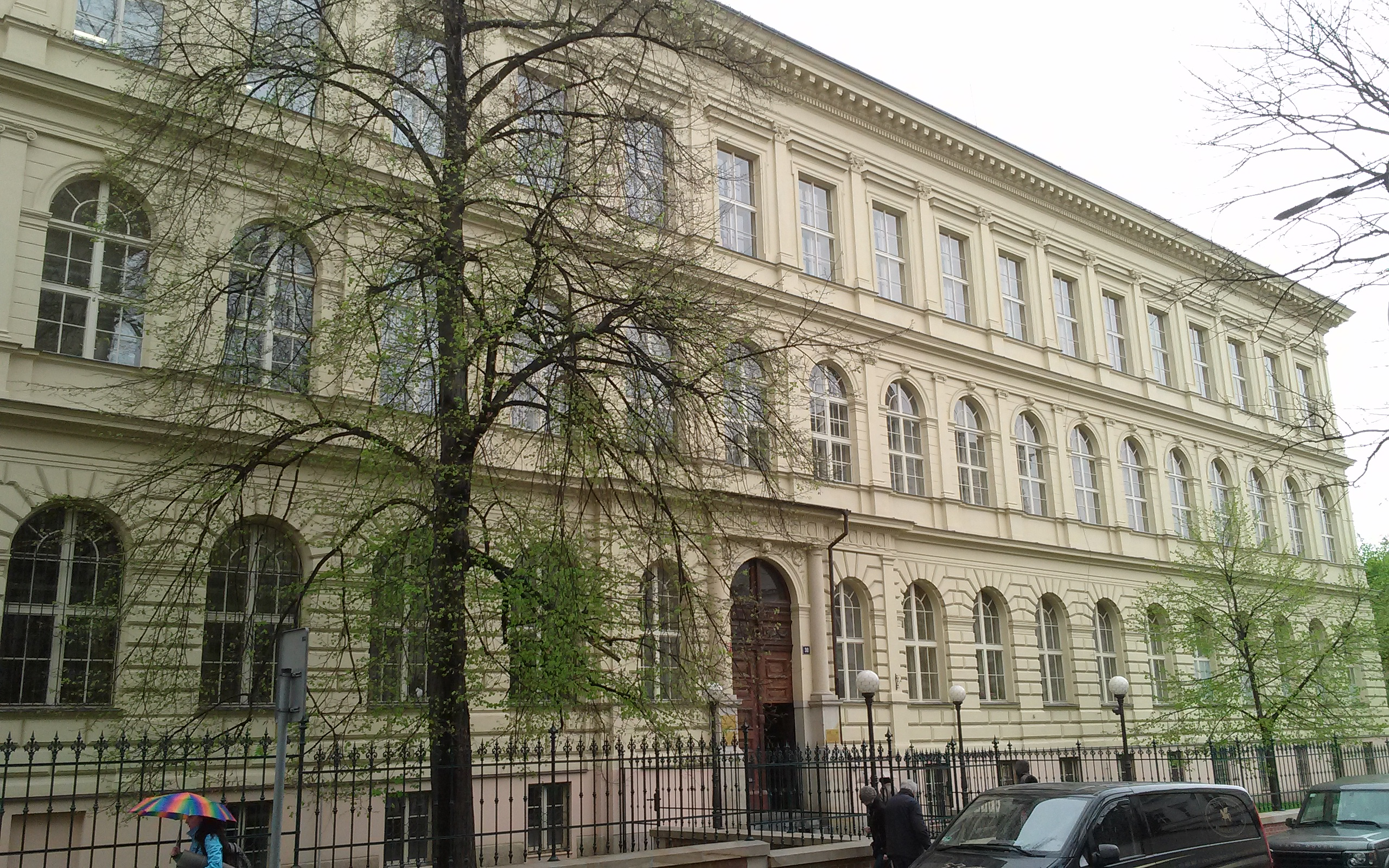
- First Faculty of Medicine main building
- Latin: Facultas Medica Prima Universitatis Caroli
- Type: Public
- Established: 1348
- Affiliations: Charles University
- Rector: Milena Králíčková
- Dean: Martin Vokurka
- Administrative staff: 1200
- Students: 3400
- Location: Prague, Czech Republic; 50°4′27.63″N 14°25′36.65″E
- Website: www.lf1.cuni.cz

The First Faculty of Medicine of Charles University (Czech: 1. lékařská fakulta Univerzity Karlovy) is one of five medical faculties of Charles University, Prague, Czech Republic. Founded in 1348, at the same time as the university itself, it is the oldest medical faculty in Central Europe and the 11th oldest medical institution in the world.

Situated in the centre of Prague, the faculty provides education in all fields of general medicine. It is regularly ranked in the top 1% of medical faculties globally.

== History ==
Charles University was established in 1348 and a medieval faculty of medicine was one of the four founding faculties (with the Faculty of Arts, Faculty of Law, and Faculty of Theology).

In 1882, as part of the division of the university during the Austro-Hungarian Empire, a separate German faculty was founded. The two parallel faculties, one German and one Czech, remained until the foundation of the independent state of Czechoslovakia in 1918, when the German faculty was disbanded. In 1953 the former Faculty of Medicine in Prague was divided into three medical faculties: the Faculty of General Medicine, the Faculty of Pediatric Medicine, and the Faculty of Hygiene. Following the Velvet Revolution, these three faculties evolved into the First, Second and Third Faculty of Medicine, respectively.

== Admissions ==
Admission to the faculty is based on performance in high school (Biology, Chemistry and Physics), English proficiency and performance in entrance exams. Entrance examinations are conducted at the university and by some representative offices abroad, and are considered to be among the hardest university entrance exams in Europe. After the entrance exams, MMI interviews are conducted with successful candidates.

Most of the international students studying medicine at the institute originate from the United States, Canada, United Kingdom, Norway, Sweden, Germany, Italy, Greece, Portugal, Israel, Malaysia, India and the Middle East, and more.

== Academics ==
Around 3400 students are enrolled in the First Faculty of Medicine. Most teaching facilities are located in the centre of Prague, near Charles Square, I. P. Pavlova and Albertov. The majority of clinical instruction takes place at the General University Hospital in Prague, and other teaching hospitals include the Military University Hospital in Prague, Thomayer University Hospital, Bulovka Hospital and Motol University Hospital.

The faculty runs bachelor's and master's degrees, and several Ph.D. study programmes. The two main study programmes at the faculty are General Medicine and Dentistry, taught either in English (paid) or Czech (free). The Medicine programme lasts for 6 years, and Dentistry for 5 years.

The teaching staff consists of around 110 professors, 150 associate professors and around 700 assistant professors. Alongside preclinical and clinical teaching, the faculty is also an active research institution.

== Ranking and reputation ==
The faculty is consistently ranked in the top 1% out of 17000 institutions in the world. It is currently ranked #1 in the Czech Republic and #133 in clinical medicine in the world.

== Notable Graduates ==
The First Faculty of Medicine is one of the oldest and most prestigious medical schools in Europe. It has produced numerous notable alumni who have made significant contributions to medicine and other fields.

- Jan Evangelista Purkyně (1787–1869): Czech anatomist and physiologist, best known for his discovery of Purkinje cells in the cerebellum and Purkinje fibers in the heart.
- Franz Hofmeister (1850 - 1922): German pharmacologist, physician and biochemist. Hofmeister (independently and simultaneously to Emil Fischer) was the first to propose that polypeptides were amino acids linked by peptide bonds.
- Carl Ferdinand Cori (1896–1984) and Gerty Cori (1896–1957): Husband and wife were awarded the Nobel Prize in Physiology and Medicine in 1947 for their discovery of the course of the conversion of lactate.
- Emil Votoček (1872–1950): Although primarily known as a chemist, Votoček studied medicine initially. He made significant contributions to organic chemistry, including work on sugars and heterocyclic compounds
- Stanislav Grof (born 1931): Czech psychiatrist and one of the founders of the field of transpersonal psychology, which examines the spiritual aspects of the human mind. He is known for his early studies of LSD and its effects on the psyche.

== Student associations ==
Within the 1. Faculty multiple student associations exist (SMC and MedSoc). They have their offices in Faust House and are responsible for helping new students get used to the university life as well as organise extracurricular activities, including Freshers Week every September. Furthermore numerous interest groups exist, such as a surgical society, which envisions the nurture of aspiring surgeons from all years by providing research opportunities, away clerkships and workshops.

== Gallery ==
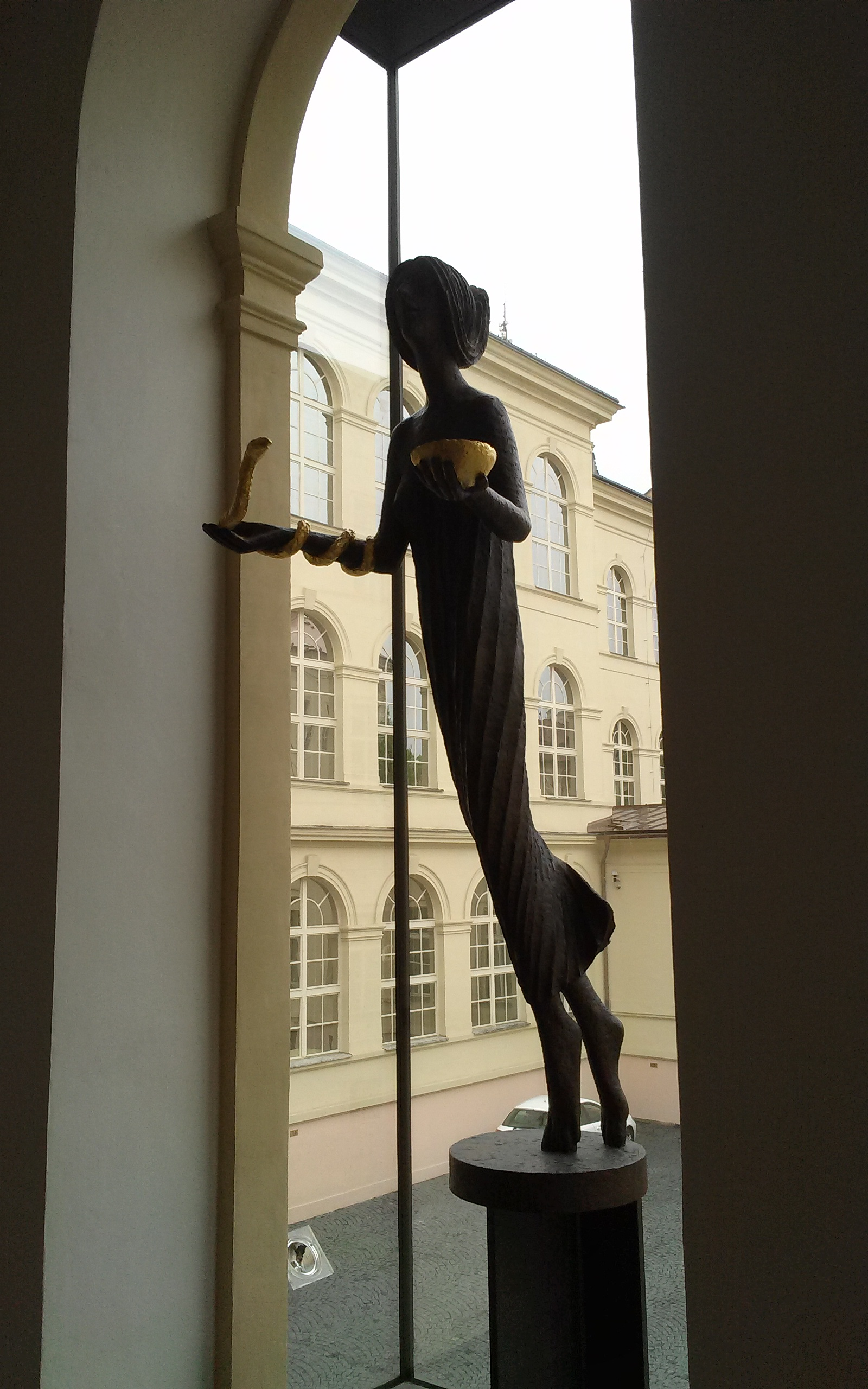
Statue of Hygieia in the hall of the main building

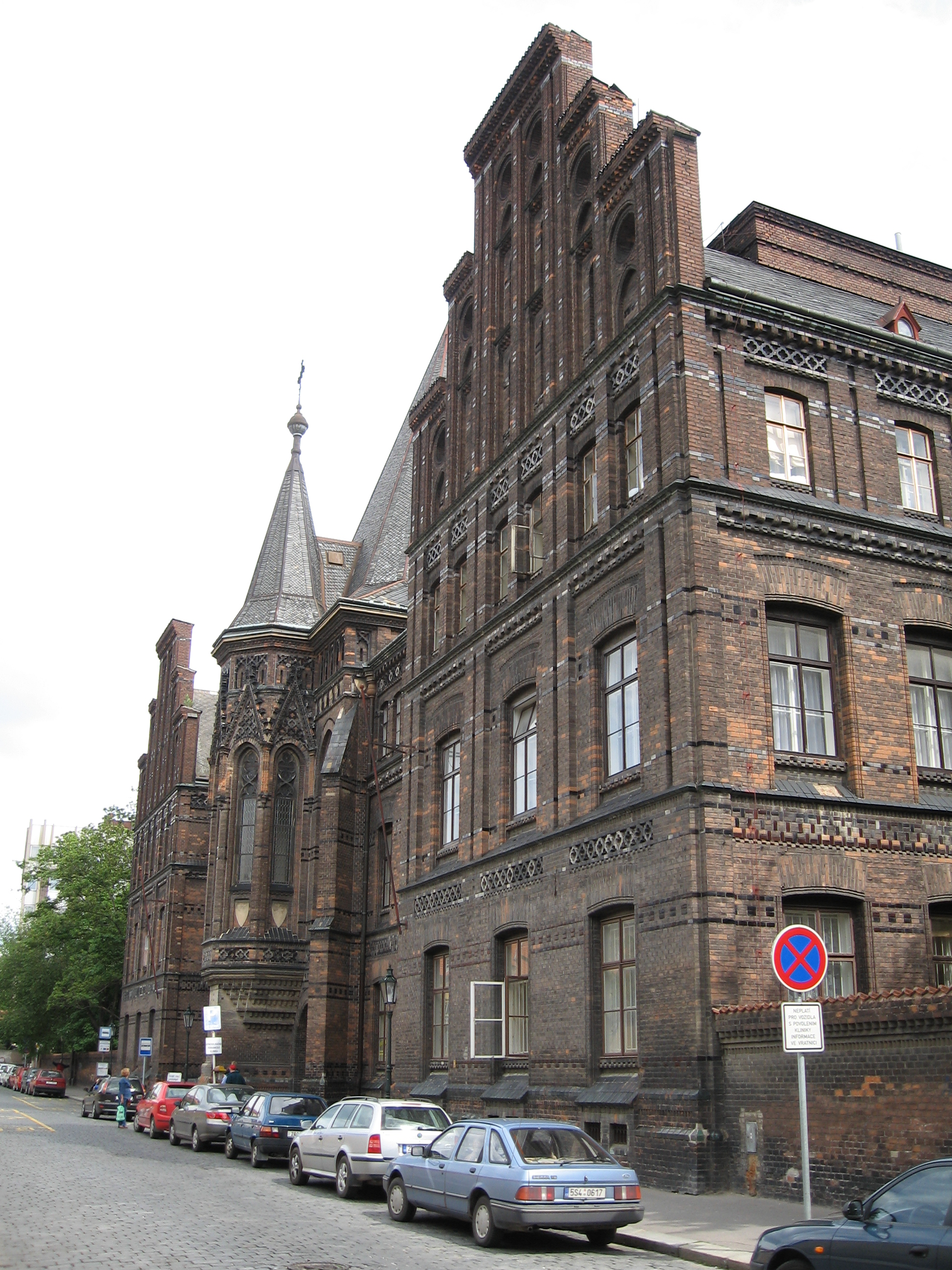
Clinic of Gynecology and Obstetrics

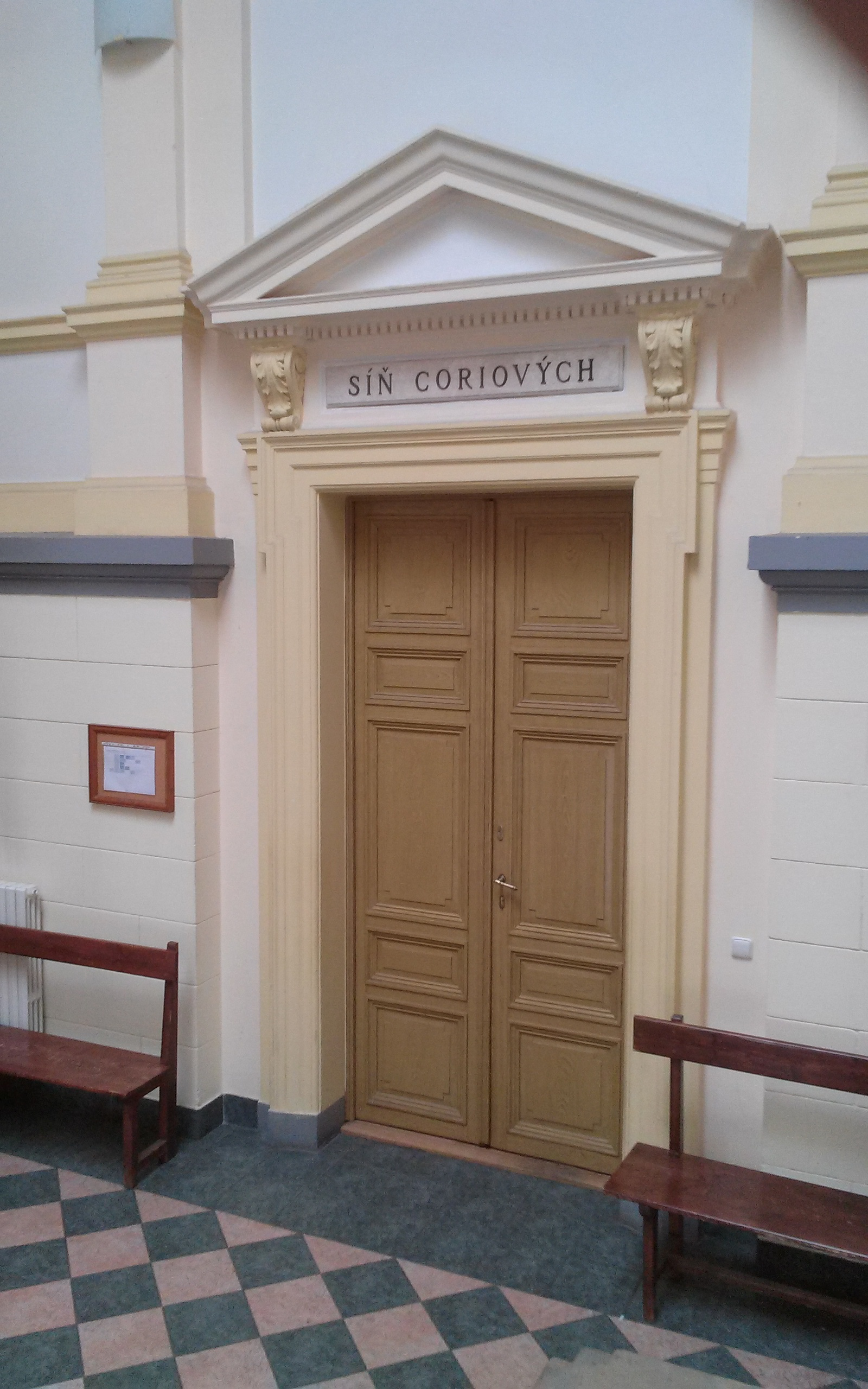
Hall of Carl Ferdinand Cori and Gerty Cori, Nobel Prize–winning scientists and Charles University alumni

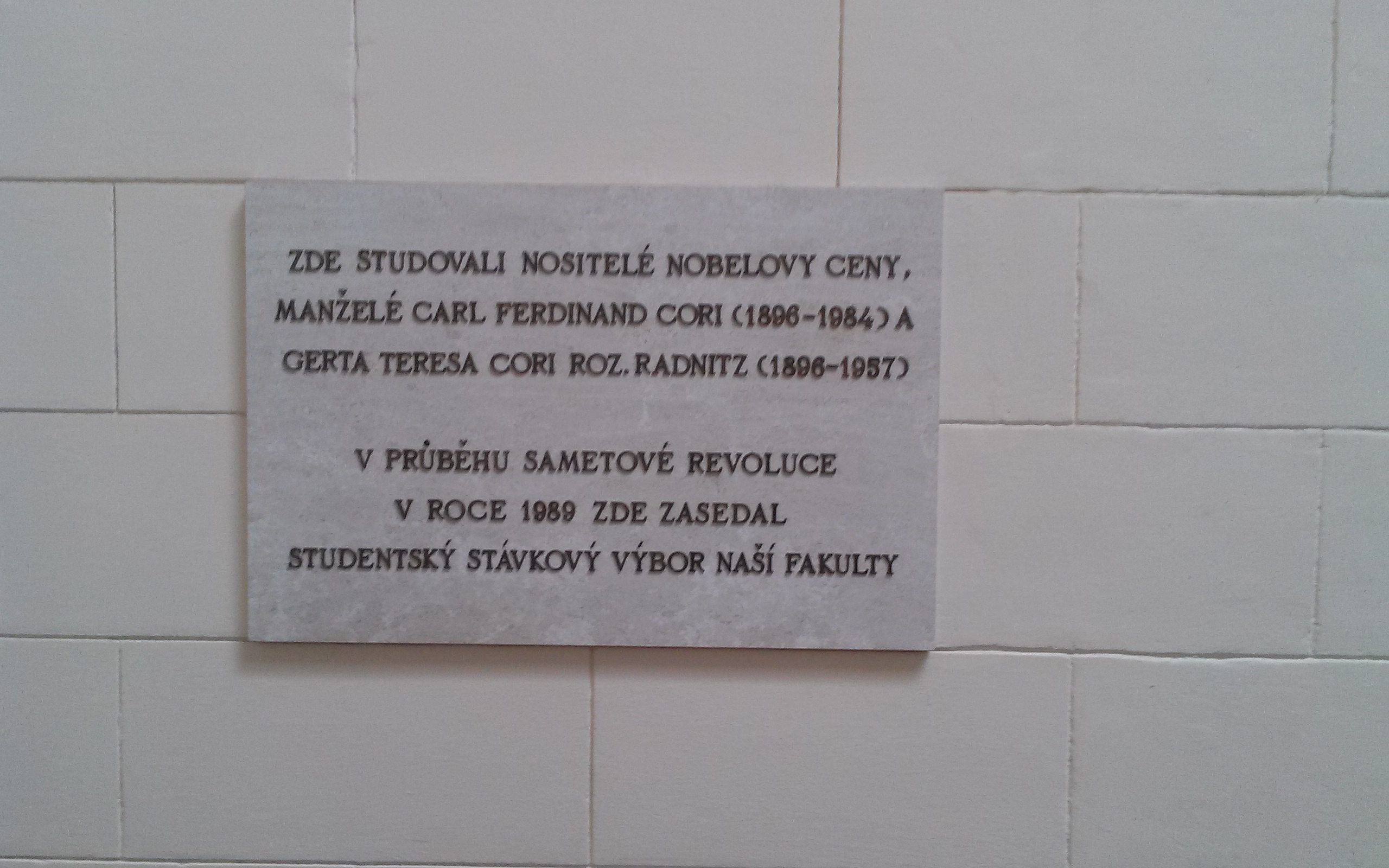
Commemorative plaque on Cori Hall, a memorial to Carl and Gerty Cori and to the Velvet Revolution

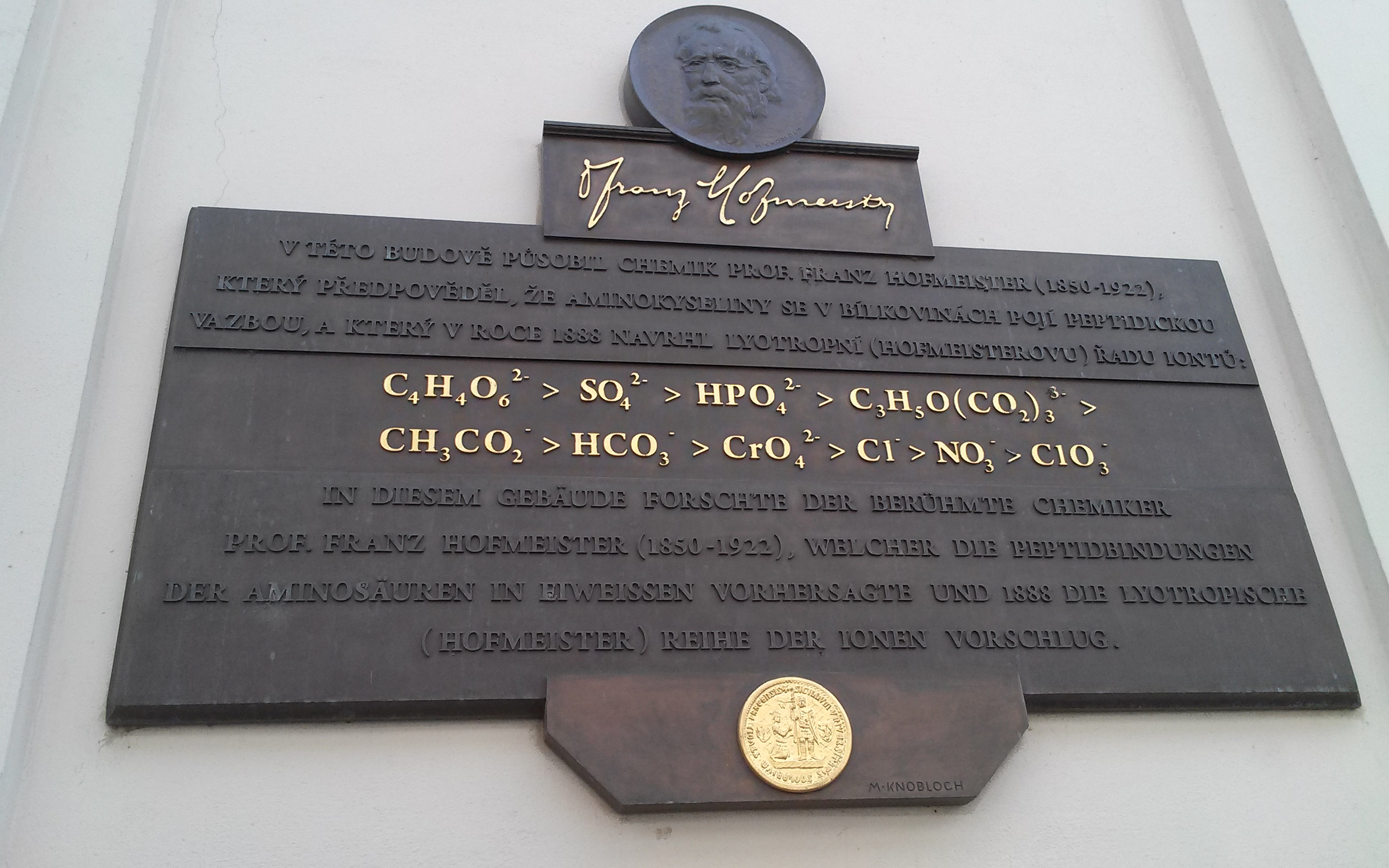
Commemorative plaque on the building where Franz Hofmeister conducted his scientific research

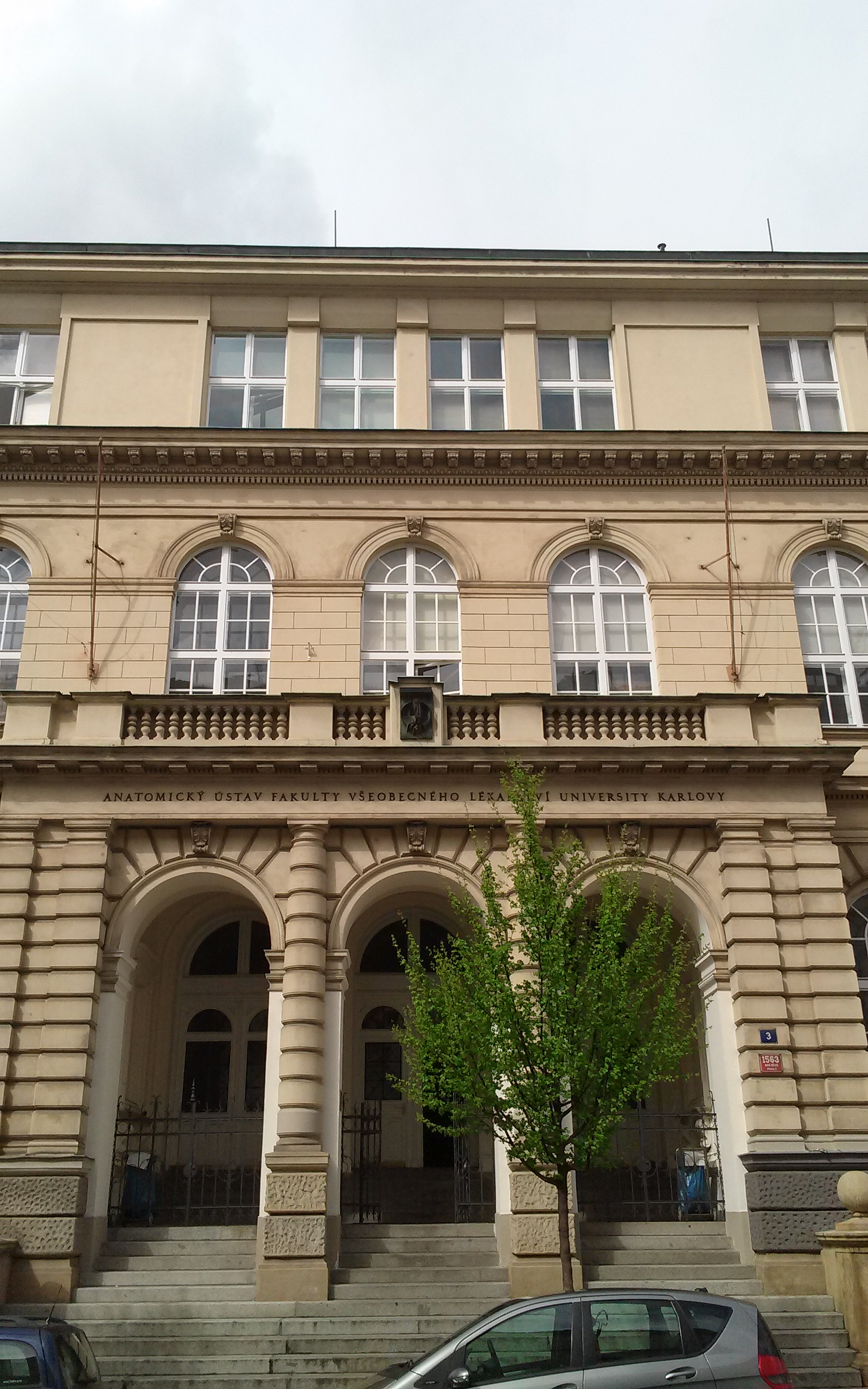
Department of Anatomy

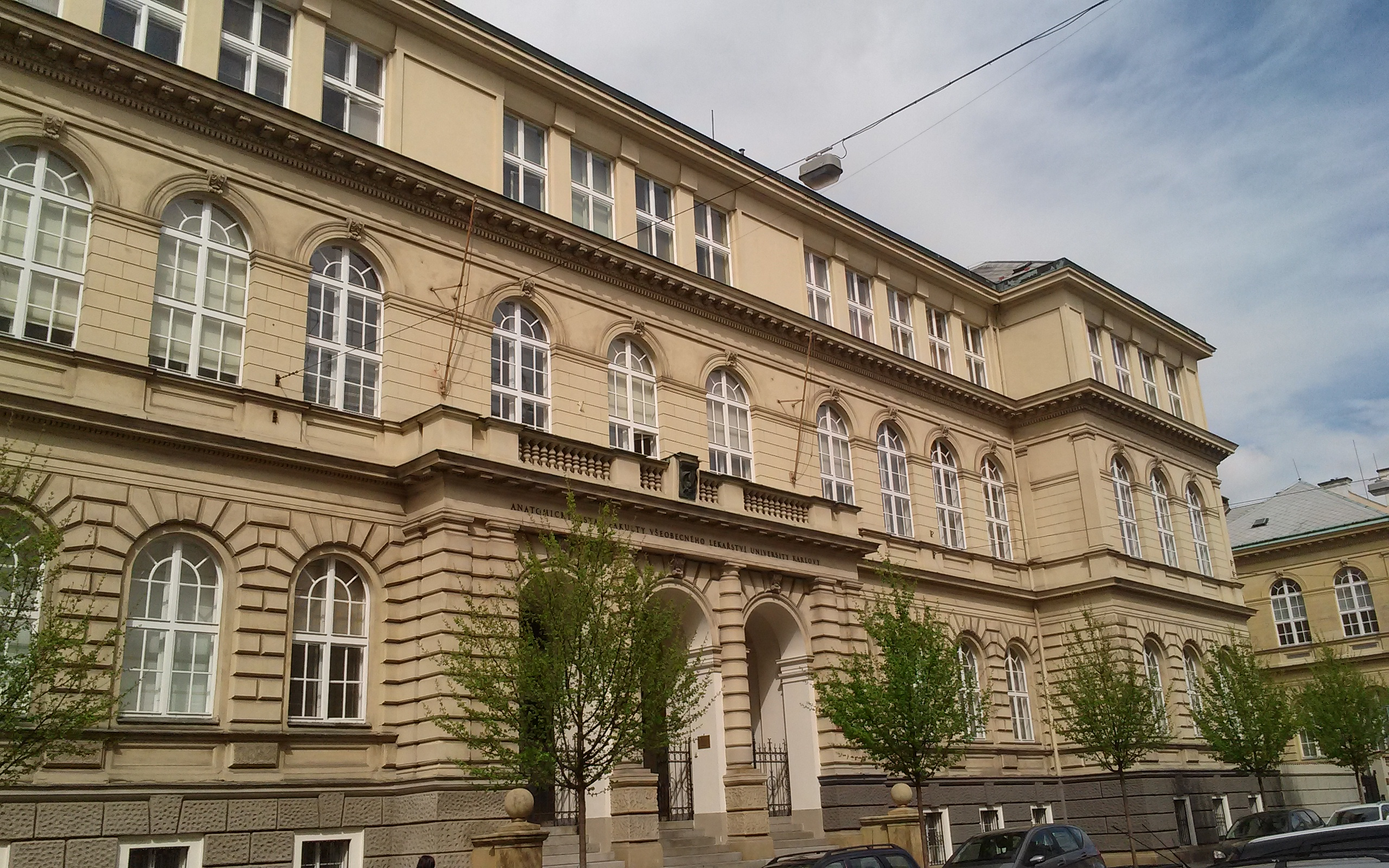
Department of Anatomy

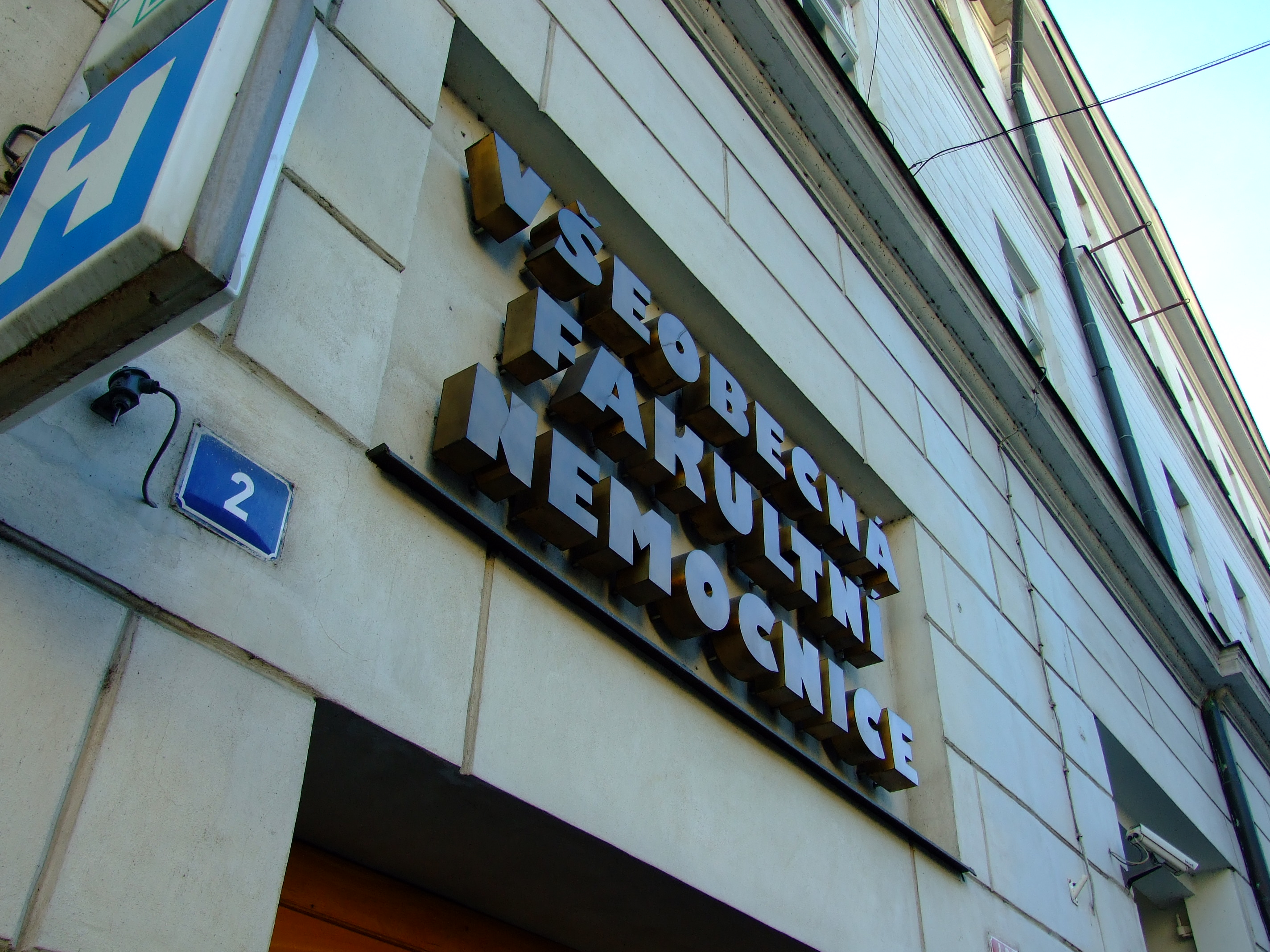
General University Hospital in Prague

== See also ==
- List of medical schools in Europe
- Medical school#Czech Republic
