= Ivan Wilhelm =

Czech nuclear physicist and university rector

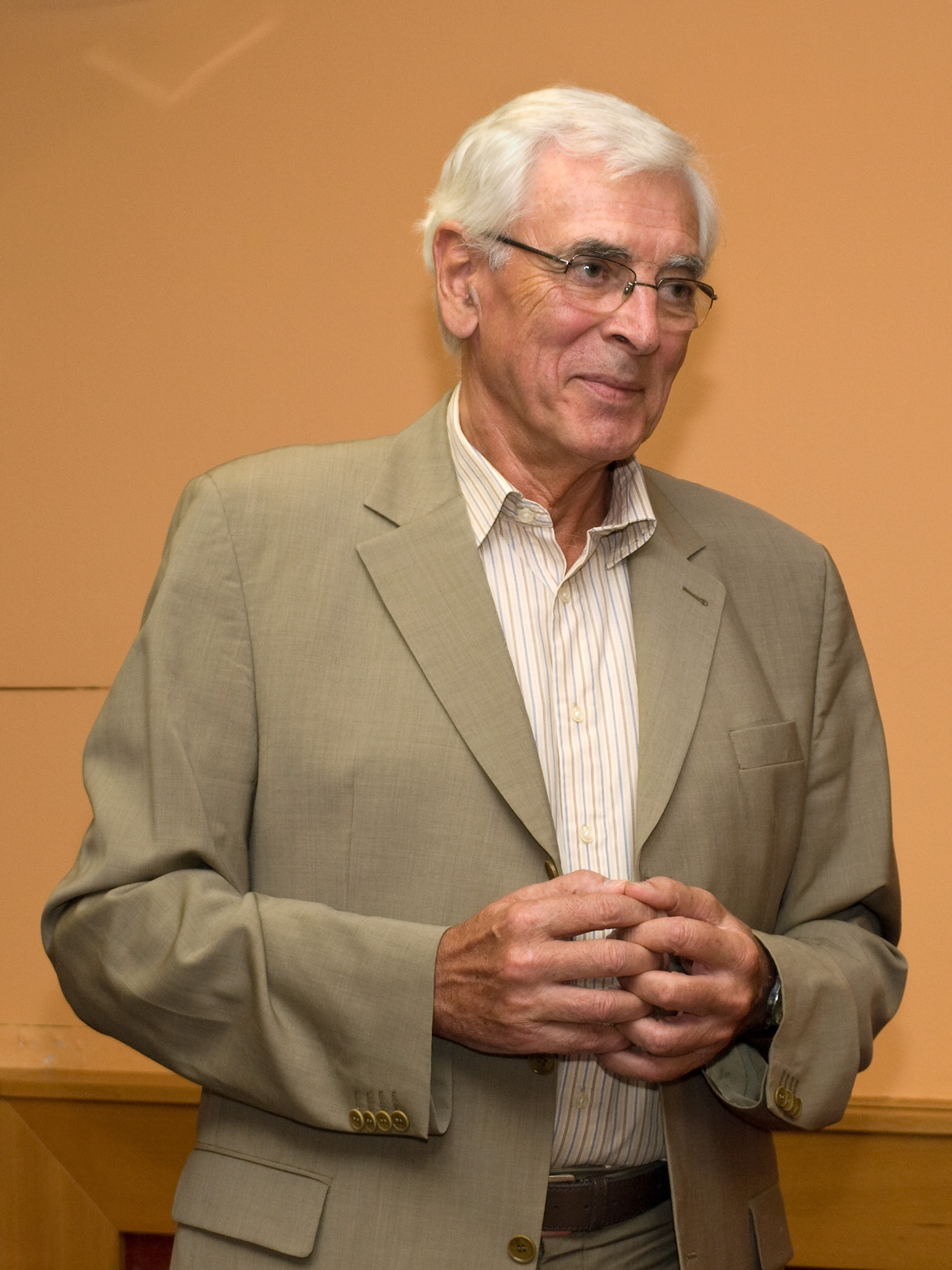
Ivan Wilhelm in June 2011

Ivan Wilhelm (1 May 1942, Trnava) is a Czech nuclear physicist and former rector of the Charles University in Prague.

Wilhelm graduated from the Faculty of Nuclear Sciences and Physical Engineering of Czech Technical University in Prague with a degree in nuclear physics. Until 1967, he also lectured there. In 1967, Wilhelm was sent to study in the United States. Since 1971, Wilhelm has been a part of the Faculty of Mathematics and Physics of Charles University in Prague.

== See also ==
- List of Charles University rectors
