= Mafra (company) =

Czech media company

Mafra, a.s.
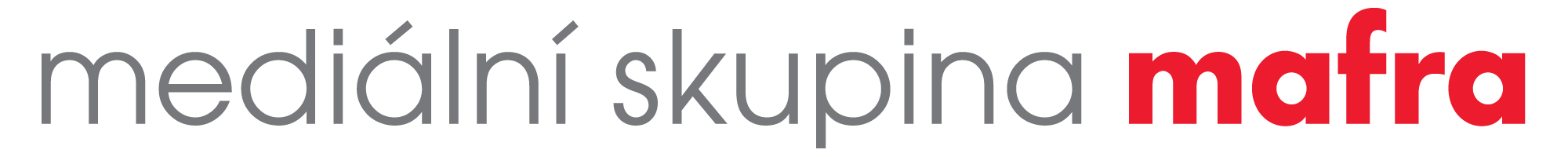

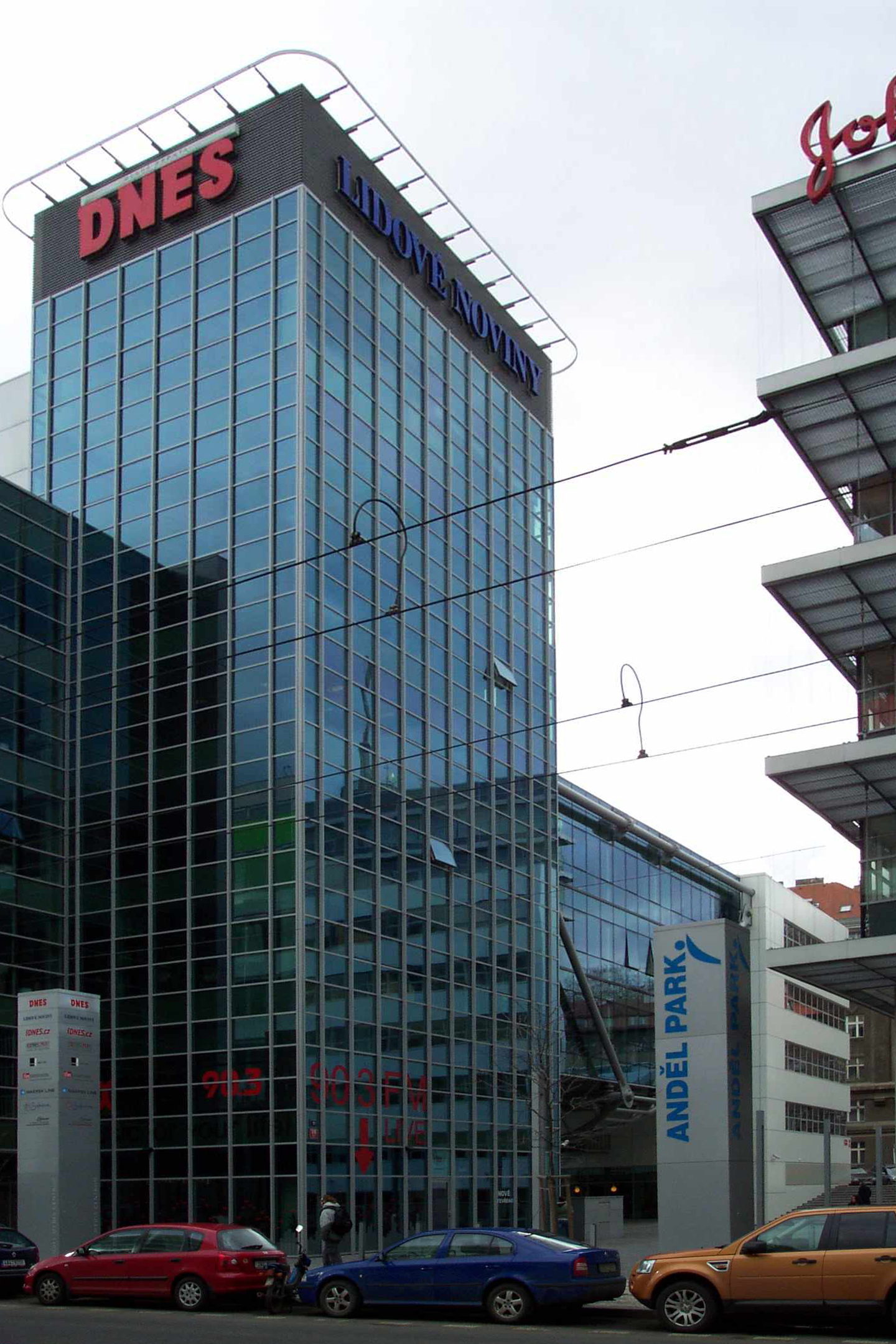
- Type: Joint-stock
- Industry: Publishing, Internet
- Founded: 31 December 1992
- Headquarters: Prague, Czech Republic
- Products: Newspapers, Magazines
- Revenue: 2,376,127,000 Czech koruna (2025)
- Operating income: −155,970,000 Czech koruna (2025)
- Net income: 867,134,000 Czech koruna (2025)
- Total assets: 3,253,659,000 Czech koruna (2020)
- Number of employees: 1,149 (2020)
- Parent: Kaprain Chemical, Cyprus
- Website: mafra.cz

MAFRA, a.s. is a Czech media company headquartered in Prague. Its portfolio includes the newspapers Mladá fronta DNES and Metro (Czech edition), the news websites iDNES.cz and Lidovky.cz, the Óčko television channels and Rádio Impuls. The company also publishes magazines and operates printing and other digital-media businesses.

Since May 2026, it has been jointly owned by Kaprain and Tymeprax, a company controlled by businessman Pavel Tykač, with each holding a 50% stake.

== History ==
Mafra was founded in Prague in 1992. In 1994, it was acquired by the German Rheinisch-Bergische Druckerei- und Verlagsgesellschaft, publisher of the Rheinische Post.

In 2005, Mafra acquired a majority stake in the Czech music television channel Óčko, marking the company's entry into television.

In 2013, Agrofert, then owned by businessman and politician Andrej Babiš, acquired Mafra from its German owner. The takeover was completed in October 2013.

During the COVID-19 pandemic, Freedom House reported that Mafra disproportionately benefited from state support.

In September 2023, Agrofert agreed to sell Mafra to Karel Pražák's Kaprain Group. Following regulatory approval, the transaction was completed on 1 February 2024.

In August 2024, Mafra ended the standalone printed edition of Lidové noviny, while its website Lidovky.cz continued operating. The newspaper's Orientace supplement became part of the Saturday edition of Mladá fronta DNES.

In November 2025, Kaprain agreed to sell a 50% stake in Mafra to Tymeprax, owned by businessman Pavel Tykač. The transaction was completed in May 2026, leaving Mafra jointly owned by Kaprain and Tymeprax, each with a 50% stake.
