= 2015 ANO 2011 leadership election =

- 28 February 2015
- Turnout: 100%
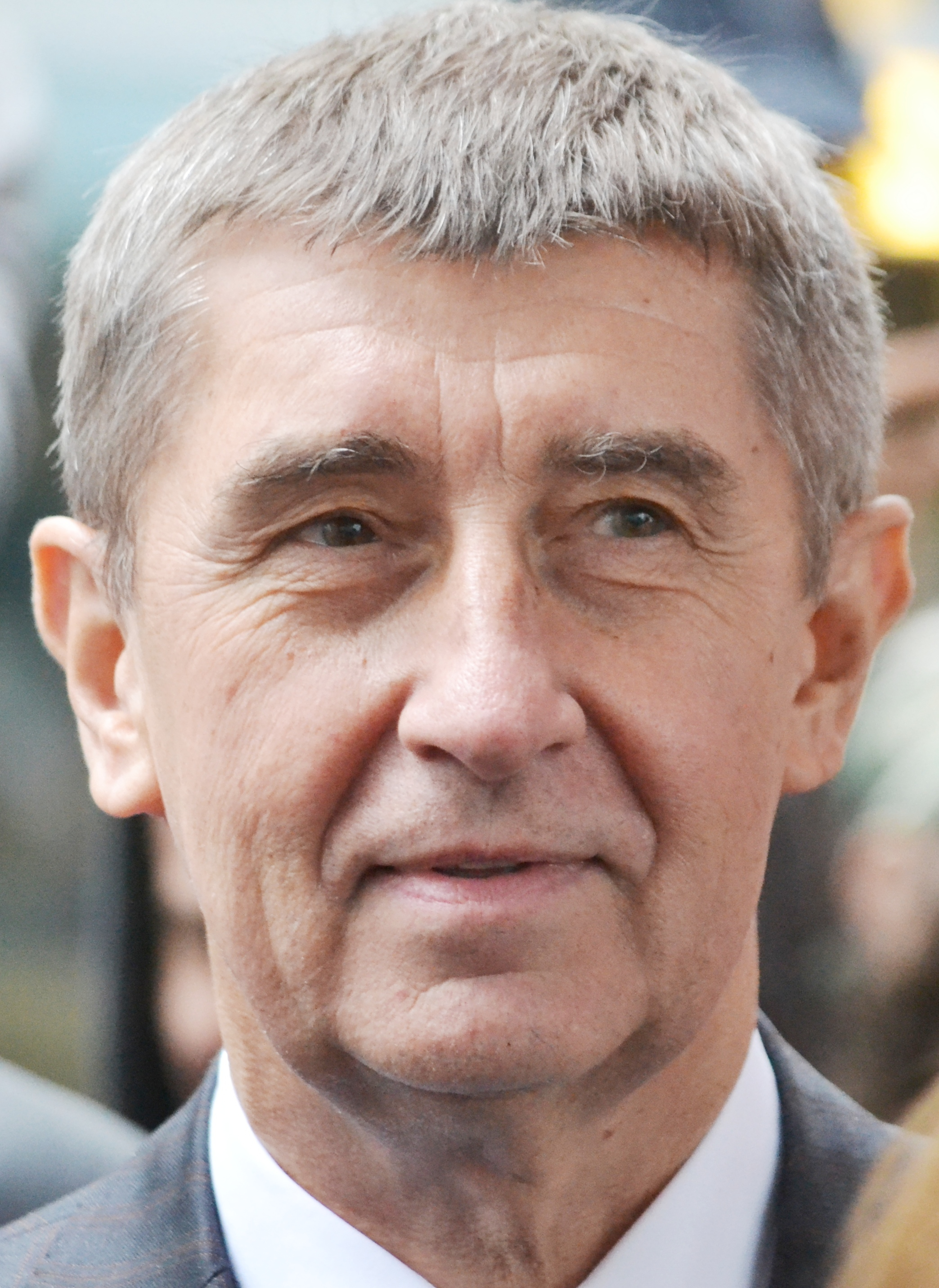
Candidate	Andrej Babiš
Electoral vote	186
Percentage	100%
leader of ANO 2011 before election
Andrej Babiš
Elected leader of ANO 2011
Andrej Babiš

A leadership election for ANO 2011 was held on 28 February 2015. Incumbent Andrej Babiš was re-elected when he received votes from all 186 delegates. Only one vote was invalid.

== Conduct ==
ANO 2011 is often called an undemocratic party, with the leadership election considered to be evidence of this. Some commentators and political rivals of ANO 2011 compared the vote to North Korean elections, noting a 100% result is something unique in democracy.

== Results ==
Candidate	Votes
Andrej Babiš	186
Against	0
Invalid/blank votes	1
Total	187
