= 2017 ANO 2011 leadership election =

- 28 February 2017
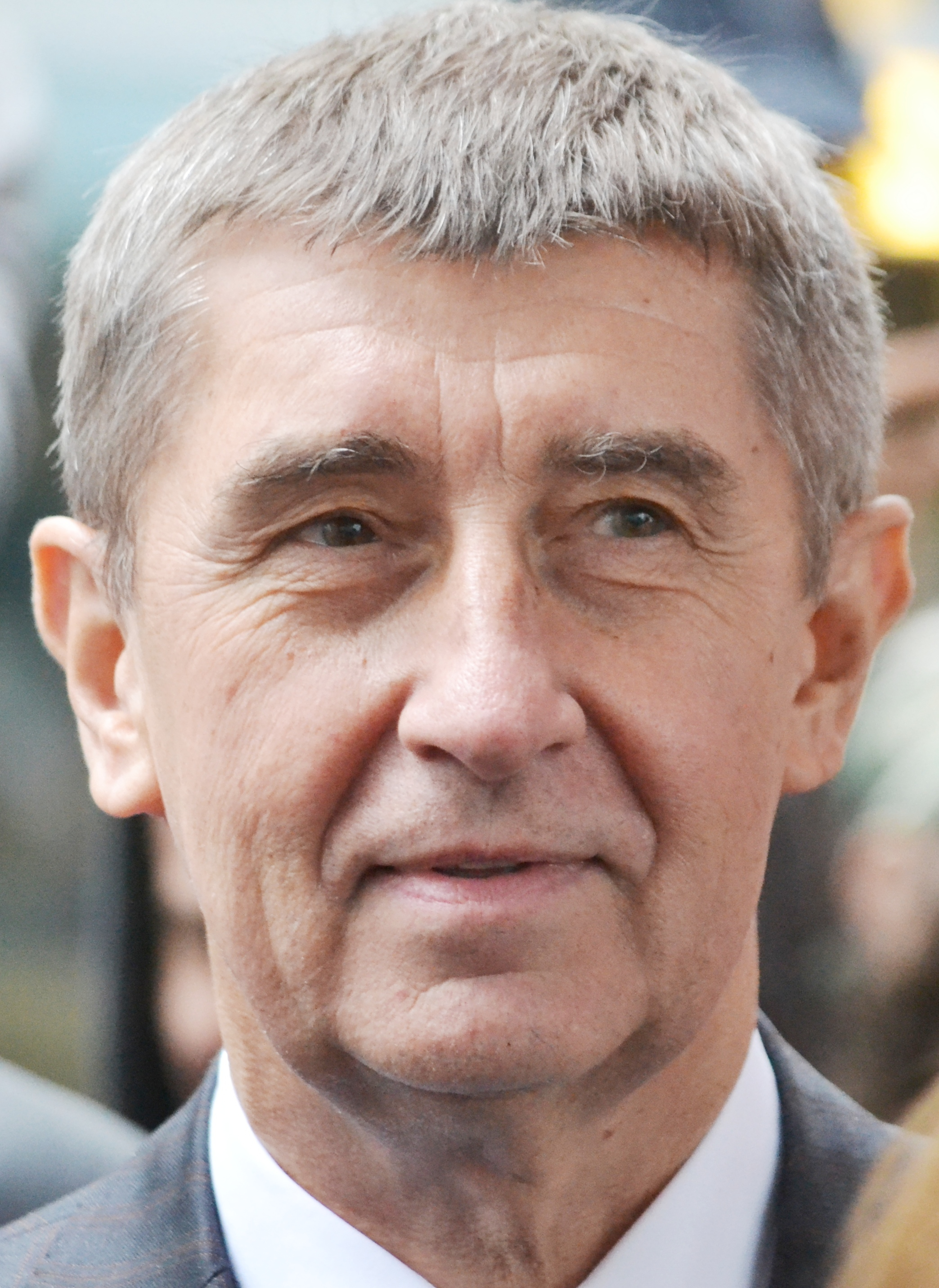
Candidate	Andrej Babiš
Electoral vote	195
Percentage	95%
leader of ANO 2011 before election
Andrej Babiš
Elected leader of ANO 2011
Andrej Babiš

A leadership election for ANO 2011 was held on 28 February 2017. Incumbent Andrej Babiš was re-elected with 195 of the 206 votes. He was the only candidate. Babiš appreciated that he didn't receive 100% of votes.

== Results ==
Candidate	Votes
Andrej Babiš	195
Against	11
Invalid/blank votes	4
Total	210
