= 2012 ANO 2011 leadership election =

- 1 August 2012
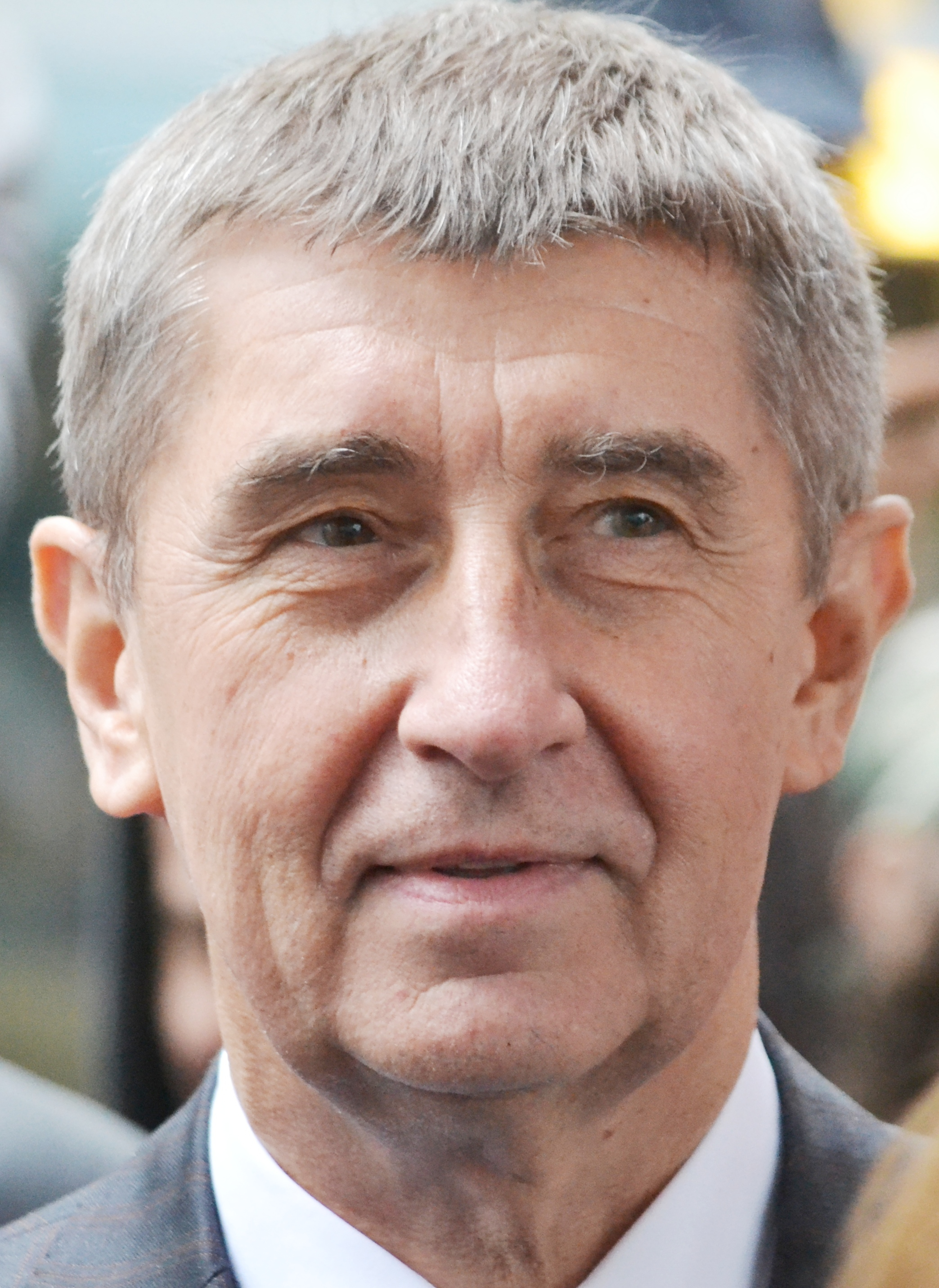
Candidate	Andrej Babiš
Electoral vote	73
Percentage	96%
leader of ANO 2011 before election
Andrej Babiš
Elected leader of ANO 2011
Andrej Babiš

A leadership election for ANO 2011 was held on 1 August 2012. Andrej Babiš was elected the first leader of the party. Babiš receive 73 votes of 76 delegates.
