= Agrofert =

Czech conglomerate holding company

Coordinates: 50°2′19.25″N 14°29′51.1″E

Agrofert, a.s.

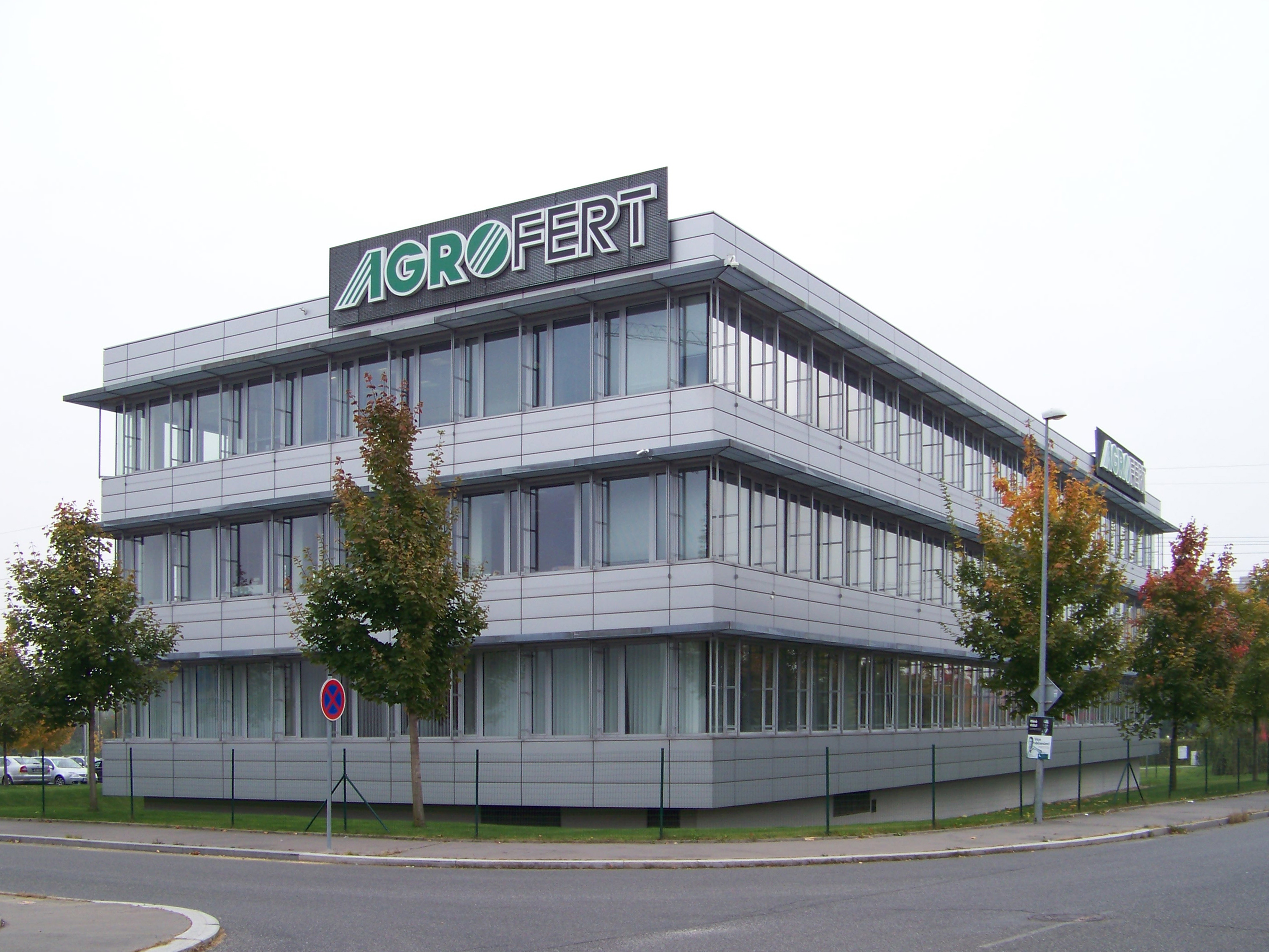
- Formerly: Agrofert Holding
- Type: Private
- Founded: January 25, 1993
- Founder: Andrej Babiš
- Headquarters: Prague, Czech Republic
- Key people: Zbyněk Průša (chairman of the board)
- Revenue: ▲CZK 212.2 billion (2025)
- Operating income: 8,258,029,000 Czech koruna (2021)
- Net income: CZK 2.2 billion (2025)
- Total assets: CZK 201.3 billion (2025)
- Owner: RSVP Trust (100%)
- Number of employees: 28,184 (2025)
- Subsidiaries: Penam; Precheza; SKW Piesteritz; Lieken; Duslo; DEZA; Fatra; Kostelecké uzeniny; Lovochemie
- Website: agrofert.cz

Agrofert is a Czech conglomerate headquartered in Prague. Its main businesses are chemicals and fertilizer production, food processing and agriculture. It also operates in forestry, machinery, transport and renewable energy. The group has businesses in more than 20 countries, mainly the Czech Republic, Slovakia, Germany, Austria and France.

Agrofert’s consolidated revenue was CZK 212.2 billion in 2025. Its chemical businesses contributed about 38% of the total, more than any other business area. The group employed 28,184 people that year, of whom 17,183 worked in the Czech Republic.

Agrofert was established in 1993 as a fertilizer-trading company owned by the Slovak company Petrimex. It later came under the ownership of businessman and politician Andrej Babiš. Babiš transferred his shares to trust funds in 2017 following changes to Czech conflict-of-interest law. The company is now owned by RSVP Trust.

== History ==
=== Origins and expansion, 1993–2009 ===
Agrofert was established in 1993 as a fertilizer-trading subsidiary of the Slovak company Petrimex. Andrej Babiš, who worked at Petrimex, helped establish and managed the Czech business. In 1995, a capital increase brought the Swiss company O.F.I. into Agrofert and reduced Petrimex’s shareholding. Babiš acquired shares in stages and was the sole owner by 2004.

During the late 1990s, Agrofert bought agricultural supply companies and expanded into chemical production through Preaches, Lovochemie and DEZA.

The group expanded abroad with the acquisition of Slovakia’s Istrochem in 2002 and Duslo in 2005. Also in 2002, Agrofert acquired a stake in Germany’s SKW Piesteritz and became its sole owner in 2006.

Agrofert entered the bakery business in 2004, when it bought Penam. The following year, it took control of Kostelecké uzeniny, in which it already held a minority stake. It also acquired a majority stake in the dairy company Olma at the end of 2008.

=== Diversification and ownership changes, 2010–2021 ===
Agrofert bought the forestry and wood-processing companies Wotan Forest and Uniles in 2011. That year, it also bought Mlékárna Hlinsko, its second dairy company after Olma.

Agrofert bought the German bakery group Lieken from Barilla in 2013. In October that year, it completed the acquisition of Mafra, publisher of Mladá fronta DNES and Lidové noviny. In February 2014, it acquired Londa, operator of Rádio Impuls and RockZone.

Babiš stepped down from the management of Agrofert in January 2014 as he prepared to become Czech finance minister. He kept ownership of the company, with Zbyněk Průša taking over as chairman. In February 2017, changes to Czech conflict-of-interest law prompted Babiš to place his shares in two trust funds, AB private trust I and AB private trust II.

In June 2019, Penam completed the acquisition of United Bakeries. The competition authority required the disposal of several bakeries as a condition of approval.

A European Commission audit published in 2021 concluded that Babiš continued to control Agrofert through the trusts and was in a conflict of interest.

=== Developments since 2022 ===
Agrofert bought Borealis’s nitrogen business in July 2023. The deal valued the business at €810 million and included fertilizer, melamine and nitrogen plants in Austria, Germany and France, with LAT Nitrogen as the largest production site.

In September 2023, Agrofert agreed to sell Mafra, Londa and Synthesia to Karel Pražák’s investment group Kaprain. The transaction was completed on 1 February 2024.

Babiš became Agrofert’s sole shareholder again in October 2025 after the shares held by the two trusts returned to him. On 20 February 2026, he transferred all shares to RSVP Trust.

Agrofert bought OCI Ammonia Holding in March 2026 from OCI Global. The purchase included an ammonia import terminal in Rotterdam, along with a distribution business. In July, the group brought its fertilizer and nitrogen companies together under a new subsidiary, AGF Nitrogen.

In September 2026, the European Commission said that the RSVP Trust arrangement did not sufficiently address Babiš’s potential conflict of interest and halted some subsidy reimbursements. Babiš denied benefiting from the company, and Agrofert said it complied with legal requirements.

== Operations ==
Agrofert has businesses in more than 20 countries. Its main activities are chemical production, food processing and agriculture. It also has interests in forestry, machinery, transport and renewable energy.

=== Chemicals ===
Chemicals are Agrofert’s largest business area by revenue. In 2025, they accounted for 38.1% of group revenue, with sales of CZK 80.7 billion. Fertilizers generated about two-thirds of chemical revenue. The chemical businesses employed 7,879 people and received CZK 5.2 billion in investment that year.

Agrofert produces fertilizers and industrial nitrogen products through Lovochemie in the Czech Republic, Duslo in Slovakia, SKW Piesteritz in Germany and LAT Nitrogen. These companies became part of the new AGF Nitrogen subholding in July 2026. It also includes GreenChem, AGF Ammonia Holding and the research institute VUCHT.

Other chemical businesses are DEZA, Precheza and Fatra. They produce aromatic chemicals, titanium dioxide pigments and plastic products.

=== Food processing ===
Agrofert’s food businesses are focused on bakery products, meat, dairy products and edible oils. Group's notable companies are Penam and Lieken, meat processor Kostelecké uzeniny, poultry producers Vodňanská drůbež, and dairy companies Olma and Mlékárna Hlinsko. Food processing accounted for 31.3% of group revenue in 2025, with sales of CZK 66.3 billion.

=== Agriculture and other activities ===
Agrofert’s agricultural businesses grow crops, raise livestock, produce seeds and animal feed, and trade in agricultural commodities. Its agricultural supply companies also provide fertilizers, crop-protection products, storage and other services to farmers. Agriculture and primary production accounted for 20.2% of group revenue in 2025.

The group also sells and services agricultural and other machinery, operates forestry and wood-processing businesses, and provides transport and logistics services. Its fuels businesses include biodiesel and bioethanol production.

== Research and development ==
At Agrofert’s subsidiary SKW Piesteritz, researchers test fertilizer additives to find ways of keeping more nitrogen available to crops. A study published in 2023 tested its products over two wheat-growing seasons in northern Germany. One additive reduced emissions of nitrous oxide, a greenhouse gas, from the applied fertilizer by about 75% compared with untreated urea. Combining two additives also improved wheat yields and the amount of nitrogen taken up by the crop.

SKW also developed ATMOWELL, a system that treats cattle-house floors to reduce ammonia emissions. The German Agricultural Society awarded it a silver medal at EuroTier 2024, describing the system as ready for commercial use.
