= Mladá fronta Dnes =

Czech newspaper

- The front page of Mladá fronta Dnes on 16 May 2012
- Type: Daily newspaper
- Format: Berliner
- Owner: Mafra
- Editor: Jaroslav Plesl
- Founded: 1945; 81 years ago
- Language: Czech
- Headquarters: Prague
- Website: mfdnes.cz

Mladá fronta DNES (lit. 'Young Front Today'), also known as MF DNES, is a Czech national daily newspaper published by MAFRA. It was established in its present form in 1990 as the successor to Mladá fronta, a newspaper founded in 1945. MF DNES is one of the most widely read newspapers in the Czech Republic and, according to data for 2026, was the country's most-read general-news daily, with an average readership of about 369,000 per issue.

The newspaper has been published by MAFRA since the company's formation in the early 1990s. MAFRA was acquired by Andrej Babiš's Agrofert group in 2013 and sold to Kaprain in 2024. Since May 2026, MAFRA has been jointly owned by Kaprain and Tymeprax, an investment company controlled by Czech businessman Pavel Tykač.

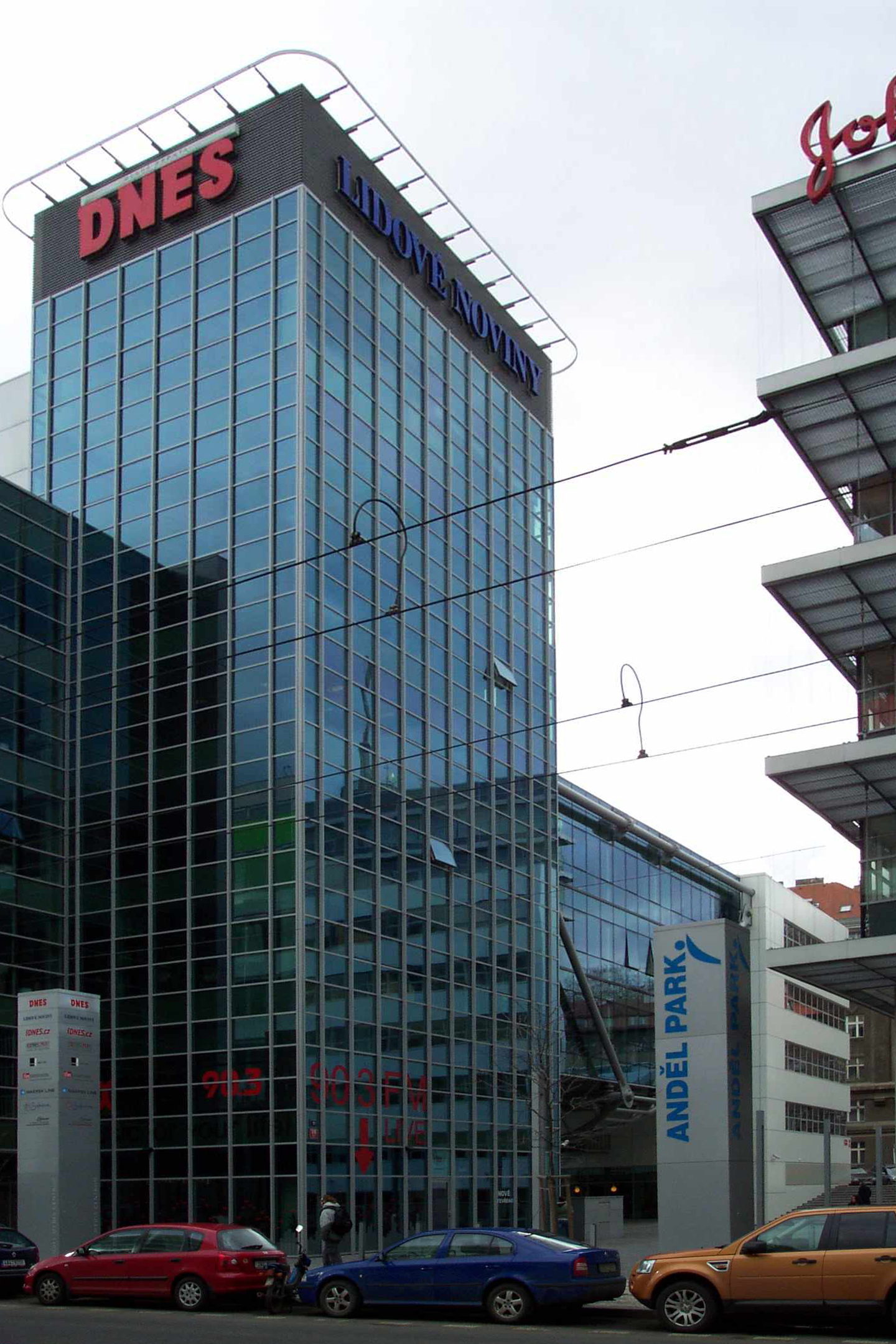
Headquarters of Mladá fronta Dnes and Lidové Noviny in Prague

== History ==
Mladá fronta DNES traces its origins to the newspaper Mladá fronta, which was first published on 9 May 1945. From the early 1950s, Mladá fronta was associated with the Czechoslovak youth organization, and in 1970 it became an organ of the Socialist Union of Youth. Following the Velvet Revolution, a group of its journalists established the publishing company MaF and left the existing publisher. The first issue under the name Mladá fronta DNES was published on 1 September 1990.

At the end of 1991, MaF joined with the French publishing company Socpresse, part of the Hersant group, to establish MAFRA. In 1994, the German publisher Rheinisch-Bergische Druckerei- und Verlagsgesellschaft, publisher of the Rheinische Post, acquired MAFRA and subsequently developed it into one of the country's largest media groups.

In June 2013, Andrej Babiš's Agrofert group agreed to acquire MAFRA from its German owner. The purchase attracted attention because Babiš was simultaneously a major businessman and the leader of the political movement ANO 2011. Concerns about the newspaper's editorial independence accompanied the change of ownership, and editor-in-chief Robert Čásenský and several senior journalists subsequently left the newspaper.

Agrofert sold MAFRA to the investment group Kaprain of businessman Karel Pražák in a transaction completed on 1 February 2024. On 29 May 2026, Tymeprax, an investment company controlled by businessman Pavel Tykač, acquired a 50% stake in MAFRA, while Kaprain retained the remaining half.

== See also ==
- List of newspapers in the Czech Republic
- Concentration of media ownership in the Czech Republic
