= Radio Impuls (Czech Republic) =

Private radio station

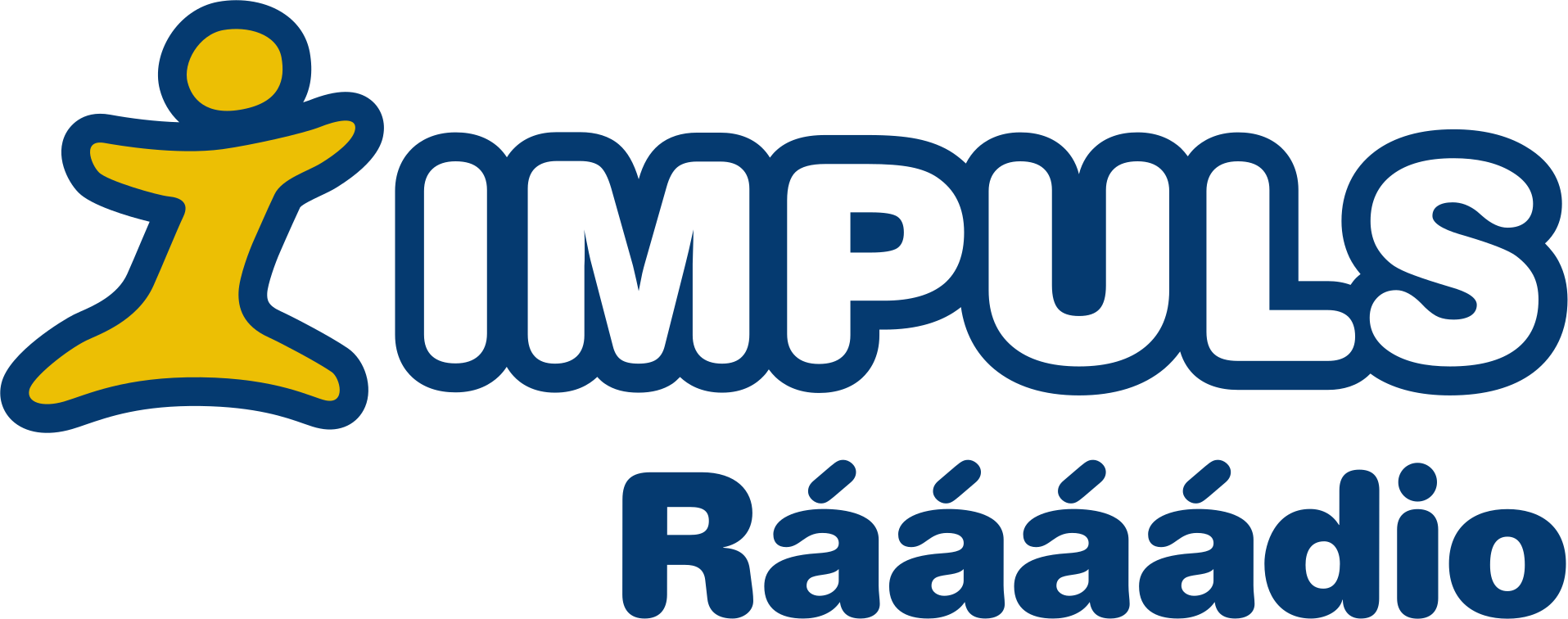

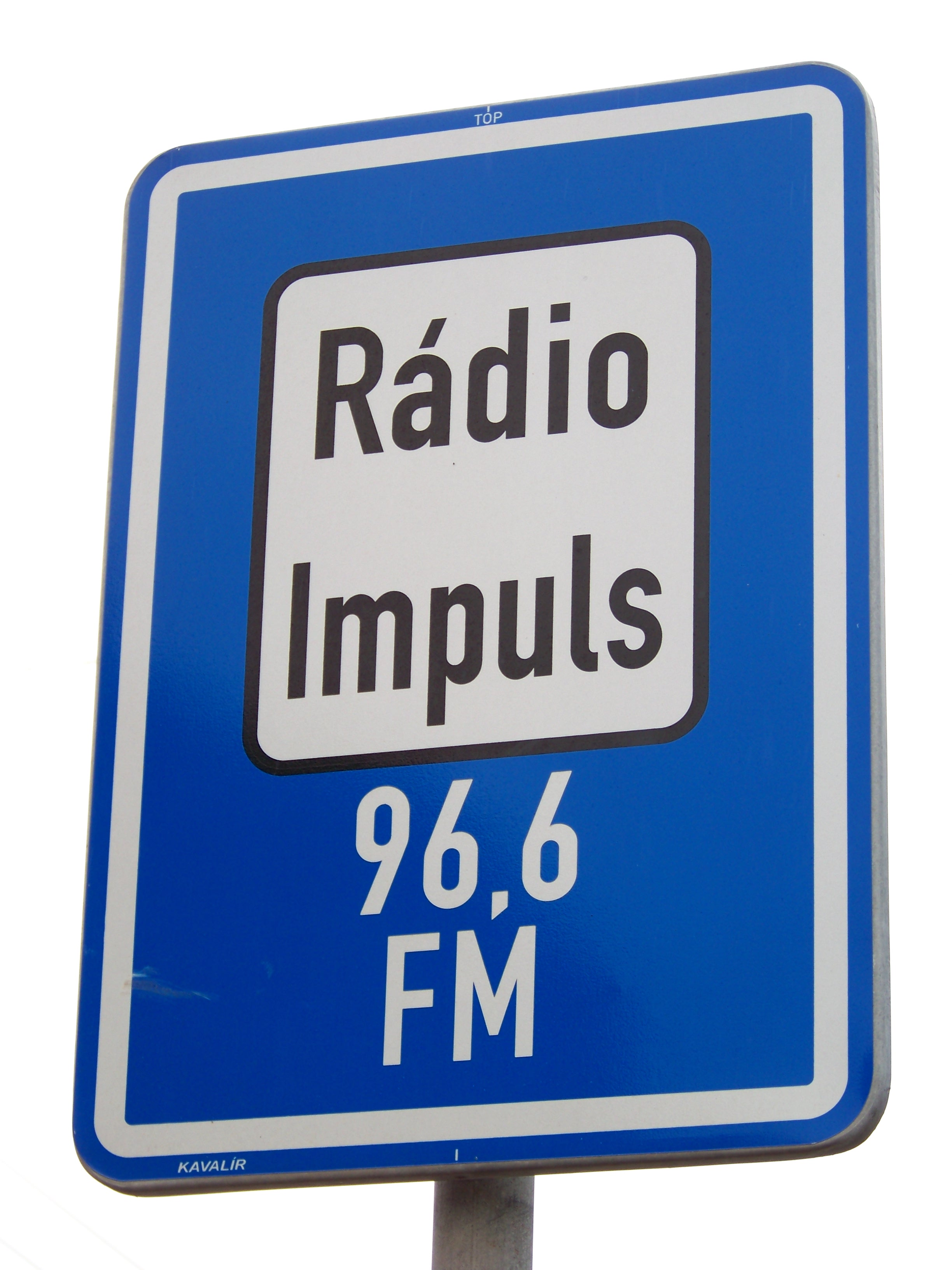
- Road sign of Radio Impuls in Prague, the Czech Republic.
- Prague, Czechia; Czech Republic
- Frequency: 96.6 MHz (FM)

Programming
- Language: Czech

Ownership
- Owner: Kaprain group

Links
- Website: impuls.cz

Radio Impuls is a private radio station founded in the Czech Republic in 1999, when it replaced the national Czech station Rádio Alfa, which lost its license. As of late 2014, it was the most popular radio station in the country by number of listeners. From 2014 to 2023, it was owned by the Agrofert group, a company owned by Andrej Babiš, the second richest man and former Prime Minister of the Czech Republic. Since 1 September 2023, it has been owned by the Kaprain group, an investment company owned by businessman Karel Pražák.

The station broadcasts mostly Czech music, news, traffic information, and entertainment. In 2014, the company launched a second station called Czech Impuls, which mainly plays Czech songs, mostly from the 1960s to the 1980s.
