= Andrej Babiš =

Prime Minister of the Czech Republic (2017–2021; since 2025)

Andrej Babiš MP
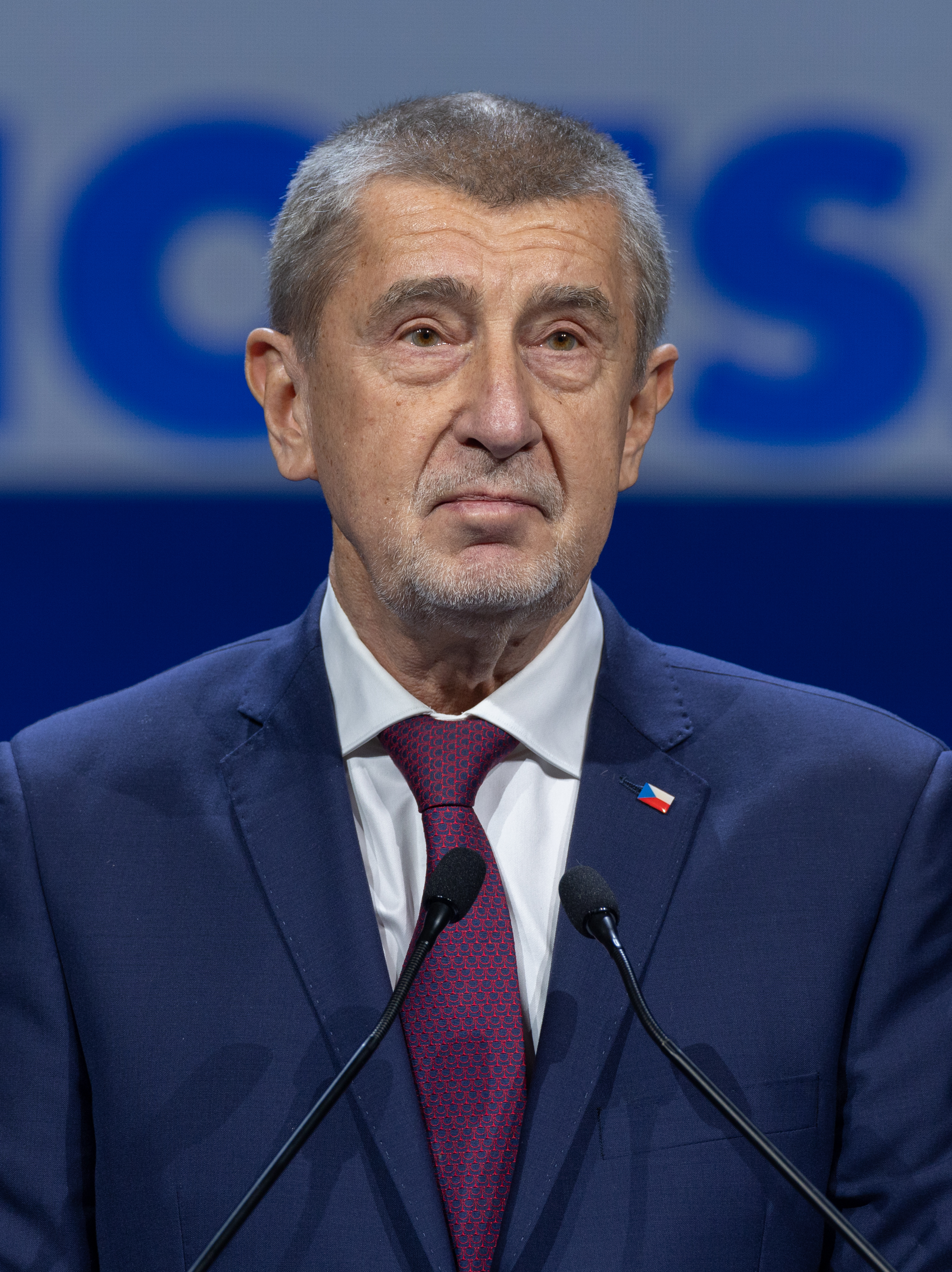
- Babiš in 2025

Prime Minister of the Czech Republic
- Incumbent
- Assumed office 9 December 2025
- President: Petr Pavel
- Deputy: See list: Karel Havlíček; Alena Schillerová; Jaromír Zůna; Petr Macinka
- Preceded by: Petr Fiala
- In office 6 December 2017 – 28 November 2021
- President: Miloš Zeman
- Deputy: See list: Karel Havlíček (2019–2021); Richard Brabec (2017–2019); Martin Stropnický (2017–2018); Jan Hamáček; Alena Schillerová
- Preceded by: Bohuslav Sobotka
- Succeeded by: Petr Fiala

Leader of ANO 2011
- Incumbent
- Assumed office 11 May 2012
- Preceded by: Position established

First Deputy Prime Minister of the Czech Republic
- In office 29 January 2014 – 24 May 2017
- Prime Minister: Bohuslav Sobotka
- Preceded by: Jan Fischer
- Succeeded by: Richard Brabec

Minister of Finance
- In office 29 January 2014 – 24 May 2017
- Prime Minister: Bohuslav Sobotka
- Preceded by: Jan Fischer
- Succeeded by: Ivan Pilný

Member of the Chamber of Deputies
- Incumbent
- Assumed office 26 October 2013

Personal details
- Born: 2 September 1954 (age 72) Bratislava, Czechoslovakia
- Citizenship: Slovakia; Czech Republic
- Party: ANO (since 2012)
- Other political affiliations: Communist Party of Slovakia (1980–1989)
- Spouse(s): Beata Adamovičová (m. 1990, div. 2000s) Monika Herodesová (m. 2017; sep. 2024)
- Children: 4
- Education: University of Economics, Bratislava
- Occupation: Businessman; politician
- Andrej Babiš's voice Babiš discussing Czech Republic–United States relations during a meeting with Donald Trump; Recorded 7 March 2019

Andrej Babiš (Note: Czech pronunciation: [ˈandrɛj ˈbabɪʃ]) (born 2 September 1954) is a Czech politician and businessman who has been the prime minister of the Czech Republic since December 2025, having previously served as prime minister from 2017 to 2021. Prior to that, he was the minister of finance and deputy prime minister from 2014 to 2017. A populist, Babiš has led the ANO 2011 political party since he founded it in 2012.

Born in Bratislava, Babiš moved to the Czech Republic in the early 1990s. During a lengthy business career, he became one of the wealthiest individuals in the Czech Republic, with an estimated net worth of about $4.04 billion according to Bloomberg in November 2020. In September 2026, Forbes estimated his net worth to be $4.2 billion. Babiš made most of his fortune as the founder and owner of Agrofert, one of the country's largest holding companies.

On 6 December 2017, Babiš was appointed prime minister of the Czech Republic, after ANO won the largest share of the vote in the 2017 Czech parliamentary election. When he took office, he was the oldest and wealthiest person ever to become Czech prime minister, as well as the first from a party other than the Civic Democratic Party or the Social Democratic Party. Additionally, Babiš was also the first prime minister born outside the Czech Republic, the first to hold dual citizenship, and the first whose native language is not Czech.

Babiš's political allies during his time as prime minister were President Miloš Zeman, the Czech Social Democratic Party, and the Communist Party. His administration raised the retirement age and reduced pensions, while increasing child tax credits and the salaries of senior politicians. Major political events of his term include the expulsion of over 80 Russian diplomats and resident spies following the disclosure of Russian involvement in the 2014 Vrbětice explosions, and the COVID-19 pandemic, which killed around 35,000 people in the Czech Republic, triggering criticism of the government's response. His time in office was also marked by legal disputes with the European Commission due to accusations of conflict of interest and allegations of EU subsidy fraud. Babiš was succeeded as prime minister by Petr Fiala on 17 December 2021, following the 2021 election. Babiš was a candidate in the 2023 Czech presidential election and lost in the second round to Petr Pavel. He led his ANO movement into the 2025 election as its nominee for prime minister, in which the party placed first with 34.5% of the votes. On 27 October 2025, he was formally tasked by President Pavel to form a government. After forming a coalition government with SPD and a new right-wing party Motorists for Themselves (AUTO), Babiš was appointed prime minister on 9 December. His cabinet took power on 15 December 2025.

Following allegations that an anonymous company he controlled unlawfully received a €2M subsidy from the European Regional Development Fund, Babiš was investigated by both the Czech police and the European Anti-Fraud Office (OLAF) from 2015 to 2017. He was stripped of his parliamentary immunity and formally charged on 9 October 2017. He was acquitted of the charges in January 2023, but the verdict was overturned and remanded in November 2023. Babiš has received sustained criticism over a number of issues, including alleged conflicts of interest, his past role in the StB, and allegations of intimidating political opponents. Babiš remains one of the most popular and divisive politicians in the Czech Republic.

== Early life and career ==
Andrej Babiš was born on 2 September 1954 in Bratislava, Czechoslovakia (now Slovakia), to a Slovak father from Hlohovec and a Carpathian German mother from Yasinia, now Zakarpattia Oblast, Ukraine. His father, a diplomat and member of the Communist Party of Czechoslovakia (KSČ), represented Czechoslovakia during the negotiation of the General Agreement on Tariffs and Trade (GATT) in Geneva and as a consultant at the United Nations. On his mother's side, he is the nephew of Ervin and Viera Scheibner.

Babiš spent part of his childhood abroad and was educated in Paris and Geneva. He continued his studies at a gymnasium and the University of Economics in Bratislava, where he studied international trade. In 1978, after graduating, he joined the Slovak state-controlled international trading company Chemapol Bratislava, which later became Petrimex. In 1985, he was appointed as the organisation's representative in Morocco. He joined the Communist Party of Czechoslovakia in 1980. During the 1980s, he was an agent for the Czechoslovak state security service (StB). Babiš denies knowingly being an agent of StB, but his legal challenges against the Slovak National Memory Institute were unsuccessful. It is alleged that he was also in contact with the Soviet KGB.

== Business career ==
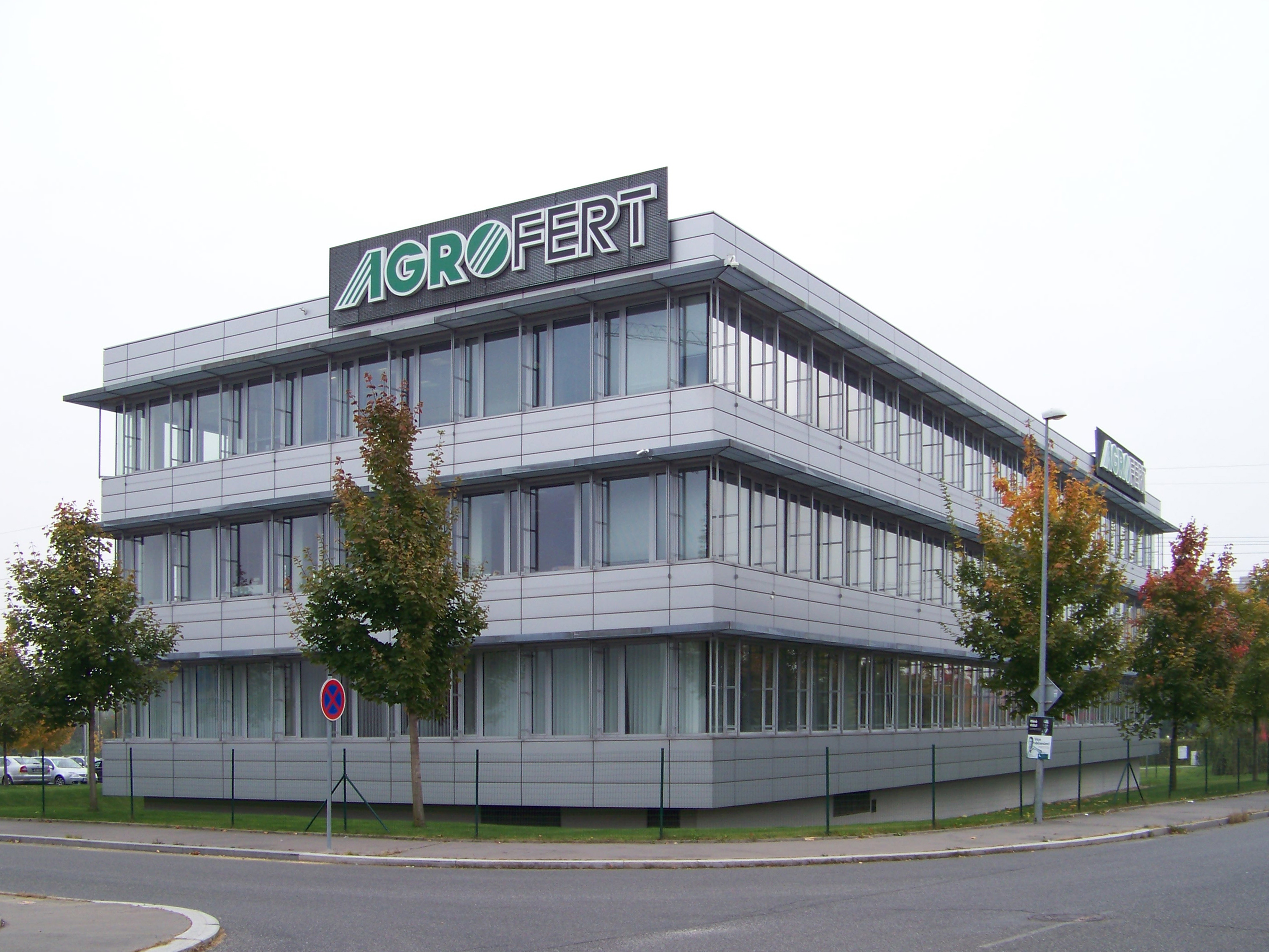
Headquarters of Agrofert in Chodov, Prague

Babiš returned to Czechoslovakia from Morocco in 1991, after the Velvet Revolution, and settled in the Czech Republic after the dissolution of Czechoslovakia.

In January 1993, Babiš became managing director of Agrofert, a newly established Petrimex subsidiary operating in the Czech Republic. He had suggested establishing Agrofert while he was a director at Petrimex, during which time Agrofert was recapitalised by OFI, a company of unknown ownership based in Baar, Switzerland, which took control of Agrofert from Petrimex. Petrimex later fired Babiš and unsuccessfully sued him for allowing the firm's stake in Agrofert to be diluted. Soon thereafter, Babiš emerged as the 100% owner of Agrofert. The source of the initial financing for Babiš's takeover of Agrofert from Petrimex remained undisclosed as of the start of 2016, although Babiš has said that the money came from his former schoolmates in Switzerland.

Babiš gradually developed Agrofert into one of the largest companies in the country, starting as a wholesale and trading firm, but later acquiring various agricultural, food processing, and chemical companies. In 2011, Agrofert Holding consisted of more than 230 companies, mainly in the Czech Republic, Slovakia, and Germany. It is the fourth largest company in the Czech Republic by revenue, exceeding CZK 117 billion. The history of Agrofert, detailed in a book by the journalist Tomáš Pergler, is closely linked to its control of the Czech petrochemicals industry. One reviewer of the book said the account "captures much of what has led Czechs to the conviction that they live in a corrupted, clientist country – and (paradoxically) then to vote for the ANO movement." Upon entering politics, Babiš resigned as CEO, but nevertheless remained sole owner until February 2017, when he was legally obliged to put his companies in a trust to remain as Minister of Finance.

While Babiš's business activities initially focused mainly on agriculture, he later acquired a large empire of media companies. In 2013, Agrofert purchased the company MAFRA, publisher of two of the biggest Czech newspapers, Lidové noviny and Mladá fronta DNES, and operator of the Óčko television company. Agrofert also owned Radio Impuls, the most listened to radio station in the Czech Republic (as of late 2014). These acquisitions have led critics to question Babiš's political motives, amid accusations that he was amassing too much power, and that the media outlets he controls publish sympathetic coverage of him.

As of 15 October 2025, Babiš is again the sole owner of Agrofert. On 20 February 2026, Babiš transferred ownership of the company to the private RSVP Trust fund.

== Early political career ==
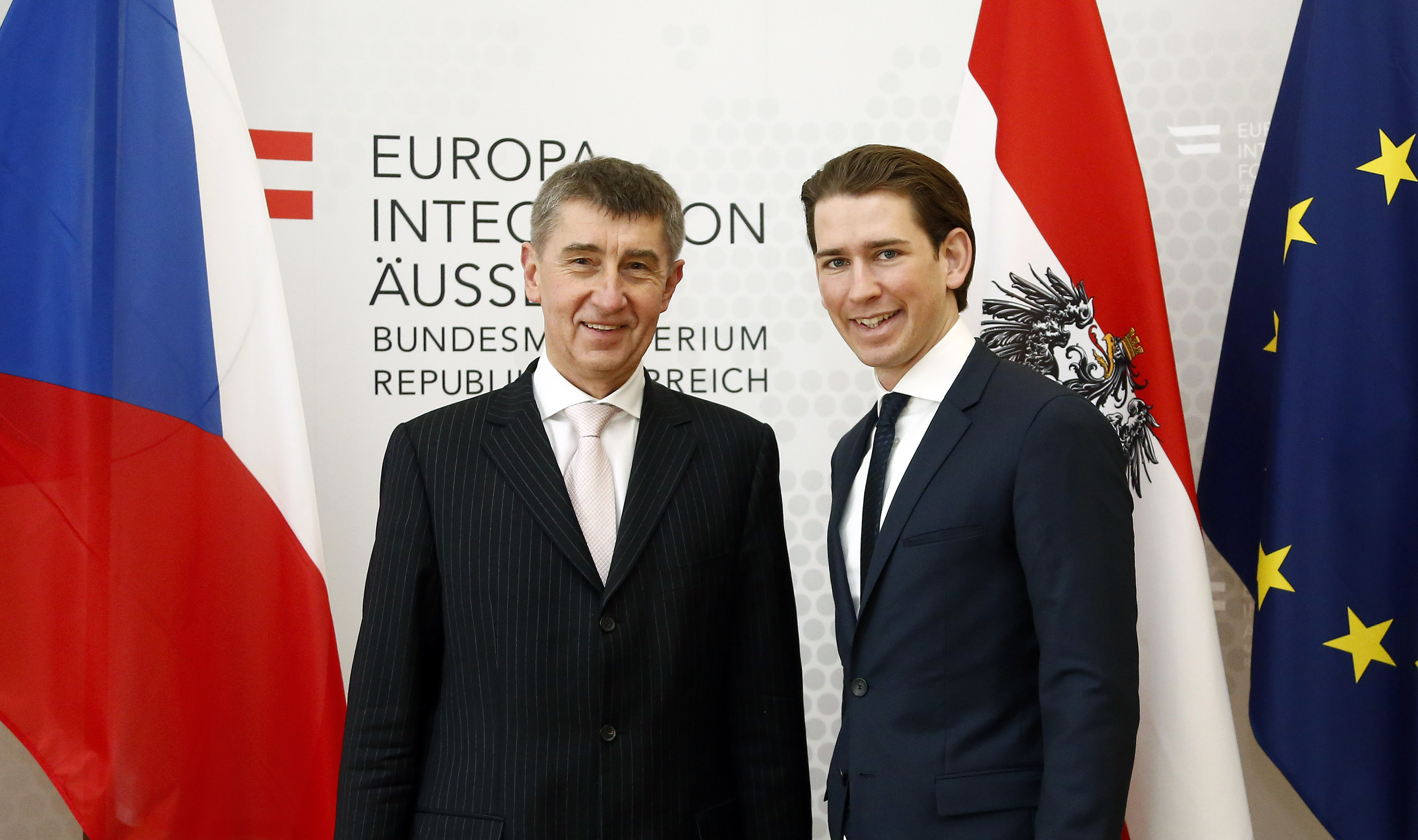
Babiš with Austrian Foreign Minister Sebastian Kurz in February 2015

In 2011, Babiš founded his party, ANO, "to fight corruption and other ills in the country's political system." The party contested the parliamentary elections in October 2013 and emerged as the second largest party, with 47 seats (of 200) in the Chamber of Deputies. The American political consulting firm, Penn Schoen Berland, was credited with the party's successful result.

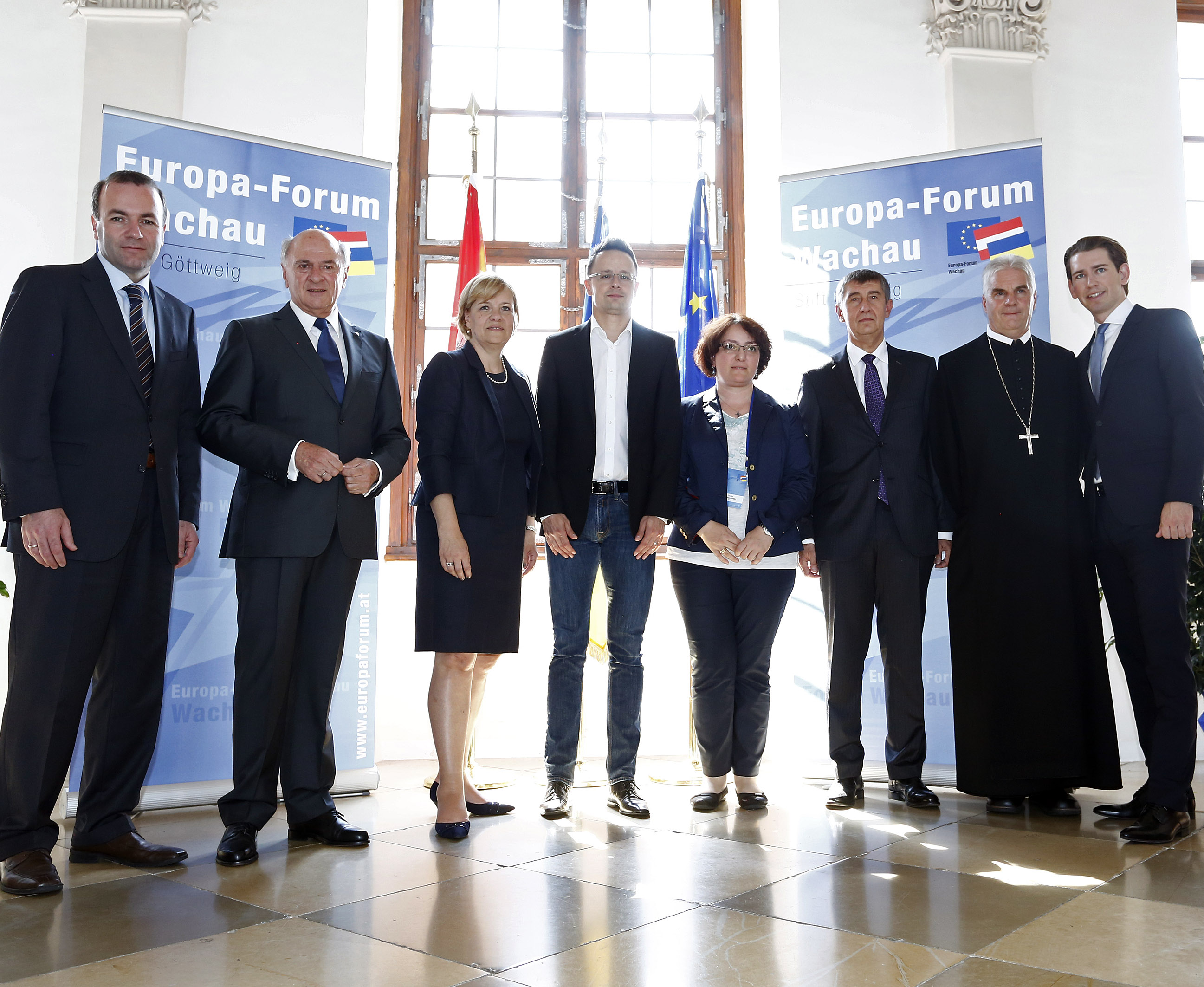
Europa-Forum Wachau in June 2015

In the subsequent coalition government, formed of the Social Democrats, ANO, and the Christian Democrats, Babiš served as the Minister of Finance. During his tenure in this role, Babiš introduced controversial policies such as electronic registration of sales, known as EET, proposed reverse charging of value-added tax, and VAT control statement for companies. His critics claimed he was tightening regulations on small and medium-sized enterprises and sole proprietorships while turning a blind eye to big corporations, to the benefit of his own Agrofert holding. During this time, he stated many times that he would like to be the next prime minister if ANO led the government.

In May 2015, after the government's decision to extend reduced taxation of biofuels (a segment of the fuel market controlled significantly by companies in the Agrofert portfolio), the opposition initiated a vote of no confidence against the cabinet. On 26 May 2015, while speaking to the Chamber of Deputies, Babiš said that he was forced to enter politics because of "corrupted opposition" (referring to ODS) that "created him". In November 2016, Babiš criticized alleged links among CEFC China Energy, the Czech Social Democratic Party, and Czech Prime Minister Bohuslav Sobotka, saying that CEFC's focus on private Czech companies "brings no yield to the Czech Republic."

=== European migrant crisis ===
In September 2015, Deputy Prime Minister Babiš called for NATO intervention against human trafficking in the Mediterranean. After talks on the migrant crisis with NATO Secretary General Jens Stoltenberg, Babiš said that "NATO is not interested in refugees, although Turkey, a NATO member, is their entrance gate to Europe and smugglers operate on Turkish territory."

Babiš rejected the European Union's refugee quotas, saying: "I will not accept refugee quotas [for the Czech Republic]. ... We must react to the needs and fears of the citizens of our country. We must guarantee the security of Czech citizens. Even if we are punished by sanctions." After the 2016 Berlin truck attack, he said that "unfortunately... [Angela Merkel's "open-door" migration] policy is responsible for this dreadful act. It was she who let migrants enter Germany and the whole of Europe in uncontrolled waves, without papers, therefore without knowing who they really are."

=== 2017 government crisis ===
Andrej Babiš was sacked from the government by Prime Minister Bohuslav Sobotka on 24 May 2017 after a month-long coalition crisis triggered by allegations that Babiš avoided paying taxes as CEO of Agrofert in 2012.

== First premiership (2017–2021) ==
Following the 2017 Czech parliamentary election to the Chamber of Deputies, in which ANO won with 29% of the vote, and won 78 out of 200 seats, President Miloš Zeman asked Babiš to form a government. The Civic Democratic Party and other parties refused to join a coalition government with Babiš, citing the ongoing criminal investigation into alleged EU subsidy fraud. As a result, on 27 October 2017, Babiš announced that he would try to form a minority government. Both Freedom and Direct Democracy (SPD) and the Communist Party of Bohemia and Moravia expressed their willingness to join the government, but were rejected by Babiš.

On 6 December 2017, Babiš was appointed Prime Minister of the Czech Republic. He assumed office on 13 December 2017, when his government took full control of the executive government. He became the first prime minister of the Czech Republic to be charged with a crime by the Czech police and prosecutor, as well as both the oldest and the wealthiest prime minister in the country's history, and the first prime minister from a party other than ODS and ČSSD.

During his first days in office, he attended the European Council summit dealing with fiscal responsibilities, Brexit, and the 2015 European migrant crisis, while also speaking on the phone with new Polish Prime Minister Mateusz Morawiecki about the European Commission's invocation of the Article 7. His government carried out personnel changes at the ministries, České dráhy, and the Správa železnic (railway infrastructure administration).

On 16 January 2018, Babiš's cabinet lost a vote of no confidence in the Chamber of Deputies by 117 votes to 78.

In February 2018, his cabinet approved the European Fiscal Compact and sent it to the Chamber of Deputies for further approval. They also proposed changes to the Civil Service Act, which has been the subject of controversy since it was passed in 2015 by Bohuslav Sobotka's government, in which Babiš served as Minister of Finance.

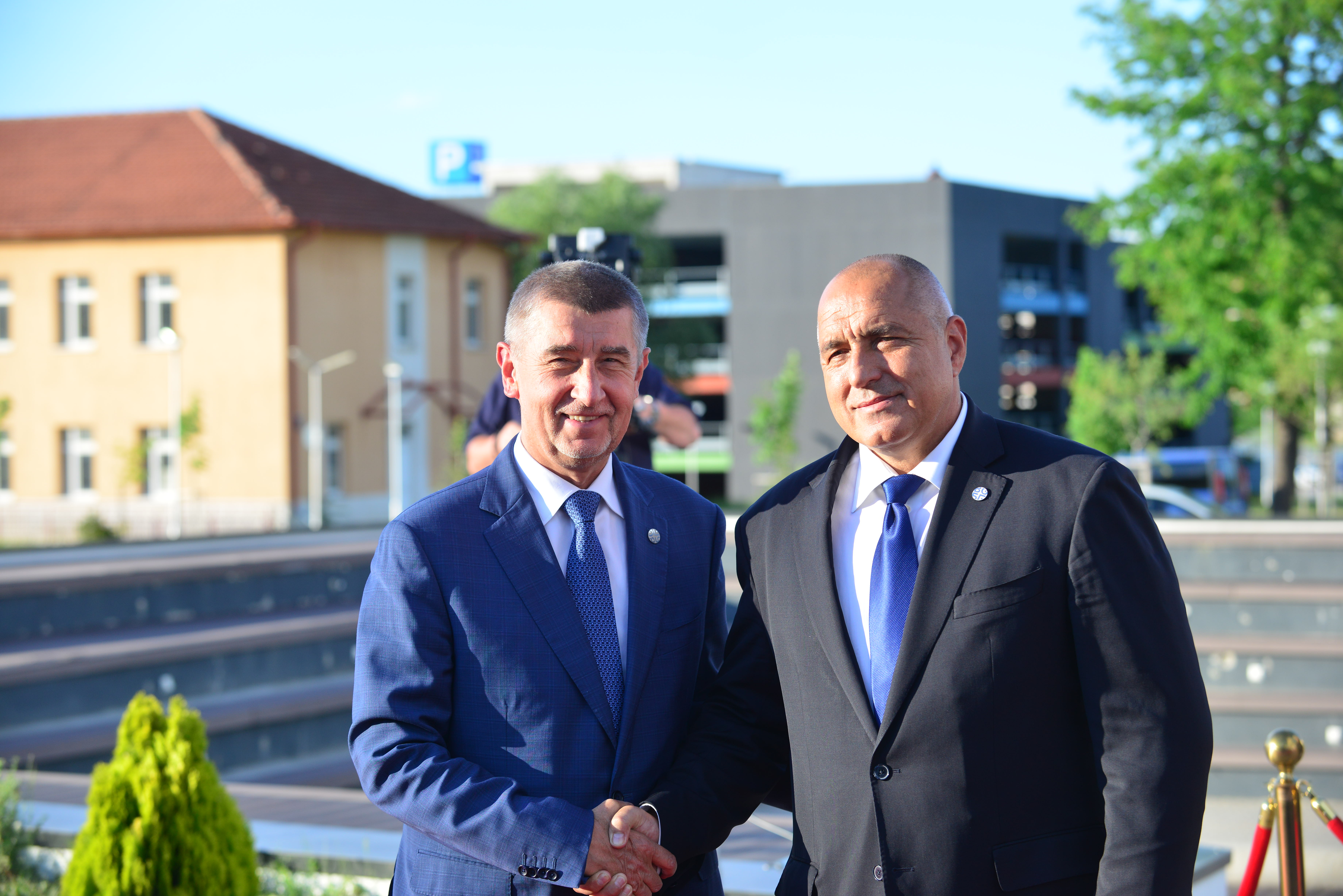
Babiš with Bulgaria's Prime Minister Boyko Borisov, 16 May 2018

Despite losing the confidence vote, Babiš's administration continued to carry out personnel changes, meeting with criticism from the opposition. Minister of Health Adam Vojtěch fired Svatopluk Němeček, a former Minister and head of the University Hospital in Ostrava, as well as the director of the Bulovka Hospital. Minister of Industry and Trade Tomáš Hüner and Minister of Interior Lubomír Metnar fired the heads of CzechInvest and Czech Post, respectively.

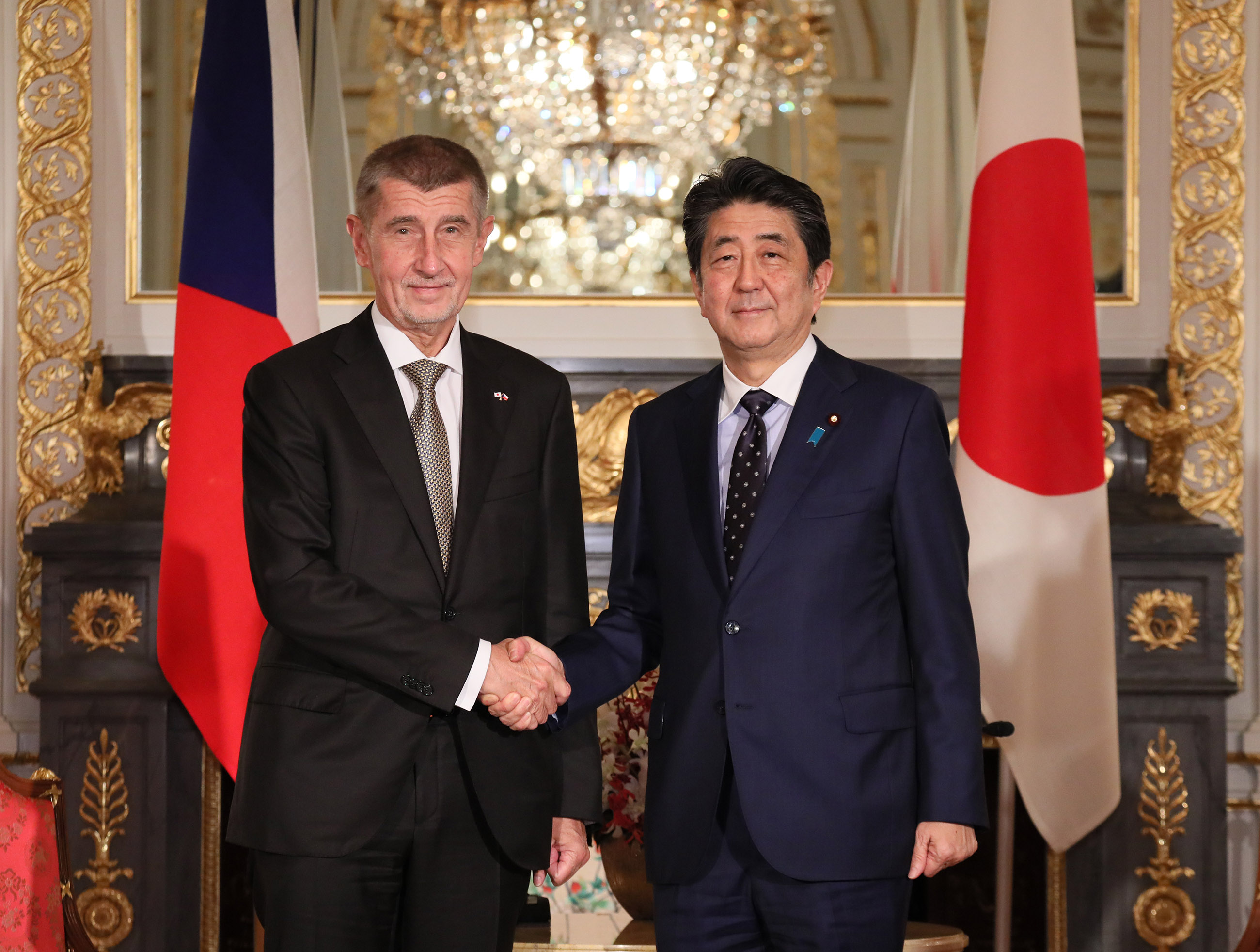
Babiš with Japan's Prime Minister Shinzo Abe, 24 October 2019

On 6 June 2018, President Zeman appointed Andrej Babiš as prime minister for the second time, calling on him to present him with a proposed list of members of the government. Babiš was sworn in by President Zeman for the second time on 27 June 2018, as the head of a minority government formed from ANO and ČSSD representatives. Zeman refused to appoint ČSSD deputy and MEP Miroslav Poche as Minister of Foreign Affairs, so he was replaced by ČSSD party chairman and Interior Minister Jan Hamáček. ČSSD took five seats in the government, and ANO took ten. On 10 July, the two parties signed a coalition agreement. Taťána Malá was appointed Minister of Justice for ANO but resigned 13 days later following allegations of plagiarism in her diploma theses and conflict of interest. Babiš briefly considered consulting with Zeman about the choice for a replacement minister, but in the face of vigorous opposition from opposition parties, he instead nominated Jan Kněžínek, who was sworn in by Zeman on 10 July. On 12 July 2018, shortly after midnight, Babiš's government won a confidence vote in the Chamber of Deputies by a vote of 105–91, with the external support of the Communist Party of Bohemia and Moravia, which lasted until April 2021. This government was the first since the Fall of Communism to rely on confidence and supply from the Communist Party of Bohemia and Moravia.

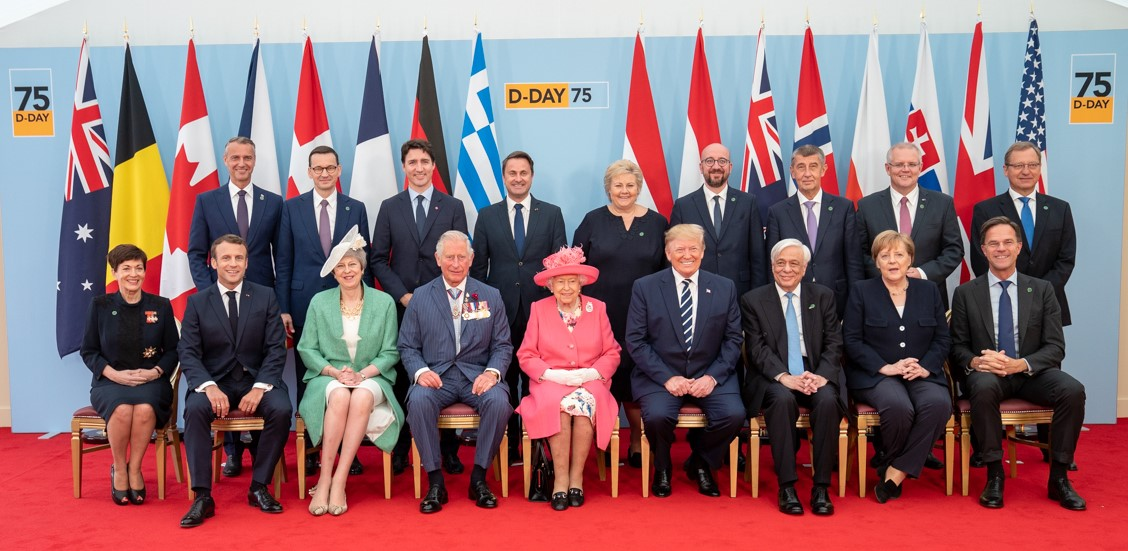
Babiš with Queen Elizabeth II, Angela Merkel, Emmanuel Macron, and other world leaders to mark the 75th anniversary of D-Day in June 2019

Babiš also headed the Government Council for Coordinating the Fight against Corruption, with subsequent approval by the Government. Since the establishment of the council in 2014, this post had always been held by a minister, most recently Minister of Justice Robert Pelikán. After his departure, however, the new coordinator of the fight against corruption was not entrusted, and the management of the council fell to the prime minister. This move was criticized by opposition parties as a conflict of interest. Jan Hamáček stated that it was the Prime Minister's right and he would not act on the issue.

In March 2018, Babiš ordered three Russian diplomats to leave the country in a show of solidarity with the United Kingdom after a former Russian double agent Sergei Skripal was poisoned in Salisbury.

Under Babiš, the Czech government expelled over 80 Russian diplomats and resident spies from its embassy in Prague following the disclosure of Russian involvement in the 2014 Vrbětice explosions, leading to a major diplomatic escalation and strained relations with Russia. The Senate inquiry into the events later found that his government's "uncoordinated response seriously threatened the national security" and "failed to gather support from our allies."

In June 2018, German Chancellor Angela Merkel said that there had been "no moral or political justification" for the post-war expulsion of ethnic Germans from Czechoslovakia. Babiš responded: "I reject this characterisation – especially when we recall the horrors of Heydrich, Lidice, Ležáky and the killing of our paratroopers. I have the feeling that there is some internal political struggle in Germany now, and it is very unfortunate that old wounds are opening because of it."

On 11 November 2018, Babiš represented the Czech Republic in a ceremony at the Arc de Triomphe in Paris to mark the centenary of the Armistice of 11 November 1918 which ended the First World War. The ceremony was attended by world leaders, including US President Donald Trump, German Chancellor Angela Merkel, and Russian President Vladimir Putin.

Babiš's response to COVID-19 pandemic was considered by many to be disorganized and chaotic, with the pandemic resulting in more than 35,000 deaths during his leadership.

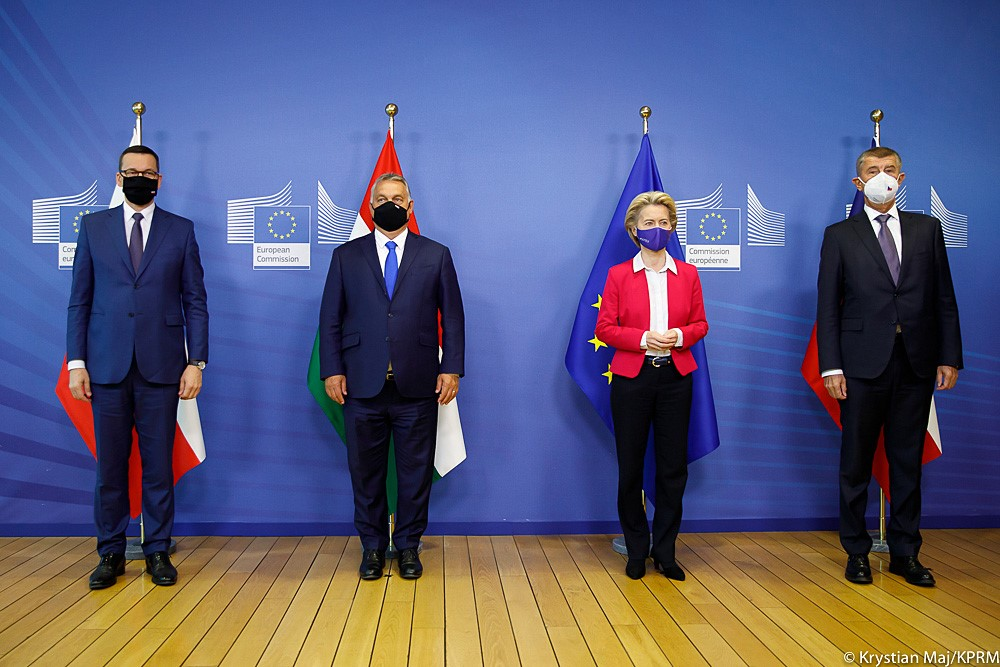
Babiš with President of the European Commission Ursula von der Leyen, Hungarian Prime Minister Viktor Orbán, and Polish Prime Minister Mateusz Morawiecki in Brussels, 24 September 2020

Babiš expressed support for the 2020 Belarusian protests against the Belarusian government and President Alexander Lukashenko, and called for the 2020 Belarusian presidential election to be repeated and for the EU to respond strongly.

Speaking at the COP26 climate summit in Glasgow, Babiš denounced the European Green Deal, saying that the European Union "can achieve nothing without the participation of the largest polluters such as China or the USA that are responsible for 27 and 15 percent, respectively, of global CO2 emissions."

Babiš was unsuccessful in his attempt to remain prime minister after the 2021 election. With no path to a majority in the Chamber of Deputies, he conceded to Petr Fiala, who succeeded him as prime minister on 17 December 2021. Babiš's time in office was marked by a rocky relationship with the European Commission due to his alleged conflict of interest and involvement of his companies in EU subsidies, as well as an informal power alliance with President Miloš Zeman and the Communist Party – both of which triggered heavy criticism from the opposition, activists and the media. His government adopted policies focused on raising the retirement age and reducing pensions, while increasing child tax credits and the salaries of senior politicians. It implemented electronic toll collection on highways and rolled out electronic identification cards for citizens to access e-government services. The Czech government deficit in 2020 was 367.4 billion Czech crowns, the largest in the history of the Czech Republic. At the time Babiš was leaving office, his approval rating among the general public was 30%.

=== Storks Nest affair ===
In November 2018, Seznam Zprávy television aired an interview with Babiš's son Andrej Babiš Jr. (born 1983) in which he alleged that he had been kidnapped by an associate of his father to obstruct the corruption inquiry relating to the Stork's Nest Farm. Babiš Junior was quoted as saying he had been held in Crimea, Kaliningrad, Moscow, and Kryvyi Rih in Ukraine, to stop him from giving a statement to the police about his involvement in the case. Prime Minister Babiš denied the kidnapping, but admitted that his son had entered Crimea, among other places, also adding that his son allegedly had schizophrenia. This has since been denied by Babiš Junior, who stated that his schizophrenia was a false diagnosis and he is no longer taking his pills, though he did not support his statement with medical evidence.

In response to the story, the opposition called on Babiš to resign on 13 November 2018. On 15 November 2018, the Senate adopted a resolution that Babiš was unacceptable in the government while the investigation into the Stork's Nest case was continuing, but the same day, President Zeman stated that if the Chamber of Deputies voted the government down, he would again ask Babiš to form a new cabinet. On 16 November 2018, Babiš stated that he would not resign. On 23 November 2018, Babiš and his government survived a vote of no confidence, as the Communists voted with the government and ČSSD deputies left the chamber.

Several public demonstrations were organised in response to the allegations, especially in larger cities. One of the biggest demonstrations, entitled "Demisi" (Resign), took place on 17 November at the statue of Tomáš Garrigue Masaryk in Hradčanské Square in Prague, organised by the campaign group "A Million Moments for Democracy". The same evening on Wenceslas Square a Concert for the Future was held, protesting against Babiš as well as marking the national occasion of 17 November. An event supporting Babis was held in Klárov, with around 40 participants.

In early September 2019, supervising prosecutor Jaroslav Šaroch proposed that the charges against all defendants in the Stork's Nest affair be dropped. The Prague Public Prosecutor's Office supported the proposal. The prosecutors argued that the Stork's Nest Farm met the definition of an SME at the time of the application, and therefore no offence had been committed. Prague City Prosecutor Martin Erazim said that "Even if, as a result of the Court's subsequent decade of practice, it would be inferred that Stork's Nest Farm did not meet the definition of 'small and medium-sized enterprise' at the time of the 2008 grant application, I do not consider it possible to blame anyone for a possible incorrect assessment of such a legal question at the time of the application for a subsidy 11 years ago." Pavel Zeman, the Prosecutor General, has the authority to change this verdict.

Another anti-government protest was organized by A Million Moments for Democracy on 16 November 2019, one day before the 30th anniversary of the Velvet Revolution. Police estimated some 250,000 people attended the demonstration, a similar turnout to the June 2019 protests.

=== Visit to the United States ===
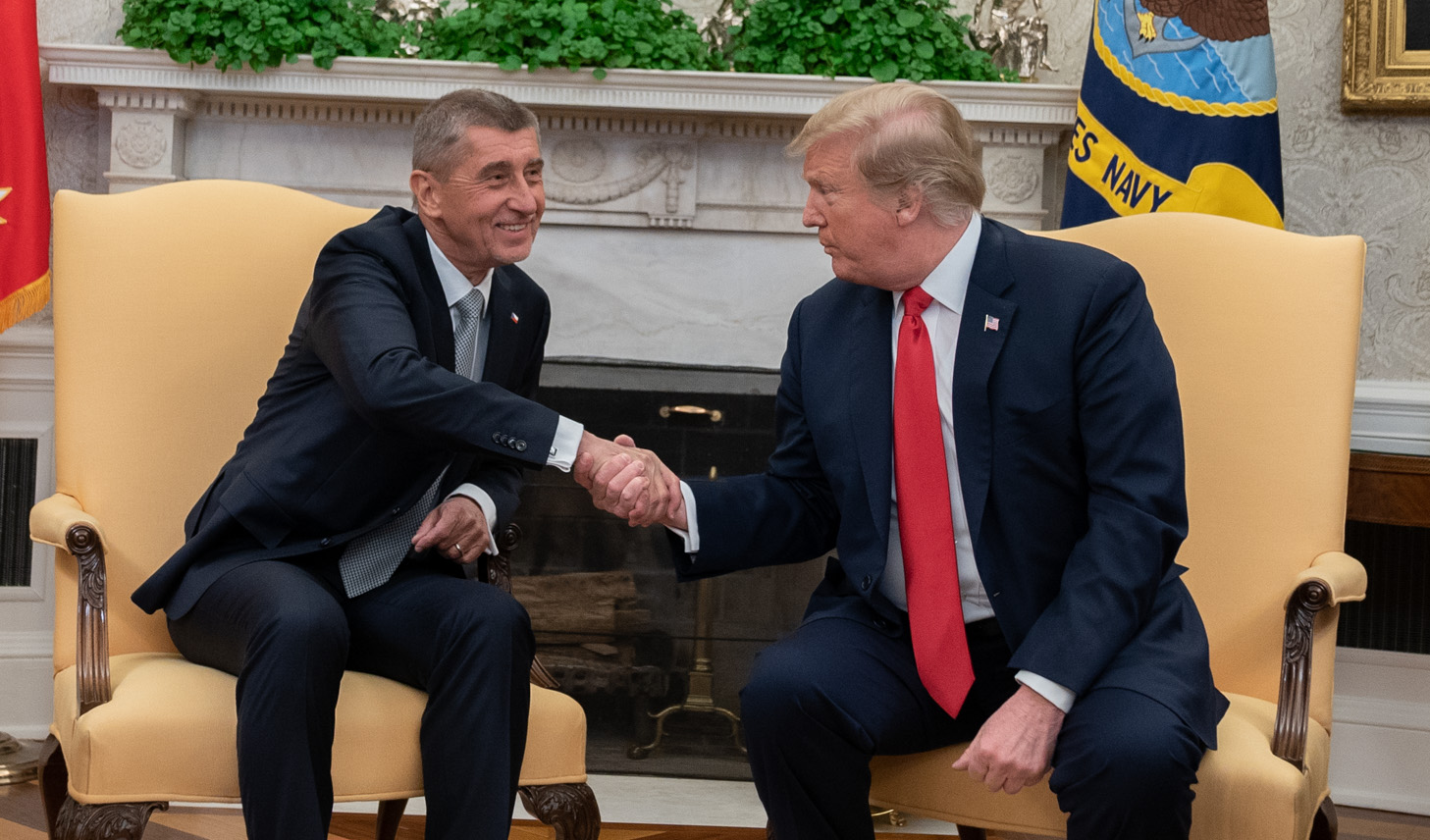
Babiš and U.S. President Donald Trump shake hands in the White House in March 2019

On 17 February 2019, at the fifth ANO party conference, Babis was re-elected chairman unopposed, with 206 votes from the 238 delegates present. Babiš was received by President Trump on 7 March 2019 at the White House in Washington, D.C., on his first official visit to the United States. Before the start of bilateral talks, Babiš stated that the alliance between the United States and the Czech Republic had been going on for 100 years since the establishment of Czechoslovakia. He also mentioned the fact that the wife of President T.G. Masaryk was an American. The two leaders discussed topics such as cyber security, the purchase of helicopters for the Czech Army, the possible construction of nuclear power stations in the Czech Republic, and the import of American liquefied gas into Europe. Babis also appealed to the US president not to impose import duties on automotive products from Europe.

The trip was viewed positively by many Czech politicians. ODS chairman Petr Fiala said that the meeting continued the "tradition of visits" known to the Czech Republic from the past. "It's good that the United States is aware that the Czech Republic is traditionally one of the great supporters of Euro-Atlantic ties in Europe." Pirate Party Deputy chairman Mikuláš Peksa said that the meeting could help prevent trade wars between the US and the European Union. Meanwhile, the communists criticized the unequivocal support for sanctions against Russia.

The American media was critical of Babiš, comparing him to Trump, and giving some details of his domestic issues. Deb Riechmann noted that Babiš, like Trump, was a wealthy businessman, and said that both "rode into office on a nationalist-style campaign." Babis praised Trump's State of the Union Address and even paraphrased his rhetoric ("Make the Czech Republic great again"). In an interview Trump praised the Czech economy, army, people, and good business relations with the US.

=== Anti-government protests ===
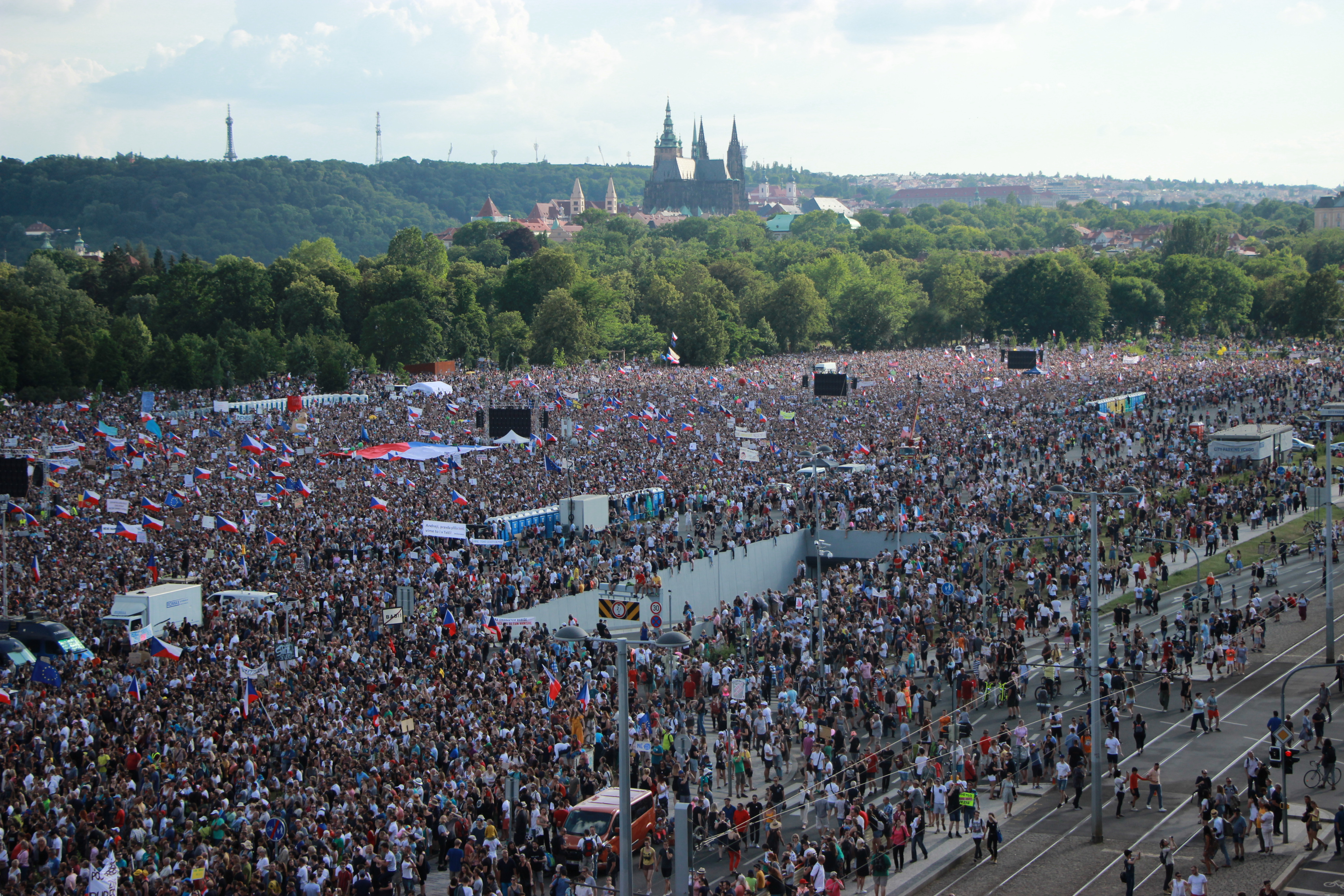
Demonstration against the government of Babiš on 23 June 2019, Letná Park in Prague

At the end of April 2019, Jan Kněžínek, ANO Minister of Justice, resigned. Babiš nominated Marie Benešová, who had also held the post of Minister of Justice in the government of Jiří Rusnok, as his replacement. Concerns about the possible impact of Benešová's appointment on the progress of the Stork's Nest case triggered further public protests, again organized primarily by the Million Moments Association. They intensified in early June, when the preliminary results of two European Union audits were published, finding that Babiš remained in conflict of interest even after the transfer of Agrofert shares into trust funds, and therefore, Agrofert was not entitled to receive European subsidies. According to estimates from the organizers, 120,000 people participated in the demonstration on Wenceslas Square on 4 June 2019.

On 3 June 2019, Babiš met in Prague with the Burmese leader, Aung San Suu Kyi, with whom he spoke about economic cooperation, education and health development. Babiš praised her efforts to democratize Myanmar. On 23 June 2019, A Million Moments for Democracy organized another protest against Prime Minister Babiš, in response to his criminal charges and alleged frauds. According to the EU, he has a conflict of interest. About 250,000 people attended the rally, which was the biggest in the country since the Velvet Revolution in 1989.

== Presidential bid ==
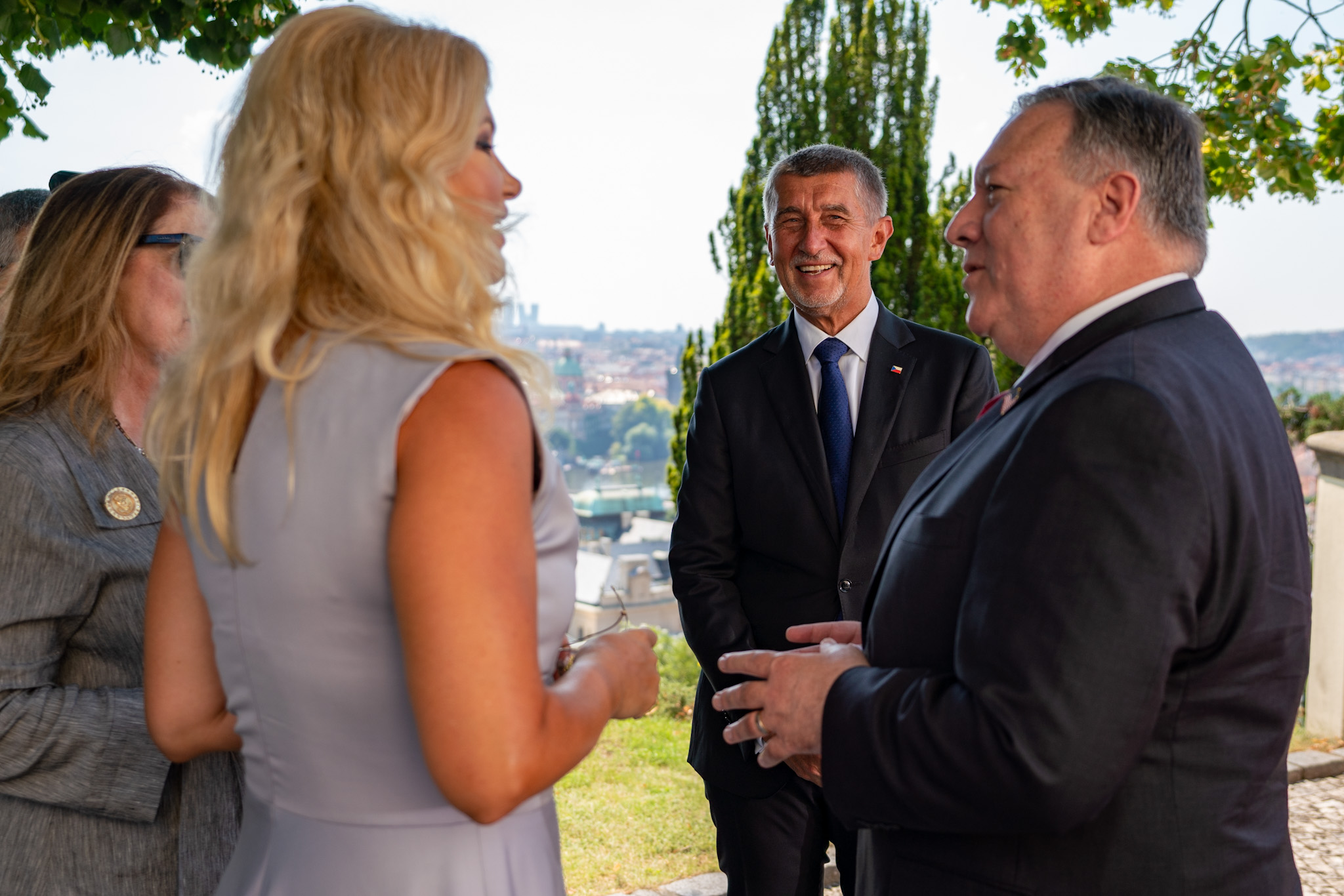
Babiš and his wife with U.S. Secretary of State Mike Pompeo in August 2020

On 30 October 2022, following months of refusing to confirm his candidacy, Babiš announced that he would be running in the 2023 Czech presidential election. In the week before the election (early January 2023), he was considered the frontrunner, alongside the retired army general and former Chair of the NATO Military Committee Petr Pavel. Babiš refused to attend the pre-election public debates, with the exception of TV Nova, stating that "the media want to make a show of the presidential election." His prospects in the election improved significantly at the beginning of January 2023, after he was cleared by the Municipal Court in Prague in an alleged fraud case involving misuse of EU subsidies. He ended up in second place against Pavel in the first and second round in the presidential election.

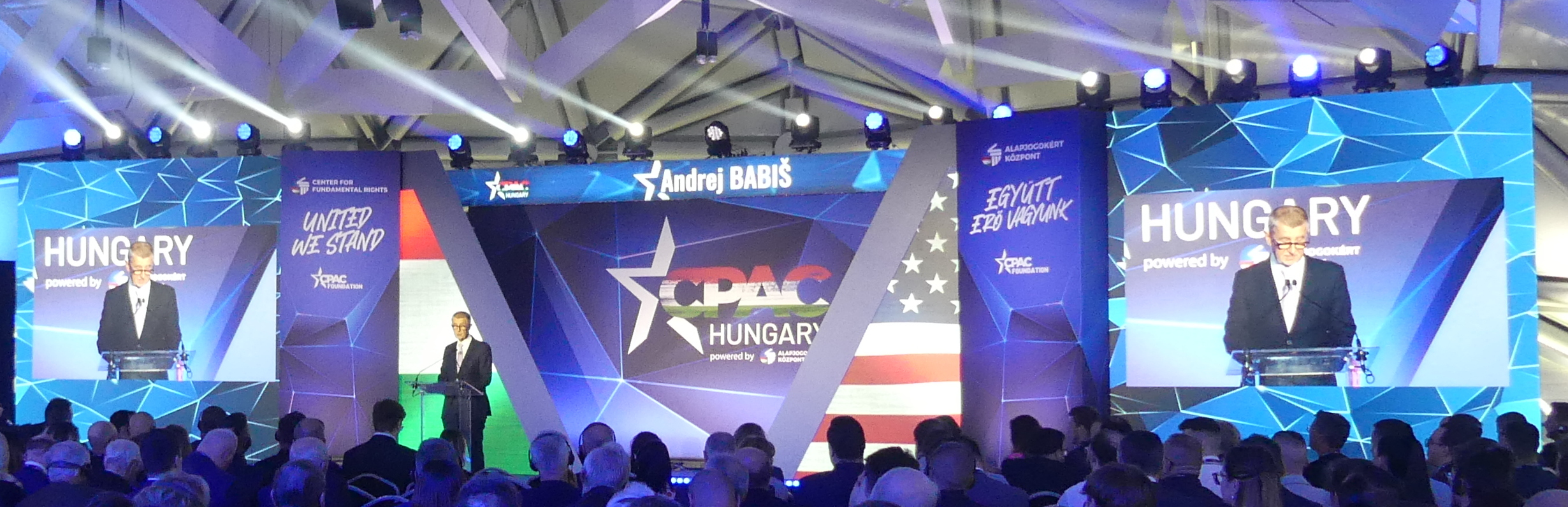
Speaking at CPAC 2023 Budapest

The first round was held on 13 and 14 January 2023. Babiš received 1,952,213 (34.99%) votes, and advanced to the second round against General Petr Pavel. He immediately launched his campaign for the second round, using billboards featuring the slogan "I won't drag Czechia into war. I am a diplomat, not a soldier." This was widely criticised by opposition politicians. In a debate held on 22 January 2023 on Czech Television, Babiš stated that he would refuse to help defend NATO allies (Poland and the Baltic states) in a possible conflict. The claim caused international reactions and was criticised by some politicians and media. He later stated on Twitter that he had been unwilling to answer the hypothetical question during the debate, and that he would uphold article 5 in case of such an attack. On 24 January 2023, Babiš announced he would be cancelling the rest of his contact campaign, due to an anonymous threat.

Babiš lost the second round of the election on 27–28 January with 2,400,271 votes (41.67%). He admitted defeat in a speech at his hustings, expressing hope that Pavel would be "everyone's president" and stated that he would "still be here for the people."

== Inter-premiership (2021–2025) ==
In April 2024, Babiš called the approval of the EU Migration and Asylum Pact by Petr Fiala's cabinet the "greatest betrayal" of the Czech Republic in modern history.

On 1 September 2025, during a rally in Dobrá in Frýdek-Místek District for the upcoming 2025 Czech parliamentary election, Babiš was assaulted and struck in the head by a man with a cane, and subsequently taken to a hospital.

Babiš led ANO into the 2025 Czech parliamentary election, where the party won a plurality of 80 seats in the Chamber of Deputies.

== Second premiership (2025–present) ==
Babiš was inaugurated as prime minister on 9 December 2025 as head of a coalition consisting of ANO 2011, Motorists for Themselves (AUTO) and Freedom and Direct Democracy (SPD). His cabinet was appointed on 14 December.

On 7 January 2026, Babiš confirmed that the ammunition initiative for Ukraine would continue, having previously criticised the scheme as opaque and called for it to be audited or scrapped.

Later in January 2026, Babiš was criticised when—asked about his government's stance on the Greenland crisis—he stated that he had bought a globe costing 15,000 koruna ($720) "to see exactly where this Greenland is".

In 2026, Babiš supported the US attacks on Iran during the 2026 Iran war.

On 21 March 2026, an estimated 250,000 people attended a protest on Prague's Letná Plain against what they described as "the arrogance of power", citing the erosion of democracy, the growing influence of the oligarchy, and government steps they argued were weakening democratic institutions.

== Controversies ==
=== Pandora Papers ===
In October 2021, Babiš was named in the Pandora Papers leak. He did not declare the use of an offshore investment company in the purchase of 16 properties, including two villas, in Mougins on the French Riviera for £18.5 million. The British newspaper The Guardian wrote that in 2009 Babiš, through a "convoluted offshore structure" "to hide ownership of the companies or property" and "secret loans", moved funds from the Czech Republic without taxation to buy real estate in France, including the Château Bigaud in Mougins. Babiš denied any wrongdoing, and alleged that the timing and/or content of the leak was aimed at influencing the upcoming parliamentary election. Jiří Pehe, director of New York University's academic center in Prague, said that Babiš "definitely lost some voters because of this scandal." On 12 May 2026, Seznam Zprávy reported that the French police had concluded their investigation of Babiš's real estate purchases in France.

=== Cooperation with StB ===
According to the documents of the National Memory Institute in Slovakia, Babiš collaborated with the State Security Police (StB) of the Czechoslovak Socialist Republic, under the code name agent Bureš. He denies the accusations, and in 2012 sued the institute for defamation. In January 2018, the Bratislava regional court ruled definitively that Babiš was an StB agent. This final court case may not be appealed.

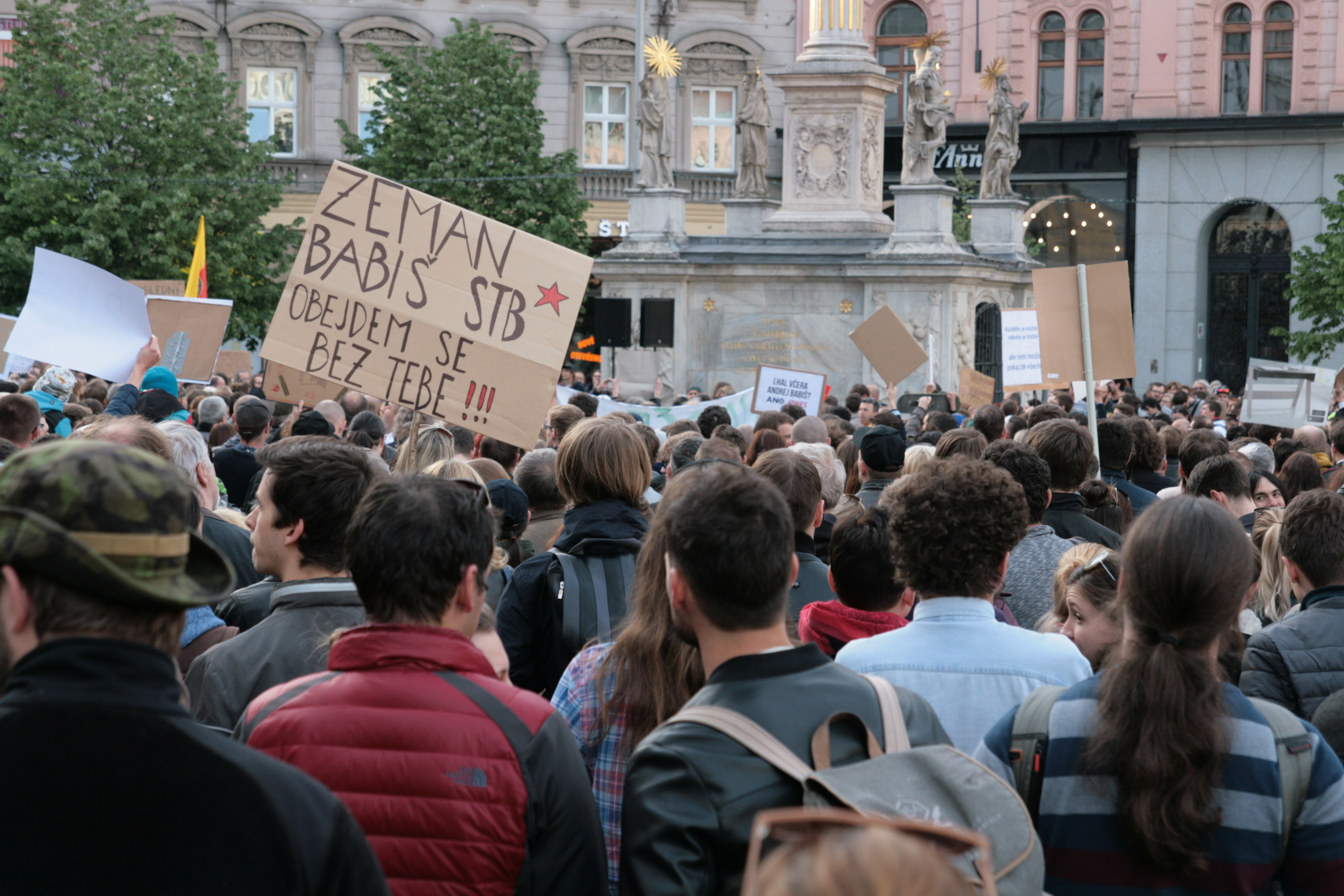
Protest against Babiš in Brno, 10 May 2017

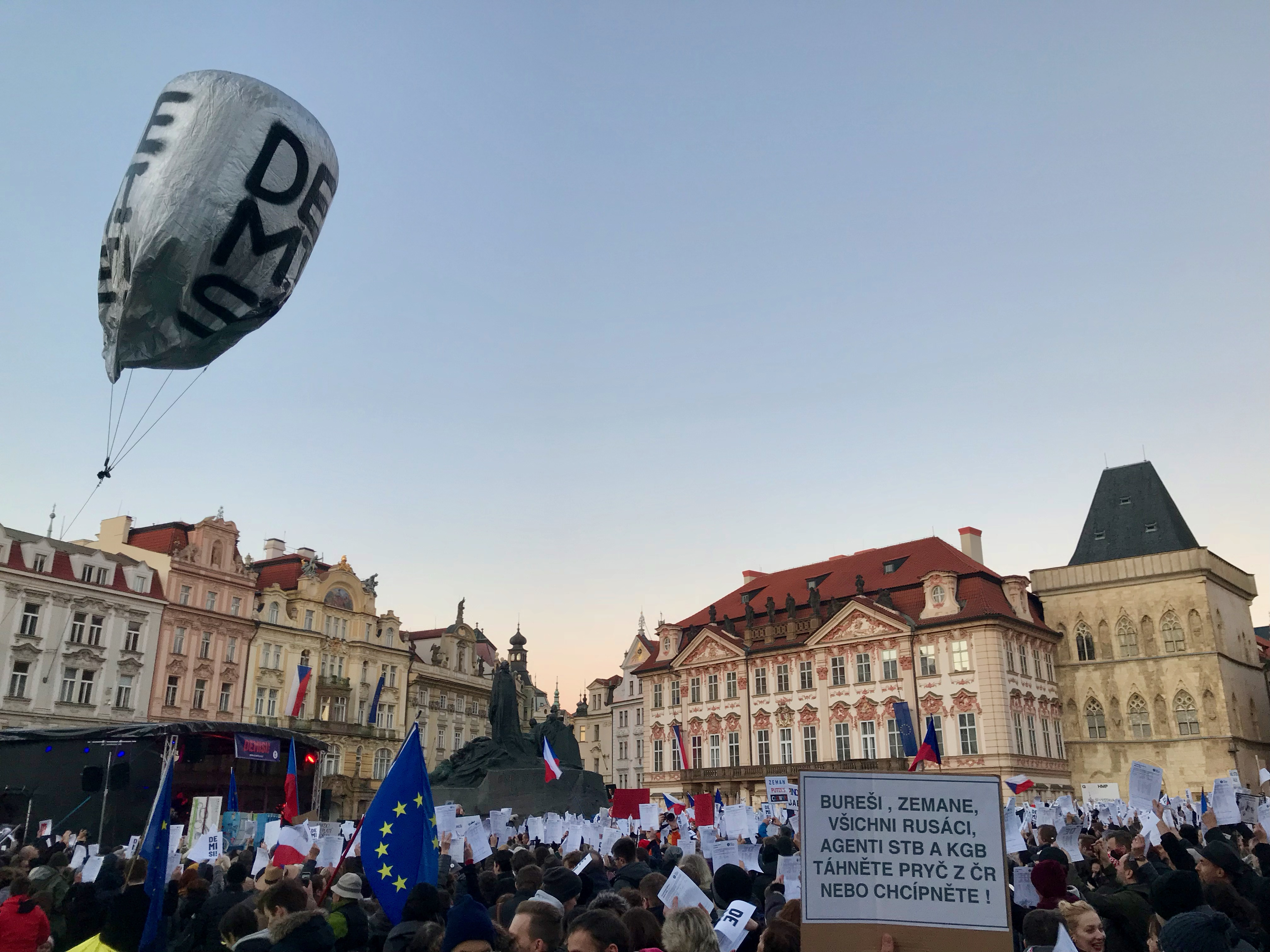
Protest against Babiš in Prague, 17 November 2018

Twelve unrelated cases investigated by StB from 1982 to 1985 were associated with the code name Bureš, according to the Slovak National Memory Institute. Babiš appeared once at the court during the process. The District Court in Bratislava issued a ruling on 26 June 2014 that there was insufficient evidence to put Andrej Babiš on a list of intentional cooperators with StB. The decision was criticised in the Slovak press, and the National Memory Institute announced it would appeal to a higher court. On 30 June 2015, Bratislava's Regional Court upheld the verdict. In October 2017, the Slovak Constitutional Court upheld the National Memorial Institute's appeal, annulling the earlier court decisions and finding that Babiš had been an agent of the former Communist secret police. His final appeal against the decision was dismissed by the constitutional court in February 2024.

Babiš has denied that he was an StB collaborator, but his close associates include Czech lawyer Libor Široký, now chairman of Agrofert's supervisory board, who is reportedly also a former member of one of the StB units most closely linked to the Soviet KGB. Critics who accuse him of KGB connections also point to his alleged support for the 2014 Russian annexation of Crimea, and his opposition to international sanctions against Russia. When a Lebanese arms dealer with alleged Russian connections was released by Czech authorities instead of being extradited to the United States, and it was revealed that every official involved in the release was an ANO party member or was associated with Babiš, he was again accused of having an allegiance to Russia. Opposition MP Miroslav Kalousek (TOP 09) said that it no longer mattered what information the Slovak National Memory Institute had about Babiš, because his behaviour as a politician had proven his StB training.

In March 2015, Babiš condemned Russia's annexation of Crimea. In October 2015, Anne Applebaum, a Pulitzer Prize-winning journalist specialising in Russian and Eastern European affairs, listed Babiš among several Eastern European leaders she considered to be agents of influence for Putin's Russia. Writing in The Washington Post, she suggested that old labels from Soviet Communist days, such as "useful idiots" and "fellow travellers", were no longer adequate to describe Babiš and the other figures she had named. To illustrate her point, she listed several quotes from each leader that sounded very similar to each other and to the arguments broadcast at the same time by official Russian news sources.

Babiš responded to Applebaum with a letter to The Washington Post stating that he had no friends in Russia and was an American ally. US journalist Gabriel Meyr challenged those claims by citing three examples of actions Babiš has taken that have furthered Russian policy goals, such as a Czech government loan guarantee to a Russian company with a record of defaults, owned by a close friend of Russian president Vladimir Putin. The final example was that Babiš had disclosed in 2007 that Agrofert was negotiating to purchase gas from the Czech subsidiary of Gazprom instead of its German supplier.

In February 2016, on the day commemorating the 1948 Czechoslovak coup d'état by the Communist Party of Czechoslovakia, hundreds of protesters opposed to Babiš gathered in Wenceslas Square to protest that Babiš was advancing an agenda that would infringe Czech freedoms, described by leaders of the protest as a quiet revolution, happening in gradual steps.

=== Alleged EU-subsidies fraud ===
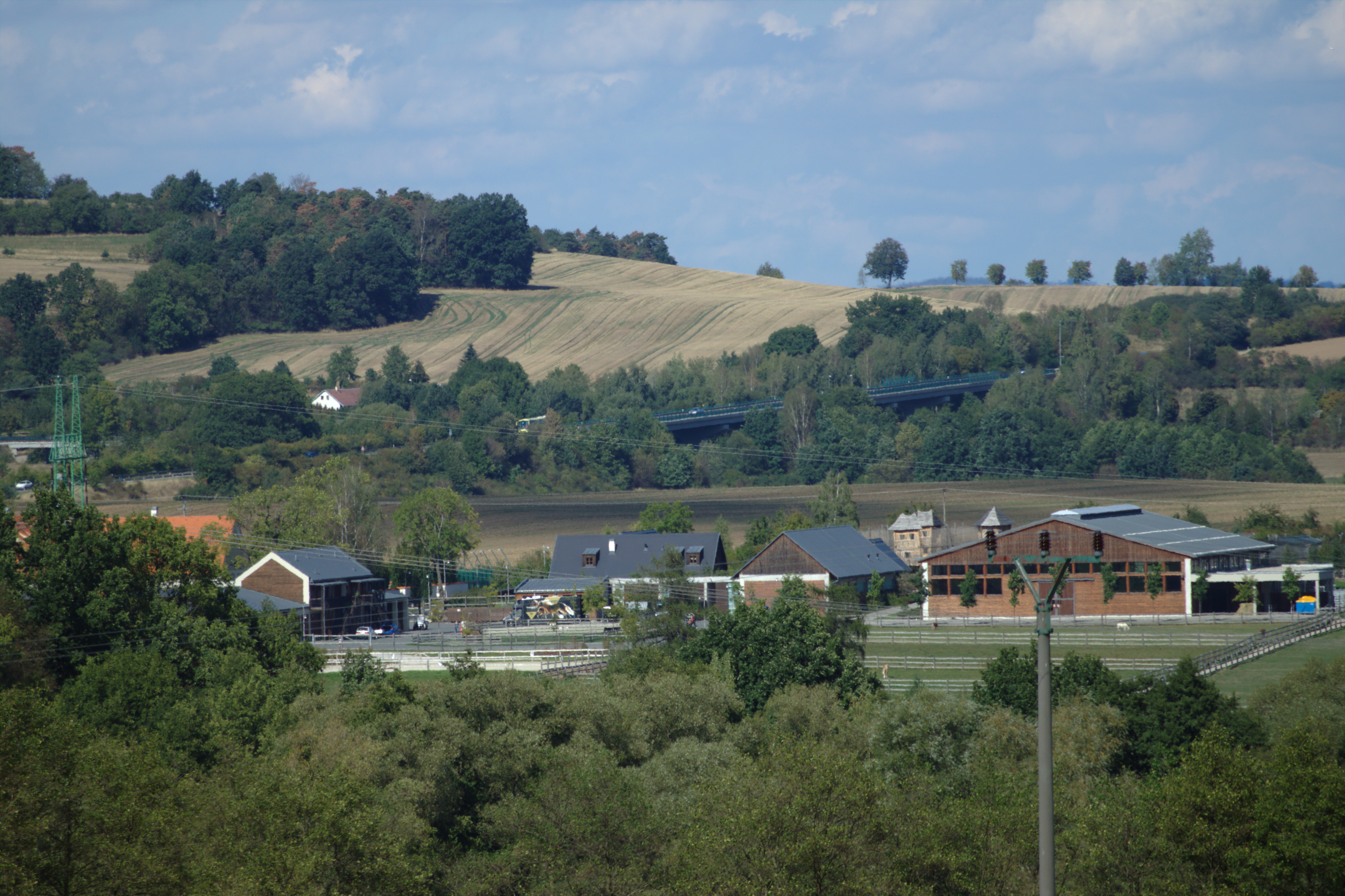
The farm, owned by one of Babiš's companies, which, according to police and OLAF, received an illegal subsidy from the European Union

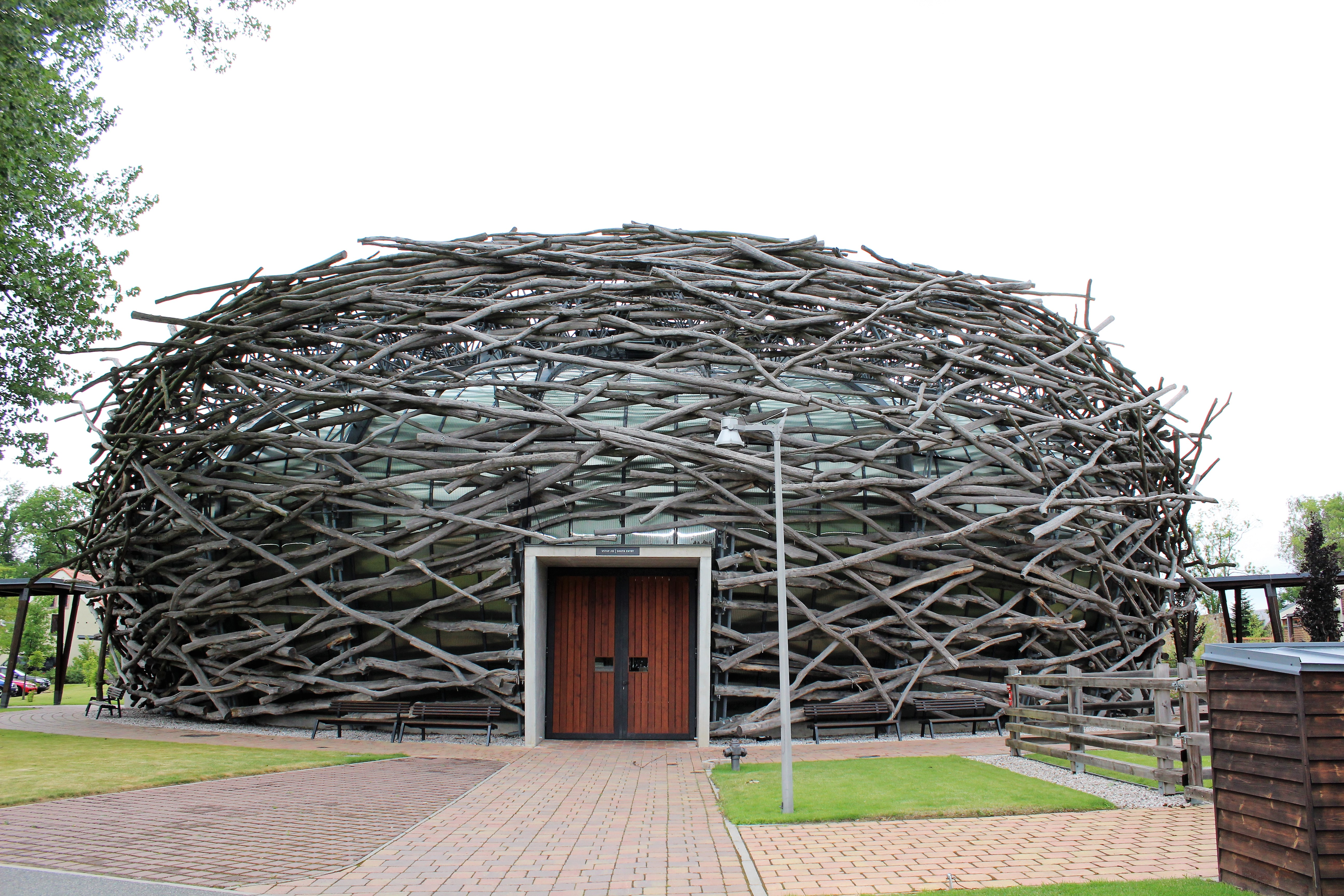
An equestrian facility of the farm resembles a stork's nest.

Babiš was accused of illegally obtaining €2 million in EU subsidies designated for small businesses by concealing his ownership of a farm and a convention center called "Storks Nest" (Czech: Čapí hnízdo). Czech police requested that the Lower House lift his parliamentary immunity on two occasions, in September and November 2017. In both cases, the Lower House lifted the immunity, and the police have initiated criminal proceedings. He is accused of the crime of alleged fraud (§212, Criminal Code, 2009) and of wilful damage to the financial interests of the European Union (§ 260, Criminal Code, 2009) in the criminal conspiracy (§ 89, Art.17, Crime Code (the Czechoslovak Criminal Code, 1961).

This case was investigated by the European Anti-Fraud Office (OLAF). OLAF's final report was delivered to the Czech officers of the Ministry of Finance on 27 December 2017. Journalist Sabina Slonková published a report of the results on the website Neovlivni.cz on 3 January 2018, concluding that OLAF's final report confirmed the results of the investigation by the Czech Police and prosecutors that the fraud was planned from the beginning. The complete text of the final report translated into Czech was published on the website aktualne.cz on 11 January 2018, with a commentary by Vladimír Piskáček, one of the directors of the Economia a.s. media company, which publishes Hospodářské noviny, defending the right to publish information openly. In April 2019, the police recommended indicting Babiš on the charge of fraud. Babiš subsequently replaced the Minister of Justice with an ally, Marie Benešová, leading to a series of protests across the country that continued into May 2019 and culminated in the protest on 23 June 2019, which with about 250,000 people became the largest Czech protest since the Velvet Revolution of November 1989.

On 9 January 2023, Prague's municipal court acquitted Babiš of charges of subsidy fraud. On 12 April 2023 State Attorney Jaroslav Šaroch announced his intention to file an appeal against the first-instance judgment. In September 2023, the high court in Prague overturned the lower court's decision and ordered a retrial, which ended in Babiš's acquittal again on 14 February 2024. On 23 June 2025, the High Court of Prague overturned the acquittal for the second time and ordered another retrial in the Prague Municipal Court. On 15 January 2026, Babiš said that he will not consent to being released for criminal prosecution as some judges make politically motivated decisions.

=== Partnership with Zeman ===
Babiš has been linked closely to President Miloš Zeman since at least 2001, when Zeman was prime minister, and his business interests are alleged to have benefited from the association. In 2001, Zeman oversaw the sale of Unipetrol, a state-owned chemical company, to Babiš. Babiš pulled out of the sale, but later oversaw the sale of the firm to a Polish company. According to Polish reports, the sale was accompanied by substantial bribery, although Babis denied that any bribes were paid. The Unipetrol deal has often been cited as evidence of a close long-term partnership between Babiš and Zeman.

=== Conflicts of interest ===
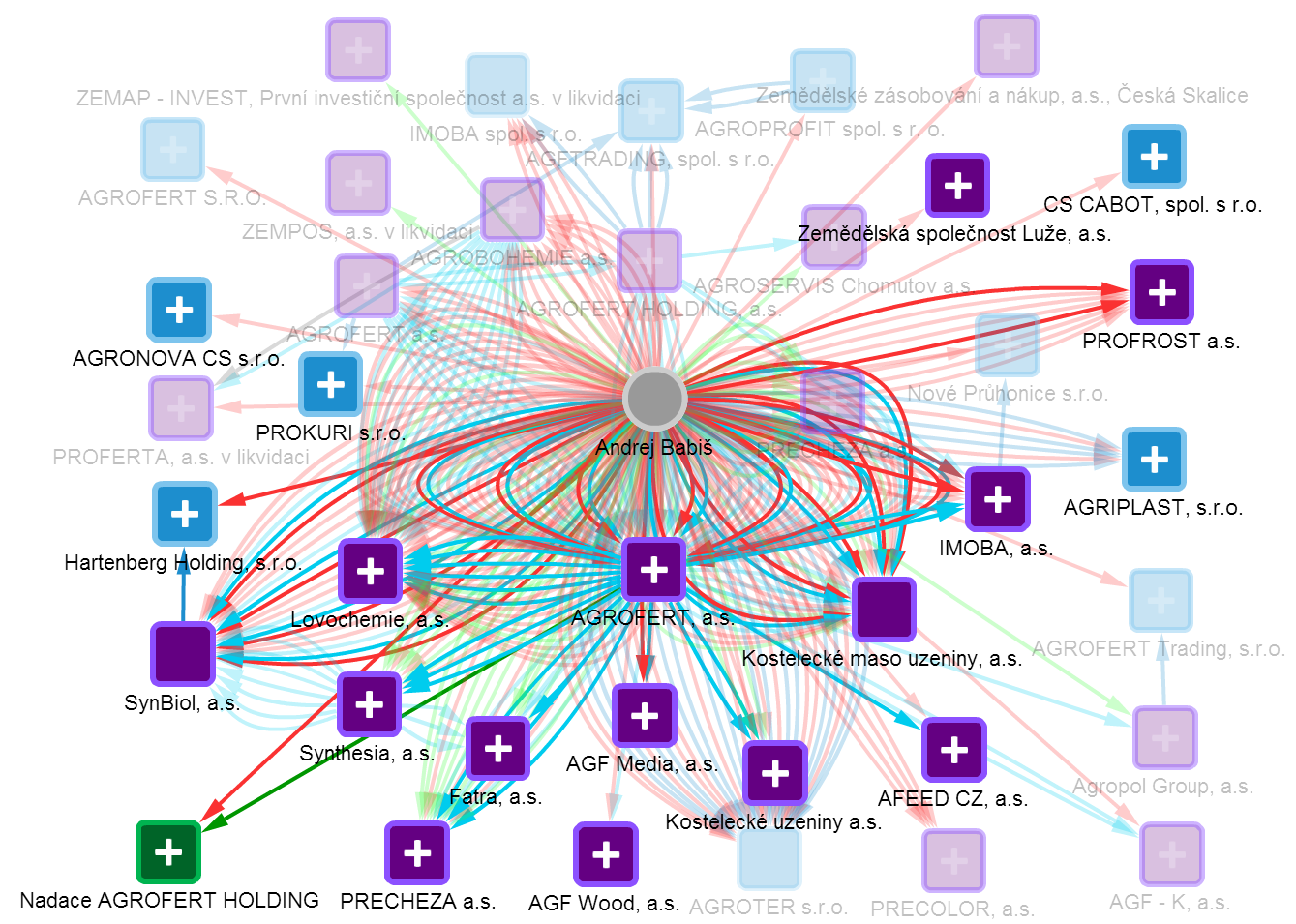
Connections between companies in the AGROFERT portfolio

Babis has been criticized by media and opposition politicians for his alleged conflict of interest, as the Minister of Finance and the owner of companies subsidized by EU funding programmes. During a visit to the Czech Republic in March 2014, the German Member of the European Parliament Ingeborg Gräßle expressed concern that someone with such a personal financial interest simultaneously being a leading representative of a state, could not guarantee to the EU that its resources are properly distributed. A 2014 article in the political newspaper Politico commented that "the Czech Republic is now a paradox: a society disgusted with corruption has given huge power to a man whose business interests amount to the biggest conflict of interest in the country's post-1989 history."

In May 2015, Babiš's alleged financial irregularities and accusations from the public and the opposition that he had promoted his companies in government procurements triggered a vote of no confidence against the Bohuslav Sobotka government, called by the opposition parties ODS, TOP 09, and Dawn. The motion was defeated by 47–105.

A preliminary version of the EU audit reached 22 findings, with a recommendation to take action to repay EU funds totalling 17.49 million euros. The audit concluded that Babiš had a conflict of interest by taking part in decisions about the allocation of EU funds.

=== Intimidation ===
Babiš has a reputation for surrounding himself with senior police officers, security agents, and former Communist informers.

In June 2015, Babiš provoked controversy when a member of parliament, Ladislav Šincl of the Social Democrats (ČSSD), criticised a change in policy from the Finance Ministry on a bill reducing commissions for life insurance mediators in the Chamber of Deputies, and alleged that the benefits to Babiš's business interests may be the cause of the change. On 17 June 2015, Babiš met with Šincl and accused him of corruption and taking bribes from businessman and senator Ivo Valenta, owner of the Synot gambling group. According to witnesses, Babiš brought to the meeting a folder marked with a yellow note labelled Šincl, and started shouting at Šincl that he knew Šincl took bribes from Valenta and was corrupt. He later moved on to his family and Šincl's former jobs.

On 18 June 2015, Babiš admitted he had a folder with Šincl's name, but denied intimidation, saying, "It's not the materials. It's articles from the media. Do the media write lies? I just showed what the media writes, I think they do their job well. When I go to a meeting, I prepare myself so I know who I am dealing with." Babiš's coalition partners ČSSD (Šincl's party) and KDU-ČSL demanded an apology, but Babiš refused, saying that Šincl had lied about him in the Parliament. Prime Minister Bohuslav Sobotka, also the chairman of ČSSD, called a coalition meeting on the same day.

Šincl described Babiš's tactic, of reading potentially damaging facts about him from a file marked with his name, as reminiscent of StB tactics. Miroslav Kalousek, the first deputy chairman of the opposition party TOP09, also accused Babiš of using StB practices, which Babiš denied.

=== MF Dnes leaked tapes ===
On 1 May 2017, Twitter account @skupinasuman posted a tape of Babiš's private conversations with an unknown number of people, in which he labelled Minister of Foreign Affairs Lubomír Zaorálek as an "idiot" and attacked investigative journalist Sabina Slonková, among others. On 3 May 2017, a video on YouTube alleged that Babiš had interfered with the editorial independence of Mladá fronta DNES, the nation's largest quality newspaper by circulation, owned by Babiš's trust. In a conversation with MF Dnes journalist Marek Přibil, he discusses the date of publication of damaging stories about Interior Minister Milan Chovanec and Minister of Health Miloslav Ludvík. On the tape, Babiš is recorded instructing Přibil to tell František Nachtigall, the director of strategic development, when and how to publish the stories.

=== Comments about Lety concentration camp ===
On 1 September 2016, while visiting Varnsdorf, a city with a large Romani population, Babiš said: "What those idiots [journalists] write in newspapers, that the camp in Lety was a concentration camp, that is a lie, it was a labor camp, people who didn't work ended up there." Babiš's comments were heavily criticized by both coalition partners and opposition MPs, who called on him to resign. Prime Minister Bohuslav Sobotka condemned the remarks on Facebook and advised Babiš to visit the camp.

Minister for Human Rights and Equal Opportunities Jiří Dienstbier called for Babiš to step down as Finance Minister and First Deputy Prime Minister. The leaders of both opposition parties, Petr Fiala from ODS and Miroslav Kalousek from TOP 09 also called for Babiš to step down.

=== 2023 Conservative Political Action Conference ===
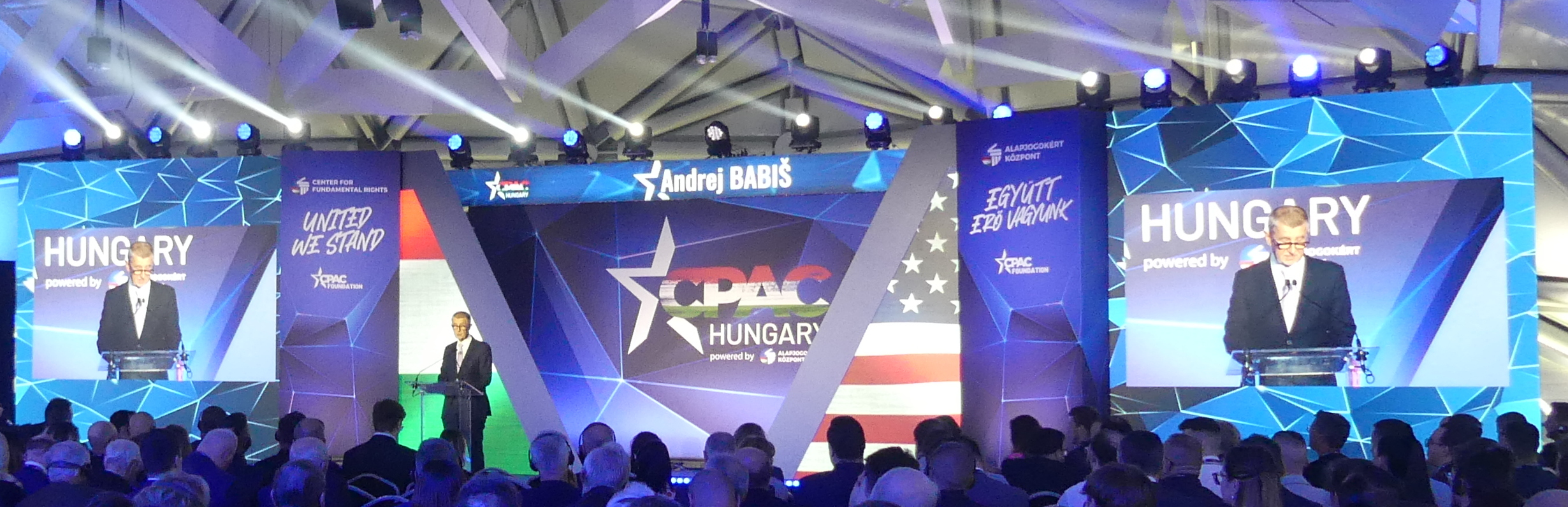
Babiš speaking at the 2023 Conservative Political Action Conference (CPAC)

In May 2023, Babiš attended the 2023 Conservative Political Action Conference (CPAC) in Hungary and was labelled as a "conservative leader." His decision to attend the conservative conference was criticized by Renew Europe and the Alliance of Liberals and Democrats for Europe Party, in which ANO participated.

== Media criticism ==
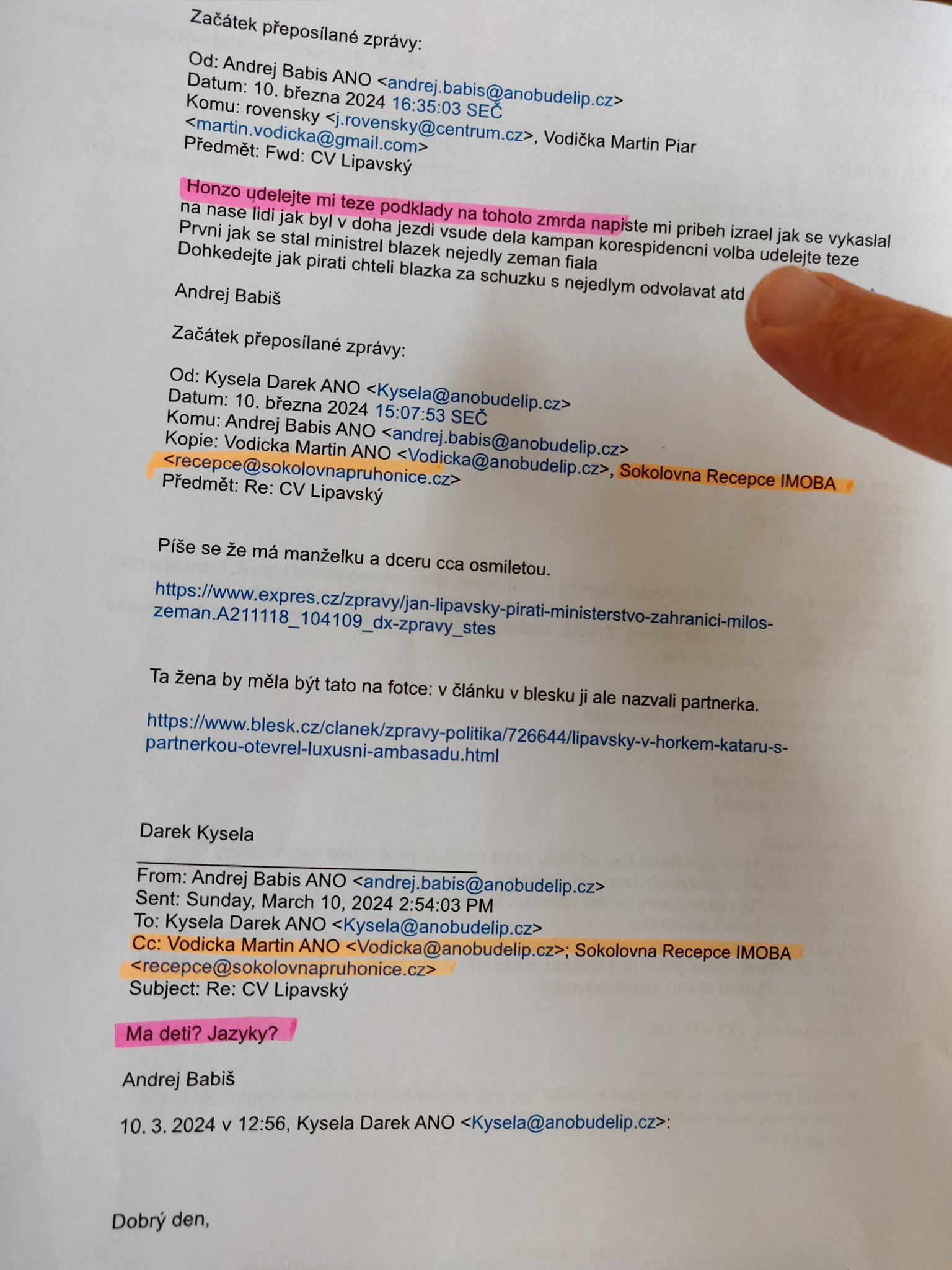
Andrej Babiš requested sensitive information about Foreign Minister Jan Lipavský from his associates over the weekend (10 March 2024).

Foreign Policy magazine gave Babiš the nickname Babisconi, a portmanteau of his surname and the surname of former Italian Prime Minister Silvio Berlusconi, the subject of numerous political and financial scandals. In response, Babiš threatened to sue the magazine, but has never done so.

In August 2015, the Swiss weekly L'Hebdo published an article entitled: "Why do Czech Oligarchs Buy Unprofitable Media Outlets?" examining the purchase of media companies by several Czech business people, and also their connections with Francophone Switzerland. The article focused much of its attention on Babiš, and his purchase of media outlets in the Czech Republic. The author pointed out that Babiš had claimed to invest in Mladá fronta DNES only for profit, but had given no answer when told it was an unprofitable investment, and went on to accuse journalists at Babiš's newspapers of doing his work.

Writing in Politico, Adam Drda expressed the view that Babiš is more associated with the decline of Czech democracy than any other individual.

Andrej Babiš was a winner of the Green Pearl prize for the anti-ecological comment of the year 2013: "We will probably screw ourselves up with that democracy one day, all of us. How else to explain the fact that a badger, an ecological terrorist, and also every mayor (to his town) wants to have an exit to the highway."

== Personal life ==
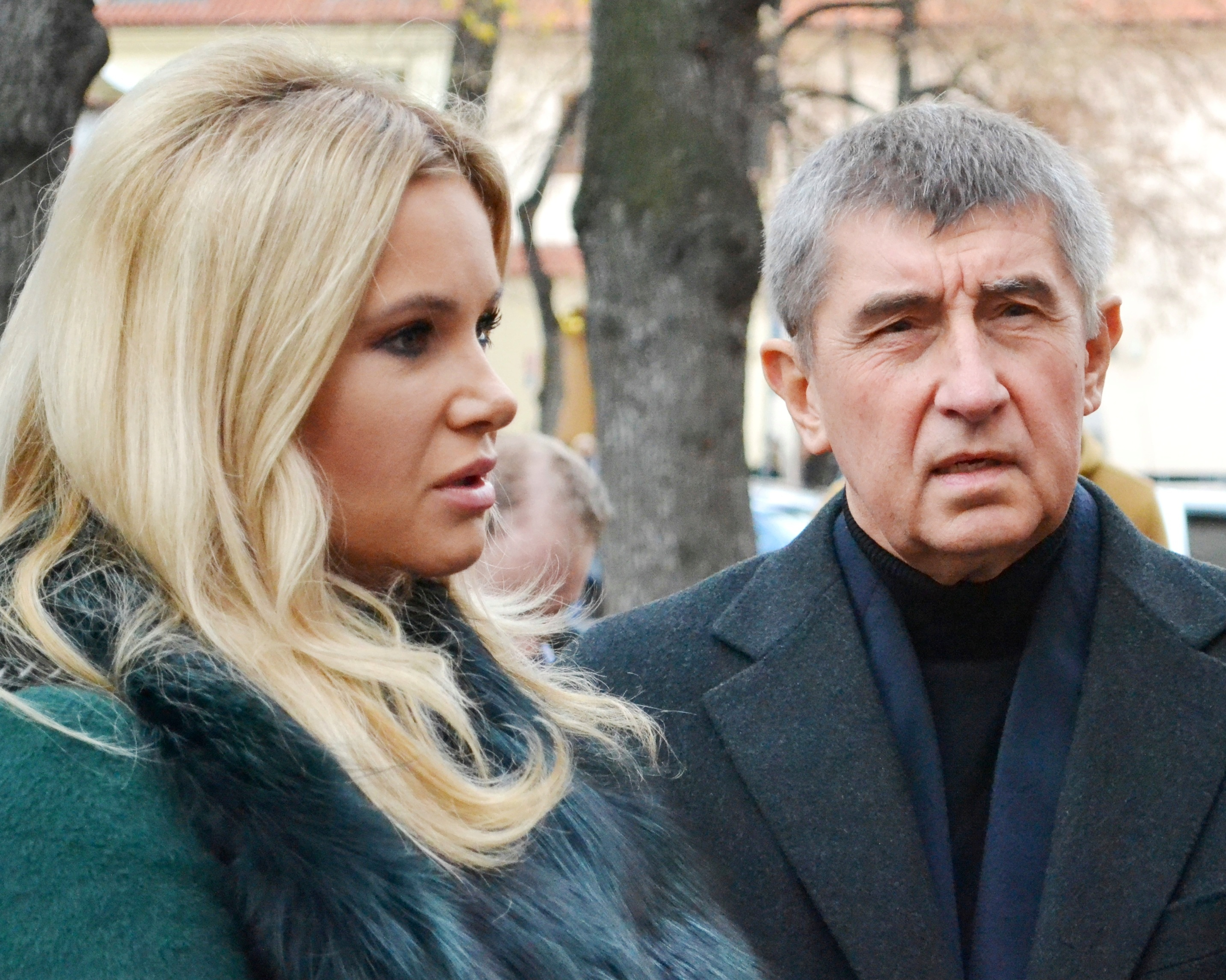
Babiš with his then-partner (now ex-wife) Monika in 2015

Babiš lives in Průhonice, where he had a luxury villa built in 2004, and owns several other properties there as well.

Babiš's first wife was physician Beata (later Beatrice) Adamičová, a schoolmate, whom he married in the 1970s. They had two children, Adriana (born 1979) and Andrej (born 1982), both of whom were involved in the Stork's Nest case. Since 2007 Adriana has been married to Agrofert manager Martin Bobek.

Since the 1990s Babiš has lived with his former secretary Monika Herodesová (born 1974), with whom he has two children, Vivien and Frederik. Both Monika and her brother Martin Herodes were also involved in the Stork's Nest case.

In 2013, Monika changed her surname to Babišová, and they married in 2017. The couple split in April 2024. Babiš holds dual citizenship of the Czech Republic and Slovakia. He gained Czech citizenship in 2000 by declaration, while maintaining his Slovak citizenship by descent as both of his parents are Slovak citizens. Babiš repeatedly declared himself to be a Czech national. During the campaign for the 2023 presidential election, he stated: "I'm not a Slovak, I'm a Czech."

In 2019, Babiš described himself as irreligious but spiritual, referring to the cosmos as a source of inspiration. During the campaign for the 2023 Czech presidential election, he declared himself as an occasional church-goer with a devotion to the Infant Jesus of Prague. These claims were disputed by commentators and the media as a part of mobilisation campaign aimed at the religious electorate.

== Notes ==
Party political offices
Position established	Leader of ANO; 2012–present	Incumbent
Political offices
Preceded by Jan Fischer	Minister of Finance; 2014–2017	Succeeded by Ivan Pilný
Preceded by Jan Fischer	First Deputy Prime Minister of the Czech Republic; 2014–2017	Succeeded by Richard Brabec
Preceded by Bohuslav Sobotka	Prime Minister of the Czech Republic; 2017–2021	Succeeded by Petr Fiala
Preceded by Petr Fiala	Prime Minister of the Czech Republic; 2025–present	Incumbent
