= Second cabinet of Andrej Babiš =

Governing body of the Czech Republic

Second Cabinet of Andrej Babiš
- 15th Cabinet of Czech Republic

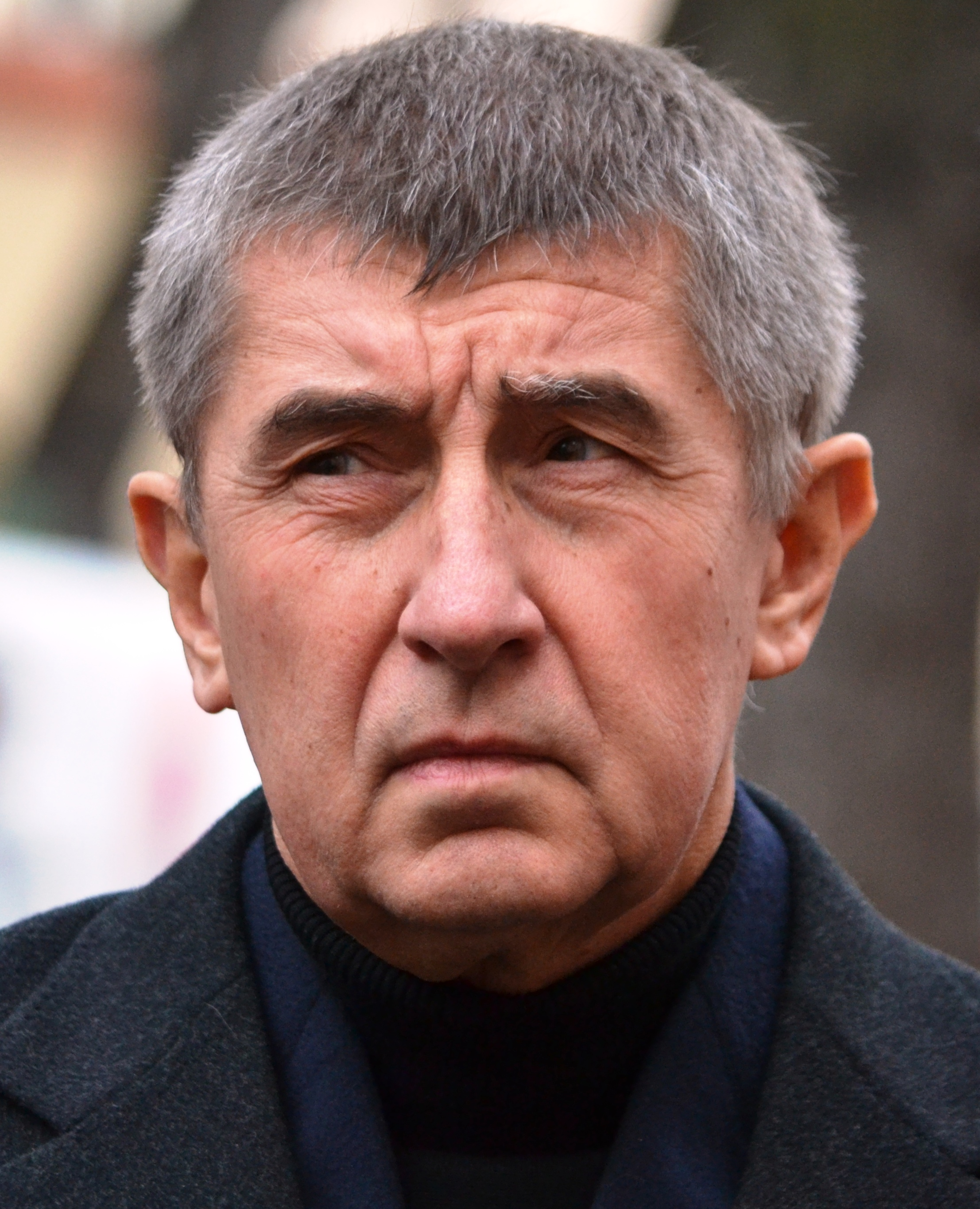
- Andrej Babiš, Prime Minister
- Date formed: 27 June 2018
- Date dissolved: 17 December 2021

People and organisations
- Head of state: Miloš Zeman
- Head of government: Andrej Babiš
- Deputy head of government: Jan Hamáček; Richard Brabec (2017–2019)
- No. of ministers: 15
- Ministers removed: 2
- Total no. of members: 17
- Member parties: ANO (10 ministers); ČSSD (5 ministers)
- Status in legislature: Minority government (Coalition)
- Opposition parties: Opposition: ODS (23); Piráti (22); SPD (20); KSČM (15; since 13 April 2021); KDU-ČSL (10); TOP 09 (7); STAN (6); Unified - Alternative for Patriots (3); Tricolour Citizens' Movement (3)
- Opposition leader: Petr Fiala

History
- Election: 2017 Czech parliamentary election
- Predecessor: Babiš I
- Successor: Fiala

The second cabinet of Andrej Babiš was a centre-left to centre-right minority coalition government in the Czech Republic, consisting of ANO 2011, a populist political movement, and the centre-left Czech Social Democratic Party (ČSSD). The coalition received external support from the Communist Party of Bohemia and Moravia (KSČM). The head of government was Andrej Babiš, leader of ANO.

The cabinet was approved by the Chamber of Deputies on 12 July 2018 with a 105–91 vote. The Communist Party withdrew its support for the government on 13 April 2021. The government left office on 17 December 2021, and was replaced by the cabinet of Petr Fiala.

== Background ==
The general election in 2017 was won by ANO, led by Andrej Babiš, who received 78 seats out of 200, becoming the largest party. President Miloš Zeman appointed Babiš to form a government, but all other parliamentary parties had ruled out entering a coalition with ANO due to an ongoing police investigation into Babiš's alleged subsidy fraud. In early 2018, Babiš lost a confidence vote to form an ANO minority government, with all other parties voting against. In 2018, ČSSD decided to enter coalition talks with ANO. In April, the negotiations broke down. President Miloš Zeman subsequently gave Babiš a second chance to form a government. In May, ČSSD accepted talks with ANO, with KSČM also participating to determine the conditions for its support of an ANO-ČSSD government.

== Government formation ==
The cabinet consisted of two coalition parties. ANO, the senior coalition partner in the government, had 10 ministers (including Prime Minister). The Social Democrats had four ministers and held five ministries, as President Zeman refused to appoint Miroslav Poche, the party's nominee for Foreign Minister, and Jan Hamáček was appointed as acting Foreign Minister.

The coalition held 93 seats in the Chamber of Deputies, eight seats short of a simple majority of 101, and therefore required the support of another party to provide confidence and supply. KSČM agreed to support the minority government in exchange for cabinet support for several of their demands. With KSČM support, the government controlled a majority of 108 seats. On 15 June 2018, following approval in a referendum of party members, ČSSD formed a coalition with ANO.

The cabinet was approved by the Chamber of Deputies in the early morning of 12 July 2018 with a 105-91 vote, during a parliamentary session which had begun the previous morning. During the debate, deputies from TOP 09 left the Chamber in protest (they later returned to vote against the government), while some deputies from the Christian and Democratic Union – Czechoslovak People's Party unfurled a Soviet flag to protest against the government being supported by the Communist Party. Street protests also took place in Prague against the role of the Communists in the government.

== Resignations over plagiarism ==
Shortly after the formation of the cabinet, two ministers (Taťána Malá of ANO and Petr Krčál of ČSSD) resigned after being accused of plagiarism in their bachelor theses.

On 24 July 2018, another minister, Lubomír Metnar (Independent for ANO) also came under suspicion of plagiarism in his diploma thesis.

== Cabinet members ==
Portfolio	Minister	Party	Office	
Portfolio	Minister	Party	Took	Left
Prime Minister	Andrej Babiš	ANO	6 June 2018	17 December 2021
First Deputy Prime Minister; Minister of Interior	Jan Hamáček	ČSSD	27 June 2018	17 December 2021
Deputy Prime Minister	Richard Brabec	ANO	27 June 2018 (Note: since 29 January 2014 as Minister of the Environment within Bohuslav Sobotka's Cabinet and Andrej Babiš' First Cabinet, since 24 May 2017 as Deputy PM within Bohuslav Sobotka's Cabinet and Andrej Babiš' First Cabinet)	30 April 2019
Deputy Prime Minister	Alena Schillerová	Ind. for ANO	30 April 2019	17 December 2021
Deputy Prime Minister	Karel Havlíček	Ind. for ANO	30 April 2019	17 December 2021
Minister of Foreign Affairs	Jan Hamáček (acting)	ČSSD	27 June 2018	15 October 2018
Minister of Foreign Affairs	Tomáš Petříček	ČSSD	16 October 2018	12 April 2021
Minister of Foreign Affairs	Jan Hamáček (acting)	ČSSD	12 April 2021	21 April 2021
Minister of Foreign Affairs	Jakub Kulhánek	ČSSD	21 April 2021	17 December 2021
Minister of Finance	Alena Schillerová	Ind. for ANO	27 June 2018 (Note: since 13 December 2017 within Andrej Babiš' First Cabinet)	17 December 2021
Minister of Health	Adam Vojtěch	Ind. for ANO	27 June 2018	21 September 2020
Minister of Health	Roman Prymula	Ind. for ANO	21 September 2020	29 October 2020
Minister of Health	Jan Blatný	Ind. for ANO	29 October 2020	7 April 2021
Minister of Health	Petr Arenberger	Ind. for ANO	7 April 2021	26 May 2021
Minister of Health	Adam Vojtěch	Ind. for ANO	26 May 2021	17 December 2021
Minister of the Environment	Richard Brabec	ANO	27 June 2018	17 December 2021
Minister of Labour and Social Affairs	Petr Krčál	ČSSD	27 June 2018	18 July 2018
Minister of Labour and Social Affairs	Jana Maláčová	ČSSD	30 July 2018	17 December 2021
Minister of Industry and Trade	Marta Nováková	ANO	27 June 2018	30 April 2019
Minister of Industry and Trade	Karel Havlíček	Ind. for ANO	30 April 2019	17 December 2021
Minister of Justice	Taťána Malá	ANO	27 June 2018	10 July 2018
Minister of Justice	Jan Kněžínek	Ind. for ANO	10 July 2018	30 April 2019
Minister of Justice	Marie Benešová	Ind. for ANO	30 April 2019	17 December 2021
Minister of Education, Youth and Sport	Robert Plaga	ANO	27 June 2018	17 December 2021
Minister of Defence	Lubomír Metnar	Ind. for ANO	27 June 2018	17 December 2021
Minister of Transport	Dan Ťok	Ind. for ANO	27 June 2018 (Note: since 4 December 2014 within Bohuslav Sobotka's Cabinet and Andrej Babiš' First Cabinet)	30 April 2019
Minister of Transport	Vladimír Kremlík	Ind. for ANO	30 April 2019	20 January 2020
Minister of Transport	Karel Havlíček	Ind. for ANO	20 January 2020	17 December 2021
Minister for Regional Development	Klára Dostálová	Ind. for ANO	27 June 2018	17 December 2021
Minister of Agriculture	Miroslav Toman	Ind. for ČSSD	27 June 2018	17 December 2021
Minister of Culture	Antonín Staněk	ČSSD	27 June 2018	31 July 2019
Minister of Culture	Lubomír Zaorálek	ČSSD	27 August 2019	17 December 2021

== Popular mandate ==
Support for governing parties according to the popular vote.

Member party	Popular vote	Percentage	MPs	Ministers	Leader
ANO	1,500,113	29.64%	78	10	Andrej Babiš
ČSSD	368,347	7.27%	15	5	Jan Hamáček
Government	1,868,460	36.91%	93	15	Andrej Babiš
KSČM	393,100	7.76%	15	0	Vojtěch Filip
Govt. & support	2,261,560	44.67%	108	15	Andrej Babiš
Czech Republic	5,091,065	100%	200	–	

== Confidence motion ==
Motion of confidence Andrej Babiš (ANO)
Ballot →	11 July 2018
Required majority →	99 out of 196 (simple)
Yes: • ANO (77); • ČSSD (14); • KSČM (14)	105 / 200
No: • ODS (25); • Pirates (22); • SPD (22); • KDU-ČSL (10); • TOP 09 (7); • STAN (5)	91 / 200
Abstentions	0 / 200
Absentees: • ANO (1); • KSČM (1); • ČSSD (1); • STAN (1)	4 / 200
