= Ministry of Health (Czech Republic) =

Government ministry of the Czech Republic

Ministry of Health Czech Republic
- Ministerstvo zdravotnictví České republiky

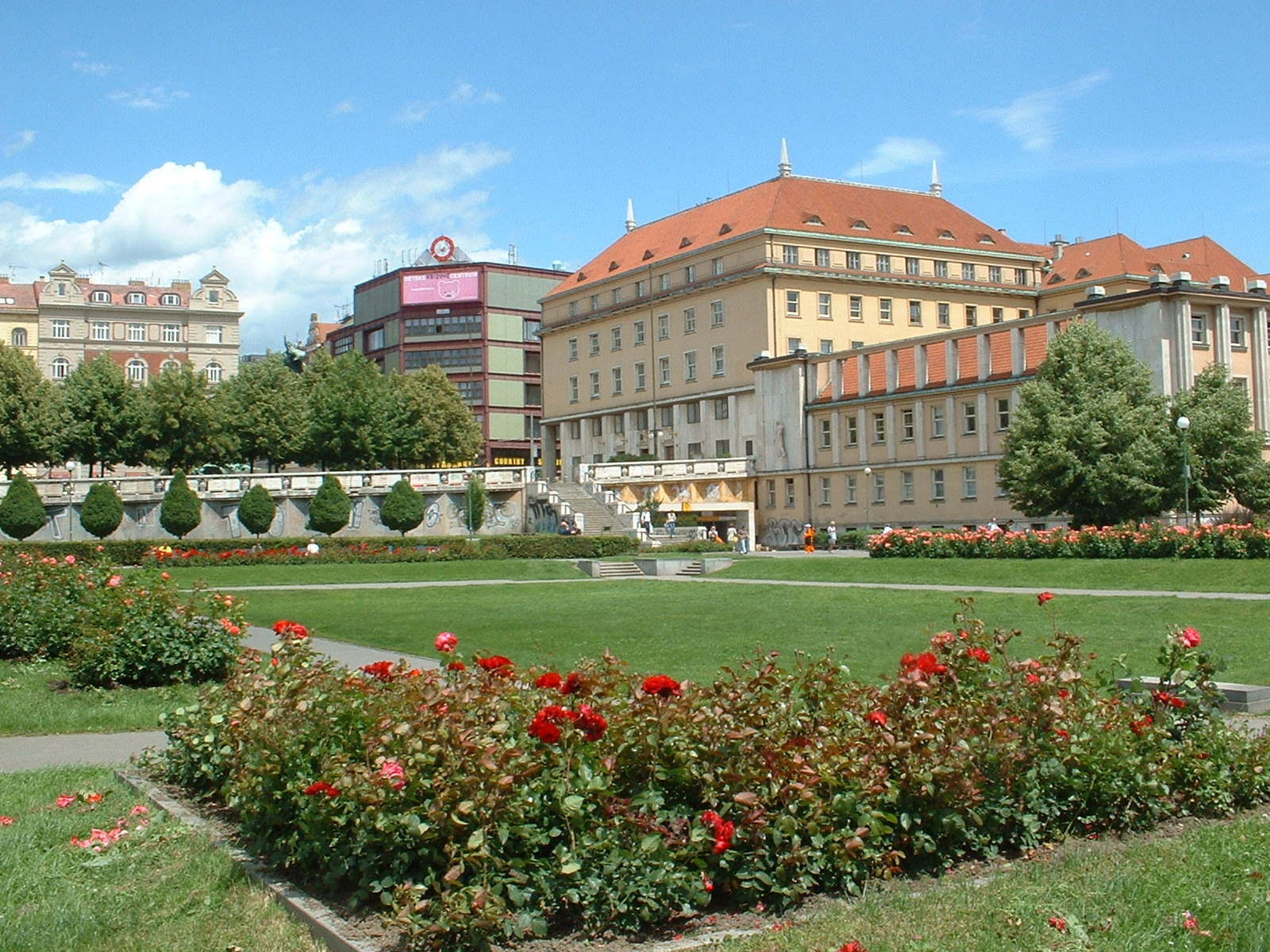

Agency overview
- Headquarters: Palackého nám. 4, 128 01 Prague 2 (Nové Město); 50°4′22.94″N 14°24′55.31″E
- Agency executive: Adam Vojtěch, Minister of Health
- Website: mzd.gov.cz

The Ministry of Health of the Czech Republic (Czech: Ministerstvo zdravotnictví České republiky) is a government ministry of the Czech Republic.

It is a central authority for

- Health care
- Public health protection
- Health research activities
- Directly controlled health facilities, handling with drugs preparations, and other agents
- Search, protection and use of natural health resources, natural spas and mineral water resources
- Medicaments and technical equipment for prevention, diagnostics and treatment of people,
- Health insurance and health information system.

Part of the Ministry of Health is also the Czech Spa Inspectorate and the organizational part of the Ministry of Health is also the Inspectorate of Narcotic Drugs and Psychotropic Substances.

== Ministers ==
Portrait	Minister (Birth-Death)	Term of office			Political party	Ministry	Prime Minister
Portrait	Minister (Birth-Death)	From	To	Period	Political party	Ministry	Prime Minister
	Petr Lom (1935–2003)	1 January 1993	22 June 1993	172 days	Civic Democratic Party	Klaus I	Václav Klaus
	Luděk Rubáš (born 1953)	23 June 1993	10 October 1995	2 years, 109 days	Civic Democratic Party	Klaus I	Václav Klaus
	Jan Stráský (1940–2019)	10 October 1995	4 July 1996	2 years, 84 days	Civic Democratic Party	Klaus I	Václav Klaus
	Jan Stráský (1940–2019)	4 July 1996	2 January 1998	2 years, 84 days	Civic Democratic Party	Klaus II	Václav Klaus
	Zuzana Roithová (born 1953)	2 January 1998	22 July 1998	201 days	Independent	Tošovský	Josef Tošovský
	Ivan David (born 1952)	22 July 1998	9 December 1999	1 year, 140 days	Social Democracy	Zeman	Miloš Zeman
	Vladimír Špidla (born 1951) (Deputy Prime Minister) (Acting)	9 December 1999	9 February 2000	62 days	Social Democracy	Zeman	Miloš Zeman
	Bohumil Fišer (1943–2011)	9 February 2000	15 July 2002	2 years, 156 days	Social Democracy	Zeman	Miloš Zeman
	Marie Součková (born 1953)	15 July 2002	14 April 2004	1 year, 274 days	Social Democracy	Špidla	Vladimír Špidla
	Jozef Kubinyi (born 1955)	14 April 2004	4 August 2004	112 days	Social Democracy	Špidla	Vladimír Špidla
	Milada Emmerová (born 1944)	4 August 2004	25 April 2005	1 year, 69 days	Social Democracy	Gross	Stanislav Gross
	Milada Emmerová (born 1944)	25 April 2005	12 October 2005	1 year, 69 days	Social Democracy	Paroubek	Jiří Paroubek
	Zdeněk Škromach (born 1956) (Acting)	12 October 2005	4 November 2005	23 days	Social Democracy	Paroubek	Jiří Paroubek
	David Rath (born 1965)	4 November 2005	4 September 2006	304 days	Social Democracy	Paroubek	Jiří Paroubek
	Tomáš Julínek (born 1956)	4 September 2006	9 January 2007	2 years, 141 days	Civic Democratic Party	Topolánek I	Mirek Topolánek
	Tomáš Julínek (born 1956)	9 January 2007	23 January 2009	2 years, 141 days	Civic Democratic Party	Topolánek II	Mirek Topolánek
	Daniela Filipiová (born 1957)	23 January 2009	8 May 2009	105 days	Civic Democratic Party	Topolánek II	Mirek Topolánek
	Dana Jurásková (born 1961)	8 May 2009	13 July 2010	1 year, 66 days	Civic Democratic Party	Fischer	Jan Fischer
	Leoš Heger (born 1948)	13 July 2010	10 July 2013	2 years, 362 days	TOP 09	Nečas	Petr Nečas
	Martin Holcát (born 1954)	10 July 2013	29 January 2014	203 days	Independent	Rusnok	Jiří Rusnok
	Svatopluk Němeček (born 1972)	29 January 2014	30 November 2016	2 years, 306 days	Social Democracy	Sobotka	Bohuslav Sobotka
	Miloslav Ludvík (born 1963)	1 December 2016	13 December 2017	1 year, 12 days	Social Democracy	Sobotka	Bohuslav Sobotka
	Adam Vojtěch (born 1986)	13 December 2017	27 June 2018	2 years, 283 days	Independent	Babiš I	Andrej Babiš
	Adam Vojtěch (born 1986)	27 June 2018	21 September 2020	2 years, 283 days	Independent	Babiš II	Andrej Babiš
	Roman Prymula (born 1964)	21 September 2020	29 October 2020	38 days	Independent	Babiš II	Andrej Babiš
	Jan Blatný (born 1970)	29 October 2020	7 April 2021	160 days	Independent	Babiš II	Andrej Babiš
	Petr Arenberger (born 1958)	7 April 2021	26 May 2021	49 days	Independent	Babiš II	Andrej Babiš
	Adam Vojtěch (born 1986)	26 May 2021	17 December 2021	205 days	Independent	Babiš II	Andrej Babiš
	Vlastimil Válek (born 1960) (Deputy Prime Minister)	17 December 2021	15 December 2025	3 years, 363 days	TOP 09	Fiala	Petr Fiala
	Adam Vojtěch (born 1986)	15 December 2025	Incumbent	236 days	Independent	Babiš III	Andrej Babiš

== See also ==
- Healthcare in the Czech Republic
- Timeline of ministers on Wikidata
