= Andrej Babiš' Cabinet =

Andrej Babiš' Cabinet may refer to:

- Andrej Babiš' First Cabinet
- Andrej Babiš' Second Cabinet
- Third cabinet of Andrej Babiš
