= Cabinet of Bohuslav Sobotka =

- 13th Cabinet of Czech Republic
- 29 January 2014 - 13 December 2017
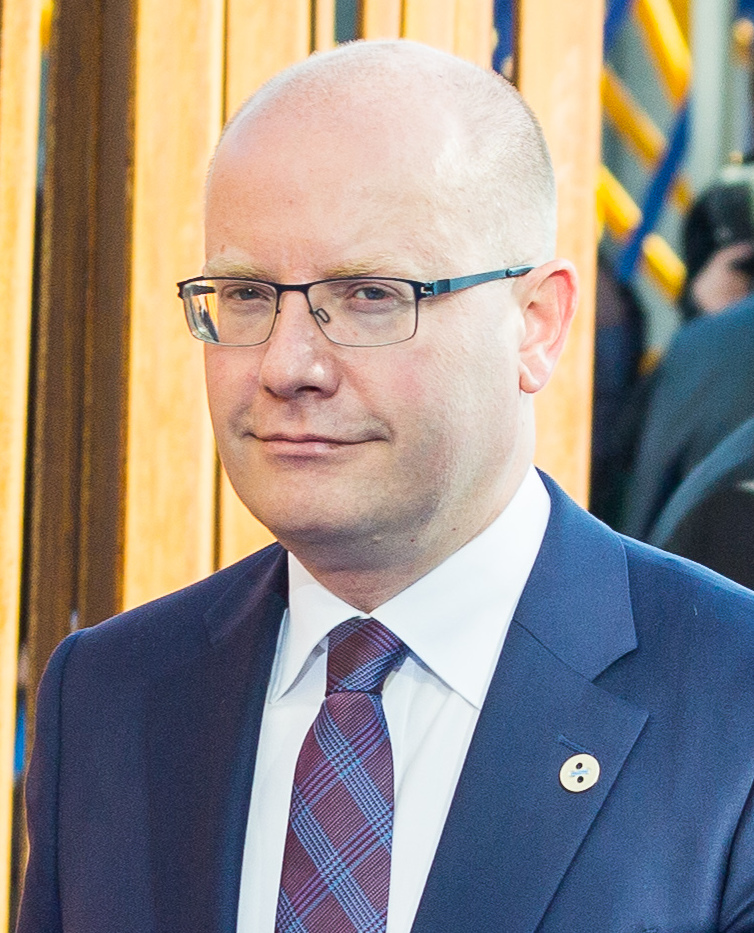
- Bohuslav Sobotka, Prime Minister
- Date formed: 29 January 2014
- Date dissolved: 13 December 2017

People and organisations
- Head of state: Miloš Zeman
- Head of government: Bohuslav Sobotka
- Deputy head of government: Richard Brabec; Pavel Bělobrádek
- No. of ministers: 15
- Total no. of members: 17
- Member parties: Czech Social Democratic Party (ČSSD); ANO 2011 (ANO); Christian and Democratic Union – Czechoslovak People's Party (KDU-ČSL)
- Status in legislature: Majority (Coalition)
- Opposition parties: Communist Party of Bohemia and Moravia; TOP 09; Civic Democratic Party (ODS); Dawn of Direct Democracy
- Opposition leader: Vojtěch Filip

History
- Election: 2013 Czech legislative election
- Predecessor: Rusnok
- Successor: Babiš I

Cabinet of Bohuslav Sobotka was the governing body of the Czech Republic from 2014 to 2017. Bohuslav Sobotka was designated Prime Minister by President Miloš Zeman on 17 January 2014. The cabinet was sworn in on 29 January 2014. It was replaced by Andrej Babiš' Cabinet in December 2017.

The members of the government were Czech Social Democratic Party (ČSSD), ANO 2011 (ANO) and Christian and Democratic Union – Czechoslovak People's Party (KDU-ČSL) as coalition agreement with eight senior ministers from ČSSD, six from ANO, and three from KDU-ČSL.

== Government ministers ==
Ministry	Minister	Political party	In office
Prime Minister	Bohuslav Sobotka	ČSSD	January 17, 2014 – December 13, 2017
First Deputy Prime Minister (from May 24, 2017); Minister of the Environment	Richard Brabec	ANO	January 29, 2014 – December 13, 2017 (continues in Andrej Babiš' First Cabinet and Andrej Babiš' Second Cabinet)
First Deputy Prime Minister; Minister of Finance	Andrej Babiš	ANO	January 29, 2014 – May 24, 2017
Deputy Prime Minister; Minister of Science and Research	Pavel Bělobrádek	KDU-ČSL	January 29, 2014 – December 13, 2017
Minister of Finance	Ivan Pilný	ANO	May 24, 2017 – December 13, 2017
Minister of Foreign Affairs	Lubomír Zaorálek	ČSSD	January 29, 2014 – December 13, 2017
Minister of Interior	Milan Chovanec	ČSSD	January 29, 2014 – December 13, 2017
Minister of Labour and Social Affairs	Michaela Marksová	ČSSD	January 29, 2014 – December 13, 2017
Minister of Industry and Trade	Jan Mládek	ČSSD	January 29, 2014 – February 28, 2017
Minister of Industry and Trade	Jiří Havlíček	ČSSD	April 4, 2017 – December 13, 2017
Minister of Health	Svatopluk Němeček	ČSSD	January 29, 2014 – November 30, 2016
Minister of Health	Miloslav Ludvík	ČSSD	December 1, 2016 – December 13, 2017
Minister of Justice	Helena Válková	ANO	January 29, 2014 – March 1, 2015
Minister of Justice	Robert Pelikán	ANO	March 12, 2015 – December 13, 2017 (continues in Andrej Babiš' First Cabinet)
Minister of Education, Youth and Sport	Marcel Chládek	ČSSD	January 29, 2014 – June 5, 2015
Minister of Education, Youth and Sport	Kateřina Valachová	ČSSD	June 17, 2015 – June 21, 2017
Minister of Education, Youth and Sport	Stanislav Štech	ČSSD	June 21, 2017 – December 13, 2017
Minister of Defence	Martin Stropnický	ANO	January 29, 2014 – December 13, 2017
Minister of Transport	Antonín Prachař	ANO	January 29, 2014 - November 13, 2014
Minister of Transport	Dan Ťok	ANO	December 4, 2014 – December 13, 2017 (continues in Andrej Babiš' First Cabinet and Andrej Babiš' Second Cabinet)
Minister for Regional Development	Věra Jourová	ANO	January 29, 2014 – October 3, 2014
Minister for Regional Development	Karla Šlechtová	ANO	October 8, 2014 – December 13, 2017
Minister of Agriculture	Marian Jurečka	KDU-ČSL	January 29, 2014 – December 13, 2017
Minister of Culture	Daniel Herman	KDU-ČSL	January 29, 2014 – December 13, 2017
Minister for Human Rights and Equal Opportunities	Jiří Dienstbier Jr.	ČSSD	January 29, 2014 – November 30, 2016
Minister for Human Rights and Equal Opportunities	Jan Chvojka	ČSSD	December 1, 2016 - December 13, 2017

== Party Composition ==
Party	Ideology	Leader	Deputies	Ministers
ČSSD	Social democracy	Bohuslav Sobotka	50 / 200	8 / 17
ANO	Liberalism	Andrej Babiš	47 / 200	6 / 17
KDU-ČSL	Christian democracy	Pavel Bělobrádek	14 / 200	3 / 17
Total			111 / 200	17
