= 2022 Czech Pirate Party leadership election =

- 8 January 2022
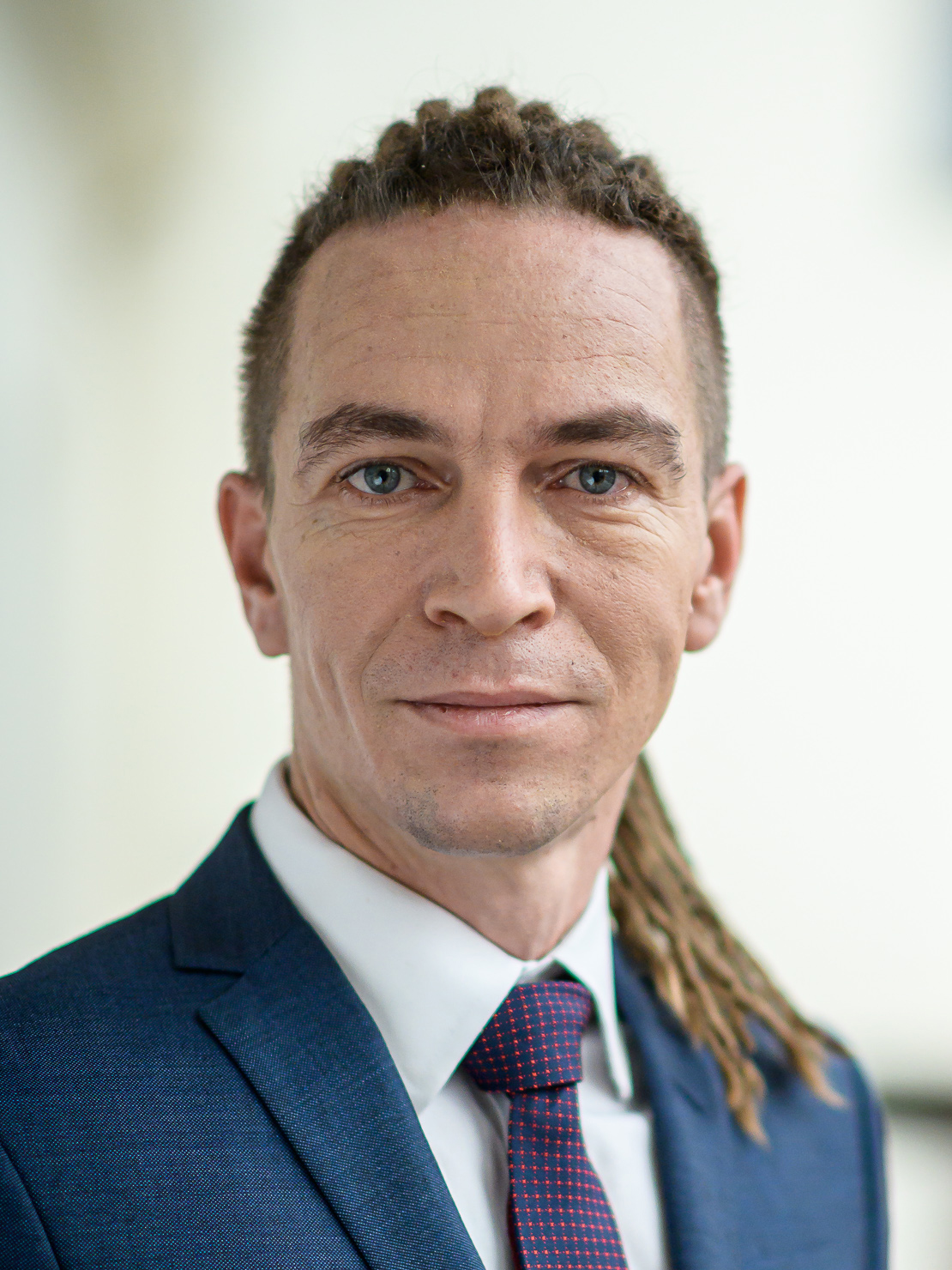

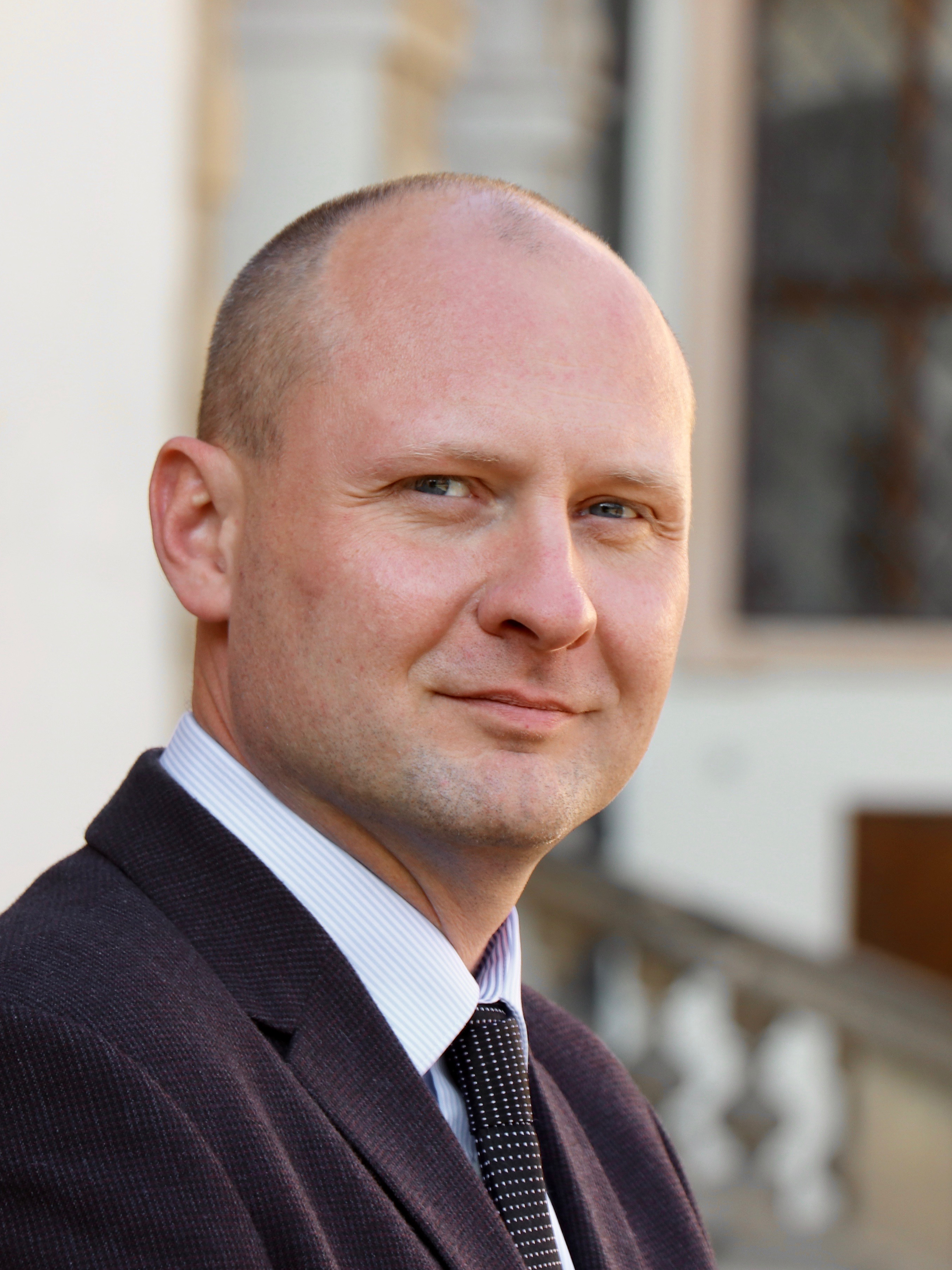
Candidate	Ivan Bartoš	Lukáš Wagenknecht
Popular vote	662	265
Percentage	69.83%	27.95%
Leader of Pirates before election
Ivan Bartoš
Elected Leader of Pirates
Ivan Bartoš

The Czech Pirate Party held a leadership election on 8 January 2022, following the party's poor performance in the 2021 Czech parliamentary election. Ivan Bartoš was reelected, defeating Senator Lukáš Wagenknecht in the final round.

== Background ==
The Czech Pirate Party has been led by Ivan Bartoš since 2016. Under his leadership, they became the third largest party in the Czech Republic after the 2017 parliamentary election, with 22 seats. Bartoš also led the party during the 2021 election, which the party contested as part of the Pirates and Mayors electoral alliance. Due to preferential voting, the Pirates received only 4 seats of the 37 seats won by the alliance. After the election, a part of the membership called for Bartoš's resignation. The party joined the new government following the election.

On 13 December 2021, Senator Lukáš Wagenknecht announced his candidacy for party leader. He said that the situation within the party was not good, as it was becoming "a submissive political accessory with only 4 MPs." He expressed concern that the failure in the 2021 parliamentary election could repeat itself in municipal elections in 2022. Bartoš himself stated that he was yet to decide whether to run for another term. Jana Kolaříková and Jana Michailidu also announced their intention to run. Bartoš announced his candidacy on 16 December 2021. He admitted during the announcement that he was partly to blame for the party's poor result in the parliamentary election, but expressed the belief that "even though the situation is hard the party will become more experienced and will be stronger." Eva Horáková was also running for the position at the time. David Witosz later announced his candidacy, saying that the Pirate Party should not become a party of one man. On 3 January 2022, Bartoš, Michailidu, Wagenknecht and Witosz were reported to be the official candidates.

Michailidu gained widespread media attention when she described herself as a "democratic Communist". Michailidu received seven nominations, Bartoš four, Wagenknecht three, and Witosz one.

== Candidates ==
- Ivan Bartoš, incumbent leader and Minister of Regional Development.
- Jana Michailidu, member of republic committee.
- Lukáš Wagenknecht, Senator.
- David Witosz, Deputy Mayor of Moravská Ostrava a Přívoz.

=== Announced but did not run ===
- Eva Horáková, member of Prague assembly.
- Jana Kolaříková, Deputy Chairwoman of South Bohemian branch.

== Results ==
Bartoš and Wagenknecht advanced to the second round, in which Bartoš received 662 of 948 votes, against 265 for Wagenknecht.

Results
Candidate	1st round	2nd round
Ivan Bartoš	728	662
Lukáš Wagenknecht	484	265
David Witosz	355	eliminated
Jana Michailidu	285	eliminated
