= Senate district 23 – Prague 8 =

Electoral district in the Czech Republic

Coordinates: 50°07′51″N 14°28′39″E

23 – Prague 8
- inline Senate district of the Czech Republic

- The Prague-8 district on a map
- Senator: Vladimíra Ludková; Civic Democratic Party
- Region: Capital City of Prague
- District: Prague
- Electorate: 103912
- Area: 47.76 km²
- Last election: 2024
- Next election: 2030

Senate district 23 – Prague 8 is an electoral district of the Senate of the Czech Republic, which is entirely located in the Capital City of Prague. From 2024, a ODS member Vladimíra Ludková is representing the district.

== Senators ==
Year	Senator	Party
1996 (Note: Election for shortened four-year term)	Alena Palečková	ODS
2000	Alena Palečková	ODS
2006	Alena Palečková	ODS
2012	Daniela Filipiová	ODS
2018	Lukáš Wagenknecht	Pirates
2024	Vladimíra Ludková	ODS

== Election results ==
=== 1996 ===
1996 Czech Senate election in Prague 8
Candidate	Party	1st round		2nd round	
Candidate	Party	Votes	%	Votes	%
Alena Palečková	ODS	16 121	40,10	23 589	62,63
Stanislav Křeček	ČSSD	7 869	19,57	14 075	37,37
Cyril Höschl	ODA	6 418	15,96	—	—
Rudolf Battěk	Independent	4 441	11,05	—	—
František Beneš	KSČM	3 930	9,77	—	—
Ivan Vyskočil	DEU	1 123	2,79	—	—
Václav Papež	KSČ	303	0,75	—	—

=== 2000 ===
2000 Czech Senate election in Prague 8
Candidate	Party	1st round		2nd round	
Candidate	Party	Votes	%	Votes	%
Alena Palečková	ODS	8 383	29,62	8 959	51,65
Jiřina Voňková	4KOALICE	5 212	18,42	8 386	48,34
František Beneš	KSČM	4 439	15,68	—	—
Jiří Paroubek	ČSSD	4 026	14,22	—	—
Petr Cibulka	PB	4 012	14,18	—	—
Jiří Novák	NEZ	2 221	7,84	—	—

=== 2006 ===
2006 Czech Senate election in Prague 8
Candidate	Party	1st round		2nd round	
Candidate	Party	Votes	%	Votes	%
Alena Palečková	ODS	14 930	40,54	12 845	57,97
Michael Hvížďala	Independent	5 202	14,12	9 312	42,02
Jiří Patočka	ČSSD	4 673	12,69	—	—
Jiří Randák	KSČM	3 569	9,69	—	—
Jiří Dědeček	SZ	3 496	9,49	—	—
Zdeněk Bašný	SNK ED	2 970	8,06	—	—
Václav Musílek	NPP	961	2,60	—	—
Libuše Barková	Independent	296	0,80	—	—
Zdenka Ulmannová	SRŠ	278	0,75	—	—
Ivo Patta	4 VIZE	175	0,47	—	—
Jiří Fiala	SZR	160	0,43	—	—
Karel Erben	ČP	110	0,29	—	—

=== 2012 ===
2012 Czech Senate election in Prague 8
Candidate	Party	1st round		2nd round	
Candidate	Party	Votes	%	Votes	%
Daniela Filipiová	ODS	6 468	21,71	19 284	62,42
Jiří Dolejš	KSČM	6 568	22,05	11 606	37,57
Martin Potůček	ČSSD, KDU-ČSL, SZ	6 370	21,38	—	—
Viliam Buchert	TOP 09, STAN	3 340	11,21	—	—
Miroslav Koranda	Independent	1 857	6,23	—	—
Lenka Procházková	VV	1 508	5,06	—	—
Petr Binder	ANO 2011	1 468	4,92	—	—
Dagmar Jungová	PP	693	2,32	—	—
Marek Merhaut	SsČR	597	2,00	—	—
Ariana Shametiová	KONS	412	1,38	—	—
Jan Zenkl	ČSNS	311	1,04	—	—
Bohdan Babinec	NÁR.SOC.	193	0,64	—	—

=== 2018 ===
2018 Czech Senate election in Prague 8
Candidate	Party	1st round		2nd round	
Candidate	Party	Votes	%	Votes	%
Lukáš Wagenknecht	Pirates	8 230	18,15	10 318	54,45
Pavel Dungl	TOP 09, STAN	6 932	15,29	8 631	45,54
Milan Golas	ODS	5 893	12,99	—	—
Jiří Haramul	ANO 2011	5 755	12,69	—	—
Hayato Okamura	KDU-ČSL	5 326	11,74	—	—
Roman Petrus	ČSSD	2 486	5,48	—	—
Josef Nosek	HPP	2 331	5,14	—	—
Jiří Witzany	SNK ED	2 140	4,72	—	—
Luděk Kula	SPD	1 849	4,07	—	—
Vladislav Kopal	KSČM	1 732	3,82	—	—
Petr Hannig	SZR	997	2,19	—	—
Michal Malý	Svobodní	541	1,19	—	—
Hana Dolejší	Patriots ČR	467	1,03	—	—
Vladimíra Vítová	BPI, ČSNS 2005, ČS, ANS, ZpL	390	0,86	—	—
Marta Chovancová	SSPD-SP	222	0,48	—	—
Jiří Doubek	NáS	41	0,09	—	—

=== 2024 ===
2024 Czech Senate election in Prague 8
Candidate	Party	1st round		2nd round	
Candidate	Party	Votes	%	Votes	%
Vladimíra Ludková	ODS, KDU-ČSL, Patriots ČR	7 409	25,14	13 978	67,48
Zdeněk Kučera	ANO 2011	6 857	23,26	6 734	32,51
Lukáš Wagenknecht	Pirates	6 779	23,00	—	—
Jan Korda	TOP 09	3 871	13,13	—	—
Miroslav Erbrt	Svobodní	1 964	6,66	—	—
Vítězslav Novák	SPD, Tricolour	1 311	4,44	—	—
Pavel Fischer	Tabby Cat	922	3,12	—	—
David Kopecký	SOCDEM	355	1,20	—	—
