= French National AIDS Council =

The French National AIDS Council (French: Conseil national du sida) is an advisory body established in 1989 with a mission of "to offer its views on the problems faced by society as a result of AIDS and to make useful suggestions to the government".

== History ==
Since its appearance in the 1980s, the HIV/AIDS epidemic has constantly posed new questions, both to society and to the international community. As a political, social and cultural as well as a scientific challenge, the fight against AIDS has required the definition of new approaches to public health, integrating into reflection on prevention and therapeutic care issues such as the rights of sick people or vulnerable in society, community mobilisations, the fight against stigma and discrimination linked to gender, sexual orientation or the socio-economic situation of those affected.

To address these multiple issues, Professor Claude Got suggested in a report submitted in 1988 to the Minister of Health, the creation of a "national council for reflection on AIDS so as not to leave the government alone in the face of this situation".

The National AIDS Council (CNS) was therefore created by decree of the President of the Republic, codified in 2003 in the Public Health Code and amended in 2007. The missions of the CNS were extended to viral hepatitis and STIs in 2015.
