= Daniela Filipiová =

Czech architect and politician (born 1957)

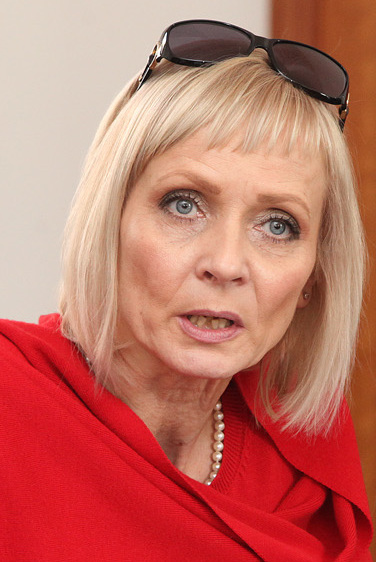

Minister of Health
- In office 23 January 2009 – 8 May 2009
- Prime Minister: Mirek Topolánek
- Preceded by: Tomáš Julínek
- Succeeded by: Dana Jurásková

Senator from Prague 8
- In office 20 October 2012 – 20 October 2018
- Preceded by: Alena Palečková
- Succeeded by: Lukáš Wagenknecht

Senator from Prague 2
- In office 19 November 2000 – 28 October 2012
- Preceded by: Vladimír Zeman
- Succeeded by: Libor Michálek

Personal details
- Born: 9 August 1957 (age 69) Prague, Czechoslovakia
- Party: ODS
- Education: Czech Technical University in Prague
- Occupation: politician, architect

Daniela Filipiová (born 9 August 1957) is a Czech architect and politician. She served as Minister of Health for the Czech Republic from 23 January 2009 to 8 May 2009. A member of the Civic Democratic Party (ODS) Filipiová was a Senator representing Prague 8.

== Early life and career ==
Filipiová graduated from the Czech Technical University in Prague in 1983 with a degree in architecture. She married and had a daughter, but was troubled by persistent back problems. In 1986 she underwent spinal cord surgery which left her paralyzed from the waist down. Nonetheless, she continued her career, remarried and had a second daughter. Filipiová is the author of several books: Život bez bariér (Life Without Barriers), Tvorba bezbariérové prostředí (Creating a barrier-free environment) and Projektujeme bez bariér (Designing without Barriers).

== Minister of Health ==
On 23 January 2009, she assumed the position of Minister of Health under Prime Minister Mirek Topolánek replacing Tomáš Julínek. No new policy changes were made under her administration, but she sought to negotiate to get as much of the Julínek reforms through as possible. She officially resigned on 26 March 2009 when the government of PM Topolánek fell, but continued to serve in the caretaker government until 8 May 2009 when the government of Prime Minister Jan Fischer took office and Dana Jurásková became the Minister of Health.

== Notes ==
Government offices
Preceded by Tomáš Julínek	Minister of Health of the Czech Republic; 2009	Succeeded by Dana Jurásková
