= First cabinet of Andrej Babiš =

Czech governing body from 2017 to 2018

First Cabinet of Andrej Babiš
- 14th Cabinet of Czech Republic
- 13 December 2017 - 27 June 2018
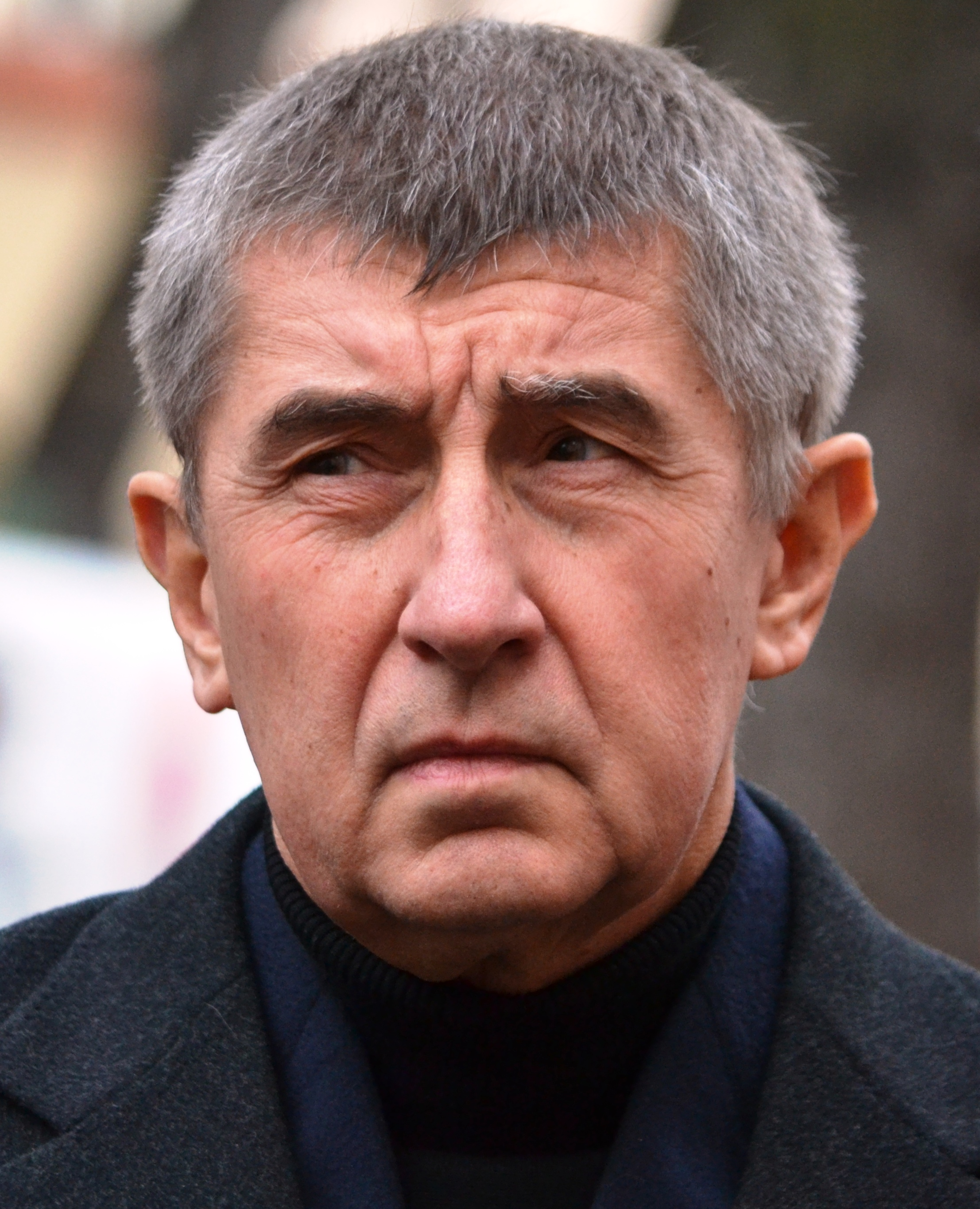
- Andrej Babiš, Prime Minister
- Date formed: 13 December 2017
- Date dissolved: 27 June 2018

People and organisations
- Head of state: Miloš Zeman
- Head of government: Andrej Babiš
- No. of ministers: 14
- Total no. of members: 14
- Member parties: ANO 2011
- Status in legislature: Minority
- Opposition parties: ODS; Piráti; SPD; KSČM; ČSSD; KDU-ČSL; TOP 09; STAN

History
- Election: 2017 Czech legislative election
- Predecessor: Sobotka
- Successor: Babiš II

The first cabinet of Andrej Babiš was the governing body of the Czech Republic from 13 December 2017 until it was succeeded by the second cabinet of Andrej Babiš on 27 June 2018. Andrej Babiš was designated Prime Minister by President Miloš Zeman on 6 December 2017. The cabinet was appointed on 13 December 2017. It consisted of 14 ministers.

On 16 January 2018 the cabinet failed a confidence vote in the Chamber of Deputies of the Czech Republic, by 78 to 117.

== Government Ministers ==
Portfolio	Minister	Took office	Left office	Party
Prime Minister	Andrej Babiš	6 December 2017	27 June 2018	ANO
Deputy Prime Minister; Minister of Foreign Affairs	Martin Stropnický	13 December 2017	27 June 2018	ANO
Deputy Prime Minister; Minister of the Environment	Richard Brabec	13 December 2017	27 June 2018	ANO
Minister of Finance	Alena Schillerová	13 December 2017	27 June 2018	Independent
Minister of Interior	Lubomír Metnar	13 December 2017	27 June 2018	Independent
Minister of Health	Adam Vojtěch	13 December 2017	27 June 2018	Independent
Minister of Labour and Social Affairs	Jaroslava Němcová	13 December 2017	27 June 2018	ANO
Minister of Industry and Trade	Tomáš Hüner	13 December 2017	27 June 2018	Independent
Minister of Justice	Robert Pelikán	13 December 2017	27 June 2018	Independent
Minister of Education, Youth and Sport	Robert Plaga	13 December 2017	27 June 2018	ANO
Minister of Defence	Karla Šlechtová	13 December 2017	27 June 2018	Independent
Minister of Transport	Dan Ťok	13 December 2017	27 June 2018	Independent
Minister for Regional Development	Klára Dostálová	13 December 2017	27 June 2018	Independent
Minister of Agriculture	Jiří Milek	13 December 2017	27 June 2018	Independent
Minister of Culture	Ilja Šmíd	13 December 2017	27 June 2018	Independent
