= Martin Holcát =

Czech doctor, professor and politician

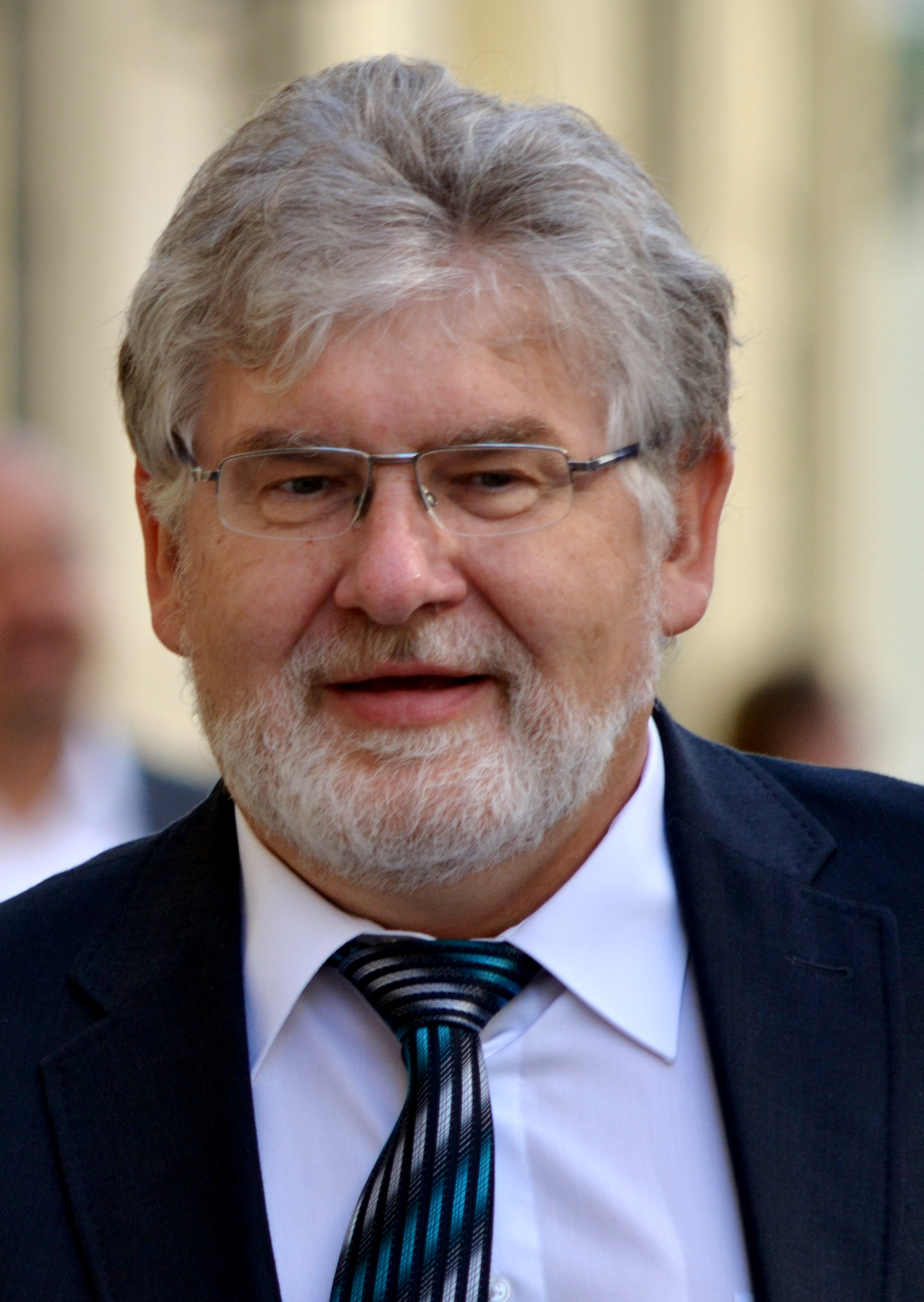

17th Minister of Health of the Czech Republic
- In office 10 July 2013 – 29 January 2014
- Prime Minister: Jiří Rusnok
- Preceded by: Leoš Heger
- Succeeded by: Svatopluk Němeček

Personal details
- Born: 23 April 1954 (age 72) Prague, Czechoslovakia (now Czech Republic)
- Party: nonpartisan
- Education: First Faculty of Medicine, Charles University in Prague

Martin Holcát (born 23 April 1954 in Prague) is a Czech doctor, professor and politician. He was a former director of the General University Hospital in Prague from March 1997 to November 2003. From July 2013 to January 2014 he was the Czech Minister of Health in the cabinet of Jiří Rusnok.

Holcát graduated in 1981 with his medical degree from Charles University in Prague, where he specialized in otolaryngology.

In March 1999 Holcát entered politics when asked to be the deputy Minister of Health under Health Minister Ivan David. Upon David's departure in February 1999, Holcát ran the ministry for three months until Bohumil Fišer took office, although technically Vladimír Špidla, the first Deputy Prime Minister, was in charge.

== Notes and references ==
Government offices
| Preceded by Leoš Heger | Minister of Health of the Czech Republic; July 2013 – January 2014 | Succeeded by Svatopluk Němeček |
