= Adam Vojtěch =

Czech politician and lawyer

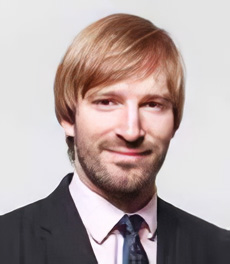
- Vojtěch in 2020

Minister of Health
- Incumbent
- Assumed office 15 December 2025
- Prime Minister: Andrej Babiš
- Preceded by: Vlastimil Válek
- In office 26 May 2021 – 17 December 2021
- Prime Minister: Andrej Babiš
- Preceded by: Petr Arenberger
- Succeeded by: Vlastimil Válek
- In office 13 December 2017 – 21 September 2020
- Prime Minister: Andrej Babiš
- Preceded by: Miloslav Ludvík
- Succeeded by: Roman Prymula

Member of the Chamber of Deputies
- In office 21 October 2017 – 21 October 2021

Personal details
- Born: 2 October 1986 (age 40) České Budějovice, Czechoslovakia (now Czech Republic)
- Party: Independent (2018–present); ODS (2012–2018)
- Spouse: Olga Vojtěch (m. 2019)
- Children: 2
- Education: Charles University in Prague
- Website: www.adamvojtech.cz

Adam Vojtěch (born 2 October 1986) is a Czech politician and lawyer serving as Minister of Health since 15 December 2025, in the third cabinet of Andrej Babiš. He previously served as Minister of Health from 13 December 2017 to 21 September 2020, in both the first and second cabinets of Prime Minister Andrej Babiš, and then for a second time from May until December 2021. He was a member of the Chamber of Deputies from 2017 until 2021.

== Early life and education ==
In 2005, Vojtěch reached the semi-finals of Česko hledá SuperStar, the Czech version of the Idol franchise.

Vojtěch graduated from the faculty of social studies of Charles University in Prague in 2009, with a degree in media and communication studies. After a period of study at University College Dublin in Ireland, he returned to study at Charles University's faculty of law, and again at the faculty of social sciences. Since 2017 he has been associated with the university's First Faculty of Medicine.

== Early career ==
Vojtěch was head of the Všehrd Lawyers' Association from 2010 to 2012, before working as a lawyer for Mafra, the media group that is a subsidiary of Babiš' Agrofert business empire. From 2014 to 2017 Vojtěch worked as Babiš' private secretary while he was Minister of Finance.

== Political career ==
=== Early political career ===
Since 2015, Vojtěch has been the chairman of the supervisory board of the state-owned enterprise State Printer of Cenin.

In September 2016, the Czech government appointed him a member of the board of directors of the General Health Insurance Company (VZP), a position he held until January 2018. In March 2021, Vojtěch became the chair of the VZP board, but left in May due to his re-appointment as a minister.

Vojtěch was a member of the Civic Democratic Party (ODS) from 2012 to 2018, though he has also said he suspended his membership in 2014. In June 2018, his ODS membership was canceled by the party due to his cooperation with the Communist Party in the framework of the Second Cabinet of Andrej Babiš.

=== Minister of Health ===
In the 2017 Czech parliamentary election, Vojtěch was elected as a non-party representative for the ANO 2011 movement as a deputy in the South Bohemian Region, from third place on the candidate list. He was subsequently named as Minister of Health in the First Cabinet of Andrej Babiš, appointed to the position on 13 December by president Miloš Zeman. At the end of June 2018, Babiš named Vojtěch as minister of health again in his second government, and he was appointed by Zeman on 27 June.

Vojtěch resigned as Minister of Health in September 2020 due to a rapid increase in the number of coronavirus cases in the country. At a press conference following the announcement of Vojtěch's resignation, Babiš said that Vojtěch had brought decency to Czech politics. Epidemiologist Rastislav Maďar stated that Vojtěch was one of the best post-recession ministers of health.

=== Post-Babiš premiership ===
After the resignation of Petr Arenberger in May 2021, Vojtěch was appointed Minister of Health for a second time. He was appointed as the Czech ambassador to Finland on 14 February 2022.

== Criticism ==
At the end of December 2017, during an appearance with Jaromír Soukup on TV Barrandov, Vojtěch was asked to give a male assessment of the physical attractiveness of selected Czech female politicians on a magnetic bulletin board. His answers were subsequently criticised by Markéta Pekarová Adamová and Olga Richterová.

As department secretary of the Ministry of Finance led by Andrej Babiš, Vojtěch collaborated with businessman Tomáš Horáček, who was accused in June 2019 of manipulating hospital orders. Vojtěch confirmed this cooperation in interviews for Czech Radio. Through Horáček, he had received information about topics including the management of Czech Television and the income of the wife of ČSSD Minister of Health, Svatopluk Němeček.

== Personal life ==
In 2019, Vojtěch married his long-time girlfriend, Olga. Their son, Matyáš Antonín, was born in September 2023 and their daughter, Emílie Anna, in October 2025.
