= Leoš Heger =

Czech politician and doctor (born 1948)

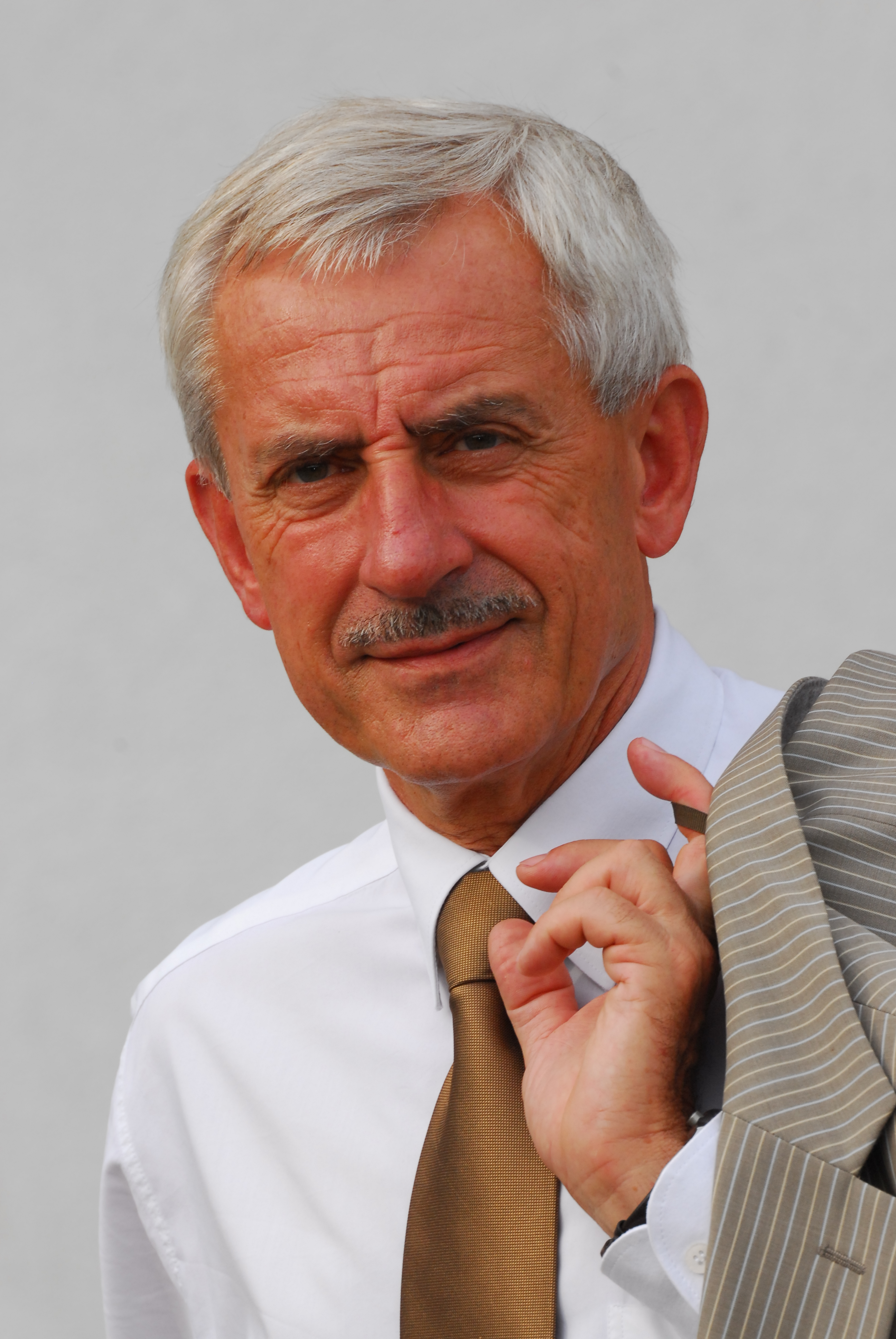

14th Minister of Health
- In office 13 July 2010 – 10 July 2013
- Prime Minister: Petr Nečas
- Preceded by: Dana Jurásková
- Succeeded by: Martin Holcát

Member of the Chamber of Deputies
- In office 29 May 2010 – 21 October 2017

Personal details
- Born: 11 July 1948 (age 78) Hradec Králové, Czechoslovakia
- Party: TOP 09
- Education: Charles University
- Occupation: pedagogue, doctor
- Website: www.leosheger.cz

Leoš Heger (born 11 February 1948 in Hradec Králové) is a Czech doctor, university lecturer and politician. He was the Czech Minister of Health in the cabinet of Petr Nečas from July 2010 to July 2013.

Government offices
Preceded by Dana Jurásková	Minister of Health of the Czech Republic; July 2010 - July 2013	Succeeded by Martin Holcát
