= Klára Dostálová =

Czech politician

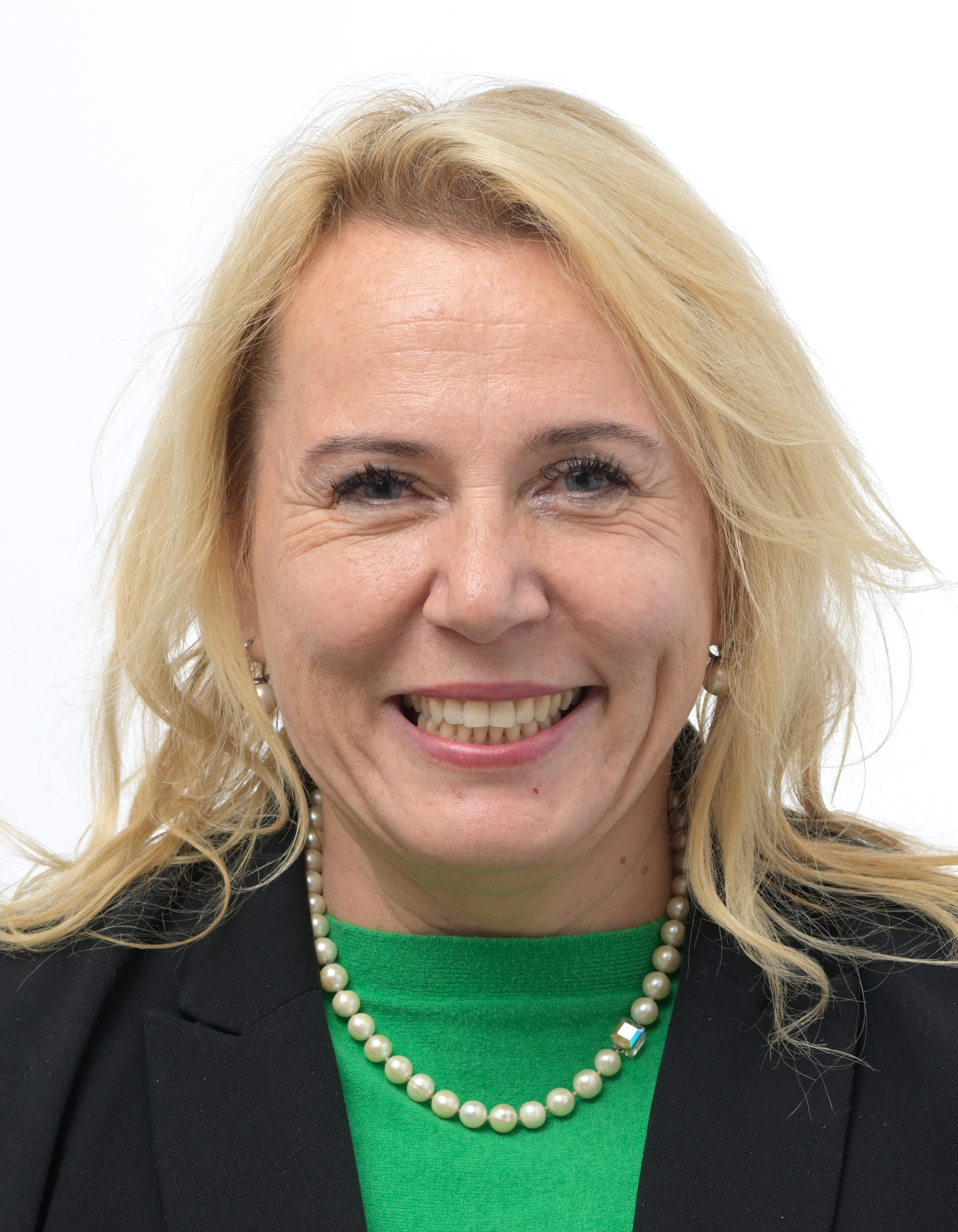
- Official portrait, 2024

Member of the European Parliament for Czech Republic
- Incumbent
- Assumed office 16 July 2024

Minister for Local Development
- In office 13 December 2017 – 17 December 2021
- Prime Minister: Andrej Babiš
- Preceded by: Karla Šlechtová
- Succeeded by: Ivan Bartoš

Member of the Chamber of Deputies
- In office 21 October 2017 – 15 July 2024

Personal details
- Born: 13 March 1971 (age 55) Prague, Czechoslovakia
- Party: ANO 2011
- Children: 2
- Education: Prague University of Economics and Business
- Occupation: Economist • Politician

Klára Dostálová (born 13 March 1971) is a Czech politician and economist who has been a member of the Chamber of Deputies of the Czech Republic since 2017. She served as Deputy Minister of Local Development in the Second Cabinet of Andrej Babiš from 2014 to 2017 before being appointed permanently from December 2017 until 2021. In 2020, Dostálová returned to the council of the Hradec Králové region, of which she has been a member from 2016 until 2017. Dostálová is active in politics as a non-party member of the ANO movement.

== Early life ==
Dostálová served as chairwoman of the Center for European Design between 2009 and 2014. She faced suspicions of manipulating the repair of Hořice Square, in which CEP prepared an application for a subsidiary, where her father Vilém Tvrdík subsequently won the tender.

Dostálová was also involved in the non-profit company Revitalizace KUKS ops, which has been in liquidation since 6 January 2023, where she served as chairwoman of directors board. Since 2014, Dostálová has been a member of the board of directors of the Mountain Service of the Czech Republic.

== Political career ==
=== Deputy Minister for Local Development ===
In February 2014, Dostálová replaced Věra Jourová as Deputy Minister for Local Development of the Czech Republic. Dostálová remained at the ministry even after the arrival of new minister Karla Šlechtová. The same year on 10 November, Dostálová also became first deputy minister of regional development.

In the 2016 Czech regional elections, Dostálová was the leading candidate of the ANO movement in the Hradec Králové Region from the position of a non-party member and was elected as a representative. However, she resigned from the representative mandate in April 2017 due to the incompatibility of the functions of regional representative and deputy minister for regional development. The opinion on the incompatibility of the functions was promoted by the Ministry of the Interior of the Czech Republic. Dostálová disagreed with this opinion and did not want to leave the region in legal uncertainty.

=== Cabinets of Andrej Babiš ===
In the 2017 Czech parliamentary election, Dostálová was a non-party leader of the ANO movement in the Hradec Králové region, receiving 5,237 preferential votes and thus became a member of parliament. Between November and December 2017, she became a candidate for the post of Minister for Local Development of the Czech Republic in the emerging First Cabinet of Andrej Babiš. On 13 December 2017, President Miloš Zeman appointed her to this position.

In 2018, Babiš requested Dostálová to be Minister for Regional Development of the Czech Republic in his second government, appointed by President Miloš Zeman on 27 June. In the 2020 Czech regional elections, Dostálová was elected as a representative of the Hradec Králové region as a member of ANO 2011.

=== Post-Babiš premiership ===
In the 2021 parliamentary election, she was the leading candidate of in the Hradec Králové region from the position of a non-party member. Dostálová received 4,446 preferential votes, thus becoming a member of parliament again.

After a press conference of ANO at the end of October 2023, chairman Babiš identified Dostálová as a potential leader of the ANO movement's candidate for the 2024 European Parliament election. She became one from the position of a non-party member in February 2024. During the vote, Dostálová stated that she had applied for ANO because she was allegedly urged to do so by the voters during the campaign. According to the statutes, Dostálová was in the waiting period at the time, but formal acceptance was a matter of days.

ANO won the European Parliament election, with Dostálova herself receiving the highest number of preferential votes of all candidates from all parties and movements, thus becoming an MEP. She later resigned as member of Chamber of Deputies and was replaced in the Chamber of Deputies by Jaromír Dědeček.

== Controversy ==
Dostálova became one of the main people in the case of the CzechTourism agency in December 2018, for which the police also intervened in her ministry. She was supposed to make decisions about spending money for the benefit of selected people outside of the standard official procedure and suspected of subsidy fraud. Dostálova was arrested for abuse of authority of an official with 38 million CZK but denied any mistakes in this case.

Dostálova received award in 2019 as Minister for Regional Development based on a memorandum of cooperation between the Ministry for Regional Development and the Chamber of Commerce. In 2022, it was reported that Dostálova had been under investigation for more than three years on suspicion that she had bought her husband a new car with state money.

== Personal life ==
Dostálová has two children from her marriage.
