= Minister of Mental Health =

Political office

Ministers of Mental Health are specific Government Ministers with a responsibility over mental health.

== History ==
Not many countries have dedicated ministers for mental health, however a minister with another name may be responsible for it.

== By country ==
=== Australia ===
- Minister for Health and Aged Care, whose responsibilities include mental health – Mark Butler MP
- Minister for Mental Health (Australian Capital Territory) – Emma Davidson MLA
- Minister for Mental Health (New South Wales) – Rose Jackson MLC
- Minister for Mental Health and Suicide Prevention, – Selena Uibo MLA
- Minister for Health, Mental Health and Ambulance Services, whose responsibilities include mental health – Shannon Fentiman MP
- Minister for Health and Wellbeing (South Australia), whose responsibilities include mental health – Chris Picton MP
- Minister for Mental Health and Wellbeing (Tasmania) – Jeremy Rockliff MP
- Minister for Mental Health (Victoria) – Ingrid Stitt MP
- Minister for Mental Health (Western Australia) – Amber-Jade Sanderson MLA

=== Canada ===
- Minister of Mental Health and Addictions – Ya'ara Saks MP

=== Ireland ===
- Minister of State for Mental Health and Older People – Mary Butler TD

=== New Zealand ===
- Minister for Mental Health – Matt Doocey MP

=== United Kingdom ===
- Parliamentary Under-Secretary of State for Mental Health and Women's Health Strategy – Maria Caulfield MP
- Minister for Mental Health (Scotland) – Kevin Stewart MSP

== See also ==
- Health minister
