= Libor Michálek =

Czech senator and whistleblower (born 1968)

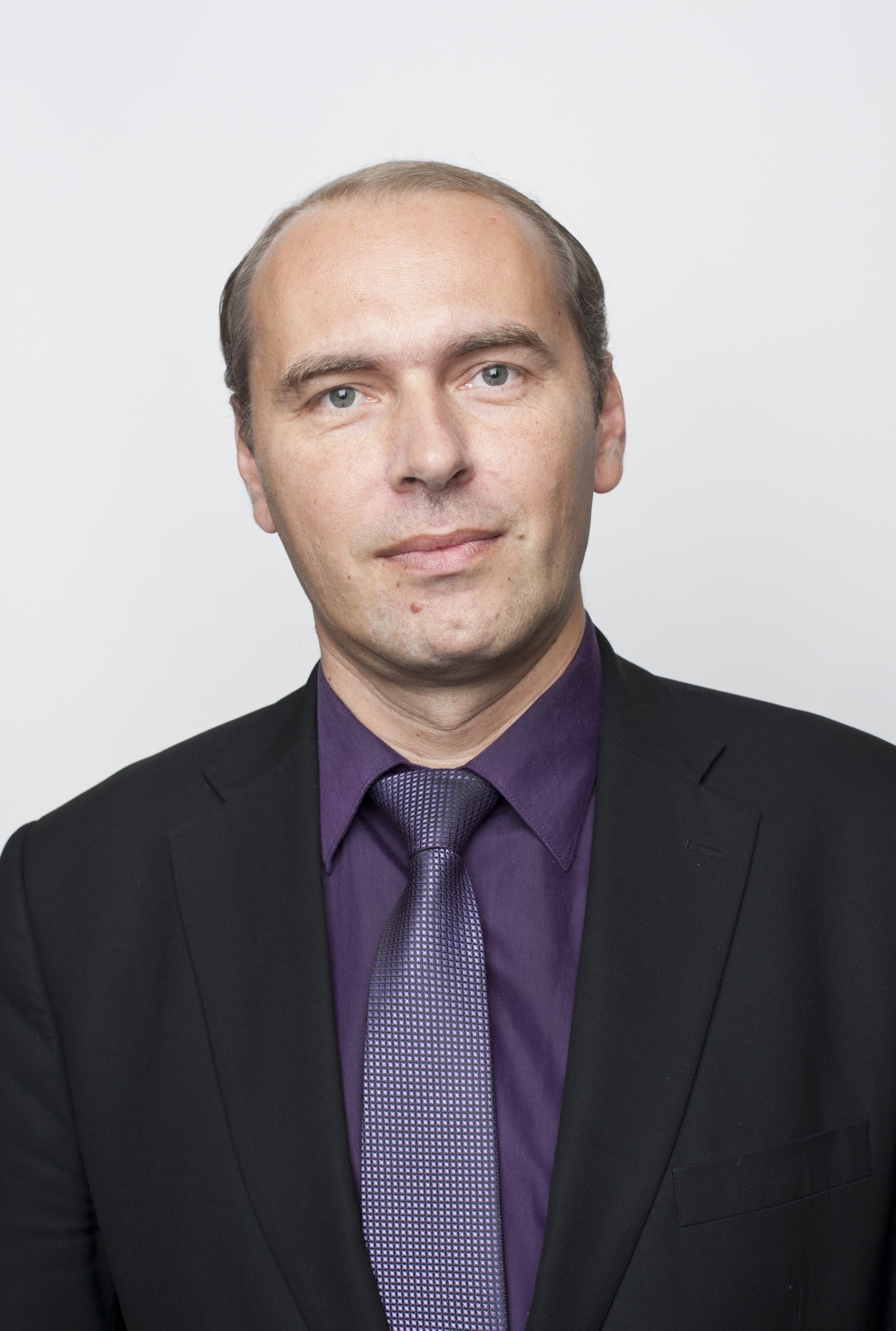

Senator from Prague 2
- In office 20 October 2012 – 13 October 2018
- Preceded by: Daniela Filipiová
- Succeeded by: Marek Hilšer

Personal details
- Born: 14 December 1968 (age 57) Náchod, Czechoslovakia
- Party: Independent
- Other political affiliations: Czech Pirate Party, Green Party, KDU-ČSL
- Children: three
- Education: Palacký University of Olomouc, Masaryk University, Nottingham Trent University (MPA)
- Occupation: Financial analyst

Libor Michálek (born 1968) is a Czech financial analyst, politician, and whistleblower. He led successful corruption cases against the Czech National Property Fund and the Czech Ministry of the Environment, as a former employee of both. Michálek was the member of the Czech Senate for Prague 2 from 2012 to 2018, representing the Pirate Party. He was the first Pirate Party candidate to be elected to national office. Michálek lost subsequent bids for re-election.

== Early life and career ==
Libor Michálek was born in Náchod on 14 December 1968. He graduated from high school in Přerov in 1987, and from Palacký University of Olomouc in 1992. He later studied in Masaryk University's management program, and received his Master of Public Administration (MPA) from Nottingham Trent University's executive program in 2010.

After college, he worked as a UNIX programmer, business school teacher, and portfolio manager at an investment company. Michálek was a broker at the National Property Fund from 1994 to 1996, when he was fired after exposing a tunneling embezzlement scheme. The resulting court case found that he was improperly dismissed. He was later involved in compensating victims of financial crime. Michálek served as a capital market supervisor at the Czech Ministry of Finance from 1997 to 1998, a director at the Czech Securities Commission from 1998 to 2006, a director at the Czech National Bank from 2006 to 2007, a senior consultant at the World Bank in 2007, and the chief financial market inspector at the Czech National Bank from 2008 to 2010.

== Drobil case ==
In August 2010, Michálek became the director of the Czech State Environmental Fund. On 13 December 2010, he filed a criminal complaint of corruption against the Environment Ministry in its tender for the reconstruction of a Prague water treatment plant. He claimed the project was overpriced by 3,000,000,000 Kč. Based on a secretly audiotaped conversation, Michálek also alleged that Martin Knetig, an advisor to environmental minister Pavel Drobil, asked him to manipulate the tender to fund his party (the Civic Democrats) and Drobil's political career. Michálek recorded his subsequent conversation with Drobil, who allegedly offered his deputy position for the destruction of the tapes. Upon the story's publication, Drobil fired Michálek and Knetig, denied any wrongdoing, and resigned a day later.

Prime Minister Petr Nečas defended Drobil, and called Michálek untrustworthy despite his public reputation as a whistleblower. Having vowed to fight corruption, losing a minister to corruption charges was damaging for the Civic Democrats. The Drobil incident was the first of several high-profile resignations. On 21 December 2010, Czech Police Chief Oldrich Martinu resigned after Interior Minister Radek John's month-long call for his ouster, in part due to mishandling of the Drobil case. Michálek returned to the State Environmental Fund as a financial analyst in 2011. In September 2012, the Drobil case was suspended indefinitely due to a lack of evidence. From February 2013, the case against Knetig was also suspended due to insufficient evidence.

In 2011, the Czech Endowment Fund Against Corruption awarded Michálek first prize for his whistleblowing role in the Environment Ministry corruption scandal. The Charter 77 Foundation also awarded Michálek the 2011 František Kriegel Prize for "brave, consistent and uncompromising fight against corruption in government".

== Senate ==
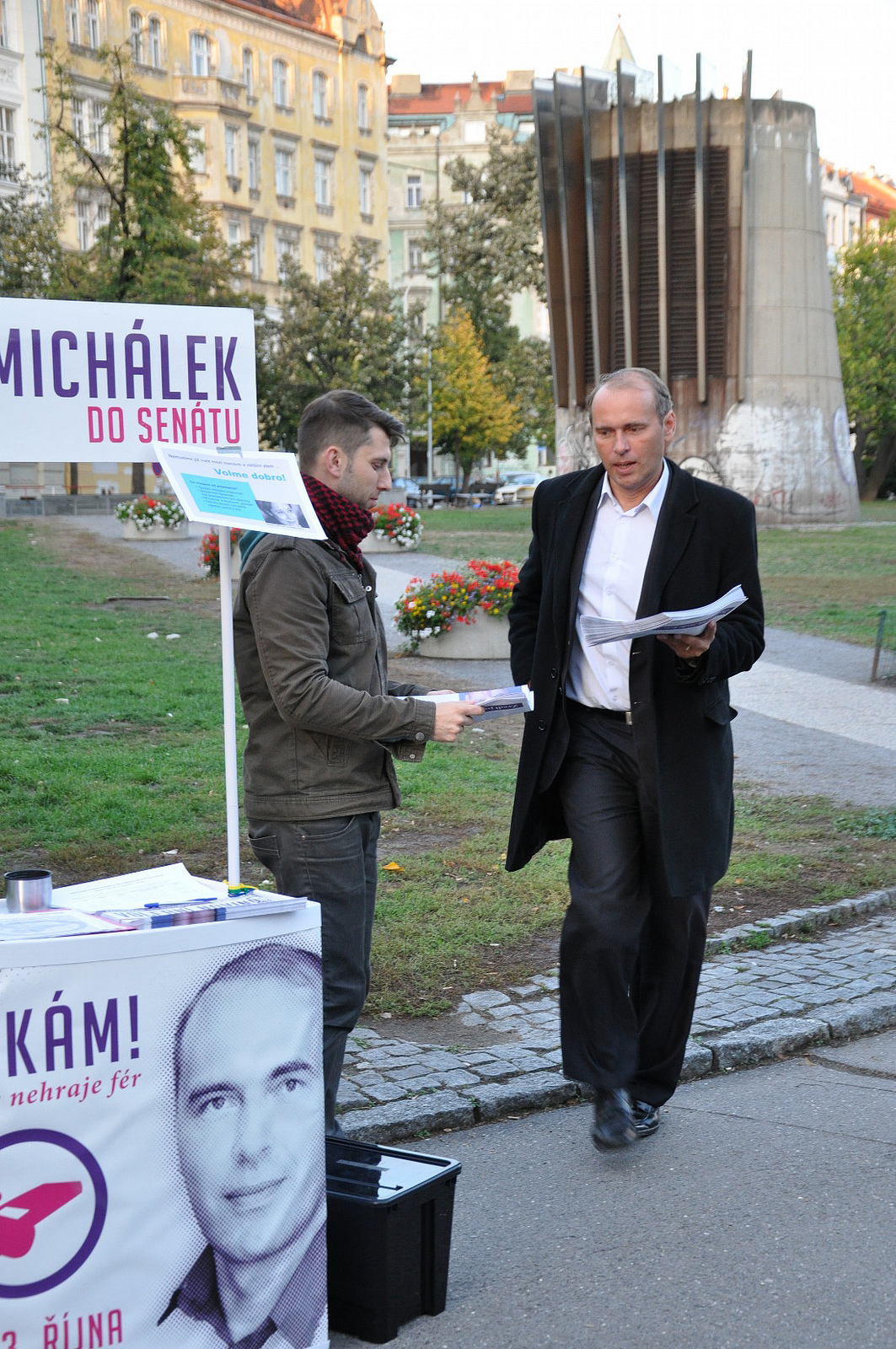
Michálek near his Senate 2012 campaign booth

At the end of July 2012, Libor Michálek accepted a nomination from the Czech Pirate, Green, and Christian Democrat parties to run for the Czech Senate in district 26. He was primarily affiliated with the Pirate Party due to its transparency and accountability platforms. His 12-point campaign platform prioritized direct democracy, fair political party competition, and anti-corruption oversight efforts alongside social welfare reforms. In the October 2012 elections, he won 24.3 percent of the first round vote and 74.4 percent of the first-past-the-post runoff, winning a seat in the Czech Senate. Another candidate, Karel Berka, challenged the decision, but the Czech Supreme Administrative Court ruled the claims unfounded. Michálek was the first Pirate Party candidate to be elected to national office. His senatorial term was 2012–2018.

Czech President Miloš Zeman publicly considered Michálek to lead the Supreme Audit Office. In 2013, Michálek authored the first bill designed to protect whistleblowers, which was overwhelmingly rejected on the floor of the Senate.

Michálek stood unsuccessfully for re-election in the 2018 Senate elections, winning 20 percent of the vote in the second round against Marek Hilšer's 80 percent. Michálek, newly affiliated with the Vize pro Česko party, stood again in 2019 for the Prague 9 seat, placing sixth in the first round. He began collecting signatures to run in the 2023 Czech presidential election, but ultimately did not submit his candidacy.

== Personal life ==
Michálek is married and has three children. He is a devout evangelical Christian.
