= Antonín Prachař =

Czech politician (born 1962)

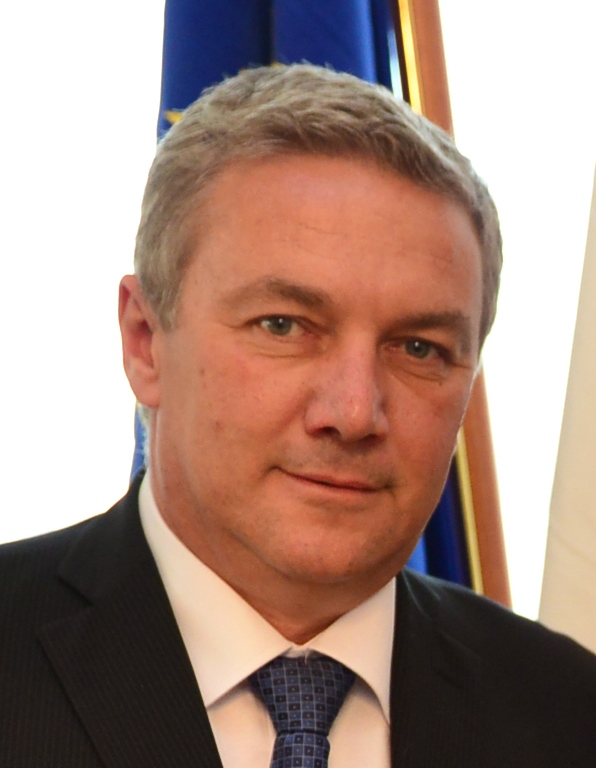

Minister of Transport
- In office 29 January 2014 – 13 November 2014
- Prime Minister: Bohuslav Sobotka
- Preceded by: Zdeněk Žák
- Succeeded by: Dan Ťok

Personal details
- Born: 14 December 1962 (age 63) Uherské Hradiště, Czechoslovakia
- Party: ANO 2011 (2012–2016)
- Education: University of Žilina

Antonín Prachař (born 14 December 1962 in Uherské Hradiště, Czech Republic) is a Czech politician and transport expert, formerly vice president of the Czech Association of Road Transport Operators (ČESMAD BOHEMIA). He was the Czech Minister of Transport in the government of Bohuslav Sobotka from January to November 2014.
