= Dana Jurásková =

Czech politician

13th Minister of Health
- In office 8 May 2009 – 13 July 2010
- Prime Minister: Jan Fischer
- Preceded by: Daniela Filipiová
- Succeeded by: Leoš Heger

Personal details
- Born: 21 September 1961 (age 65) Uherské Hradiště, Czechoslovakia
- Party: ODS
- Education: Charles University
- Occupation: politician, pedagogue

Dana Jurásková (born 21 September 1961) is a Czech politician. She was the Minister of Health in the caretaker government of Jan Fischer.

Government offices
Preceded by Daniela Filipiová	Minister of Health of the Czech Republic; 2009–2010	Succeeded by Leoš Heger
