= Jana Michailidu =

Czech politician

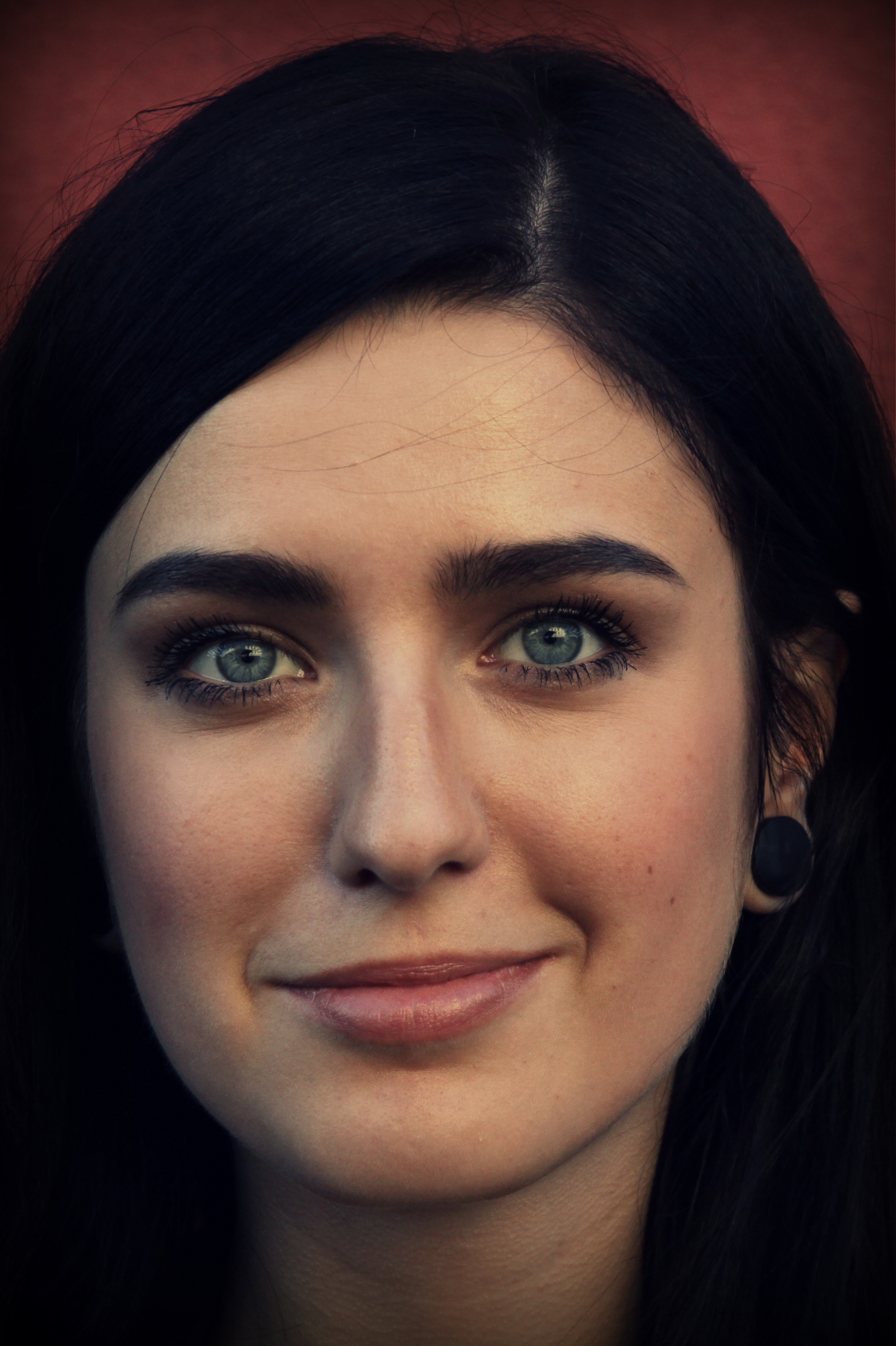

Deputy Chair of the Czech Pirate Party
- In office 18 January 2014 – 2 August 2014

Personal details
- Born: 18 October 1990 (age 35) Karviná, Czechoslovakia (now the Czech Republic)
- Party: Czech Pirate Party (2012–2024)
- Education: University of Chemistry and Technology, Prague

Jana Michailidu (born 18 October 1990) is a Czech politician of Greek origin. From June to August 2014 she was acting chairwoman of the Czech Pirate Party. She was a member of the party's Republic Committee.

In January 2022 she ran for the leadership of the Czech Pirate Party, finishing fourth.

== Early life ==
Jana Michailidu was born in Karviná, in the north-east of the present-day Czech Republic. She is descended from Greeks who emigrated to Czechoslovakia after the fall of the Democratic Army of Greece in the Greek Civil War. She studied drug biotechnology at the University of Chemistry and Technology in Prague.

== Political career ==
Michailidu ran unsuccessfully for the Czech Pirate Party in the 2013 Czech legislative election. In 2014, she participated in the leadership of the Young Pirates of Europe. Michailidu described herself as a "democratic communist".

Following the November 2024 leadership election, Michailidu announced her departure from the party, citing political differences with the new leadership.
