= Lubomír Metnar =

Czech politician (born 1967)

Lubomír Metnar MP
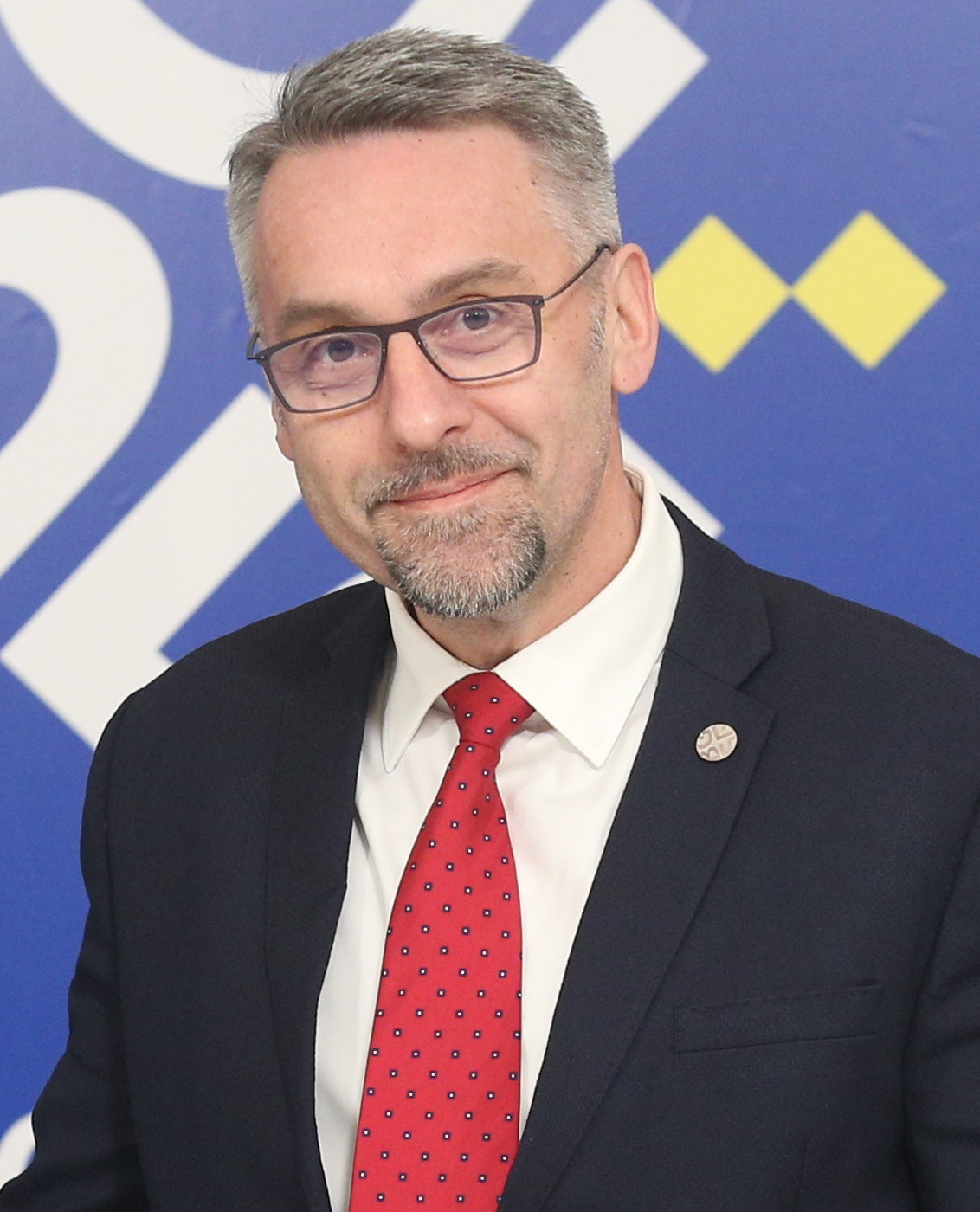
- Metnar in 2018

Minister of the Interior
- Incumbent
- Assumed office 15 December 2025
- Prime Minister: Andrej Babiš
- Preceded by: Vít Rakušan
- In office 13 December 2017 – 27 June 2018
- Prime Minister: Andrej Babiš
- Preceded by: Milan Chovanec
- Succeeded by: Jan Hamáček

Minister of Defence
- In office 27 June 2018 – 17 December 2021
- Prime Minister: Andrej Babiš
- Preceded by: Karla Šlechtová
- Succeeded by: Jana Černochová

Member of the Chamber of Deputies
- Incumbent
- Assumed office 9 October 2021

Personal details
- Born: 6 October 1967 (age 59) Olomouc, Czechoslovakia
- Party: BOS (2017); Independent (nominated by ANO 2011) (2017–present)
- Education: University of Ostrava
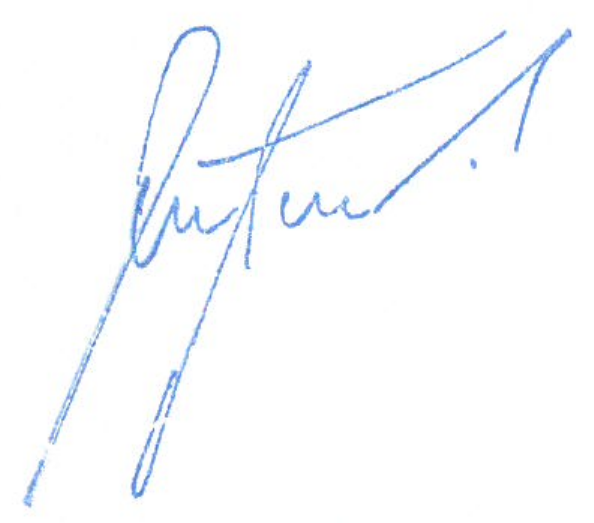
- Signature

Lubomír Metnar (born 6 October 1967) is a Czech politician who has served as Minister of the Interior in the third cabinet of Andrej Babiš since 15 December 2025. He served as the Minister of Defence from 2018 to 2021 and briefly as Minister of the Interior from December 2017 to June 2018. He was elected to the Chamber of Deputies as an independent affiliated with the ANO 2011 movement in 2021.

== Early life and education ==
Metnar joined the service of Public Security on 1 October 1987, before becoming an executive three years later. He worked at the Public Safety Emergency Regiment from 1 March 1988 until 23 February 1989.

Metnar attended Secondary Police School of the Ministry of the Interior in Holešov from 1992 until 1993, where he was obliged to supplement the education obtained at the civilian school, with a professional security education at the departmental school of the Ministry of the Interior.

Metnar graduated from University of Ostrava, receiving the M.Sc. whilst majoring in economics. He served as deputy chairman of the board of VTK Special a.s. until 2015, before becoming member of the supervisory board of the joint-stock company Vítkovice Heavy Machinery until 2016.

== Political career ==
Metnar was a member of the BOS political party, only to have left when some members voted for the Czech Republic to leave NATO and the European Union. He stated: "It is not true that I would ever hold an opinion about withdrawing from these structures."

At the end of November 2017, Metnar announced candidacy as Minister of the Interior of the Czech Republic in the First Cabinet of Andrej Babiš. The same year on 13 December, President Miloš Zeman appointed Metnar to this position.

=== 2018 Czech presidential election ===
Before the 2018 Czech presidential election, Metnar denied the information that Zeman automatically advances to the second round. It was ironically delivered by Jindřich Šídlo in the talk show Šťastné Pondělí, prior to being distributed in a printed form in a different wording by an unknown person to mailboxes in Ostrava. However, Metnar did not refute the false information about the opponent in the second round, Jiří Drahoš, as they had a different nature of seriousness.

At the end of June 2018, Babiš appointed Metnar to his second cabinet, this time as Minister of Defense of the Czech Republic. The latter also resigned as Minister of the Interior of the Czech Republic.

On 29 September 2020, together with other members of the cabinet, Metnar called on Armenia and Azerbaijan to stop the Nagorno-Karabakh conflict.

=== 2021 Czech parliamentary election ===
In the 2021 Czech parliamentary election, Metnar ran as a non-party candidate in the second place as ANO 2011 candidate in the Moravian-Silesian Region. He received 6,481 preferential votes and thus became an MP.

== Controversy ==
In 2018, Czech Television accused Metnar of plagiarism his diploma work, to which he later apologised. Mikuláš Bek, rector of Masaryk University pointed out, that the unintentional omission of a citation or source is also considered plagiarism.
