= Petr Arenberger =

Czech dermatologist

Minister of Health
- In office 7 April 2021 – 26 May 2021
- Prime Minister: Andrej Babiš
- Preceded by: Jan Blatný
- Succeeded by: Adam Vojtěch

Personal details
- Born: 4 December 1958 (age 67) Prague, Czechoslovakia (now Czech Republic)
- Party: Communist Party of Czechoslovakia (before 1989); Independent (nominated by ANO 2011) (2021)
- Spouse: Monika Arenbergerová
- Children: 2
- Education: Charles University in Prague
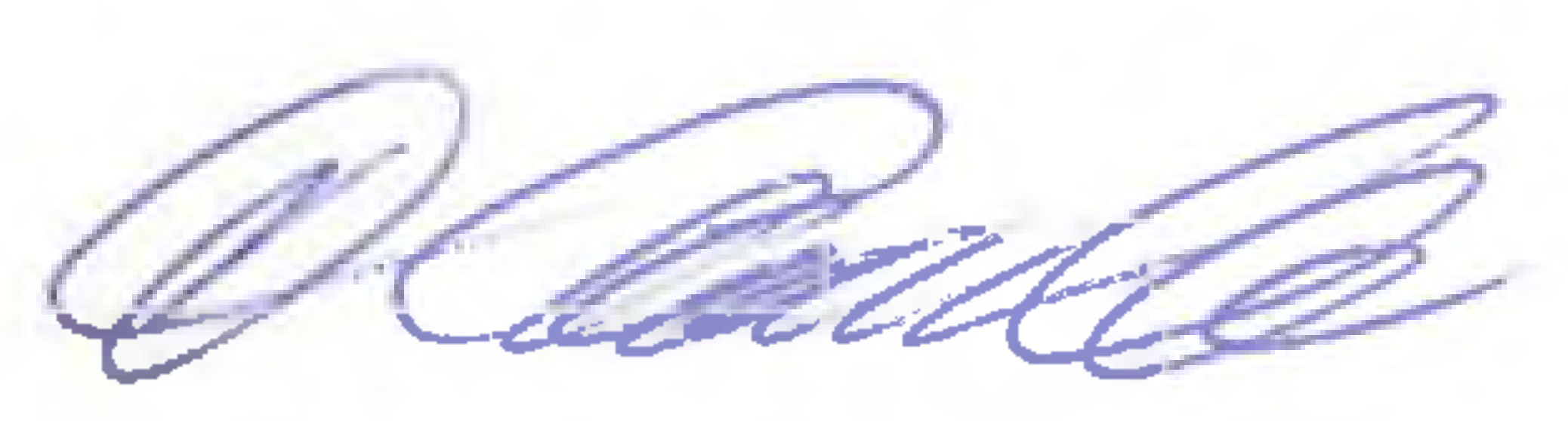
- Signature

Petr Arenberger (born 4 December 1958 in Prague) is a Czech dermatologist, university teacher, and politician. From April to May 2021, he was the Minister of Health of the Czech Republic in the second government of Andrej Babiš. He was criticised for dissolving the COVID expert group that had accused the government of mismanagement of the crisis.
