= Lukáš Wagenknecht =

Czech economist and auditor

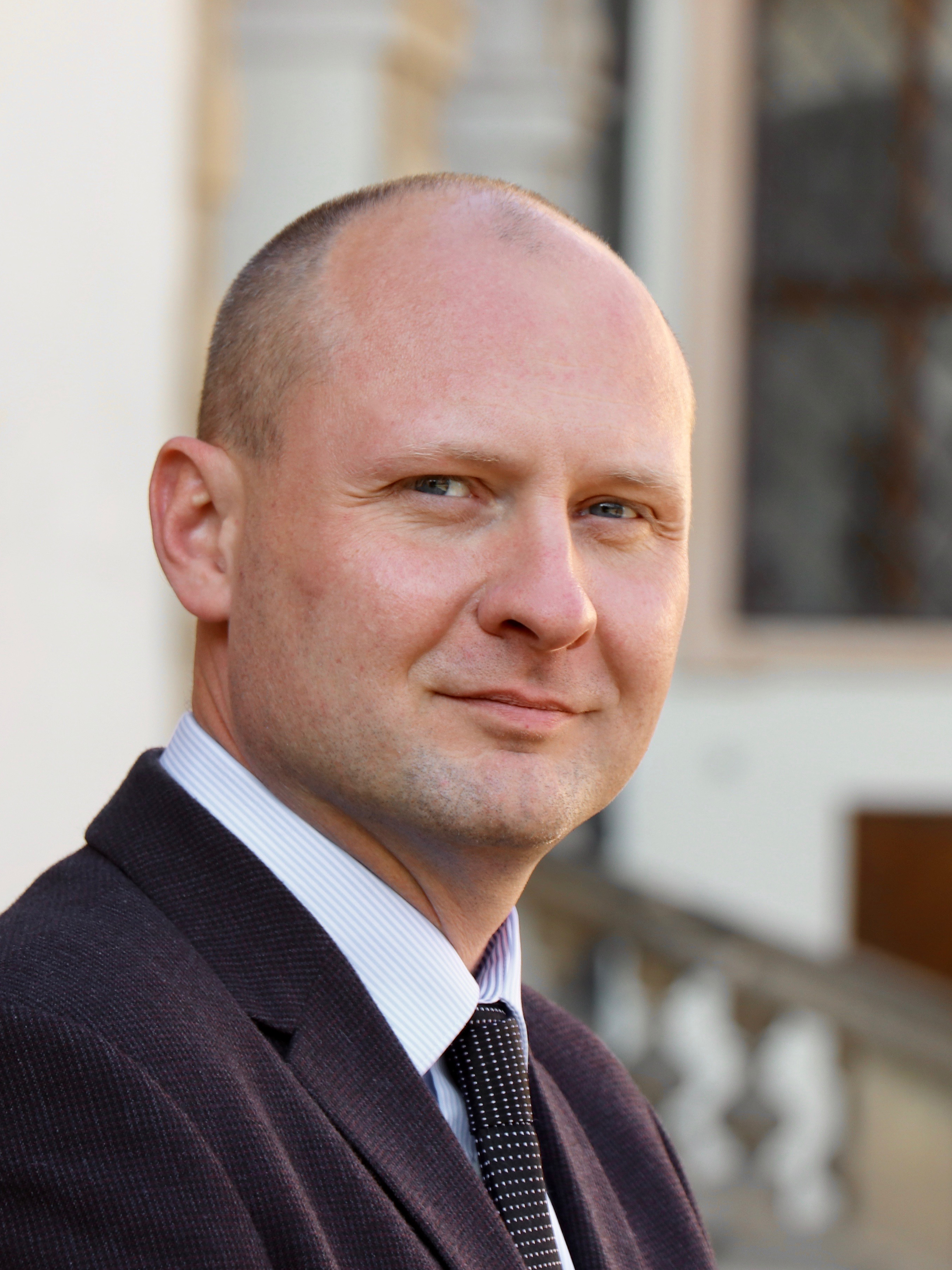
- Wagenknecht in 2019

Leader of JSME TEAM
- Incumbent
- Assumed office 12 March 2026
- Preceded by: Marek Hilšer

Senator from Prague 8
- In office 13 October 2018 – 13 October 2024
- Preceded by: Daniela Filipiová
- Succeeded by: Vladimíra Ludková

Personal details
- Born: 24 September 1978 (age 48) Pardubice, Czechoslovakia
- Party: Czech Pirate Party (2019–2025); JSME TEAM (2026–present)
- Education: University of Pardubice
- Occupation: Economist, auditor
- Website: lukaswagenknecht.cz

Lukáš Wagenknecht (born 24 September 1978) is a Czech economist, auditor and politician who served as a Senator of the Czech Republic representing Prague 8 district from October 2018 to October 2024. He was a member of the Czech Pirate Party from 2019 to 2025. In 2026 he became the leader of JSME TEAM. Wagenknecht also co-founded the auditing organization and think tank Good Governance and was a contributor to Neovlivní.cz, a publisher of investigative journalism.

== Political beginnings ==
Lukáš Wagenknecht was born on 24 September 1978 in Pardubice, Czechoslovakia (now northern-central Czech Republic). He studied at the Faculty of Economics and Administration of the University of Pardubice from 1998 to 2003 and subsequently started his professional career as an internal auditor at the Ministry of the Interior, in 2003.

From February 2014 to June 2015, Wagenknecht served as the first Deputy Minister of Finance of the Czech Republic in the field of financial management and audit. In 2015, he received the Prize for Courage for whistleblowing from the Anticorruption Endowment foundation. Wagenknecht co-founded the auditing organization and think tank Good Governance and since January 2018, he is a contributor to Neovlivní.cz, a publisher of investigative journalism.

== Senator ==
Wagenknecht was elected a Member of the Senate of the Czech Republic for the Czech Pirate Party in the 2018 election. In October 2019, Wagenknecht "launched legal action at the European Court of Justice after the European Council failed to respond to his concerns about the alleged conflict of interest" of the acting Prime Minister of the Czech Republic, Andrej Babiš. Wagenknecht also investigated the alleged subsidy fraud of Prime Minister Babiš.
