= Jan Blatný =

Czech hematologist, teacher, politician and former Minister of Health

Minister of Health
- In office 29 October 2020 – 7 April 2021
- Prime Minister: Andrej Babiš
- Preceded by: Roman Prymula
- Succeeded by: Petr Arenberger

Personal details
- Born: 24 March 1970 (age 56) Prostějov, Czechoslovakia
- Party: Independent (nominated by ANO)
- Domestic partner: Dana Blatná
- Children: 3
- Education: Masaryk University

Jan Blatný (born 24 March 1970) is a Czech medical doctor, teacher and politician. On 29 October 2020 he was named as Minister of Health of the Czech Republic by Prime Minister Andrej Babiš following the resignation of Roman Prymula. On 7 April 2021 he was replaced by Petr Arenberger.
