= Alena Palečková =

Czech politician and zoologist

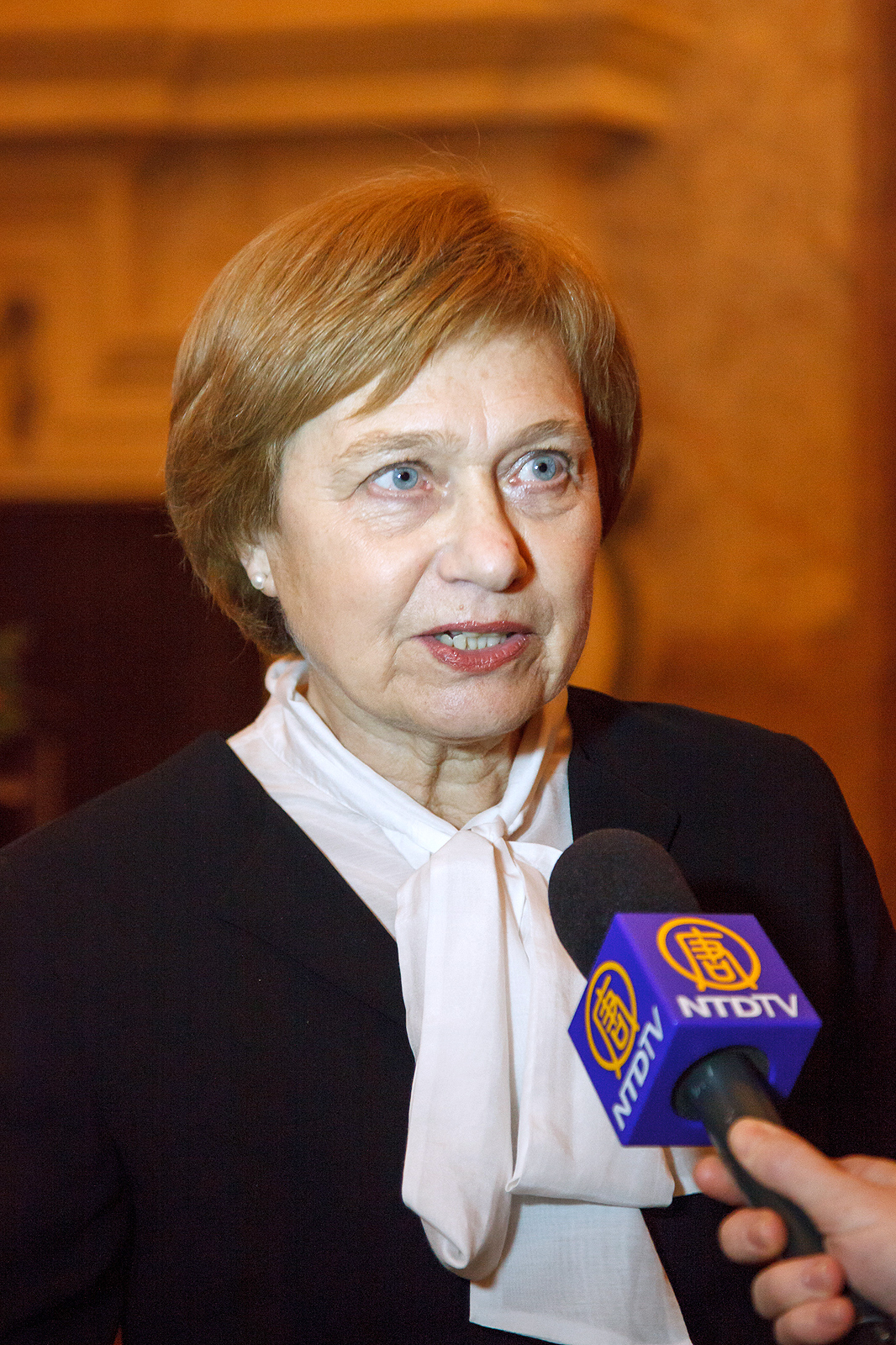

Vice President of the Senate
- In office 24 November 2010 – 28 October 2012

Senator from Prague 8
- In office 23 November 1996 – 28 October 2012
- Preceded by: Office established
- Succeeded by: Daniela Filipiová

Personal details
- Born: 28 April 1947 (age 79) Prague, Czechoslovakia
- Party: ODS
- Education: Charles University
- Occupation: politician, zoologist

Alena Palečková (born 28 April 1947) is a Czech politician and zoologist. A member of the Civic Democratic Party (ODS), Palečková served as Senator for Prague 8 from the establishment of the role in 1996 until 2012, when she did not run for reelection and was replaced by Daniela Filipiová. During her last two years in the senate, she served as Vice-President. Palečková was a Member of the European Parliament between 1 May and 19 July 2004, before the country's first election.
