= Miloslav Ludvík =

Minister of Health of the Czech Republic

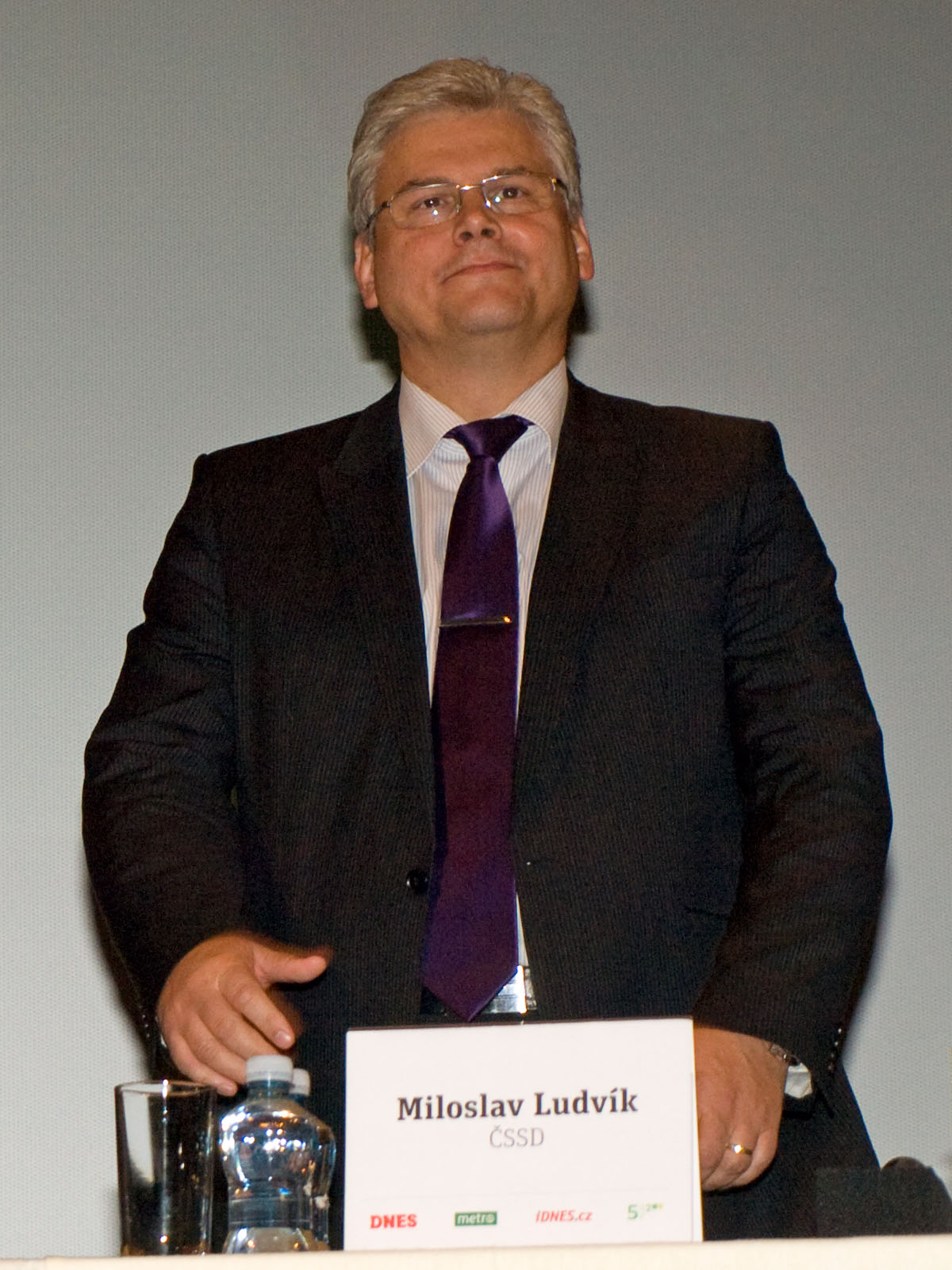

Minister of Health
- In office 1 December 2016 – 13 December 2017
- Prime Minister: Bohuslav Sobotka
- Preceded by: Svatopluk Němeček
- Succeeded by: Adam Vojtěch

Personal details
- Born: 5 September 1963 (age 63) Prague, Czechoslovakia
- Party: ČSSD
- Education: Charles University

Miloslav Ludvík (born 5 September 1963) is a Czech politician and former Motol University Hospital director who served as Minister of Health from 2016 to 2017. He is a graduate of the Faculty of Business of the University of Economics, Prague.

== Bribery affair ==
On 25 February 2025, Czech Health Minister Vlastimil Válek immediately dismissed Miloslav Ludvík, the head of Prague’s Motol Hospital, following a police raid that detained over a dozen people, including Ludvík himself.

The hospital, the largest in the Czech Republic and a key institution serving more than a million patients annually, has been under his leadership since 2000, with the exception of a short period when he served as health minister. Ludvík is now among 16 individuals charged with bribery and fraud linked to construction contracts valued at over CZK 4 billion, underscoring a serious crackdown on corruption in the country’s healthcare system.
