= Roman Prymula =

Czech epidemiologist and politician (born 1964)

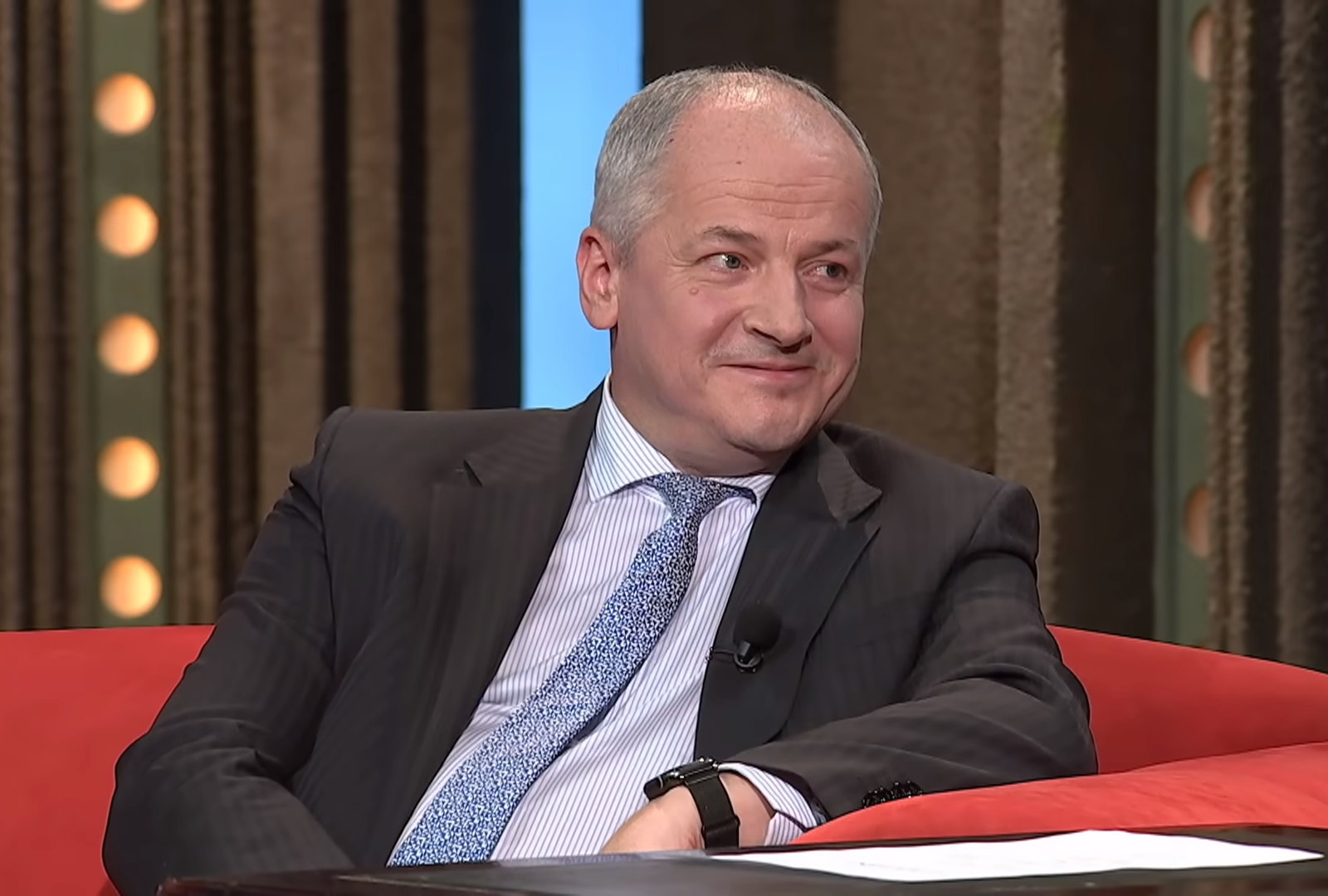

Minister of Health
- In office 21 September 2020 – 29 October 2020
- Prime Minister: Andrej Babiš
- Preceded by: Adam Vojtěch
- Succeeded by: Jan Blatný

Personal details
- Born: 4 February 1964 (age 62) Pardubice, Czechoslovakia
- Party: Independent (nominated by ANO 2011)
- Children: 2
- Chess career
- Country: Czech Republic
- Title: FIDE Master (2004)
- Peak rating: 2315 (July 2003)

Roman Prymula (born 4 February 1964) is a Czech medical doctor, professor of epidemiology and retired army colonel.

During the early stages of the COVID-19 pandemic in the Czech Republic, he served as the head of the Czech government's Central Crisis Board (Czech: ústřední krizový štáb) and then as a government agent for science and research. On 21 September 2020 he was named as Minister of Health of the Czech Republic by Prime Minister Andrej Babiš following the resignation of Adam Vojtěch.

On 21 October 2020, the tabloid Blesk published photographs of Prymula and Jaroslav Faltýnek leaving a restaurant late at night in apparent breach of COVID-19 regulations, under which all restaurants were supposed to be closed. He was replaced by Jan Blatný on 29 October.
