= Svatopluk Němeček =

Czech politician (born 1972)

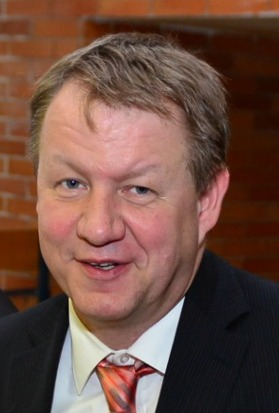

18th Minister of Health of the Czech Republic
- In office 29 January 2014 – 30 November 2016
- Prime Minister: Bohuslav Sobotka
- Preceded by: Martin Holcát
- Succeeded by: Miloslav Ludvík

Personal details
- Born: 23 February 1972 (age 54) Bohumín, Czechoslovakia
- Party: ČSSD
- Domestic partner: Zdenka Crkvenjaš
- Education: Palacký University in Olomouc; BIBS Brno

Svatopluk Němeček (born 23 February 1972) is a Czech politician and doctor. From 2014 to 2016 he served as the Czech Minister of Health in the government of Bohuslav Sobotka. From 2005 until 2014 he was the director of the Faculty Hospital in Ostrava, and from 2012 to 2014 he was a regional council-member of the Moravian-Silesian Region.
