= Karla Šlechtová =

Czech politician and economist

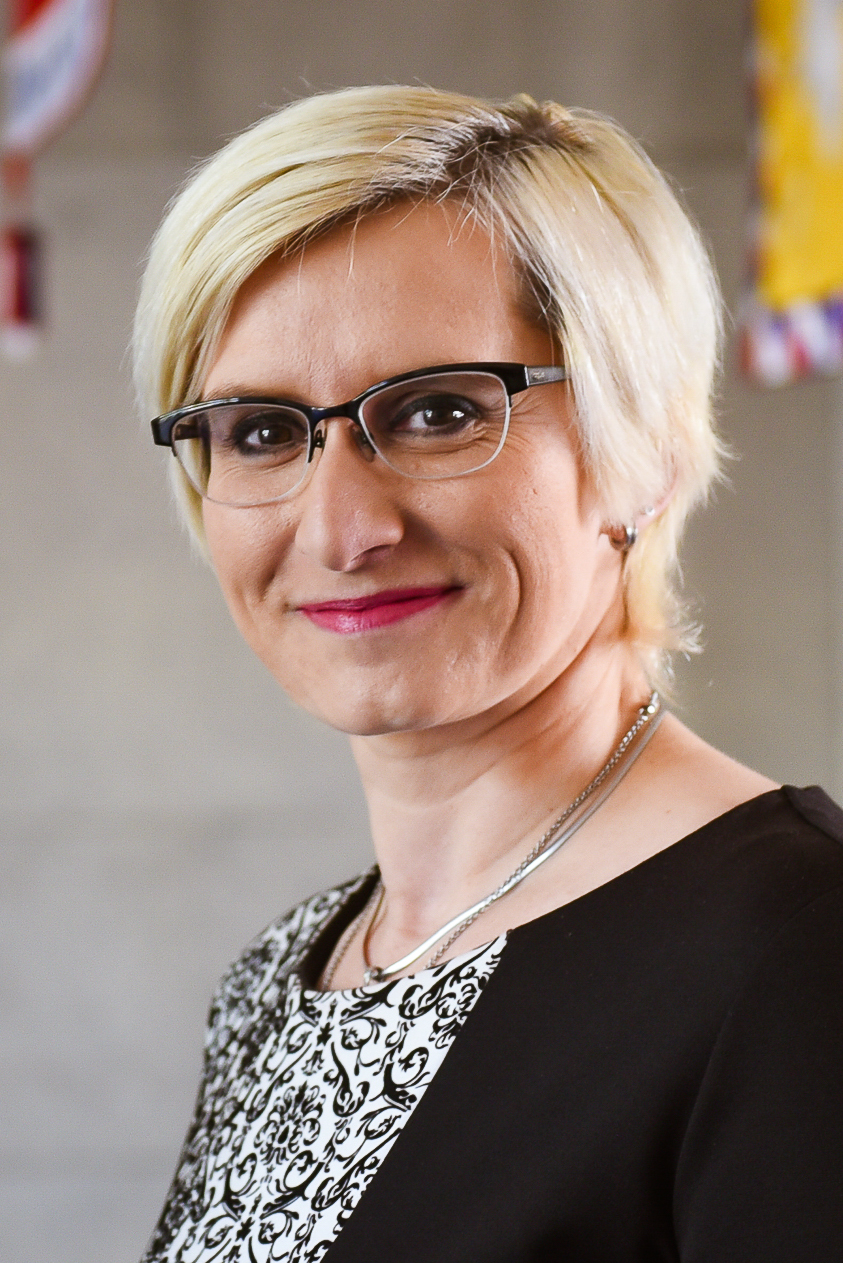

Minister of Defence
- In office 13 December 2017 – 27 June 2018
- Prime Minister: Andrej Babiš
- Preceded by: Martin Stropnický
- Succeeded by: Lubomír Metnar

Minister of Regional Development
- In office 8 October 2014 – 13 December 2017
- Prime Minister: Bohuslav Sobotka
- Preceded by: Věra Jourová
- Succeeded by: Klára Dostálová

Member of the Chamber of Deputies
- In office 21 October 2017 – 21 October 2021

Personal details
- Born: 22 May 1977 (age 49) Karlovy Vary, Czechoslovakia
- Party: Non-partisan, nominated by ANO 2011
- Education: University of West Bohemia

Karla Šlechtová (born 22 May 1977) is a Czech politician and economist who served as Minister of Defence from December 2017 to June 2018. Previously, she also served as Minister of Regional Development from 2014 to 2017. Šlechtová has also been Member of the Chamber of Deputies (MP) since October 2017.

In March 2017, she became the first active politician in the Czech Republic to come out as lesbian.
