= Richard Brabec =

Czech politician

Richard Brabec MP
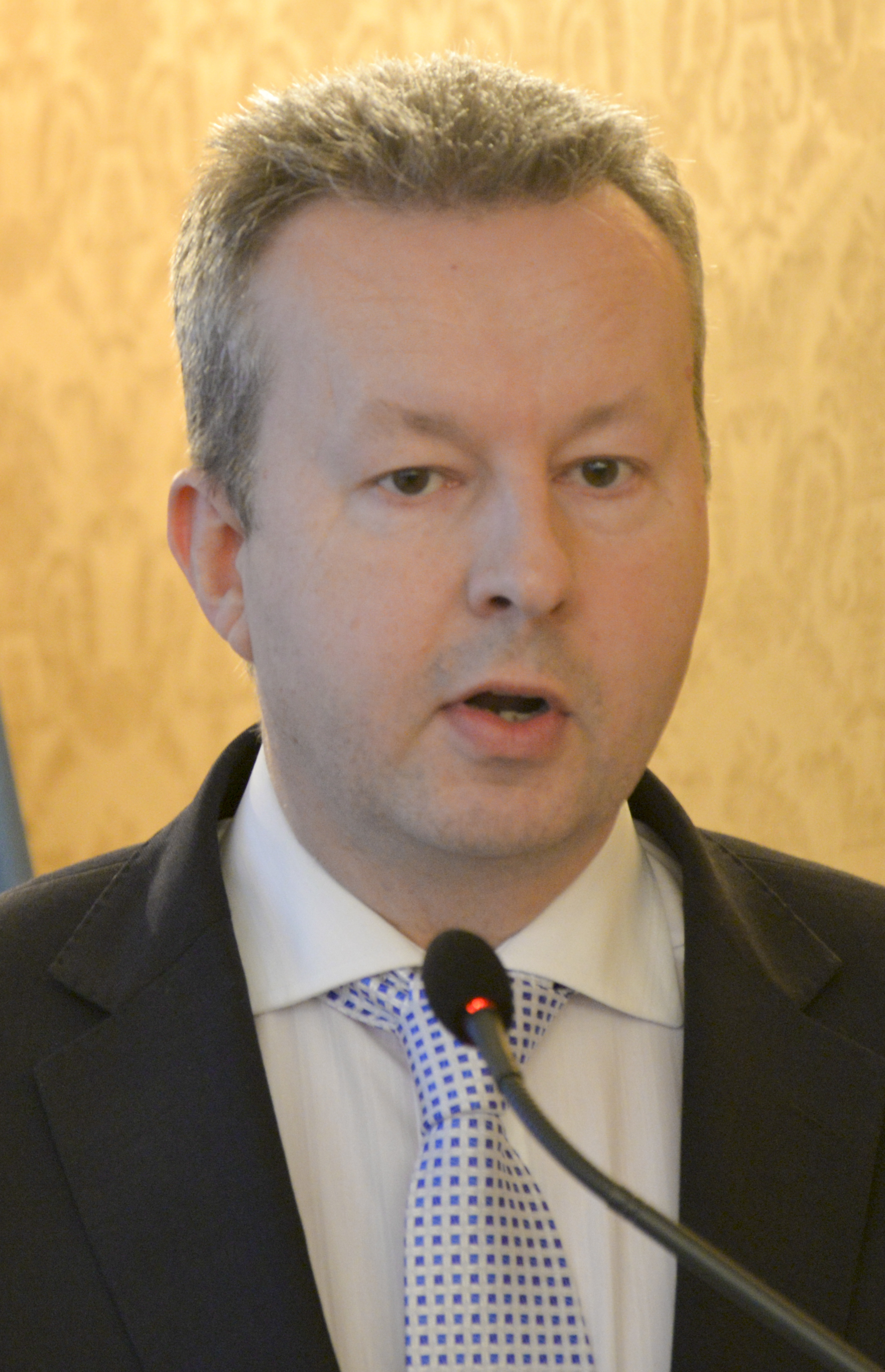

Deputy Prime Minister of the Czech Republic
- In office 13 December 2017 – 30 April 2019
- Prime Minister: Andrej Babiš
- Preceded by: Pavel Bělobrádek
- Succeeded by: Alena Schillerová

Minister of the Environment
- In office 29 January 2014 – 17 December 2021
- Prime Minister: Bohuslav Sobotka; Andrej Babiš
- Preceded by: Tomáš Podivínský
- Succeeded by: Anna Hubáčková

First Deputy Prime Minister of the Czech Republic
- In office 24 May 2017 – 13 December 2017
- Prime Minister: Bohuslav Sobotka
- Preceded by: Andrej Babiš
- Succeeded by: Jan Hamáček (2018)

Member of the Chamber of Deputies
- In office 26 October 2013 – 3 November 2025

Governor of Ústí nad Labem Region
- Incumbent
- Assumed office 15 November 2024
- Preceded by: Jan Schiller

Personal details
- Born: 5 July 1966 (age 60) Kladno, Czechoslovakia (now Czech Republic)
- Party: ODS (1991–1997); ANO 2011 (2012–present)
- Education: Charles University in Prague

Richard Brabec (born 5 July 1966) is a Czech politician, who served as the minister for the Environment from 2014 to 2021, and deputy prime minister of the Czech Republic from 2017 to 2019.

== Career ==
A former manager in the chemical industry for Unipetrol, Spolana Neratovice and Lovochemie, Brabec first entered the Chamber of Deputies in October 2013, elected for ANO 2011.

In January 2014, he became the Czech Minister for the Environment, in the government of Bohuslav Sobotka, and remained in this post under Prime Minister Andrej Babiš until December 2021. From December 2017 to April 2019 he served as the Deputy Prime Minister of the Czech Republic.

On 15 November 2024, Brabec became the Governor of Ústí nad Labem Region.
