= Dan Ťok =

Czech politician and business manager

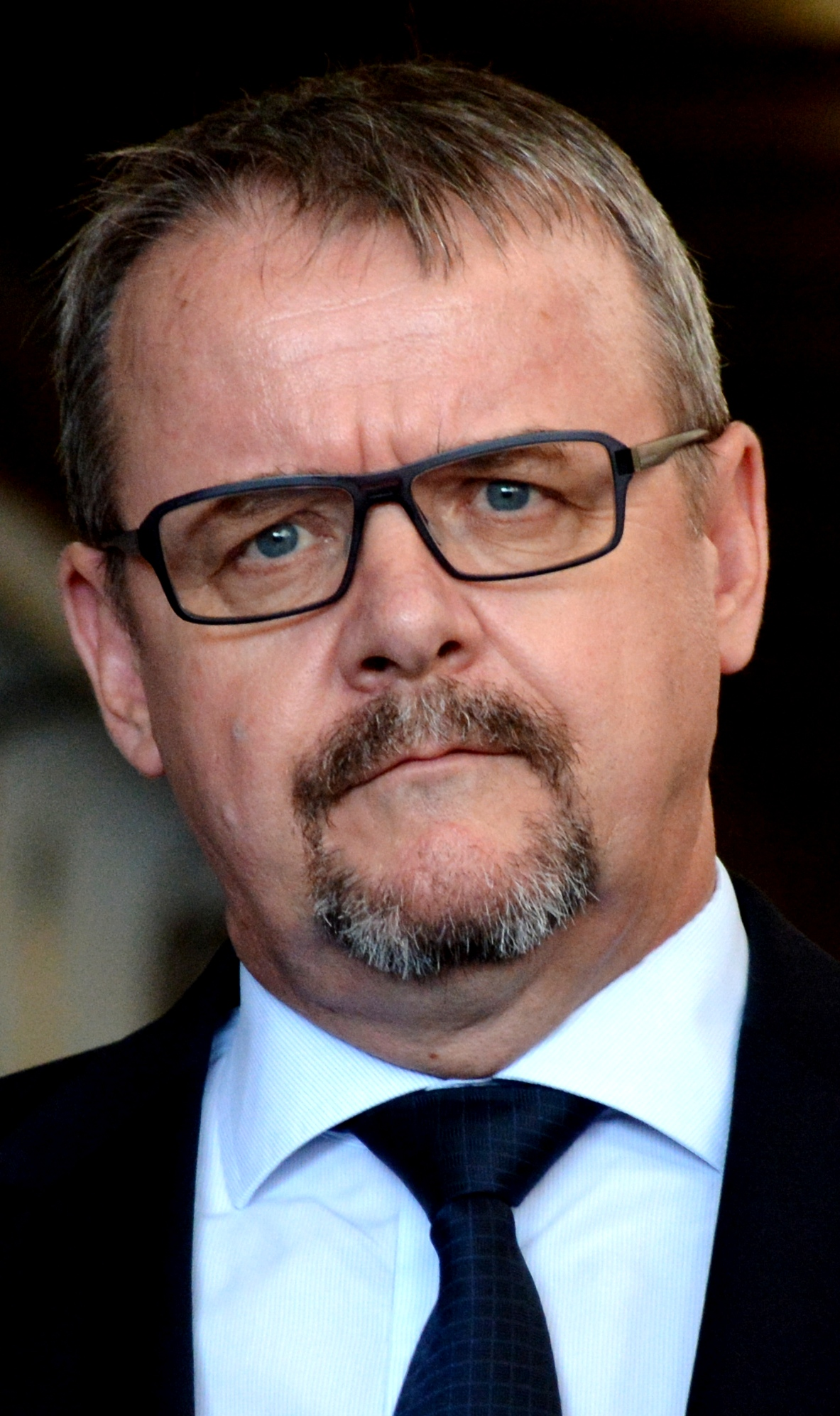

Minister of Transport
- In office 4 December 2014 – 30 April 2019
- Prime Minister: Bohuslav Sobotka; Andrej Babiš
- Preceded by: Antonín Prachař
- Succeeded by: Vladimír Kremlík

Member of the Chamber of Deputies
- In office 21 October 2017 – 15 April 2019

Personal details
- Born: 4 March 1959 (age 67) Uherské Hradiště, Czechoslovakia
- Party: independent (nominated by ANO 2011)
- Education: Brno University of Technology

Dan Ťok (born 4 March 1959) is a Czech politician and business manager who served as minister of transport from 2014 to 2019. He was nominated to the government by ANO 2011.
