= Minister of health =

A health minister is the member of a country's government typically responsible for protecting and promoting public health and providing welfare spending and other social security services.

Some governments have separate ministers for mental health.

== Country-related articles and lists ==
- Albania: Ministry of Health (Albania)
- Argentina: Ministry of Health (Argentina)
- Australia: Minister for Health (Australia)
  - Australian Capital Territory: Minister for Health (Australian Capital Territory)
  - New South Wales: Minister for Health (New South Wales)
  - Northern Territory: Minister for Health (Northern Territory)
  - Queensland: Minister for Health (Queensland)
  - (Victoria (state)) Victoria: Minister for Health (Victoria)
  - Western Australia: Minister for Health (Western Australia)
- Austria: Federal Ministry of Social Affairs, Health, Care and Consumer Protection
- Azerbaijan: Ministry of Healthcare (Azerbaijan)
- (The Bahamas) Bahamas: Ministry of Health (Bahamas)
- Bahrain: Ministry of Health (Bahrain)
- Bangladesh: Ministry of Health and Family Welfare (Bangladesh)
- Barbados: Ministry of Health and Wellness (Barbados)
- Belgium: Ministry of Public Health (Belgium)
- Bhutan: Ministry of Health (Bhutan)
- Bolivia: Ministry of Health (Bolivia)
- Botswana: Ministry of Health and Wellness (Botswana)
- Brazil: Ministry of Health (Brazil)
- Brunei: Ministry of Health (Brunei)
- Cambodia: Ministry of Health, Cambodia
- Canada: Minister of Health (Canada)
- Chile: Ministry of Health (Chile)
- People's Republic of China:
  - Mainland China: Minister in charge of the National Health Commission
  - Hong Kong: Secretary for Food and Health
- Colombia: Ministry of Health and Social Protection (Colombia)
- Czech Republic: Ministry of Health (Czech Republic)
- Cyprus: Minister of Health (Cyprus)
- Denmark: Health Minister (Denmark)
- Ecuador: Minister of Health (Ecuador)
- European Union: European Commissioner for Health and Consumer Policy
- France: Minister of Health (France)
- Germany: Federal Minister for Health (Germany)
- Greece: Minister for Health and Social Solidarity (Greece)
- Guyana: Ministry of Health (Guyana)
- Iceland: Ministry of Welfare (Iceland)
- India: Ministry of Health and Family Welfare
  - Department of Health and Family Welfare (Kerala)
- Indonesia: Ministry of Health (Indonesia)
- Iran: Ministry of Health and Medical Education
- Iraq: Minister of Health (Iraq)
- (Republic of Ireland) Ireland: Minister for Health (Ireland)
- Israel: Ministry of Health (Israel)
- Italy: Minister of Health (Italy)
- Japan: Minister of Health, Labour and Welfare (Japan)
- Lithuania: Ministry of Health (Lithuania)
- Malaysia: Minister of Health (Malaysia)
- Mexico: Secretary of Health (Mexico)
- Moldova: Ministry of Health (Moldova)
- Myanmar: Ministry of Health and Sports (Myanmar)
- Nepal: Minister of Health and Population (Nepal)
- Netherlands: Minister of Health, Welfare and Sport
- New Zealand: Minister of Health (New Zealand)
- Nigeria: Federal Ministry of Health (Nigeria)
- North Macedonia: Ministry of Health (North Macedonia)
- Pakistan: Ministry of National Health Services Regulation and Coordination
- Peru: Ministry of Health (Peru)
- Philippines: Secretary of Health or DOH Secretary
- Poland: Ministry of Health (Poland)
- Portugal: Ministry of Health (Portugal)
- Russia: Ministry of Health (Russia)
- Singapore: Ministry of Health (Singapore)
- South Africa: Minister of Health (South Africa)
- South Korea: Ministry of Health and Welfare (South Korea)
- Soviet Union: Ministry of Health (Soviet Union)
- Spain: Ministry of Health (Spain)
- Republic of China (Taiwan): Ministry of Health and Welfare (Republic of China)
- Thailand: Ministry of Public Health (Thailand)
- Turkey: Ministry of Health (Turkey)
- Uganda: Uganda Ministry of Health
- Ukraine: Ministry of Health (Ukraine)
- United Kingdom:
  - England: Secretary of State for Health and Social Care
  - Northern Ireland (1922–1972): Minister of Health and Local Government
  - Scotland: Cabinet Secretary for Health and Care
  - Wales: Cabinet Minister for Health and Care
- Tanzania: Ministry of Health and Social Welfare, Tanzania
- Uruguay: Uruguayan Minister of Health
- United States: United States Secretary of Health and Human Services, United States Deputy Secretary of Health and Human Services
- Venezuela: Ministry of Health (Venezuela)
- Vietnam: Ministry of Health (Vietnam)

== See also ==
- Minister of Mental Health
- Ministry of Health (disambiguation)
- List of health departments and ministries
