= List of presidents of the Chamber of Deputies (Czech Republic) =

This is a complete list of the presidents of the Chamber of Deputies (Czech Republic).

Name		Portrait	Entered office	Left office	Political party
1	Milan Uhde		1 January 1993	6 June 1996	ODS
2	Miloš Zeman		27 June 1996	19 June 1998	ČSSD
3	Václav Klaus		17 July 1998	20 June 2002	ODS
4	Lubomír Zaorálek		11 July 2002	15 June 2006	ČSSD
5	Miloslav Vlček		14 August 2006	30 April 2010	ČSSD
Vacant (1 May – 3 June 2010)
6	Miroslava Němcová		24 June 2010	28 August 2013	ODS
Vacant (28 August – 27 November 2013)
7	Jan Hamáček		27 November 2013	26 October 2017	ČSSD
8	Radek Vondráček		22 November 2017	21 October 2021	ANO
9	Markéta Pekarová Adamová		10 November 2021	8 October 2025	TOP 09
10	Tomio Okamura		5 November 2025	Incumbent	SPD

== See also ==
- President of the Chamber of Deputies of the Parliament of the Czech Republic
