= List of presidents of the Czech Republic =

The Czech Republic is a parliamentary representative democracy in which the president is the head of state and the prime minister is the head of government.

The first president of the Czech Republic was Václav Havel. The current president, Petr Pavel, was sworn into office on 9 March 2023.

Until 2012, presidents were elected by the Chamber of Deputies and the Senate for a term of five years. Since 2013, presidents have been elected by popular vote.

== Czech Republic (1993–) ==
Political parties

Civic Democratic Party (ODS)
Party of Civic Rights (SPO)

Other factions

Independent

No.	Portrait	Name (Birth–Death)	Election	Term of office			Party	Previous office(s)
No.	Portrait	Name (Birth–Death)	Election	Took office	Left office	Time in office	Party	Previous office(s)
Václav Klaus, Milan Uhde (acting, from 1 January to 2 February 1993)
1		Václav Havel (1936–2011)	1993; 1998	2 February 1993	2 February 2003	10 years	Independent	President of Czechoslovakia (1989–1992)
Vladimir Spidla, Lubomír Zaorálek (acting, from 3 February to 7 March 2003)
2		Václav Klaus (born 1941)	2003; 2008	7 March 2003	7 March 2013	10 years	ODS	Prime Minister (1992–1998); President of the Chamber of Deputies (1998–2002)
3		Miloš Zeman (born 1944)	2013; 2018	8 March 2013	8 March 2023	10 years	SPO; Independent	President of the Chamber of Deputies (1996–1998); Prime Minister (1998–2002)
4		Petr Pavel (born 1961)	2023	9 March 2023	Incumbent	3 years, 197 days	Independent	Chief of the General Staff (2012–2015); Chair of the NATO Military Committee (2015–2018)

== Timeline ==
This is a graphical lifespan timeline of the presidents of the Czech Republic. They are listed in order of first assuming office.

The following chart lists presidents by lifespan (living presidents on the green line), with the years outside of their tenure in beige. Presidents with an unknown birth date or death date are shown with only their tenure or their earlier or later life.

The following chart shows presidents by their age (living presidents in green), with the years of their tenure in blue. Presidents with an unknown birth or death date are excluded. The vertical black line at 40 years indicates the minimum age to be president.

== See also ==
- List of rulers of Czechs
- List of presidents of Czechoslovakia
- List of prime ministers of Czechoslovakia
- List of prime ministers of the Czech Socialist Republic
- List of rulers of the Protectorate Bohemia and Moravia
- List of prime ministers of the Czech Republic
- Lists of incumbents
