= 2021 Freedom and Direct Democracy leadership election =

Czech political party leadership election

- 4 December 2021
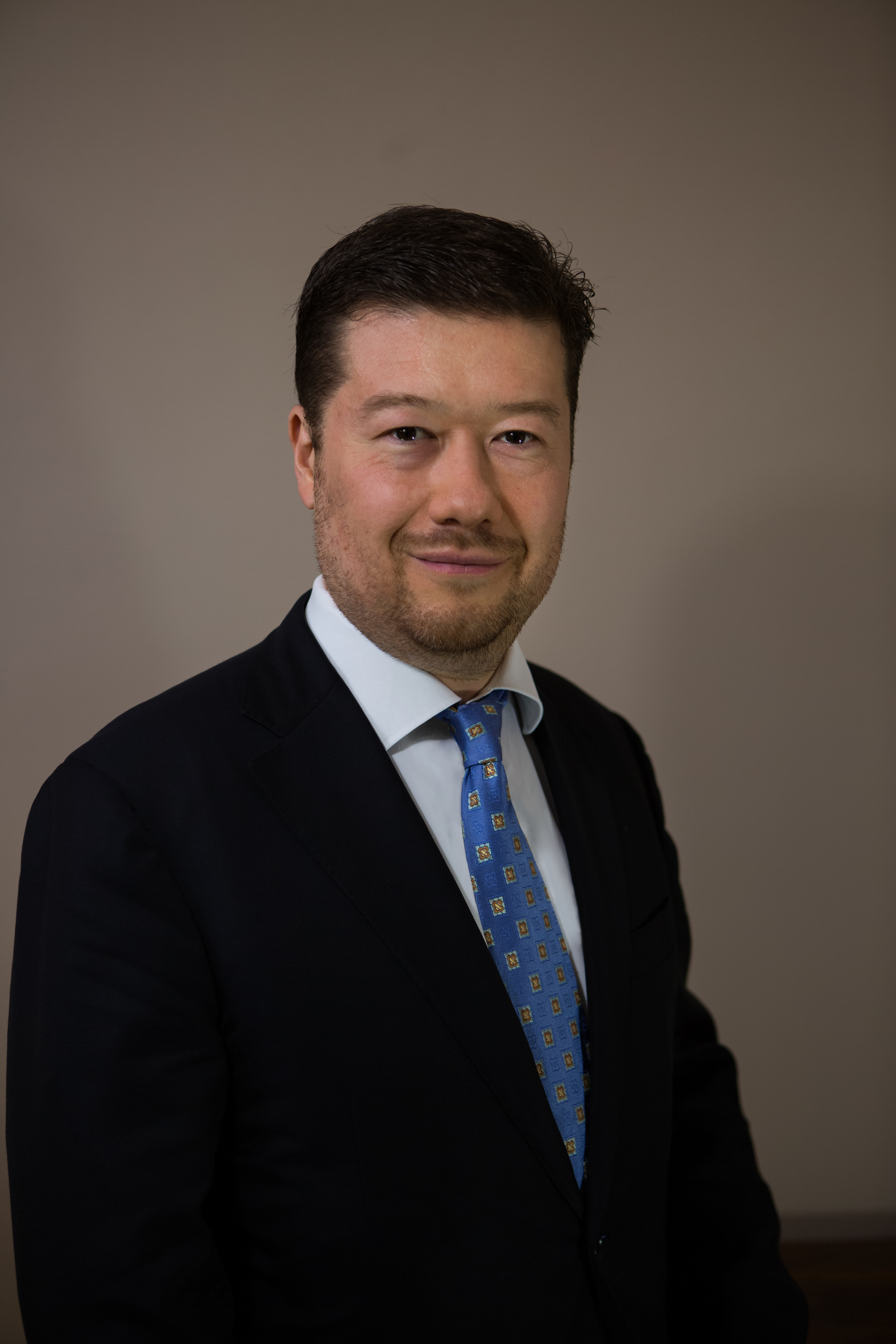
Candidate	Tomio Okamura
Electoral vote	84
Percentage	98.8%
leader of SPD before election
Tomio Okamura
Elected leader of SPD
Tomio Okamura

The Freedom and Direct Democracy (SPD) leadership election of 2021 was held on 4 December 2021. Tomio Okamura was elected for third term.

== Background ==
Tomio Okamura founded the party in 2015 after he split from Dawn. He was elected party's leader the same year. Okamura led the party during 2021 legislative election during which it received 9.5% compared to 10.6% from 2017 election. Okamura still called it a good result noting that SPD lost some voters to smaller parties with similar programs. Leadership election was scheduled for 4 December 2021. Tomio Okamura announced he will seek reelection. He was the only candidate. MEP Hynek Blaško reportedly planned to run against Okamura, but he wasn't invited to the conference and thus was unable to participate in the election.

== Voting ==
85 delegates were allowed to vote on a party conference. Delegates had to participate through online devices due to COVID-19. Okamura received 84 votes. Okamura himself abstained from voting. He stated that he considers the result a great award for his work and a big obligation to members of the party.

Candidate	Vote	%
Tomio Okamura	84	98.82%
Against	1	1.18%
