= Opinion polling for the 2013 Czech presidential election =

This page lists nationwide public opinion polls that have been conducted relating to the 2013 presidential elections in the Czech Republic.

== Opinion polls for the first round ==
View source data.

== First round ==
Date	Agency	Fischer	Švejnar	Zeman	Dienstbier	Schwarzenberg	Sobotka	Roithová	Bobošíková	Fischerová	Franz	Tošenovský	Okamura	Dlouhý	Němcová	Jakl	Remek	Others
12 January 2013	1st round result	16.3	-	24.2	16.1	23.4	2.5	5.0	2.4	3.2	6.8	-	-	-	-	-	-	-
7 Jan 2013	Sanep	16.2	-	23.6	14.3	14.2	5.1	5.3	3.4	2.7	3.9	-	-	-	-	-	-	11.3
6 Jan 2013	PPM Factum	20.1	-	25.1	10.6	11.0	7.1	4.6	5.6	4.6	11.4	-	-	-	-	-	-	-
20 Dec 2012	Sanep	21.7	-	25.8	8.3	10.3	6.7	5.1	4.5	4.8	7.3	-	-	-	-	-	-	5.0
12 Dec 2012	PPM Factum	25.0	-	25.6	10.6	9.2	6.8	4.4	4.1	4.4	9.8		-	-	-	-	-	-
3 - 10 Dec	CVVM	22.5	-	19.5	13.0	7.0	3.5	4.5	2.0	2.5	5.5	-	5.0	2.5	-	-	-	12.5
23 Nov 2012	PPM Factum	33.2	-	23.6	10.1	7.0	7.3	5.9	-	5.8	7.1	-	-	-	-	-	-	-
12 - 19 Nov 2012	CVVM	23.5	-	19.5	9.0	7.0	2.0	2.5	3.0	2.0	4.0	-	9.5	2.5	-	-	-	15.5
15 Nov 2012	STEM	32.3	-	14.1	11.6	4.7	4.2	2.1	2.4	2.1	2.6	-	8.2	1.9	-	-	-	13.7
12 Nov 2012	PPM Factum	28.1	-	19.4	8.8	6.7	6.4	3.3	4.3	4.6	5.6	-	10.0	2.9	-	-	-	-
15 Oct 2012	PPM Factum	30.1	-	21.9	6.5	6.6	4.3	3.6	4,5	-	4.5		7.9	2.8	-	-	-	7.2
15 Oct 2012	STEM	29.8	-	16.5	13.9	5.5	6.5	-	4.3	-	-	-	-	-	-	-	-	13.8
16 Sep 2012	PPM Factum	27.7	-	22.7	6.9	5.9	5.7	3.4	3.8	-	6.6	-	6.1	4.5	-	-	-	6.7
13 Sep 2012	STEM	30.0	12.0	15.0	9.0	6.0	4.0	-	-	-	-	-	-	-	-	-	-	14.0
31 Aug 2012	Sanep	24.8	-	23.6	10.8	7.8	6.4	5.6	4.5	5.6	3.3	-	2.6	-	-	5.0	-	1.9
10 Aug 2012	Median	34.5	11.5	14.0	6.0	6.0	4.5	-	7.0	-	-	-	-	6.0	-	-	3.5	7.0
25 Jul 2012	PPM Factum	22.2	12.2	18.2	8.2	6.6	4.3	3.7	6.4	-	-	-	6.9	-	-	-	-	11.3
24 Jul 2012	Sanep	19.7	11.5	16.8	7.3	4.3	3.8	5.4	3.5	-	-	-	5.6	1.7	-	4.8	-	23.6
26 Jun 2012	PPM Factum	25.3	15.8	13.4	8.5	5.2	3.1	-	7.6	-	-	-	8.8	-	-	-	-	12.3
15 Jun 2012	Sanep	23.1	15.2	14.5	6.2	7.6	2.9	5.1	3.4	-	-	1.4	6.1	-	-	-	-	21.6
28 May 2012	Millward Brown	21.4	15.6	8.1	6.5	8.8	-	-	-	-	-	-	-	-	-	-	-	-
8 May 2012	Median	33.0	17.5	11.0	4.5	6.5	3.5	-	4.0	-	-	5.0	5.0	-	-	-	-	10.0
6 May 2012	PPM Factum	24.4	17.8	12.0	5.3	5.5	4.6	3.8	6.6	-	-	-	9.9	-	-	-	-	10.2
14 Apr 2012	Median	31.5	19.0	10.5	7.5	6.5	4.0	-	4.5	-	-	3.5	4.0	-	-	-	-	6.5
11 Apr 2012	PPM Factum	23.3	17.2	10.0	5.5	8.3	-	4.0	7.0	-	-	-	7.9	-	5.6	-	-	16.9
14 Mar 2012	PPM Factum	21.8	15.1	10.2	7.4	8.2	3.2	3.0	7.5	-	-	-	6.1	-	6.9	-	-	10.6
24 Feb 2012	Sanep	21.2	12.6	6.3	-	9.7	2.8	2.6	2.3	-	3.4	-	-	-	7.6	-	2.9	28.6
15 Feb 2012	PPM Factum	24.5	14.5	9.7	-	8.4	-	3.0	-	-	-	-	-	-	9.7	-	4.0	26.2
10 Feb 2012	Median	33.0	16.5	-	-	6.5	3.0	-	-	-	-	-	-	12.4	-	-	-	
28 Sep 2011	SC&C	27.0	20.0	-	-	14.0	11.0	-	10.0	-	-	-	-	-	17.0	-	-	18.0
28 December 2010	Median	-	9.9	4.9	-	4.0	2.9	-	-	1.3	-	-	-	-	-	-	-	77.0

== Second round ==
Date	Agency	Zeman	Schwarzenberg	Fischer	Undecided
26 Jan 2013	2nd round result	54.8	45.2	-	0
20 Jan 2013	Sanep	44.5	41.4	-	14.1
17 Jan 2013	PPM Factum	53.7	46.3	-	0
31 Aug 2012	Sanep	48.9	-	51.1	0

== Acceptability of candidates ==
Date	Agency	Fischer	Švejnar	Zeman	Undecided
14 Apr 2012	Median	56.0	43.5	17.5	0.5

== Media survey ==
=== First round ===
Date	Agency	Fischer	Švejnar	Zeman	Dienstbier	Schwarzenberg	Sobotka	Roithová	Bobošíková	Fischerová	Franz	Okamura	Dlouhý	Others
14 Nov 2012	iDnes Survey	11.2	-	11.7	3.8	16.3	4.2	4.1	1.1	6.7	26.1	11.7	3.2	-
7 Nov 2012	Reflex Survey	3.0	-	13.0	6.0	43.0	4.0	3.0	1.0	4.0	23.0	-	-	-
2 Mar 2012	Blesk	32.0	12.0	10.0	6.0	4.0	-	-	6.0	-	-	10.0	-	21.0
26 Dec 2011	iDNES survey	18.4	12.7	7.3	-	16.1	3.2	-	1.2	-	-	17.7	-	23.3

=== Second round ===
Date	Agency	Zeman	Schwarzenberg	Fischer	Franz	Okamura	Undecided
18 Nov 2013	iDnes Survey	-	44.3	-	55.7	-	-
15 Nov 2012	Blesk Survey	59.0	-	41.0	-	-	-
8 Nov 2012	Reflex Survey	-	32.0	-	68.0	-	-
6 Jan 2012	iDNES Survey	-	-	52.5	-	47.5	0

== Other voting ==
Date	Agency	Fischer	Zeman	Dienstbier	Schwarzenberg	Sobotka	Roithová	Bobošíková	Fischerová	Franz
12 Dec 2012	Student Election	19.4	9.4	3.2	14.6	3.2	4.4	-	5.0	40.7
