= Martin Stropnický =

Czech politician and diplomat

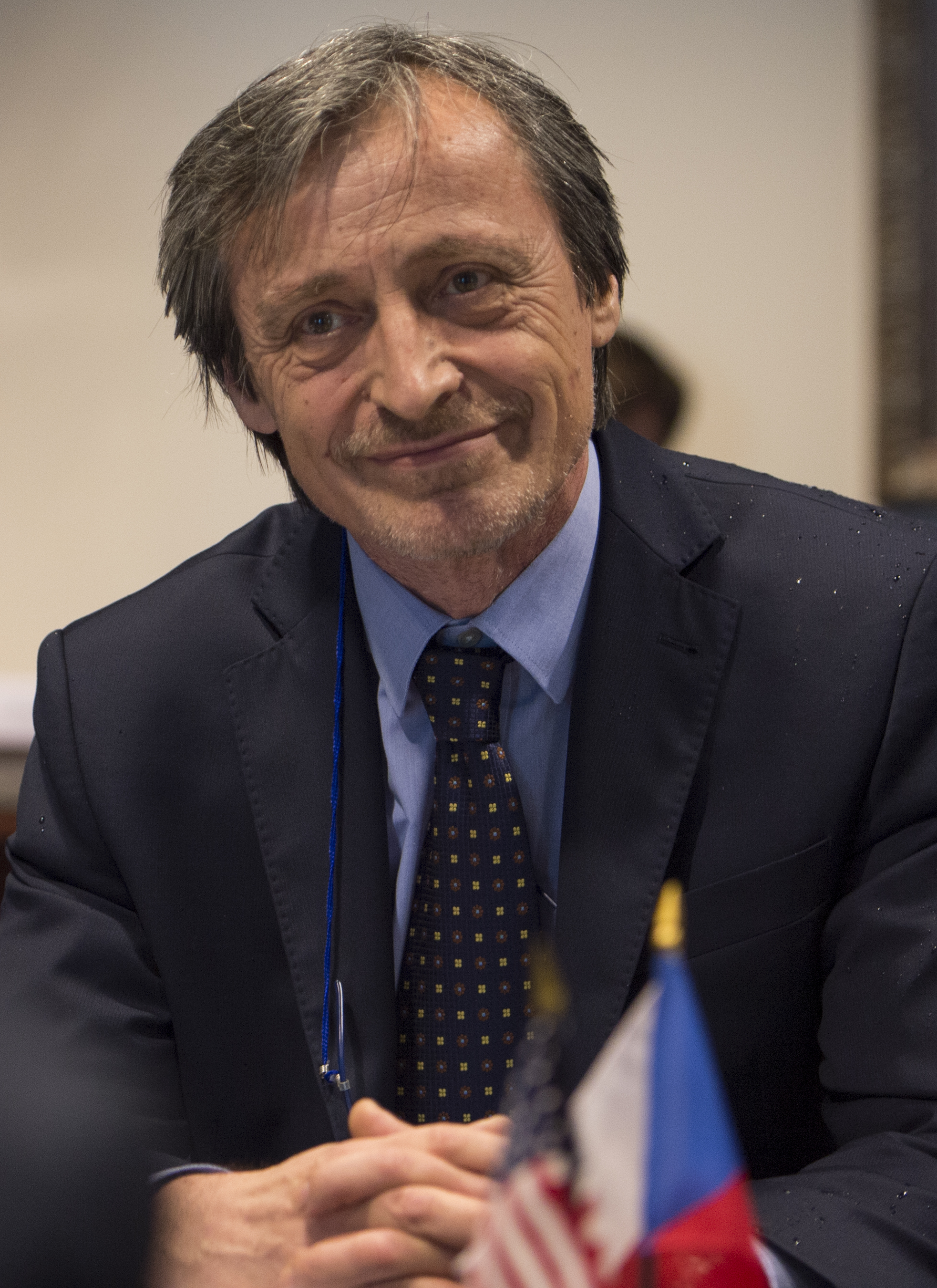

Deputy Prime Minister of the Czech Republic
- In office 13 December 2017 – 27 June 2018
- Prime Minister: Andrej Babiš
- Preceded by: Pavel Bělobrádek
- Succeeded by: Jan Hamáček

Minister of Foreign Affairs
- In office 13 December 2017 – 27 June 2018
- Prime Minister: Andrej Babiš
- Preceded by: Lubomír Zaorálek
- Succeeded by: Jan Hamáček (acting)

Minister of Defence
- In office 29 January 2014 – 13 December 2017
- Prime Minister: Bohuslav Sobotka
- Preceded by: Vlastimil Picek
- Succeeded by: Karla Šlechtová

Minister of Culture
- In office 2 January 1998 – 22 July 1998
- Prime Minister: Josef Tošovský
- Preceded by: Jaromír Talíř
- Succeeded by: Pavel Dostál

Czech Republic Ambassador to the State of Israel
- In office 9 November 2018 – 31 July 2023
- President: Miloš Zeman
- Preceded by: Ivo Schwarz
- Succeeded by: Veronika Kuchyňová Šmigolová

Member of the Chamber of Deputies
- In office 26 October 2013 – 1 October 2018

Personal details
- Born: 19 December 1956 (age 69) Prague, Czechoslovakia (now Czech Republic)
- Party: ANO 2011 (2013–2023)
- Spouse: Lucie Stropnická (div.): Veronika Stropnická (m. 2008–2023)
- Children: 5
- Education: Academy of Performing Arts in Prague

Martin Stropnický (born 19 December 1956) is a Czech politician and diplomat who served as the minister of Foreign Affairs from December 2017 to June 2018, and was previously minister of Defence from 2014 to 2017. From 2 January 1998 to 22 July 1998 he also served as the minister of Culture. Before entering politics, he was an actor, songwriter, author and director.

== Career ==
Stropnický graduated from the Theatre Faculty of the Academy of Performing Arts in Prague (DAMU) in 1980, and worked in different theatres in Prague over the next decade including the Prague Municipal Theatre and the Vinohrady Theatre.

In 1990 he began working at the Czechoslovak Ministry of Foreign Affairs (which became the Czech Ministry of Foreign Affairs two years later). He graduated from the Diplomatic Academy of Vienna in 1991, and subsequently served as the Czech Ambassador to Portugal (1993–94) and then Italy (1994-97).

For a six-month period from January to July 1998, Stropnický was appointed Czech Minister of Culture in the caretaker government of Josef Tošovský. He subsequently returned to the diplomatic service, serving as Czech Ambassador to the Vatican from 1999 to 2003, before returning to the Vinohrady Theatre as artistic director.

He was elected to the Chamber of Deputies in 2013 and served as Minister of Defence in Bohuslav Sobotka's Cabinet. Following the 2017 legislative election, which saw Andrej Babiš taking over as prime minister, Stropnický became Minister for Foreign Affairs, as well as deputy prime minister, assuming both positions on 13 December 2017. However, Babiš' government lost a confidence vote in the Chamber of Deputies, and Stropnický was succeeded on 27 June 2018 by Jan Hamáček.

On 1 October 2018, Stropnický resigned from Parliament to return to the diplomatic service as Czech Ambassador to Israel. After the end of his mission in Israel, Stropnický left ANO 2011.

== Personal life ==
Stropnický was married. In addition to Czech, he speaks English, French, and Italian, with a passive knowledge of Portuguese, Russian, and German. Stropnický is the father of former Green Party councillor Matěj Stropnický.

Government offices
Preceded by Vlastimil Picek	Minister of Defence; 2014–2017	Succeeded by Karla Šlechtová
Preceded by Pavel Bělobrádek	Deputy Prime Minister of the Czech Republic; 2017–2018; Served alongside: Richard Brabec	Succeeded by Jan Hamáček
Preceded by Lubomír Zaorálek	Minister of Foreign Affairs; 2017–2018	Succeeded by Tomáš Petříček
