= 2010 President of the Chamber of Deputies of the Parliament of the Czech Republic election =

2010 President of the Chamber of Deputies of the Parliament of the Czech Republic
- 24 June 2010
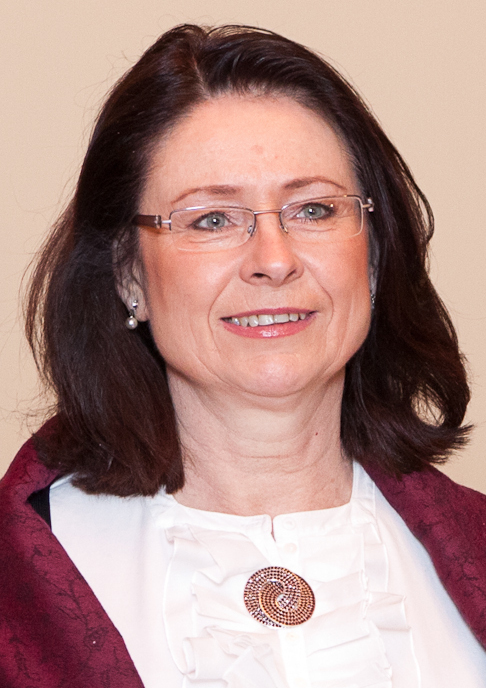

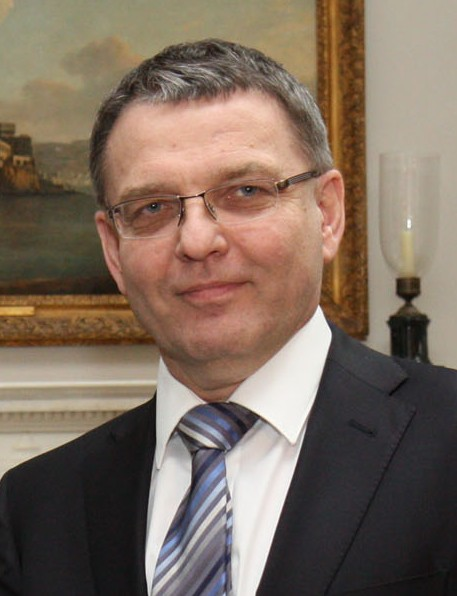
Candidate	Miroslava Němcová	Lubomír Zaorálek
Party	ODS	ČSSD
Popular vote	118	79
Percentage	59.9%	40.1%
President before election
Miloslav Vlček
ČSSD
Elected President
Miroslava Němcová
ODS

Election of the President of the Chamber of Deputies of the Parliament of the Czech Republic was held on 24 June 2010. Miroslava Němcová clashed with Lubomír Zaorálek. Němcová defeated Zaorálek and was elected the new President.

== Background ==
President election was held after legislative election that concluded with victory of centre-right parties. Civic Democratic Party decided to nominate Miroslava Němcová while Czech Social Democratic Party nominated Lubomír Zaorálek. TOP 09 and Public Affairs agreed to support Němcová for the position.

== Voting ==
Voting took place on 24 June 2010. Němcová received 118 votes while Zaorálek 79. Němcová became the first female President of the Chamber. Němcová stated that she wants to keep two goals of the governing coalition - to cut spending and to do politics as a public service.
