= 2017 President of the Chamber of Deputies of the Parliament of the Czech Republic election =

2017 President of the Chamber of Deputies of the Parliament of the Czech Republic
- 22 November 2017
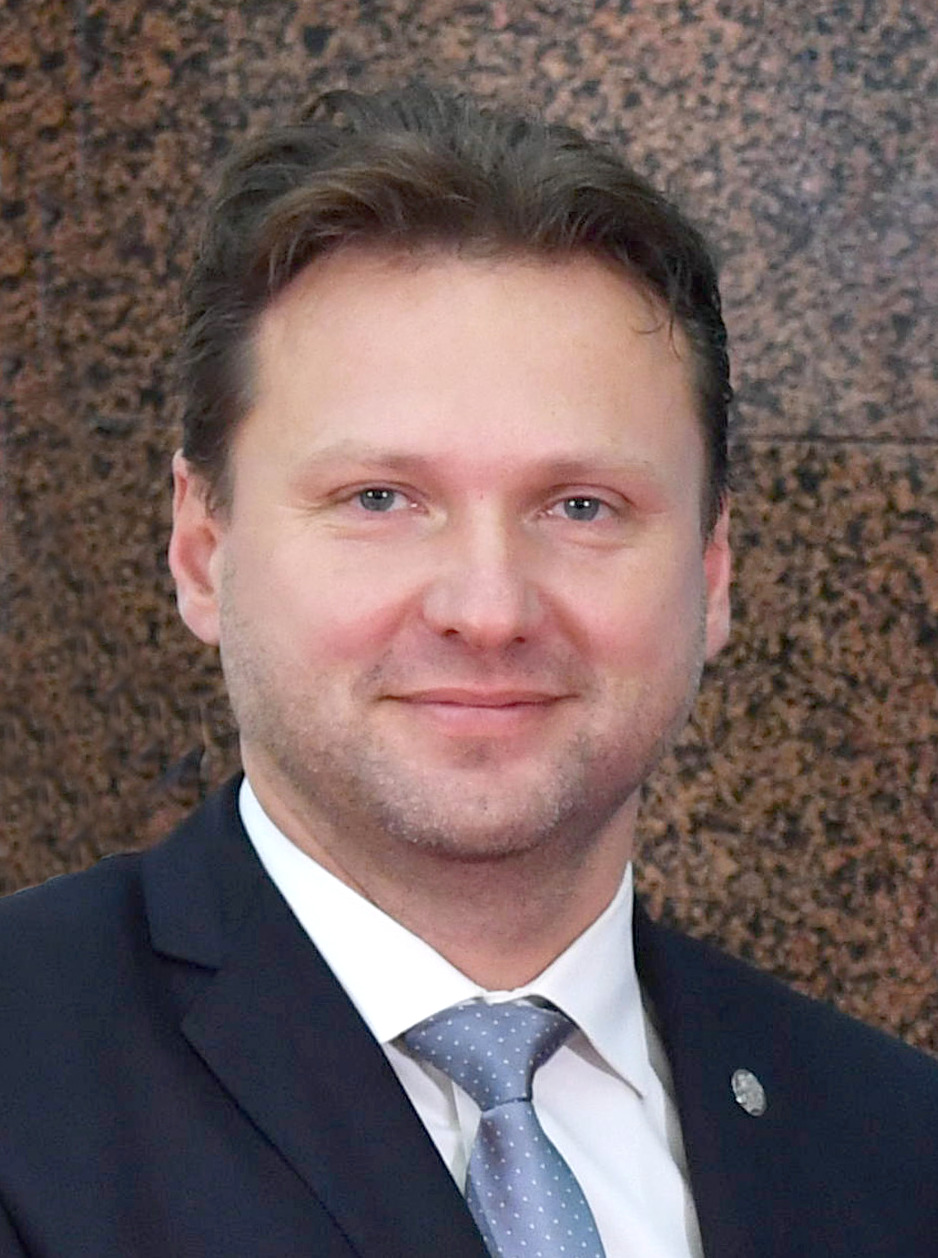
Candidate	Radek Vondráček
Party	ANO
Popular vote	135
Percentage	68.5%
President before election
Jan Hamáček
ČSSD
Elected President
Radek Vondráček
ANO

On 20 November 2017, the Chamber of Deputies of the Czech Republic held an election for its president following that year's parliamentary election. Radek Vondráček of ANO 2011 won the election with the support of 135 deputies.

== Background ==
The Czech Republic held its parliamentary election on 20 and 21 October 2017, which resulted in the defeat of the ruling. Czech Social Democratic Party (ČSSD)

ANO 2011, under the leadership of Andrej Babiš, won a plurality of 78 seats. The conservative Civic Democratic Party emerged as the second-largest party in the chamber, taking 25 seats. Prior to the election, Jan Hamáček of the ČSSD served as President of the Chamber.

== Election ==
=== Candidates ===
==== Won election ====
- Radek Vondráček (ANO 2011), member of the Chamber of Deputies (2013-present)

==== Withdrew before election ====
- Petr Fiala, leader of the Civic Democratic Party (withdrew)

=== Developments and vote ===
Following the election, ANO 2011 announced it would nominate Radek Vondráček to serve as President of the Chamber. On 23 October 2017, Freedom and Direct Democracy agreed to support Vondráček. Combined, the parties controlled 100 seats out of 200. The Czech Pirate Party announced it would support his candidacy on 29 October 2017.

On 24 October 2017, the Civic Democratic Party announced it would nominate Petr Fiala as its candidate. Jan Zahradil stated that Fiala's candidacy is to show him as the leader of right-wing opposition. TOP 09 announced it wouldn't support Vondráček. On 31 October 2017, Miroslav Kalousek the leader of TOP 09 called parties to vote for neither of 2 candidates and to jam up the Chamber. This would prevent Andrej Babiš from becoming prime minister.

Fiala withdrawn from the election on 15 November 2017 because Vondráček had support of Pirates and SPD. On 22 November 2017, Vondráček was elected the President of the Chamber of Deputies. He received 135 votes. 14 votes were against and 46 blank.
