= 2018 Freedom and Direct Democracy leadership election =

Czech political party leadership election

- 14 July 2018
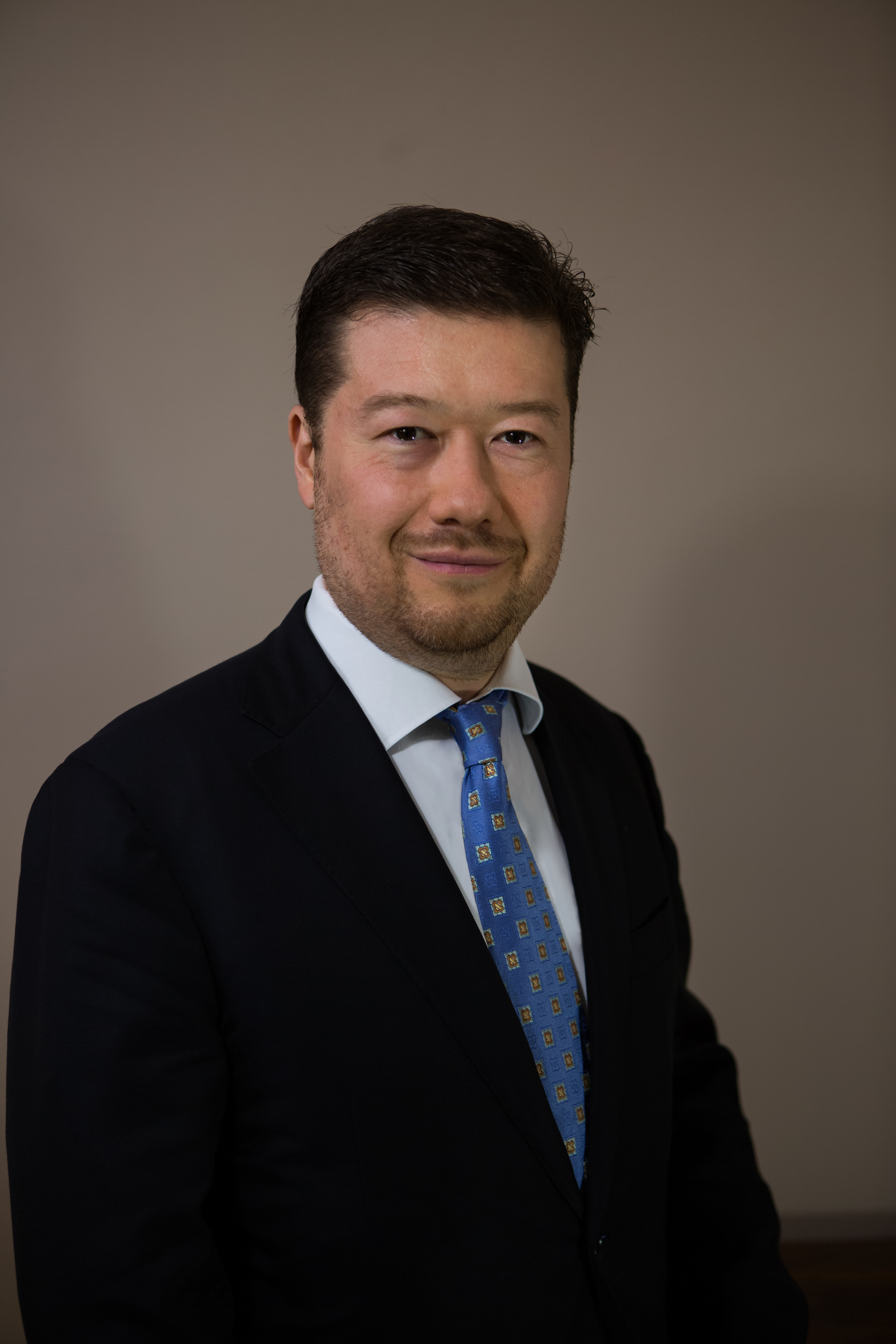
Candidate	Tomio Okamura
Electoral vote	150
Percentage	98.7%
leader of SPD before election
Tomio Okamura
Elected leader of SPD
Tomio Okamura

The Freedom and Direct Democracy (SPD) leadership election of 2018 was held on 14 July 2018. Tomio Okamura was elected for second term.

== Background ==
Tomio Okamura founded the party in 2015 after he split from Dawn. He was elected party's leader the same year. Okamura led the party during 2017 legislative election. It received 10.6% of votes and came fourth.

New leadership election was scheduled for 14 July 2018. Tomio Okamura announced he will seek reelection. No other candidate was announced. It was reported that candidates might be announced on the day of election.

== Voting ==
Leader is elected by 162 delegates. 140 of them are nominated by regional organisations while remaining 22 are party's MPs.

152 delegates eventually participated. Okamura received 150 votes and thus was reelected. Okamura thanked delegates for a strong mandate. Okamura himself didn't vote in the election. Only one delegate voted against him. Okamura's term will expire in 2021.

Candidate	Vote	%
Tomio Okamura	150	98.68%
Against	2	1.32%
