= Vítězslav Jandák =

Czech actor and politician (born 1947)

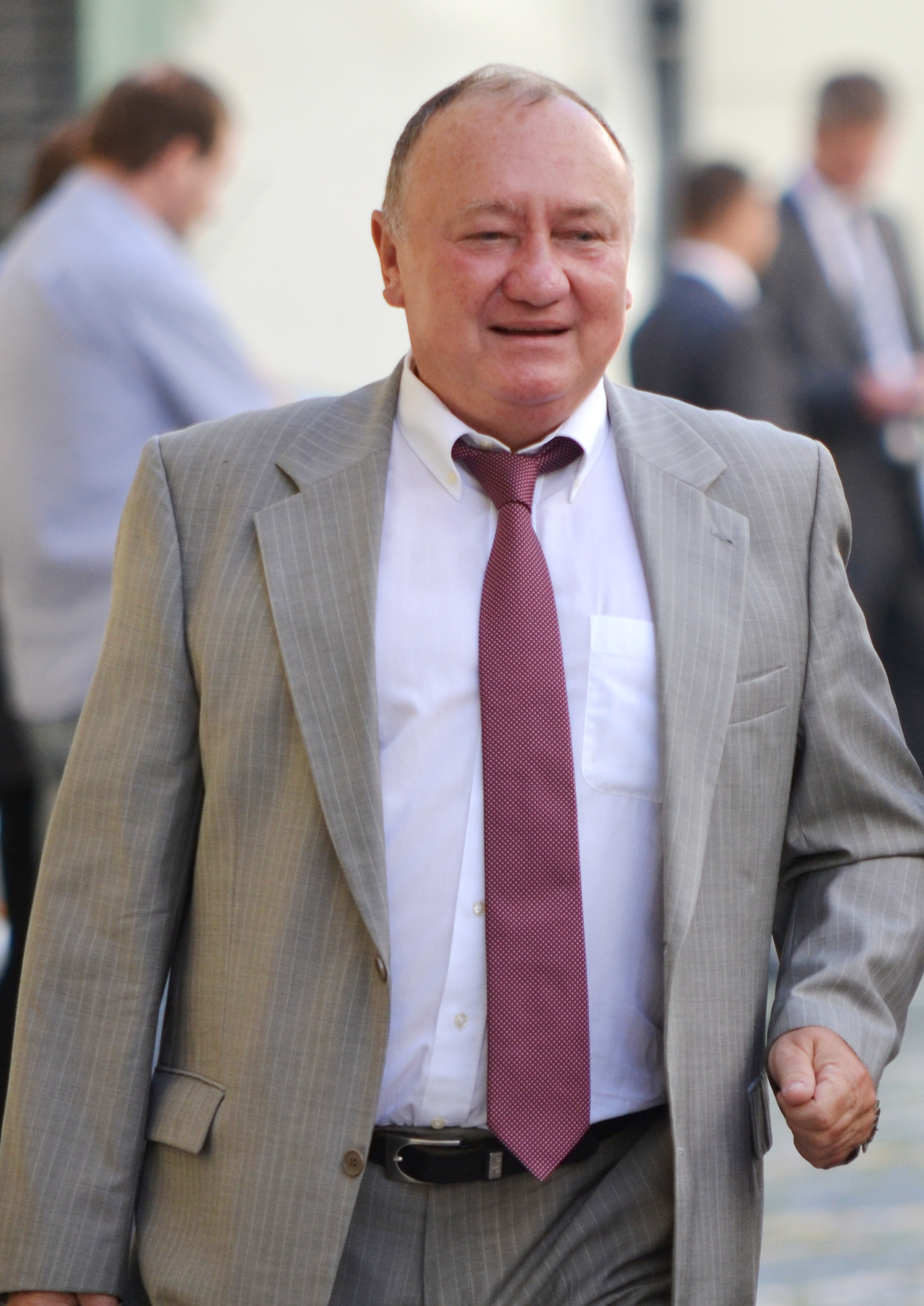

6th Minister of Culture of the Czech Republic
- In office 17 August 2005 – 4 September 2006
- Prime Minister: Jiří Paroubek
- Preceded by: Pavel Dostál
- Succeeded by: Martin Štěpánek

Member of the Chamber of Deputies
- In office 3 June 2006 – 28 August 2013
- In office 26 October 2013 – 9 June 2017

Personal details
- Born: 3 August 1947 (age 78) Prague, Czechoslovakia
- Party: Republikánská unie (1990–1994) KDU-ČSL (1994–1998); ODS (1998–2002) ČSSD (2013–2017)
- Occupation: Actor, politician

Vítězslav Jandák (born 3 August 1947) is a Czech actor and politician who served as the Minister of Culture of the Czech Republic in Cabinet of Jiří Paroubek from 2005 to 2006. He also served as Member of the Chamber of Deputies (MP) from 2006 to 2013 and from 2013 to 2017.

== Selected filmography ==
=== Film ===
- Tři oříšky pro Popelku (1973)
- Smoke on the Potato Fields (1977)
- Who's That Soldier? (1987)
- Tankový prapor (1991)
- Helluva Good Luck (1999)
- The Conception of My Younger Brother (2000)
- Rašín (2018)

=== Television ===
- Černí baroni (2004)
