= 2025 President of the Chamber of Deputies of the Parliament of the Czech Republic election =

2025 President of the Chamber of Deputies of the Parliament of the Czech Republic
- 5 November 2025

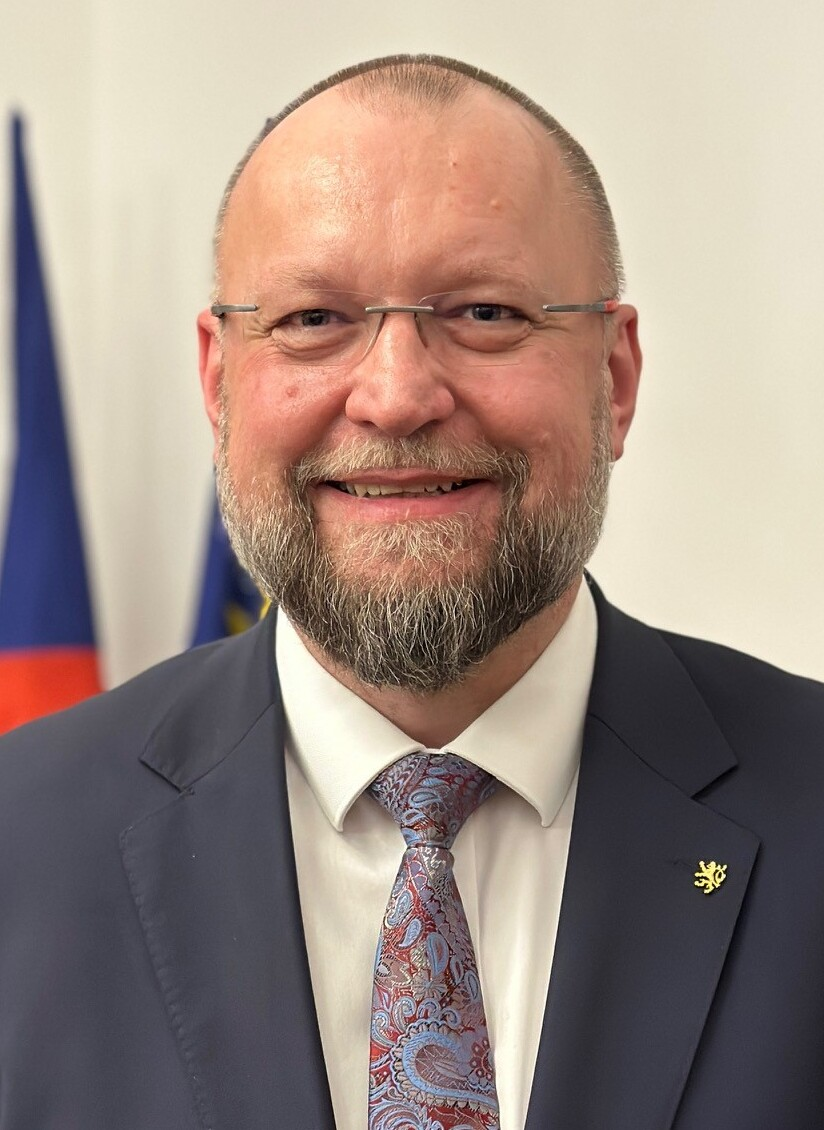
Candidate	Tomio Okamura	Jan Bartošek
Party	SPD	KDU-ČSL
Popular vote	107	87
Percentage	54.3%	41.1%
President before election
Markéta Pekarová Adamová
TOP 09
Elected President
Tomio Okamura
SPD

Election of the President of the Chamber of Deputies of the Parliament of the Czech Republic was held on 5 November 2025. The incumbent leader Markéta Pekarová Adamová decided to not seek reelection for her parliamentary seat and thus was ineligible to run. Tomio Okamura was elected the new President of the Chamber.

== Background ==
Following the 2025 Czech parliamentary election a new President of the Chamber of Deputies will be elected at the first meeting of the new Chamber of Deputies. The meeting would be called by the President no later than 30 days following the election. If the President does not call it then it will be held 30 days after the election.

President Petr Pavel called the meeting for 3 November 2025. The parliamentary election resulted in victory for ANO and its leader Andrej Babiš being expected to form the next government with Freedom and Direct Democracy (SPD) and Motorists for Themselves (AUTO). Babiš stated on 6 October 2025 that SPD seeks support for its nominee for President of the Chamber of Deputies. He noted that leader of the party Tomio Okamura could become the next President of the Chamber. Alena Schillerová, Deputy leader of ANO who was designated to lead negotiations related to Presidency of the new Chamber also stated that she can imagine Okamura as the new President of the Chamber. Vít Rakušan, leader of Mayors and Independents criticised Okamura's nomination. On 10 October 2025 Andrej Babiš announced that ANO, SPD and AUTO agreed to form coalition government. Part of the agreement was that Okamura will become President of the Chamber. Leader of TOP 09 MP group Jan Jakob stated that TOP 09 will not support Okamura's candidacy. On 15 October 2025, President of the Senate Miloš Vystrčil called for actions to prevent Okamura's election, noting Okamura has repeatedly spoken out in favor of the Czech Republic leaving the European Union.

On 21 October 2025, leader of Civic Democratic Party (ODS) MP Group Marek Benda announced that the ODS will not nominate its own candidate. On 22 October 2025, KDU-ČSL announced it would nominate Jan Bartošek as Okamura is unacceptable for the party. KDU-ČSL reportedly planned to persuade more liberal ANO MPs to support Bartošek.

== Candidates ==
- Jan Bartošek (KDU-ČSL)
- Tomio Okamura (SPD), leader of the party.

=== Declined ===
- Hayato Okamura (KDU-ČSL), was reportedly considered as a candidate by KDU-ČSL and other Spolu parties due to being Tomio Okamura's brother. KDU-ČSL eventually decided to nominate Jan Bartošek instead.
- Jan Skopeček (ODS), was mentioned as a candidate that would be more acceptable for some ANO MPs than Okamura. He ran for the position of Deputy President instead.

== Composition of the Chamber of Deputies ==
Composition of the Chamber of Deputies
Party	Ideology	Chamber Leader	Seats	Supported candidate
ANO	Right-wing populism	Taťána Malá	80 / 200	Tomio Okamura
Civic Democratic Party	Conservatism	Marek Benda	27 / 200	
Mayors and Independents	Localism	Michaela Šebelová	22 / 200	
Czech Pirate Party	Pirate politics	Olga Richterová	18 / 200	
KDU-ČSL	Christian democracy	Tom Philipp	16 / 200	Jan Bartošek
Freedom and Direct Democracy	Neo-fascism	Radim Fiala	15 / 200	Tomio Okamura
Motorists for Themselves	National conservatism	Boris Šťastný	13 / 200	Tomio Okamura
TOP 09	Liberal conservatism	Jan Jakob	9 / 200	

== Voting ==
Voting was held on 5 November 2025. Okamura defeated Bartošek.

Candidate	Party	Votes	
Tomio Okamura	Freedom and Direct Democracy	107 / 197	51.31%
Jan Bartošek	KDU-ČSL	81 / 197	41.11%
None		12 / 197	6,09%
