= Pavel Dostál =

Czech politician and theater director (1943–2005)

Minister of Culture
- In office 22 July 1998 – 24 July 2005
- Prime Minister: Miloš Zeman; Vladimír Špidla; Stanislav Gross; Jiří Paroubek
- Preceded by: Martin Stropnický
- Succeeded by: Vítězslav Jandák

Member of the Chamber of Deputies
- In office 1 June 1996 – 24 July 2005

Member of the Federal Assembly
- In office 7 June 1990 – 31 December 1992

Personal details
- Born: 25 February 1943 Olomouc, Protectorate of Bohemia and Moravia (now Czech Republic)
- Died: 24 July 2005 (aged 62) Brno, Czech Republic
- Party: Communist Party (1962–1969); Civic Forum (1989–1991); Social Democratic Club of Civic Forum (1991–1992); Social Democratic Party (1992–2005)

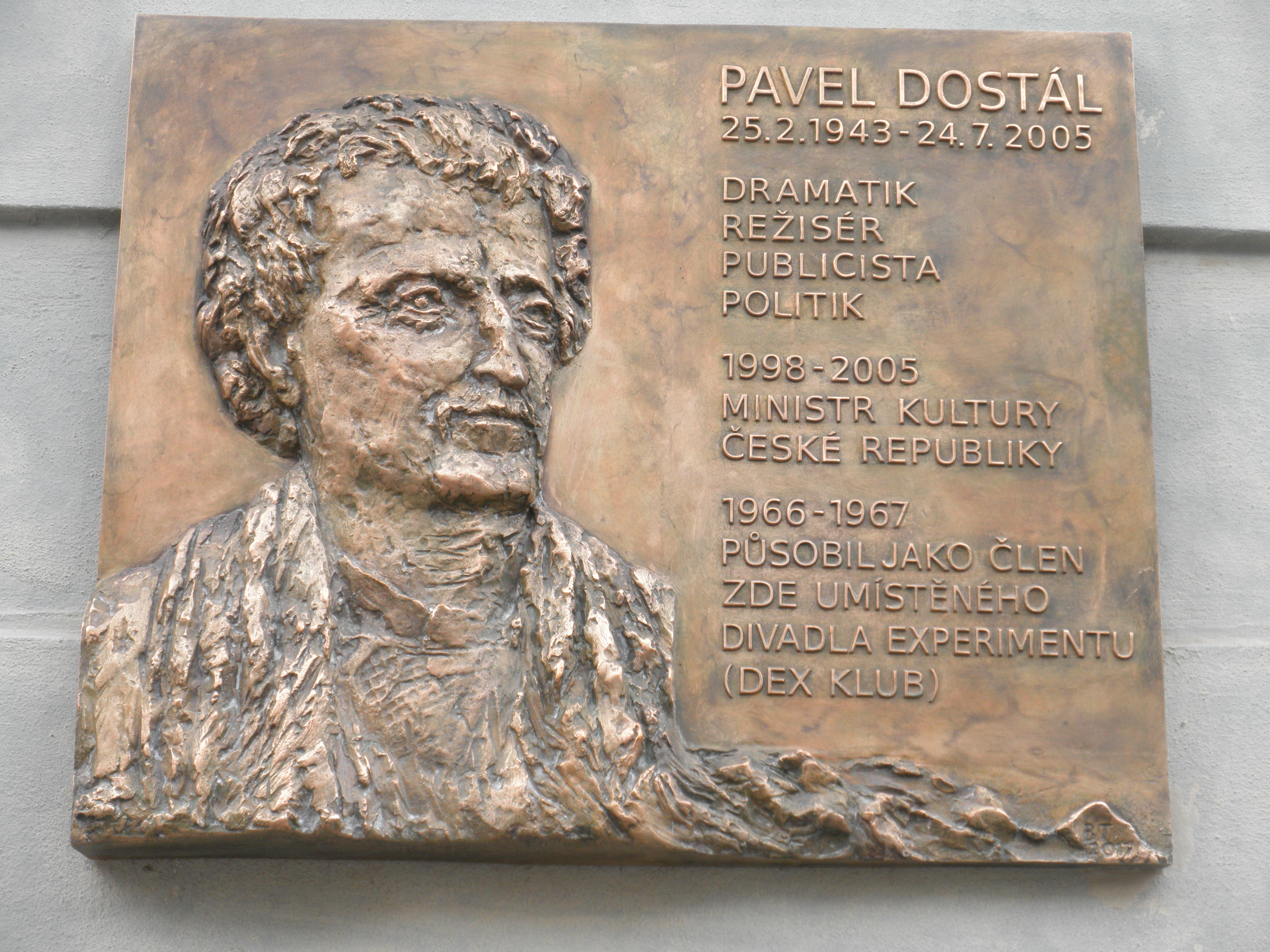
Memorial plaque to Pavel Dostál in Olomouc

Pavel Dostál (25 February 1943 – 24 July 2005) was the Minister of Culture from 1998 to 2005.

Born in Olomouc, North Moravia in 1943, Dostál took an early interest in theatre. In 1966, he put aside his technician trade in order to become the artistic director of the Experimental Theatre in Olomouc. For the next few years, he was active as a theatre producer, and a writer of plays, TV scripts, and magazine columns. During this time, Dostál was member of the Communist Party of Czechoslovakia. Disillusionment struck him in August 1968, when the Soviet Army invaded Czechoslovakia. Dostál took part in the underground radio broadcasts at Czechoslovak Radio, which was central to local resistance to the Communist occupation. He did not formally end his Communist Party membership until the following year, in protest against the government placement of pro-Soviet Gustáv Husák.

Due to these activities, he was kept under surveillance by the STB secret police, and allowed only to work at labour and technical jobs for 20 years. Still, he made attempts at protest during this time, and was detained as late as 1989, for the distribution of a petition.

Dostál was able to return to theatre again after the revolution in 1989. As before, he worked in theatre in Olomouc. He became active in governmental politics during this time. In 1991, he joined the Social Democratic Party (ČSSD), and, in 1996, was eventually elected as a Member of Parliament for that party. In 1998, Dostál was appointed Minister of Culture for the Czech Republic.

During his tenure, Dostál often spoke out in defence of Czech minorities. He was once attacked with a knife for his support of Czech Romani. He served as Minister of Culture until his death on 24 July 2005, after suffering from pancreatic cancer for nearly a year.

Government offices
Preceded by Martin Stropnický	Minister of Culture of the Czech Republic; 1998–2005	Succeeded by Vítězslav Jandák
