= 2013 President of the Chamber of Deputies of the Parliament of the Czech Republic election =

2013 President of the Chamber of Deputies of the Parliament of the Czech Republic
- 27 November 2013
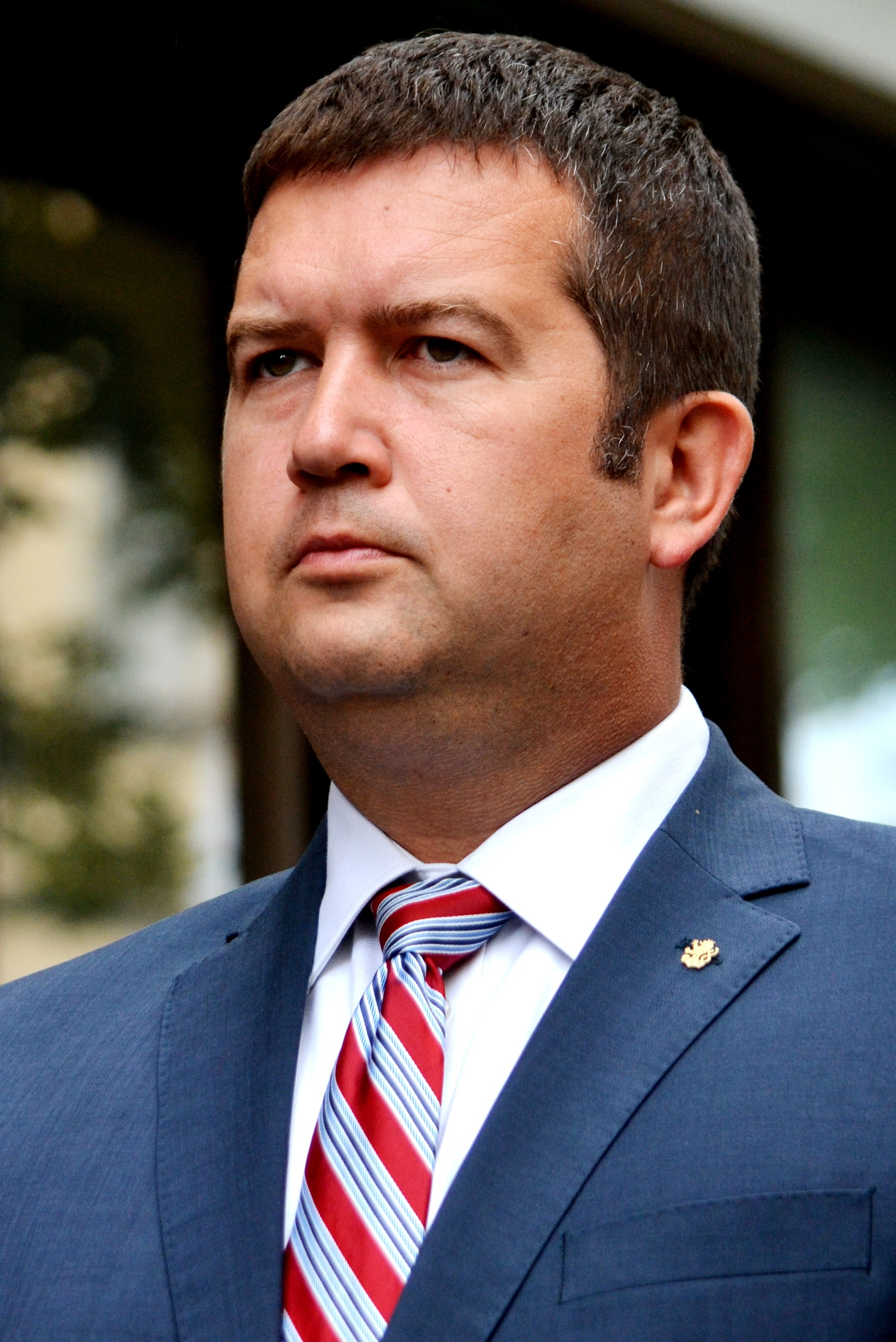
Candidate	Jan Hamáček
Party	ČSSD
Popular vote	195
Percentage	98.48%
President before election
Miroslava Němcová
ODS
Elected President
Jan Hamáček
ČSSD

Election of the President of the Chamber of Deputies of the Parliament of the Czech Republic was held on 27 November 2013. Jan Hamáček was elected the new President. Hamáček was the nominee of Czech Social Democratic Party but received support from other coalition parties - ANO 2011, Christian and Democratic Union – Czechoslovak People's Party. Civic Democratic Party (Czech Republic) and TOP 09 also gave him an endorsement. Hamáček is the youngest President of the Chamber.

== Voting ==
Voting took place on 27 November 2013. Hamáček was the only candidate. He received 195 votes of 198 and became the new President. The incumbent president, Miroslava Němcová, did not seek reelection. She sought position of vice-chairwoman instead but was unsuccessful.
