= 2021 President of the Chamber of Deputies of the Parliament of the Czech Republic election =

2021 President of the Chamber of Deputies of the Parliament of the Czech Republic
- 10 November 2021
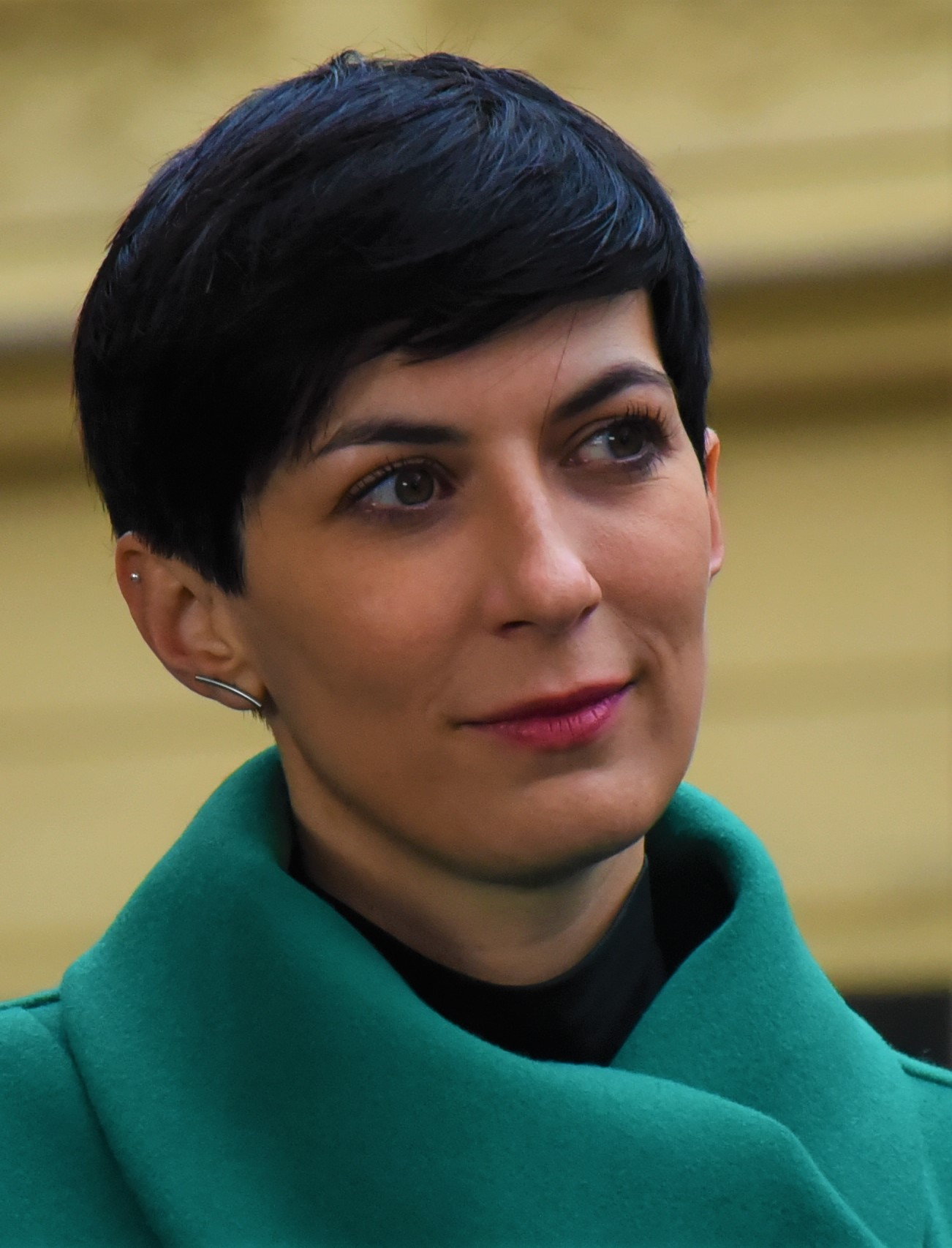
Candidate	Markéta Pekarová Adamová
Party	TOP 09
Popular vote	102
Percentage	52.6%
President before election
Radek Vondráček
ANO
Elected President
Markéta Pekarová Adamová
TOP 09

Election of the President of the Chamber of Deputies of the Parliament of the Czech Republic was held on 10 November 2021.

== Background ==
Following 2021 Czech legislative election new President of the Chamber of Deputies will be elected at first meeting of the new Chamber of Deputies. Meeting would be called by President no later than 30 days following the election. If President doesn't call it then it will be held 30 day after election. Legislative election was won by conservative alliance SPOLU ahead of populist ANO 2011. Liberal alliance Pirates and Mayors (PaS) came third while nationalist Freedom and Direct Democracy (SPD) was fourth.

SPOLU and PaS agreed following legislative election that upcoming President would be a representative of upcoming governing coalition. Marian Jurečka stated that SPOLU as a victor of legislative election will seek to get its representative to be the new President. Incumbent President Radek Vondráček stated that ANO 2011 will also nominate its candidate. Deputy leader of ODS Zbyněk Stanjura confirmed on 12 October 2021 that SPOLU will nominate its candidate for President. ANO 2011 leader Andrej Babiš announced on 12 October 2021 that his party decided to not nominate its candidate. SPOLU announced leader of TOP 09 Markéta Pekarová Adamová on 19 October 2021. She also gained support of Pirates and Mayors On 8 November 2021 ANO 2011 nominated Minister Karel Havlíček as its candidate.

== Candidates ==
- Markéta Pekarová Adamová (TOP 09), leader of the party. Candidate of SPOLU. Announced as a candidate of SPOLU on 19 October 2021.
- Karel Havlíček (ANO 2011), Minister of Industry and Trade and Minister of Transport.

=== Declined ===
- Andrej Babiš, outgoing Prime Minister and leader of ANO 2011. It was speculated that SPOLU could offer him nomination. Babiš stated that he would refuse such offer.
- Marek Benda (ODS), longest serving MP. Discussed by ODS as potential candidate of SPOLU according to Seznam zprávy.
- Petr Gazdík (STAN), MP and former leader of party. Discussed as potential candidate of Pirates and Mayors according to Seznam zprávy.
- Helena Langšádlová (TOP 09), MP. Discussed as potential candidate of SPOLU according to seznam zprávy.
- Tomio Okamura (SPD), MP, leader of the party and incumbent Vice President. Admitted interest in standing.
- Radek Vondráček (ANO 2011), the incumbent President. Jaroslav Faltýnek stated that ANO 2011 wants him to be reelected. His party eventually decided to not nominate him as a candidate.

== Voting ==
Voting was scheduled for constituent meeting on 8 November 2021 but the meeting was adjourned until 10 November 2021. Voting was held on 10 November 2021. Havlíček was disqualified from election as he was holding position in a government making him ineligible to run. Adamová was thus the only candidate. She received 102 votes thus winning the election.

Candidate	Party	Votes	
Markéta Pekarová Adamová	TOP 09	102 / 194	52.58
None		72 / 194	37.11
Against		20 / 200	10.31
