= Jaroslava Pokorná Jermanová =

Czech politician (born 1970)

Jaroslava Pokorná Jermanová MEP
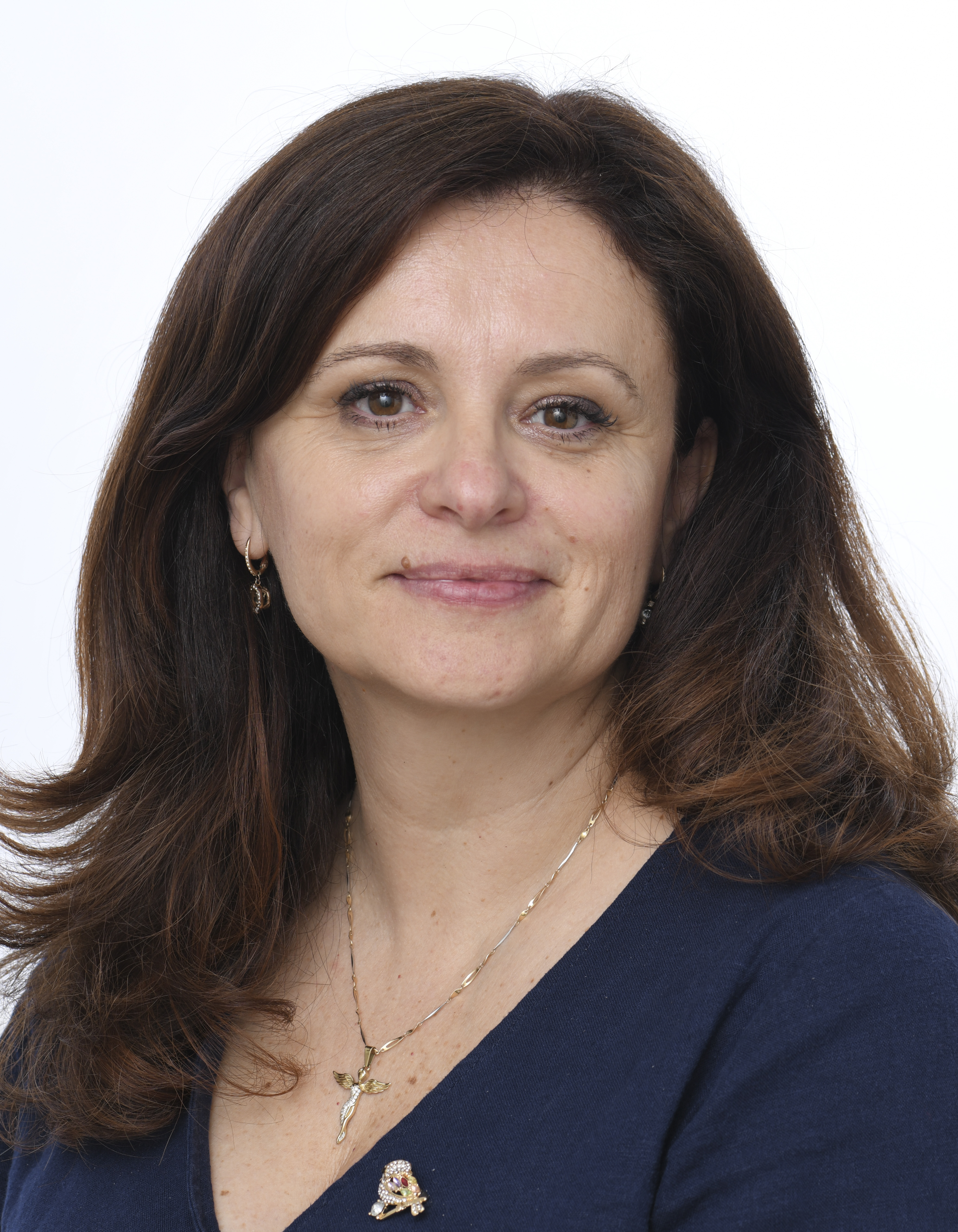

Member of the European Parliament
- Incumbent
- Assumed office 16 July 2024
- Constituency: Czech Republic

Governor of the Central Bohemian Region
- In office 18 November 2016 – 16 November 2020
- Preceded by: Miloš Petera
- Succeeded by: Petra Pecková

Member of the Chamber of Deputies
- In office 9 October 2021 – 28 June 2024
- Succeeded by: Miroslav Samaš
- In office 21 October 2017 – 24 November 2017
- In office 26 October 2013 – 3 January 2017

1st Deputy President of the Chamber of Deputies
- In office 27 November 2013 – 3 January 2017
- Preceded by: Lubomír Zaorálek
- Succeeded by: Radek Vondráček

Personal details
- Born: Jaroslava Jermanová; 17 August 1970 (age 56) Karlovy Vary, Czechoslovakia
- Party: ANO 2011 (since 2011); ODS (2004–2011)
- Other political affiliations: Patriots for Europe
- Education: Czech University of Life Sciences Prague

Jaroslava Pokorná Jermanová (née Jaroslava Jermanová; 17 August 1970) is a Czech politician of ANO 2011 who was elected member of the European Parliament in 2024.

== Early life and career ==
Pokorná Jermanová was born in Karlovy Vary on 17 August 1970. She studied operations and economics at Czech University of Life Sciences Prague, and worked in HR and as a manager.

== Political career ==
In the 1998 municipal elections she was elected councillor of Krhanice as an independent candidate. She became mayor following the 2002 elections, and joined the Civic Democratic Party in 2004. In the 2004 regional elections she was elected to the regional council of Central Bohemia. She left the Civic Democratic Party in 2011, and joined ANO 2011 in 2012.

Pokorná Jermanová was elected to the Chamber of Deputies in 2013, and served as first vice president of the chamber during her first term. In 2016 she was elected governor of the Central Bohemian Region by representatives from ODS, Mayors and Independents, and three TOP 09 members who defied the party leadership. She was elected to the European Parliament in 2024.
