= Milan Uhde =

Czech politician, poet and playwright

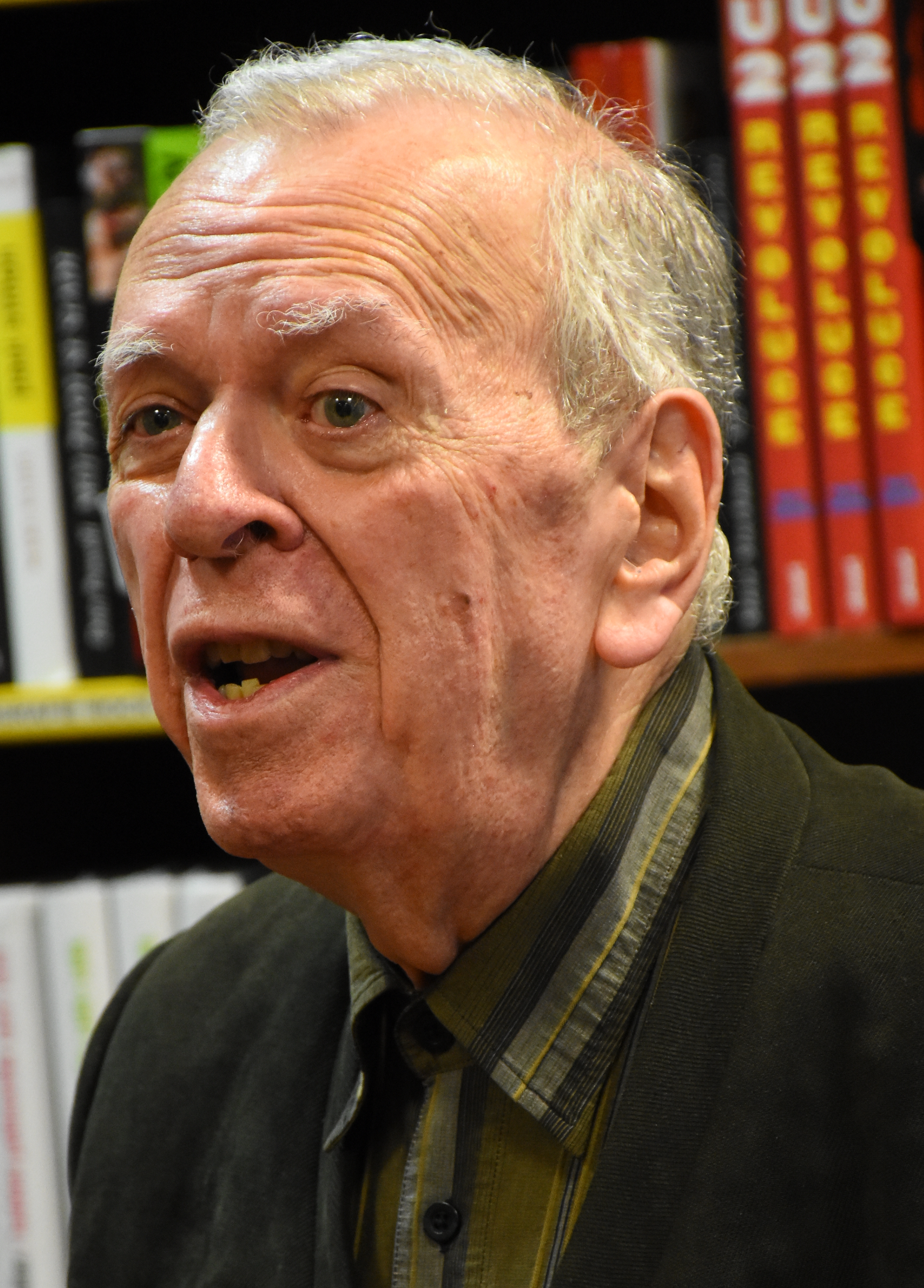
- Uhde in 2017

President of the Chamber of Deputies of the Czech Republic
- In office 1 January 1993 – 6 June 1996
- Preceded by: Position established
- Succeeded by: Miloš Zeman

Minister of Culture
- In office 29 June 1990 – 25 June 1992
- Prime Minister: Petr Pithart
- Preceded by: Milan Lukeš
- Succeeded by: Jindřich Kabát

Member of the Chamber of Deputies
- In office 1 January 1993 – 19 June 1998

Member of the Czech National Council
- In office 6 June 1992 – 31 December 1992

Leader of the Civic Democratic Party in the Chamber of Deputies
- In office 16 July 1996 – 9 June 1997
- Preceded by: Jiří Honajzer
- Succeeded by: Jiří Honajzer

Personal details
- Born: 28 July 1936 (age 90) Brno, Czechoslovakia
- Party: Civic Forum (1989–1991); ODS (1991–1998); US–DEU (1998–2010)
- Spouse: Zuzana Uhdeová
- Education: Masaryk University; JAMU

Milan Uhde (born 28 July 1936 in Brno) is a Czech playwright and politician. He was a member of the Civic Democratic Party.

Uhde previously worked at a literary journal, but the publication was banned in 1972. He signed the human rights Charter 77 which further worsened his relations with the authorities.

Uhde served in the Parliament of Czechoslovakia and the Czech National Council from 1990 until 1992. He was appointed Chairman in 1992. He also served as President of the Chamber of Deputies of the Czech Republic from 1993 to 1996. He returned to his writing career in 1998.

Political offices
New office	President of the Czech Chamber of Deputies; 1993–1996	Succeeded by Miloš Zeman
