= 2002 President of the Chamber of Deputies of the Parliament of the Czech Republic election =

2002 President of the Chamber of Deputies of the Parliament of the Czech Republic
- 11 July 2002

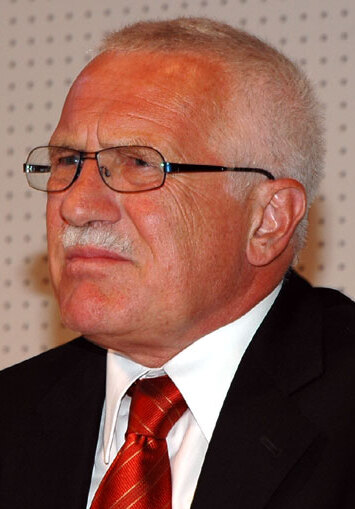
Candidate	Lubomír Zaorálek	Václav Klaus
Party	ČSSD	ODS
Popular vote	101	74
Percentage	57.71%	42.29%
President before election
Václav Klaus
ODS
Elected President
Lubomír Zaorálek
ČSSD

Lubomír Zaorálek was elected President of the Chamber of Deputies of the Parliament of the Czech Republic on 11 July 2002. .

== Background ==
After the Czech legislative election of 2002, a new President of the Chamber of Deputies was required. The 2002 legislative election resulted in a victory for the ČSSD who formed a coalition with KDU-ČSL and US-DEU. The coalition nominated Lubomír Zaorálek for the office of President. The incumbent President Václav Klaus did not intend to seek reelection because he considered it "a lost fight" but members of ODS persuaded him to participate to show the governing coalition that ODS was prepared to be a strong opposition.

== Voting and aftermath ==
No President was elected in the first round of voting as Zaorálek received 99 votes and Klaus received 76. The coalition government held 101 seats in the Chamber of Deputies indicating that two coalition MPs did not vote for Zaorálek. In the second round of voting, Zaorálek received 101 votes. Klaus congratulated him on the victory and said he respected the election results.
