= 2015 Freedom and Direct Democracy leadership election =

Czech political party leadership election

- 4 August 2015
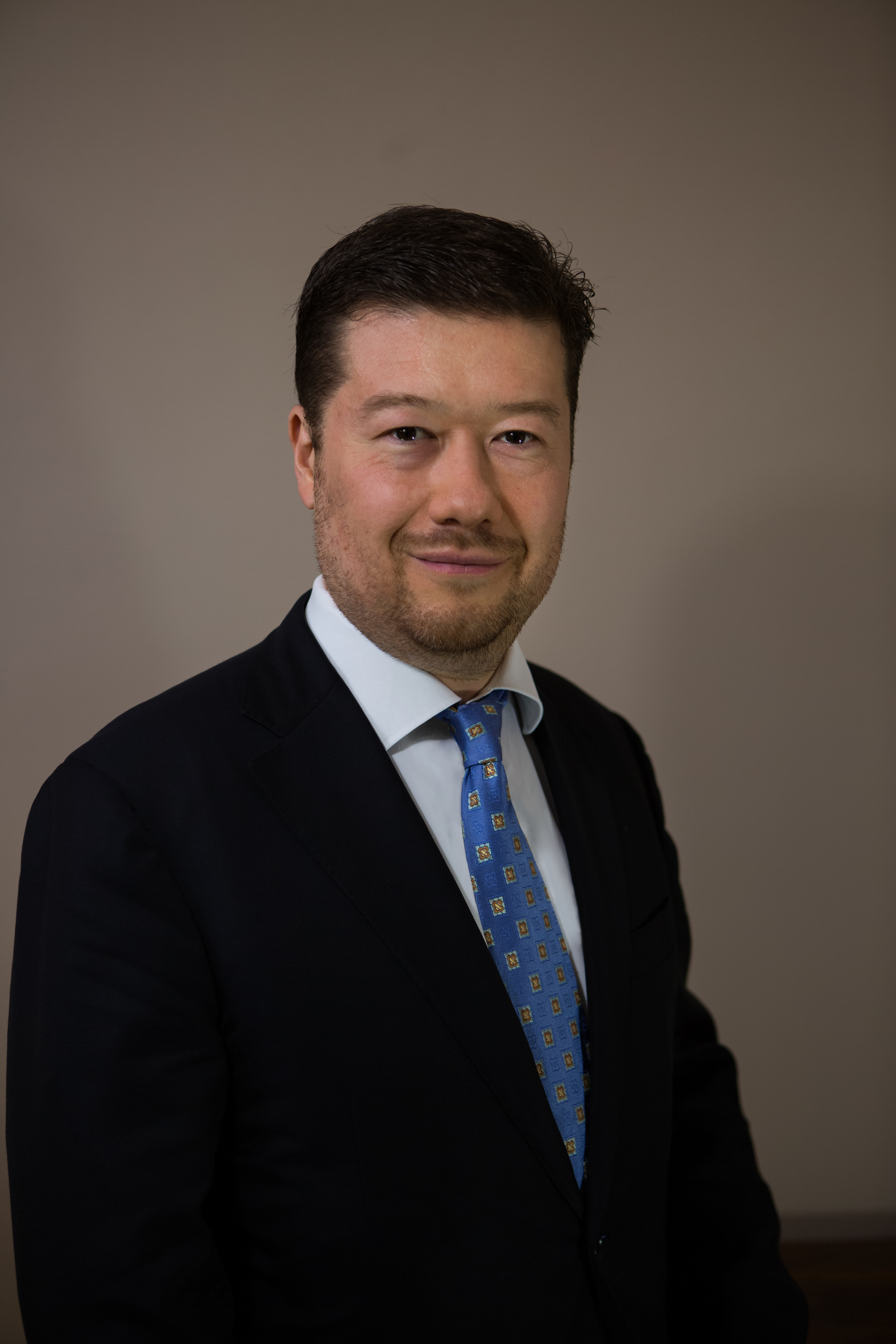
Candidate	Tomio Okamura
Elected leader of SPD
Tomio Okamura

The Freedom and Direct Democracy leadership election of 2015 was held on 4 August 2015. Tomio Okamura was elected the first leader of the party.

== Background ==
Tomio Okamura was the leader of Dawn of Direct Democracy but had to leave the party in early 2015 due to conflicts. Okamura then decided to form new party called Freedom and Direct Democracy. Leadership election was scheduled for August 2015.

== Voting ==
Voting took place on 4 August 2015. Okamura was the only candidate. He was reportedly elected the new leader but no reports of vote count were made public.
