= Hayato Okamura =

Czech politician

Hayato Okamura MP
- Okamura in 2023

Member of the Chamber of Deputies
- Incumbent
- Assumed office 9 October 2021

Personal details
- Born: 28 November 1966 (age 59) Prague, Czechoslovakia
- Party: KDU-ČSL (2015–present)
- Relatives: Tomio Okamura; Osamu Okamura
- Education: Charles University
- Occupation: translator; politician
- Website: hayatookamura.cz

Hayato Josef Okamura (Czech pronunciation: [ˈɦajato ˈokamura], born 28 November 1966) is a Czech–Japanese translator and politician. Since October 2021, he has been a member of the Chamber of Deputies of the Czech Republic (MP) for the KDU-ČSL.

Okamura has two younger brothers; Tomio Okamura is a politician, and Osamu Okamura is an architect and university teacher.

== See also ==
- Richard von Coudenhove-Kalergi – Tokyo-born Czechoslovak politician of Japanese descent, lived in Poběžovice, Czech lands.
