= Tomáš Petříček =

Czech politician (born 1981)

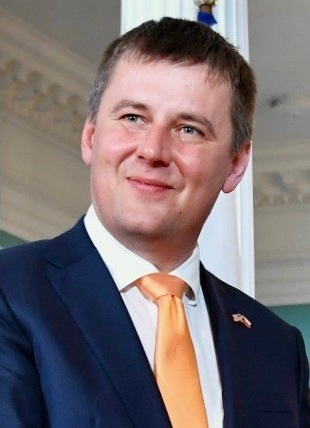
- Tomáš Petříček in February 2019

Minister of Foreign Affairs of the Czech Republic
- In office 16 October 2018 – 12 April 2021
- Prime Minister: Andrej Babiš
- Preceded by: Jan Hamáček
- Succeeded by: Jan Hamáček

Personal details
- Born: 27 September 1981 (age 45) Rokycany, Czechoslovak Socialist Republic (now Czech Republic)
- Party: Social Democracy (2005–2024)
- Education: Charles University in Prague; University of Warwick
- Scientific career
- Thesis: Energy security perspectives of the European Union (2014)

Tomáš Petříček (born 27 September 1981) is a Czech politician who served as Minister of Foreign Affairs from October 2018 to April 2021. He served as Deputy Minister of Foreign Affairs between August and October 2018, then Deputy Minister of Labor and Social Affairs from May until December 2017.

== Political career ==
=== Early political career ===
Petříček went through the ranks of the Young Social Democrats. He became a political officer of the foreign department of the ČSSD and its head, respectively in 2005 and 2006.

Between 2007 and 2009, Petříček was assistant to Libor Rouček, Member of the European Parliament. From 2014 until 2017, he served as an adviser to MEP Miroslav Poche. Petříček was also involved in the preparation of this party's campaign in 2016 Czech regional election. Later, Petříček worked at the Prague City Hall, where he was in charge of European funds in the council's council, and served on the supervisory boards and boards of several companies.

=== Minister of Labor and Social Affairs ===
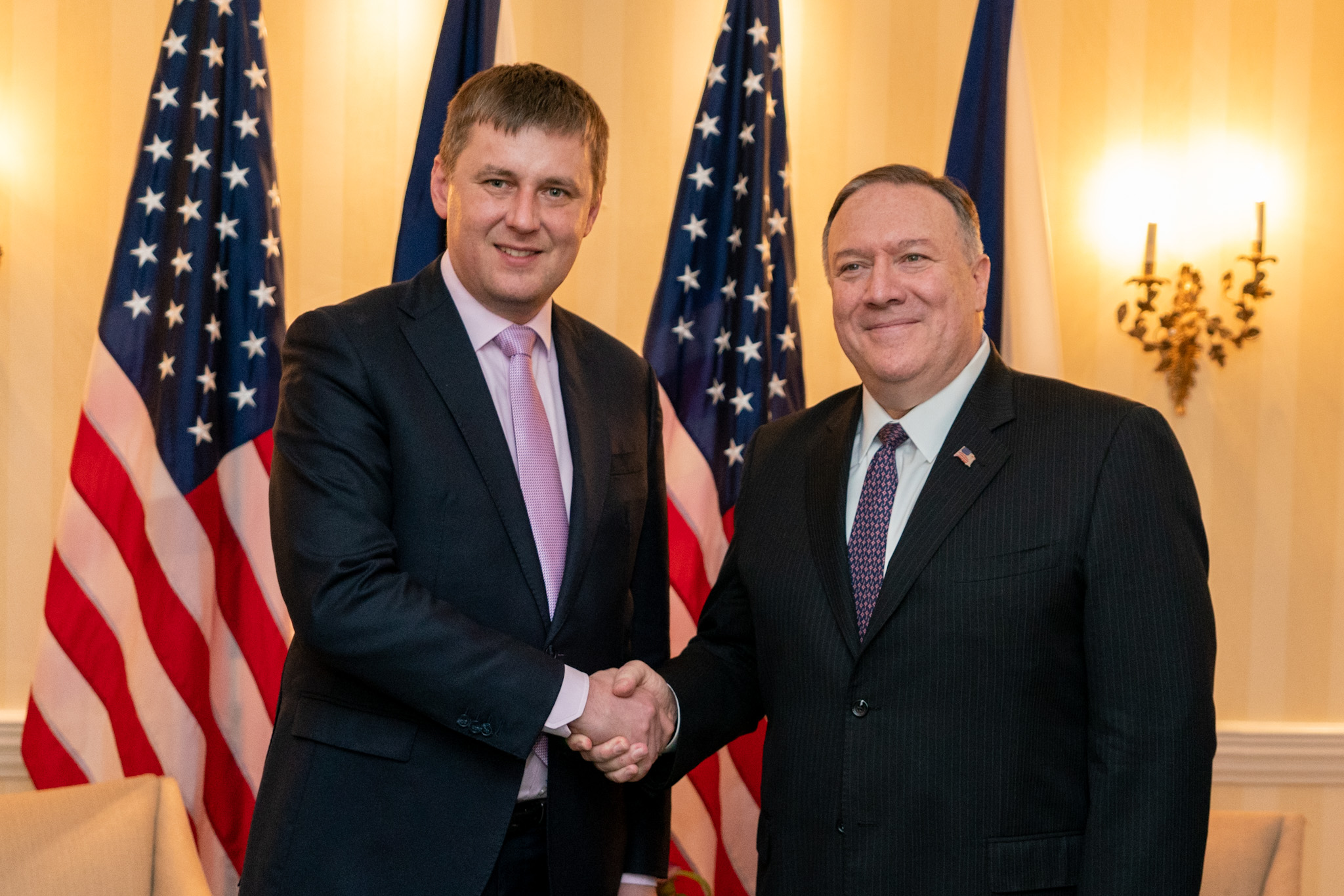
Petricek meets with U.S. Secretary of State Michael R. Pompeo in Munich, Germany on February 14, 2020.

In May 2017, Petříček was appointed political deputy minister of labor and social affairs of the Czech Republic Michaela Marksová in the Cabinet of Bohuslav Sobotka. He actively supported Petr Dolínek against Miloslav Ludvík in deciding on the position of the leading ČSSD candidate for the 2017 Czech legislative election.

In the 2018 Czech municipal elections, Petříček was the leading ČSSD candidate for the Prague 7 City Council, thus becoming the party's candidate for mayor of this district. However, he failed to be elected to the city council.

=== Minister of Foreign Affairs ===
At the beginning of October 2018, Miloš Zeman appointed Petříček as Minister of Foreign Affairs. Petříček became the fifteenth member of Second Cabinet of Andrej Babiš, formed by the coalition entities ANO and ČSSD.

== Foreign policy positions ==
=== China ===
At the end of 2018, Petříček met Chinese Minister of Foreign Affairs Wang Yi to discuss intergovernmental commission that would improve China-Czech Republic relations. During the meeting with Chinese officials, Petříček did not want to elaborate on the issue of labor camps in Xinjiang, in which the Chinese government interned more than a million minority Uyghurs. In January 2020, he stated that "we need to talk with China and are interested in developing economic relations".

=== Middle East ===
Petříček criticised the Assassination of Jamal Khashoggi, wanting a stronger EU stance on the event at the Council of Foreign Ministers. He supported the Iran nuclear deal.

In November 2018, Petříček went on a two-day visit to Israel and spread criticism regarding the Israeli annexation on East Jerusalem, which Palestinians claimed as the capital of the State of Palestine.

During a visit to Palestine in July 2019, Petříček assured the Palestinians that the Czech Republic would not recognise Jerusalem as the capital of Israel.

== Personal life ==
Apart from his native Czech, Petříček speaks English, French, and Spanish. Petříček has a daughter and son with his wife, Iva, whom he met during his studies.
