= Miloslav Vlček =

Czech politician

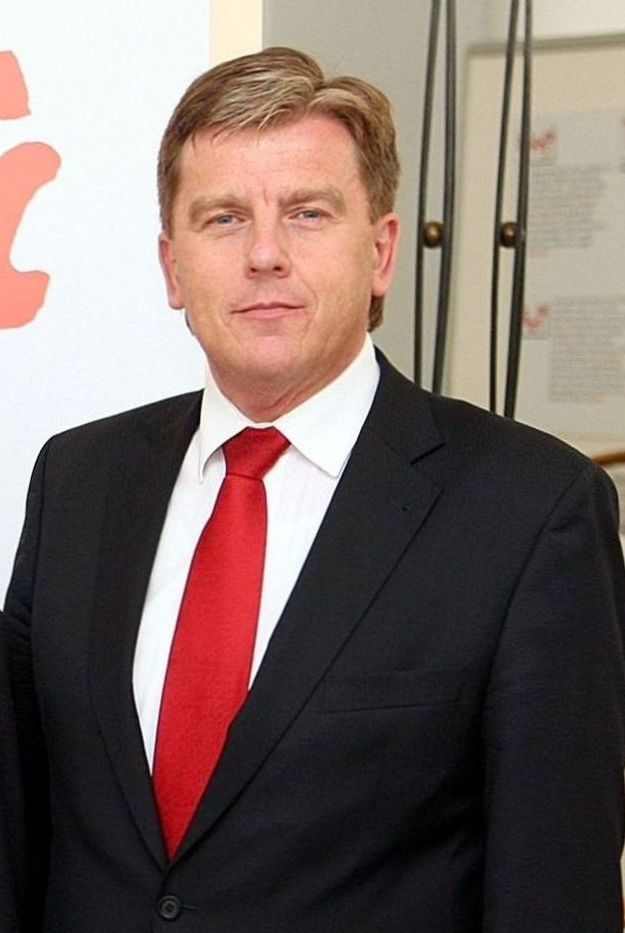

President of the Chamber of Deputies of the Czech Republic
- In office 14 August 2006 – 30 April 2010
- Preceded by: Lubomír Zaorálek
- Succeeded by: Miroslava Němcová

Member of the Chamber of Deputies
- In office 1 June 1996 – 30 April 2010

Personal details
- Born: 1 February 1961 (age 65) Konice, Czechoslovakia
- Party: ČSSD
- Spouse: Soňa Vlčková

Miloslav Vlček (born 1 February 1961) is a Czech politician who was the Member of the Czech Chamber of Deputies (MP) from 1996 to 2010. Between the years 2006 and 2010, he served as the President of the Chamber of Deputies. He resigned the presidentship in April 2010, due to his involvement in a financial scandal.
