= Radek Vondráček =

Czech politician

Radek Vondráček MP
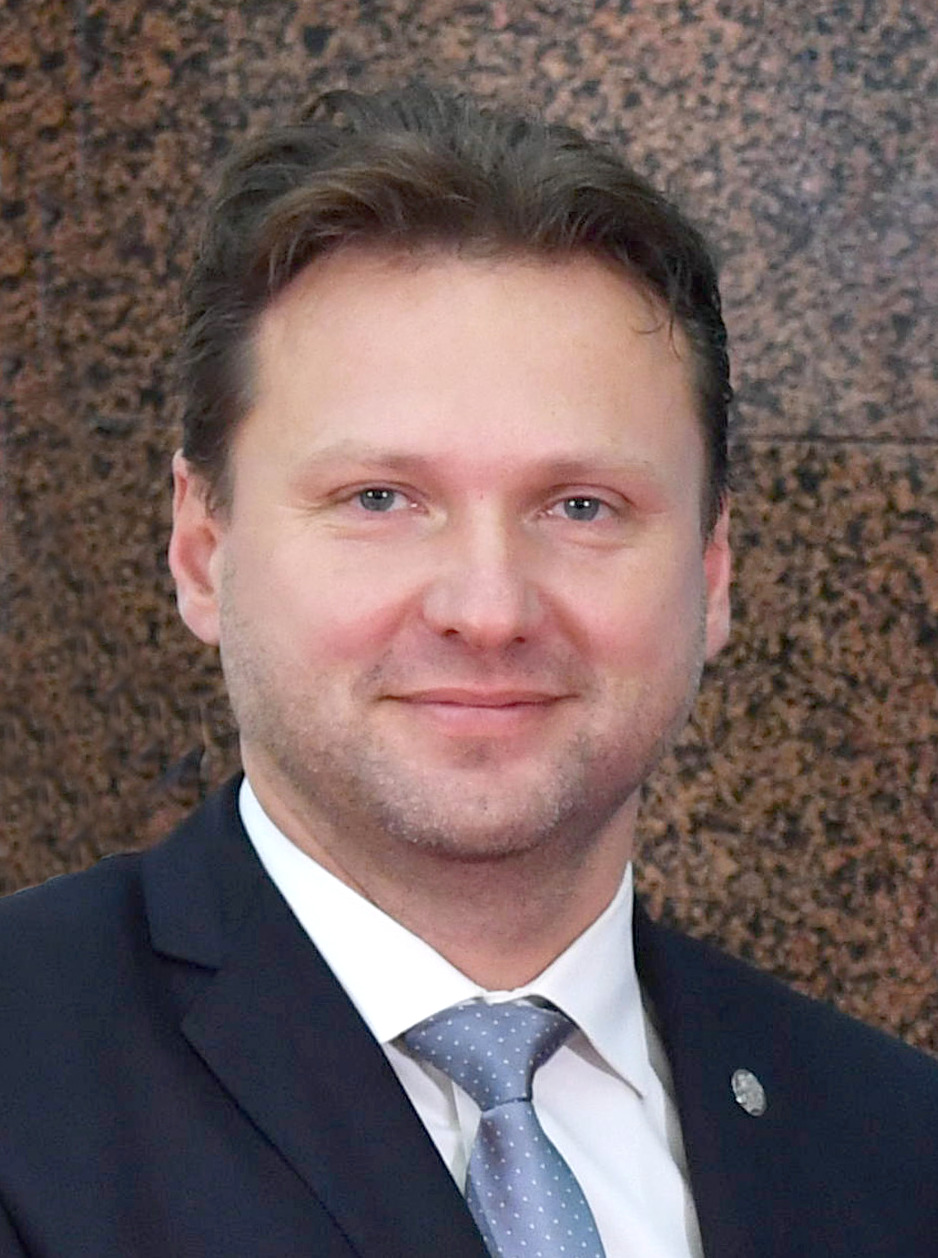

8th President of the Chamber of Deputies
- In office 22 November 2017 – 21 October 2021
- Preceded by: Jan Hamáček
- Succeeded by: Markéta Pekarová Adamová

1st Deputy President of the Chamber of Deputies
- In office 11 January 2017 – 26 October 2017
- Preceded by: Jaroslava Pokorná Jermanová
- Succeeded by: Jan Hamáček

Member of the Chamber of Deputies
- Incumbent
- Assumed office 26 October 2013

Personal details
- Born: 30 December 1973 (age 52) Kroměříž, Czechoslovakia (now Czech Republic)
- Party: ANO 2011
- Education: Masaryk University in Brno
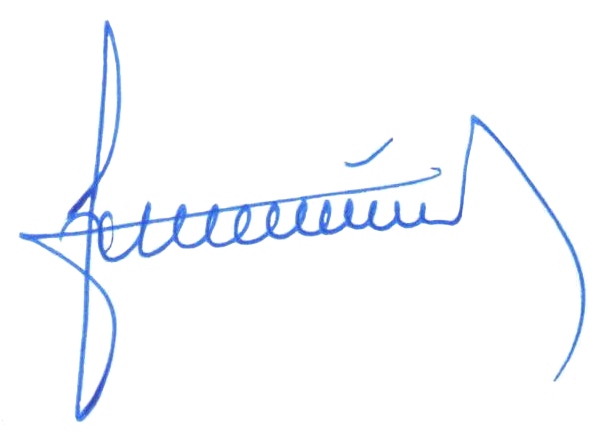
- Signature

Radek Vondráček (born 30 December 1973) is a Czech lawyer and politician who served as President of the Chamber of Deputies of the Czech Republic from 2017 to 2021. He previously served as First Deputy President of the Chamber of Deputies from January 2017 to October 2017. Vondráček was first elected Member of the Chamber of Deputies (MP) in 2013 and was re-elected at the 2017, 2021, and 2025 elections. Vondráček is member of the movement ANO 2011.

Vondráček owns a Glock pistol and is authorized to carry it for protection.
