= Jan Hamáček =

Czech politician

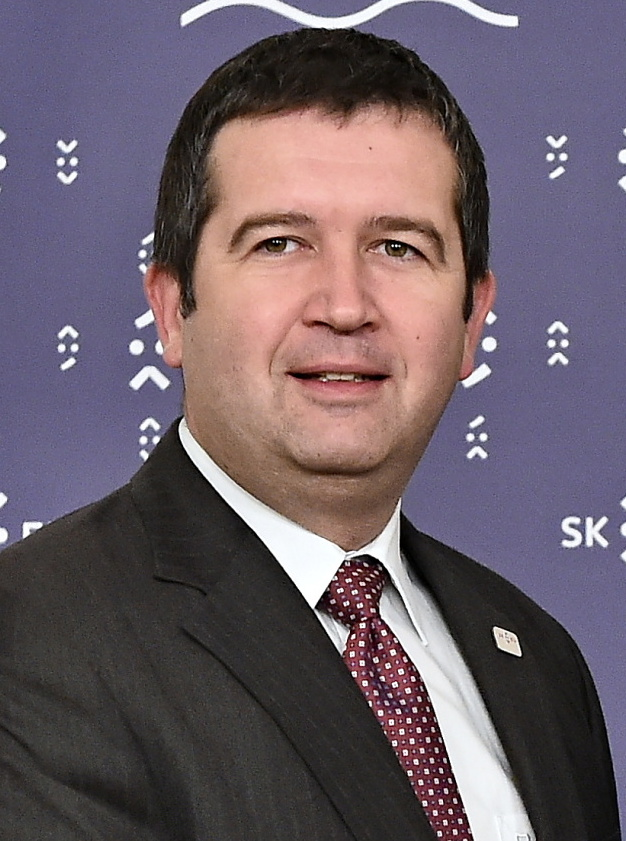

Leader of the Social Democratic Party
- In office 18 February 2018 – 25 October 2021
- Preceded by: Milan Chovanec
- Succeeded by: Michal Šmarda

First Deputy Prime Minister of the Czech Republic
- In office 27 June 2018 – 17 December 2021
- Prime Minister: Andrej Babiš
- Preceded by: Richard Brabec (2017)
- Succeeded by: Vít Rakušan

Minister of the Interior
- In office 27 June 2018 – 17 December 2021
- Prime Minister: Andrej Babiš
- Preceded by: Lubomír Metnar
- Succeeded by: Vít Rakušan

Minister of Foreign Affairs Acting
- In office 12 April 2021 – 21 April 2021
- Prime Minister: Andrej Babiš
- Preceded by: Tomáš Petříček
- Succeeded by: Jakub Kulhánek
- In office 27 June 2018 – 16 October 2018
- Prime Minister: Andrej Babiš
- Preceded by: Martin Stropnický
- Succeeded by: Tomáš Petříček

President of the Chamber of Deputies
- In office 27 November 2013 – 22 November 2017
- Preceded by: Miroslava Němcová
- Succeeded by: Radek Vondráček

1st Deputy President of the Chamber of Deputies
- In office 24 November 2017 – 27 June 2018
- Preceded by: Radek Vondráček
- Succeeded by: Vojtěch Filip

Member of the Chamber of Deputies
- In office 3 June 2006 – 21 October 2021

Personal details
- Born: 4 November 1978 (age 47) Mladá Boleslav, Czechoslovakia
- Party: Social Democracy (2001–2024)
- Children: Lukáš; Matyáš

Jan Hamáček (born 4 November 1978) is a Czech politician who was leader of the Czech Social Democratic Party (ČSSD) from February 2018 until October 2021, and minister of the Interior from June 2018 to December 2021. He also served as the President of the Chamber of Deputies from 2013 to 2017, and was acting minister of Foreign Affairs from June to October 2018 and from 12 to 21 April 2021. Hamáček was a member of the Chamber of Deputies from 2006 to 2021.

== Political career ==
Prior to his election to parliament, Hamáček worked as an adviser to two prime ministers, and as his party's International Secretary.

Hamáček was first elected to the Chamber of Deputies in the 2006 elections. During his time in parliament, he has held the position of Vice-Chairman of the Committee on Foreign Affairs, headed the Czech delegation to the NATO Parliamentary Assembly and served on the Committee on European Affairs.

Hamáček became the leader of ČSSD in March 2018. In Andrej Babis' Second Cabinet, sworn in during June 2018, he was named Minister of the Interior, and also served as acting Minister of Foreign Affairs from June to October 2018. Miroslav Poche was originally nominated to be the minister, but due to President Miloš Zeman's refusal to swear him in, Hamáček was made acting foreign minister until the situation could be resolved. On 16 October 2018, Tomáš Petříček was named the new Minister of Foreign Affairs.

In August 2018, Hamáček helped negotiate the release of two workers from a German humanitarian group in Syria, and traveled to Damascus for the handover of the workers; the Czech Republic is the only country in Europe that maintains diplomatic relations with Syria.

In 2021, Seznam Zprávy reported that Hamáček was considering negotiating with Russia not to disclose evidence of Russia's involvement in the 2014 Vrbětice ammunition warehouses explosions in exchange for 1 million doses of Sputnik V vaccine. Hamáček denied the accusation and said that he intended to sue the media outlet. The journalist, Janek Kroupa, said that he had an audio recording.

After ČSSD's poor performance in the 2021 Czech legislative election, in which the party failed to meet the 5% voting threshold, Hamáček resigned as leader of the party. He left the party in June 2024, following another poor performance in the 2024 European Parliament election.

== Other activities ==
He is a Senior Network Member at the European Leadership Network (ELN).

Party political offices
Preceded by Milan Chovanec	Leader of the Social Democratic Party; 2018–2021	Succeeded by Michal Šmarda
