= Miroslava Němcová =

Czech politician

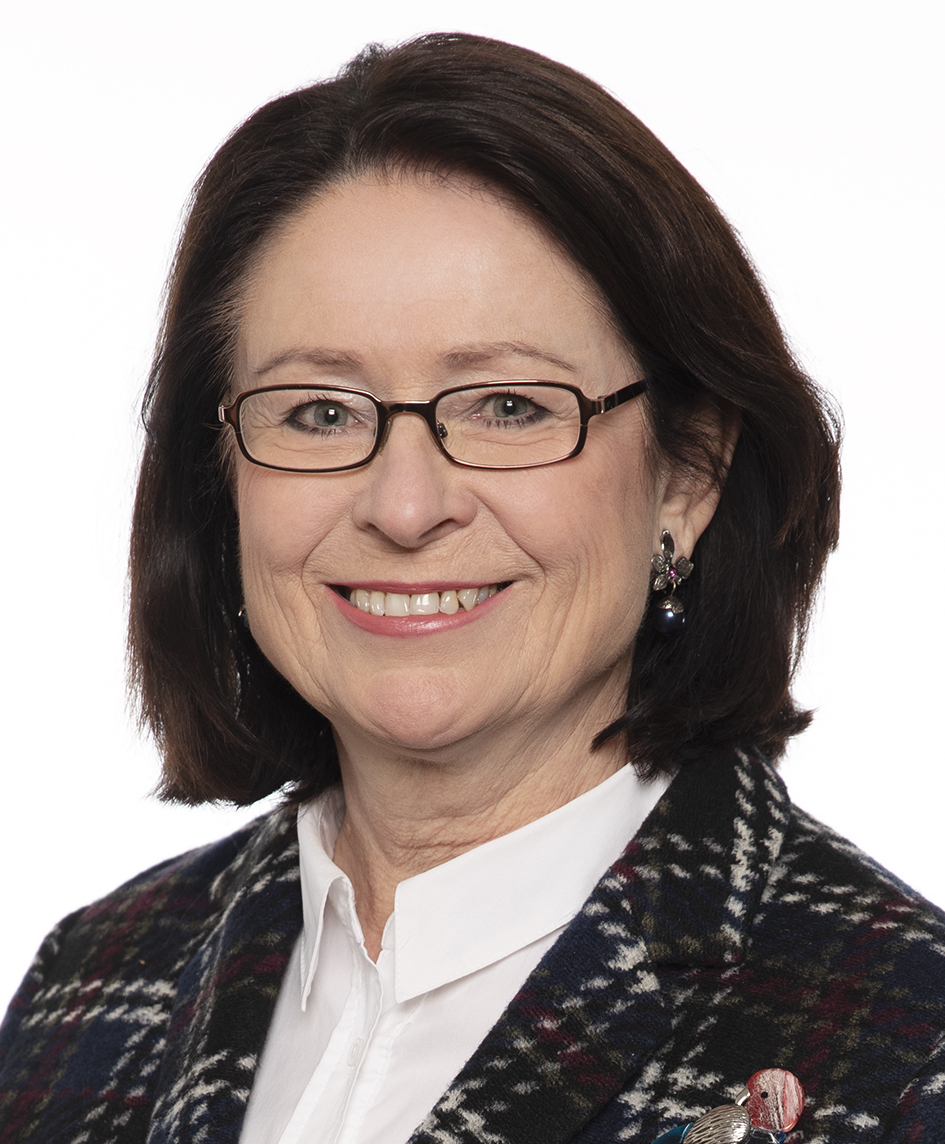
- Official portrait, 2020

President of the Chamber of Deputies of the Czech Republic
- In office 24 June 2010 – 28 August 2013
- Preceded by: Miloslav Vlček
- Succeeded by: Jan Hamáček

Senator from Prague 1
- In office 10 October 2020 – 10 October 2026
- Preceded by: Václav Hampl
- Succeeded by: Jiří Padevět

Member of the Chamber of Deputies
- In office 20 June 1998 – 18 October 2020

1st Deputy President of the Chamber of Deputies
- In office 14 August 2006 – 3 June 2010
- Preceded by: Jan Kasal
- Succeeded by: Lubomír Zaorálek

Personal details
- Born: Miroslava Daňková; 17 November 1952 (age 73) Nové Město na Moravě, Czechoslovakia (now Czech Republic)
- Party: Civic Democratic Party (since 1992)
- Spouse: Vladimír Němec
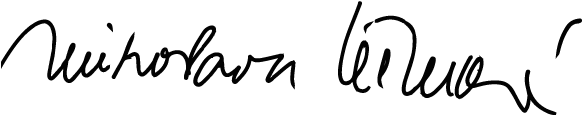
- Signature

Miroslava Němcová (née Daňková; born 17 November 1952) is a Czech politician who served as 6th President of the Chamber of Deputies of the Czech Republic from 2010 to 2013. She was a member of the Chamber of Deputies from 1998 to 2020. In 2020 she ran for Senate in Prague 1. She faced the incumbent Václav Hampl whom she defeated by a large margin and became a member of the Senate.

She also ran for leadership of the Civic Democratic Party (ODS) in 2002 and 2014 but was unsuccessful.

On 17 January 2025, Němcová announced that she would not seek reelection as Senator.

Political offices
Preceded by Miloslav Vlček	President of the Czech Chamber of Deputies; 2010–2013	Succeeded by Jan Hamáček
