= Lubomír Zaorálek =

Czech politician

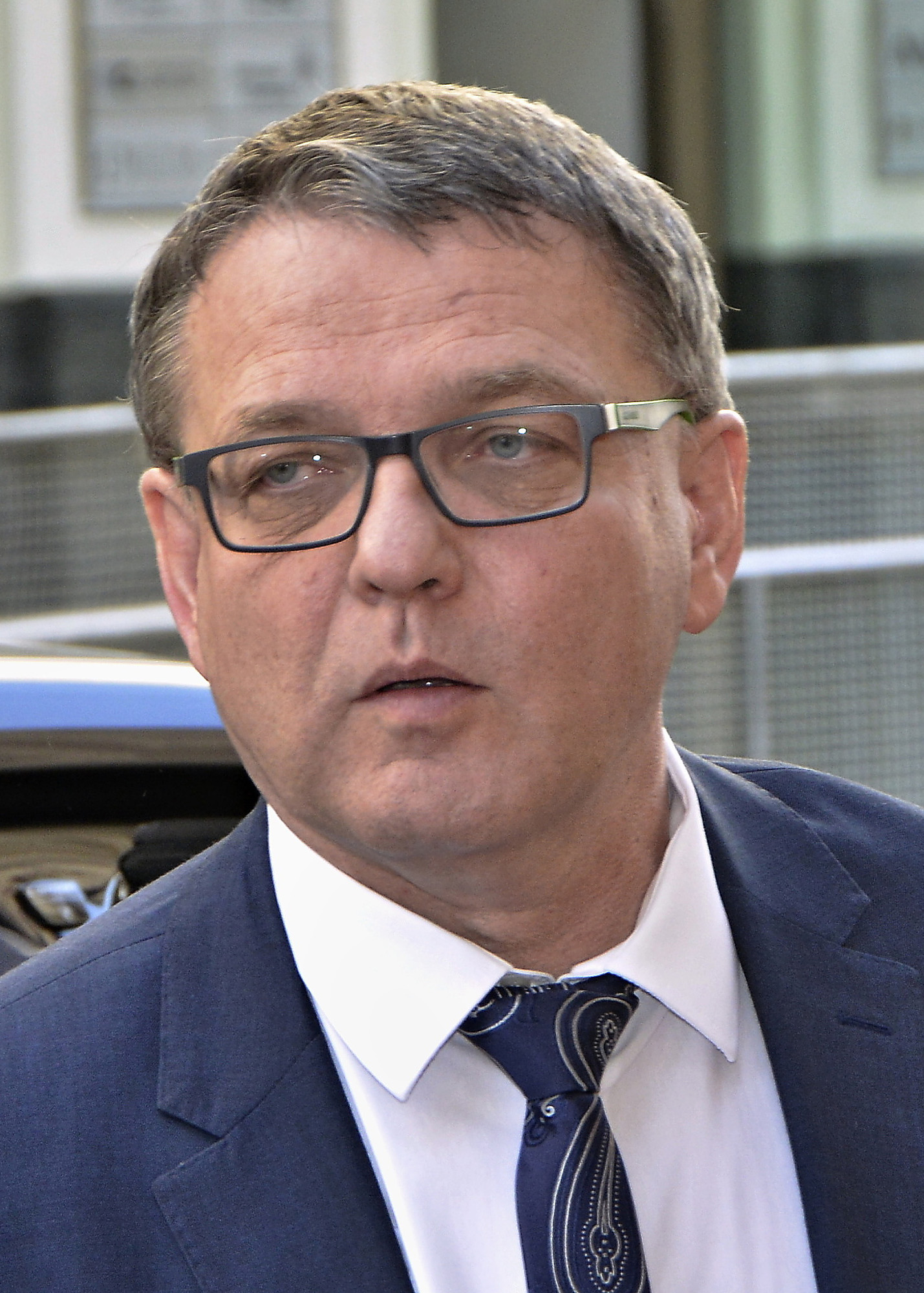
- Zaorálek in 2016

Minister of Culture
- In office 28 August 2019 – 17 December 2021
- Prime Minister: Andrej Babiš
- Preceded by: Antonín Staněk
- Succeeded by: Martin Baxa

Minister of Foreign Affairs
- In office 29 January 2014 – 13 December 2017
- Prime Minister: Bohuslav Sobotka
- Preceded by: Jan Kohout
- Succeeded by: Martin Stropnický

President of the Chamber of Deputies
- In office 11 July 2002 – 14 August 2006
- Preceded by: Václav Klaus
- Succeeded by: Miloslav Vlček

1st Deputy President of the Chamber of Deputies
- In office 24 June 2010 – 28 August 2013
- Preceded by: Miroslava Němcová
- Succeeded by: Jaroslava Pokorná Jermanová

Member of the Chamber of Deputies
- In office 1 June 1996 – 21 October 2021

Personal details
- Born: 6 September 1956 (age 70) Ostrava, Czechoslovakia (now Czech Republic)
- Party: Socialist Party (1986–1989); Civic Forum (1990–1991); Civic Movement (1991–1994); Social Democratic Party (1994–present)
- Other political affiliations: National Front (1986–1989); Stačilo! (2025)
- Education: Masaryk University

Lubomír Zaorálek (born 6 September 1956) is a Czech politician, who served as the Minister of Foreign Affairs under Prime Minister Bohuslav Sobotka from 2014 to 2017, and Minister of Culture under Prime Minister Andrej Babiš from 2019 to 2021. He was a member of the Chamber of Deputies (MP) from 1996 to 2021, and was the election leader for the Social Democratic Party in the 2017 election, when their vote share dropped to 7%.

== Early life ==
He was born on 6 September 1956 in Ostrava, and graduated from Jan Evangelista Purkyně University (today Masaryk University) in Brno in 1982. He worked as a dramaturge at Czechoslovak Television in Ostrava.

== Political career ==
During the Velvet Revolution in November 1989 he participated in Civic Forum.

Zaorálek was first elected to the Chamber of Deputies in 1996 as a member of the Czech Social Democratic Party (ČSSD), becoming the party's vice chairman in 2009. From 2002 to 2006, he was the President of the Chamber of Deputies.

He served as Minister of Foreign Affairs from 2014 to 2017 in the Cabinet of Prime Minister Bohuslav Sobotka, and then as Minister of Culture in the Cabiner of Prime Minister Andrej Babis from 2019 to 2021. He lost his seat in the Chamber of Deputies when ČSSD failed to qualify to enter parliament at the 2021 general election.

== See also ==
- List of foreign ministers in 2017
- List of current foreign ministers

Political offices
Preceded by Václav Klaus	President of the Chamber of Deputies; 2002–2006	Succeeded by Miloslav Vlček
Preceded by Jan Kohout	Minister of Foreign Affairs; 2014–2017	Succeeded by Martin Stropnický
Preceded by Antonín Staněk	Minister of Culture; 2019–2021	Succeeded by Martin Baxa
