= Ministry of Culture (Czech Republic) =

Government ministry

Ministry of Culture Czech Republic
- Ministerstvo kultury České republiky

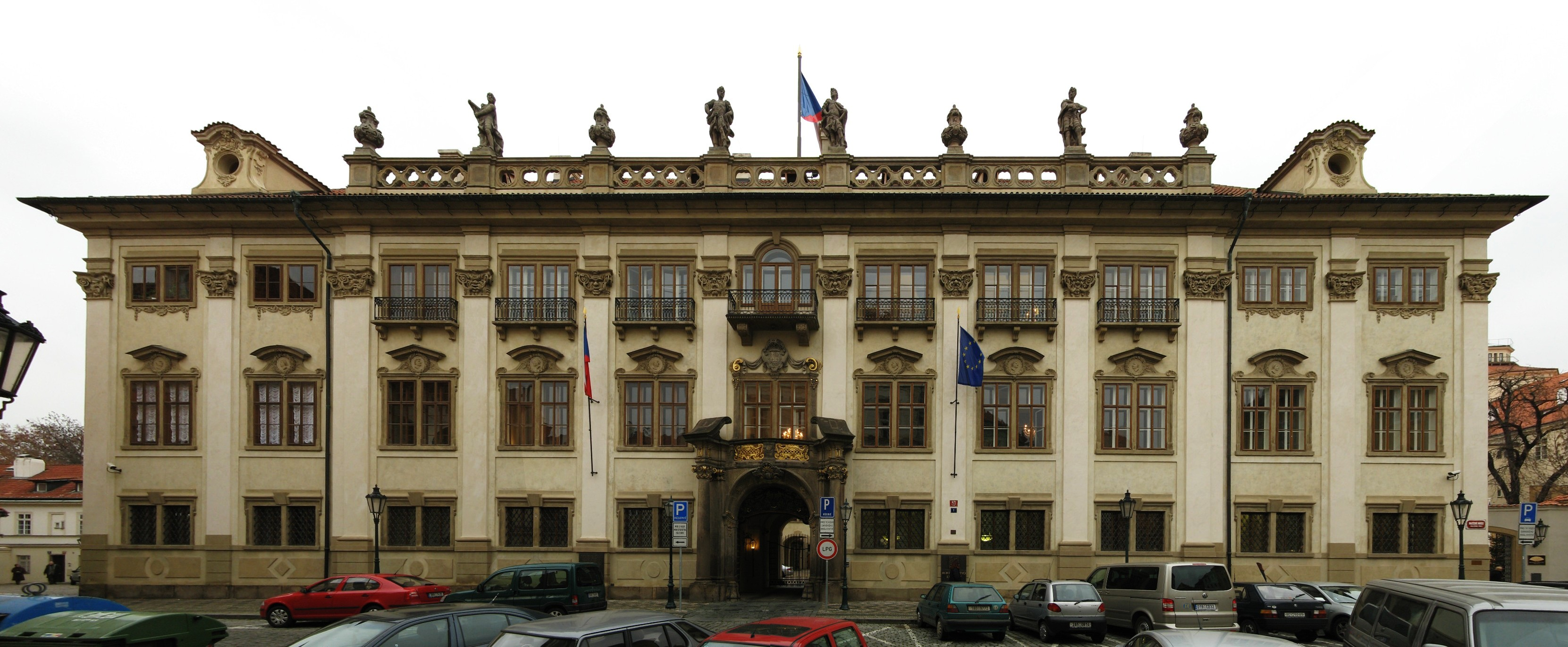

Agency overview
- Formed: 1969
- Headquarters: Nostický palác, Maltézské náměstí 1, 118 11 Prague 1 (Malá Strana); 50°5′7.66″N 14°24′20.96″E
- Agency executive: Oto Klempíř, Minister of Culture
- Website: mk.gov.cz/

The Ministry of Culture (Czech language: Ministerstvo kultury České republiky) of the Czech Republic was established in 1969.

== See also ==
- Ministry of Culture
