= President of the Chamber of Deputies (Czech Republic) =

President of the Chamber of Deputies Předseda Poslanecké sněmovny
- Seal of the Chamber of Deputies of the Czech Republic

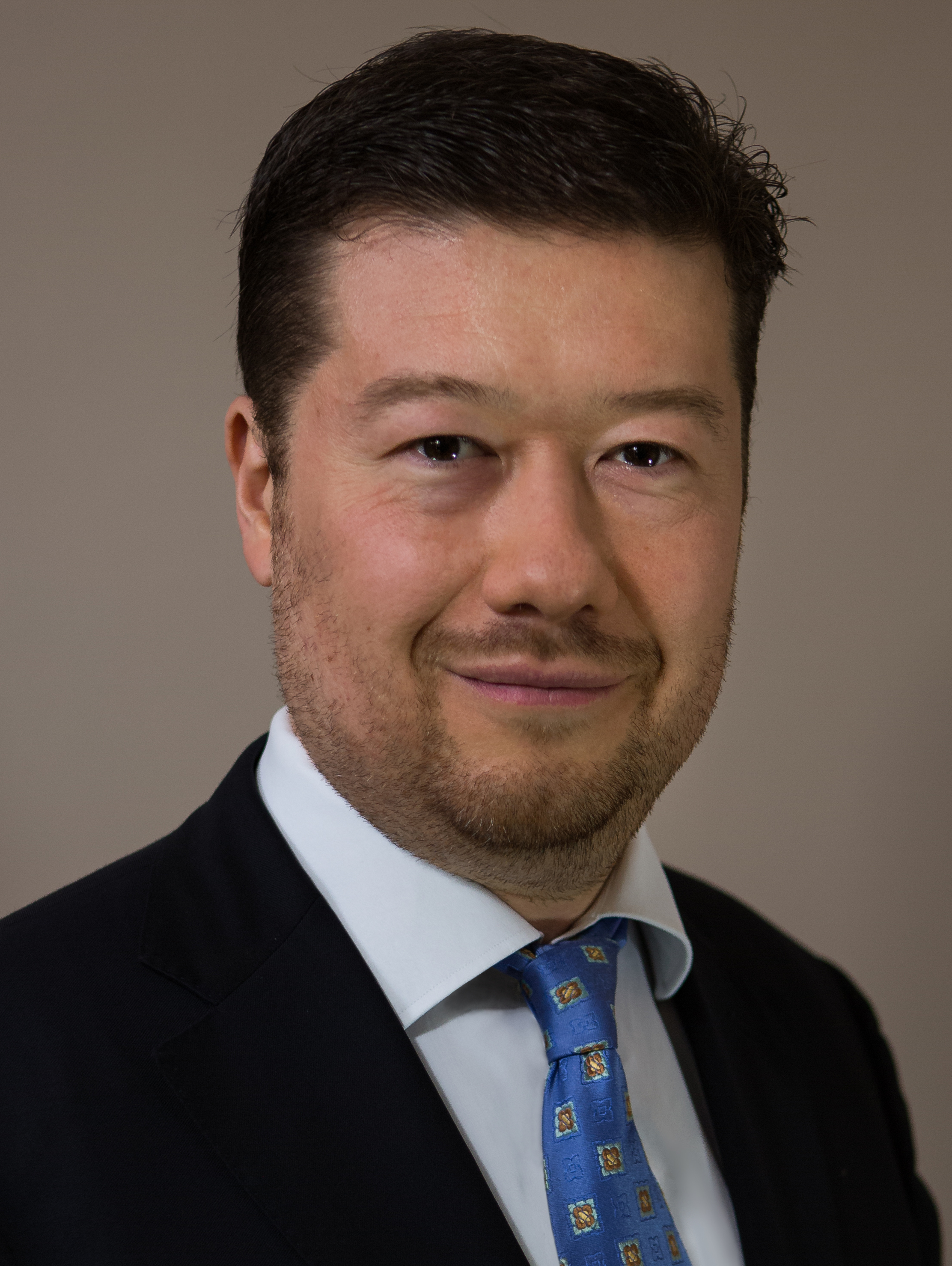
- Incumbent; Tomio Okamura since 5 November 2025
- Appointer: Chamber of Deputies of the Parliament of the Czech Republic
- Formation: January 1, 1993; 33 years ago
- First holder: Milan Uhde
- Website: www.psp.cz

The president of the Chamber of Deputies of the Parliament of the Czech Republic (Czech: Předseda Poslanecké sněmovny Parlamentu České republiky), sometimes also referred to as speaker or chairman / chairwoman, is the elected presiding officer of the Chamber of Deputies of the Czech Republic. Since 5 November 2025, the president has been Tomio Okamura of SPD.

== Responsibilities ==
The president shall:

- Represent the Chamber of Deputies in external affairs
- Nominate the Prime Minister to be appointed by the President of the republic in compliance with the second sentence of Section 4, Article 68 of the Constitution
- Accept the oath of the members of the Supreme Audit Office
- Forward all draft bills and all drafts of international treaties that have to be approved by the Parliament to the Senate after their passing/ratification by the Chamber of Deputies
- Forward all passed bills to the President of the republic for signing
- Forward all passed bills to the Prime Minister for signing
- Sign the acts of law and declarations adopted by the Chamber of Deputies and/or other documents issued by the Chamber of Deputies
- Call an alternate member if a mandate becomes vacant and issue a certificate verifying that the alternate has become a deputy
- Approve the extradition of any Deputy caught in the course of a criminal offence or immediately afterwards
- Specify the order, in which the vice-presidents of the Chamber of Deputies are entitled to deputise
- Summon, open and close the meetings of the Chamber of Deputies and the joint meetings of the Chamber of Deputies and the Senate
- Summon the Chamber of Deputies before the agreed date if it is in recess
- Interrupt the meetings of the Chamber of Deputies in the event of disruptions or if the Chamber of Deputies does not constitute a quorum
- Appoint and recall the Secretary General

== See also ==
- List of presidents of the Chamber of Deputies (Czech Republic)
