= Tomio Okamura =

President of the Chamber of Deputies of the Czech Republic since 2025

Tomio Okamura MP
- 岡村 富夫
- Okamura in 2025

President of the Chamber of Deputies
- Incumbent
- Assumed office 5 November 2025
- Preceded by: Markéta Pekarová Adamová

Leader of Freedom and Direct Democracy
- Incumbent
- Assumed office 4 August 2015
- Preceded by: Position established

Leader of Dawn of Direct Democracy
- In office 1 July 2013 – 5 May 2015
- Preceded by: Position established
- Succeeded by: Marek Černoch

Member of the Chamber of Deputies
- Incumbent
- Assumed office 26 October 2013
- Constituency: Central Bohemian

Senator from Zlín
- In office 20 October 2012 – 26 October 2013
- Preceded by: Jana Juřenčáková
- Succeeded by: Patrik Kunčar

Personal details
- Born: 4 July 1972 (age 54) Tokyo, Japan
- Party: SPD (2015–present)
- Other political affiliations: Independent (until 2013); Dawn (2013–2015)
- Children: 1
- Relatives: Hayato Okamura (brother); Osamu Okamura (brother)
- Website: www.tomio.cz

Tomio Okamura (岡村 富夫, Okamura Tomio; born 4 July 1972) is a Japanese-born Czech far-right politician and entrepreneur who has served as president of the Chamber of Deputies since November 2025. Okamura was the founder of the political parties Dawn of Direct Democracy and Freedom and Direct Democracy (SPD). He has been a member of the Chamber of Deputies since 2013. Okamura served in the Senate representing Zlín from 2012 to 2013.

== Early life and background ==
Okamura was born in Tokyo, Japan. His mother Helena (née Holíková) is a native of Moravian Wallachia and moved to Tokyo in 1966 following her marriage to Okamura's half-Japanese, half-Korean father, Matsu Okamura. Tomio Okamura lived in Japan for the first ten years of his life before his mother returned with her sons to Czechoslovakia. He spent a part of his childhood in a children's home in Mašťov in the Ústí nad Labem Region, where he says he was bullied and had a stutter until the age of 22. After leaving primary school he went on to study chemistry.

During his childhood he worked as a popcorn seller at a cinema in Japan.

== Business career ==
Okamura started his business career in 1994, focused mainly on the travel and gastronomy industries. He also started publishing a quarterly Pivní magazín ("Beer Magazine"). He is the author or co-author of several books. His book Tomio Okamura – Český sen ("Tomio Okamura – The Czech Dream") became a top 10 bestseller in the Czech Republic in 2010. In Spring 2011 his second book Umění vládnout ("The Art of Governance") was published. In 2012 he wrote a book Umění žít ("The Art of Living"). In 2013, he wrote two books – Umění přímé demokracie ("The Art of Direct Democracy") and Velká japonská kuchařka ("The Great Japanese Cookbook").

Okamura has links with a number of businesses including the Association of Czech Travel Agencies (Czech: Asociace českých cestovních kanceláří a agentur, AČCKA), where he was spokesman and vice-president. Other businesses Okamura has run include travel agent Miki travel and food shop Japa.

Okamura was a judge on Den D, the Czech version of British television programme Dragons' Den, for three series between 2009 and 2010.

== Political career ==
=== Member of the Senate ===
In June 2012, Okamura, known previously as an advocate of direct democracy, announced his candidacy for the 2012 Czech Senate election as an independent candidate in Zlín. In the October election, Okamura led after the first round with 30% of the vote. Okamura won in a run-off against Stanislav Mišák, taking 66% of the vote and winning a seat in the Senate on 20 October 2012.

In February 2013 Okamura was among a group of senators to sign a proposal to prosecute president Václav Klaus for high treason, regarding the amnesty announced by Klaus on finishing his term. The proposal was rejected by the Constitutional Court of the Czech Republic. Okamura also supported the constitutional amendment to abolish lifelong immunity for public officials. His senatorial term expired on his election to the Chamber of Deputies, after he had served in the Senate for one year and six days.

=== 2013 presidential campaign ===
Immediately following his election to the Senate, Okamura announced his intention to stand in the 2013 presidential election. Okamura's campaign submitted a list of 61,500 signatures. However, on 23 November 2012, the Ministry of Interior announced that only 35,750 signatures could be validated, and his candidacy was therefore refused. He appealed to the Supreme Administrative Court, which ruled that the Ministry of Interior had made an error while counting the signatures; however, even after correcting the error he did not obtain the required number of valid signatures. Okamura appealed to the Ministry to re-calculate the signatures individually, rather than by estimation, but the appeal was denied.

In reaction to this verdict, Okamura announced that it was a "political decision", and questioned the independence of the judiciary. Rejecting the verdict of the Constitutional Court, Okamura denounced the verdict as unfair and claimed that it was not possible to obtain justice in the Czech Republic.

=== Dawn of Direct Democracy ===
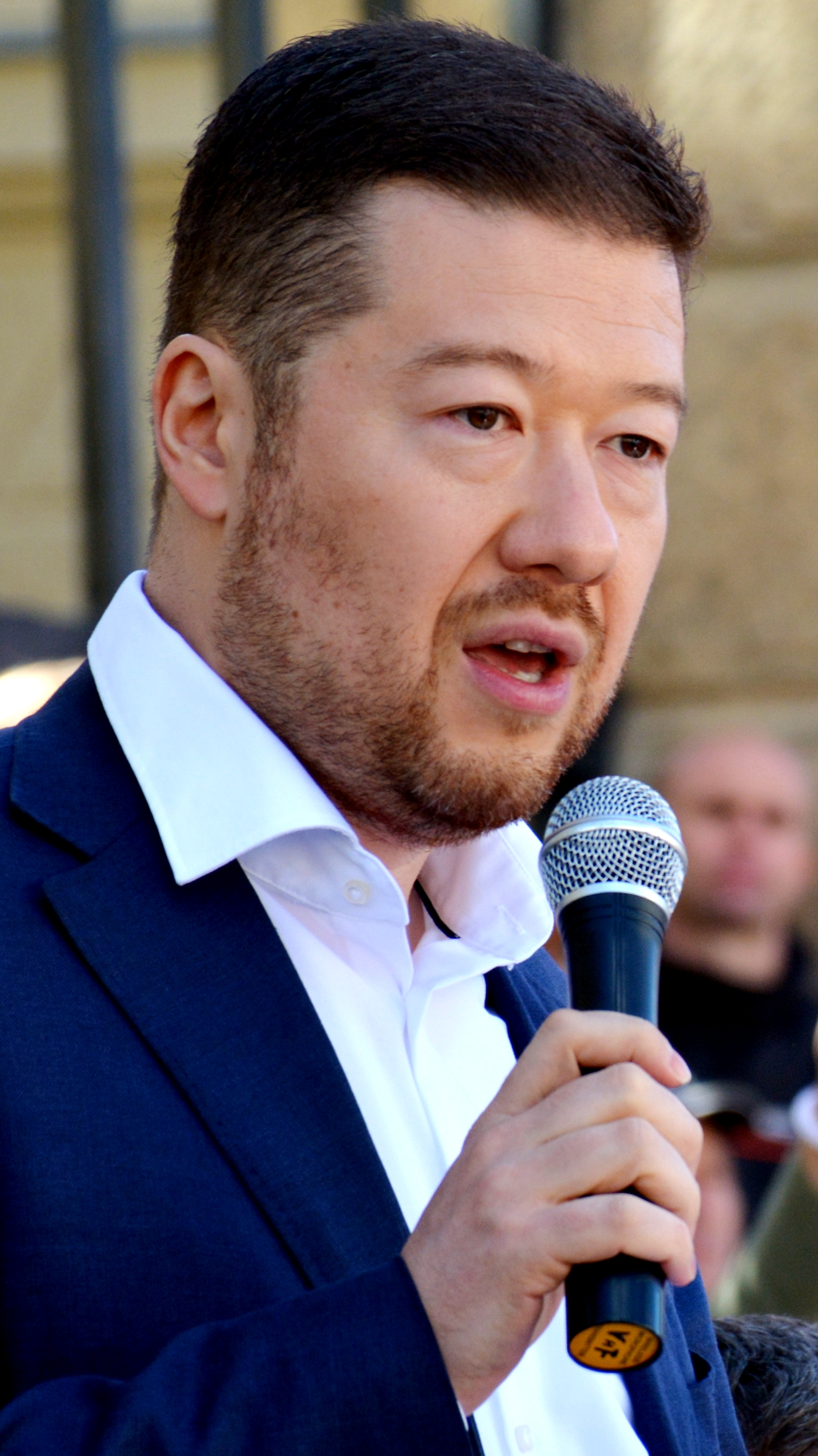
Okamura in 2015

In the 2013 parliamentary elections his party — Tomio Okamura's Dawn of Direct Democracy — obtained 342,339 votes (6.88%) and gained 14 seats. His previous senatorial mandate expired as a result of his election as a member of parliament.

=== Freedom and Direct Democracy ===
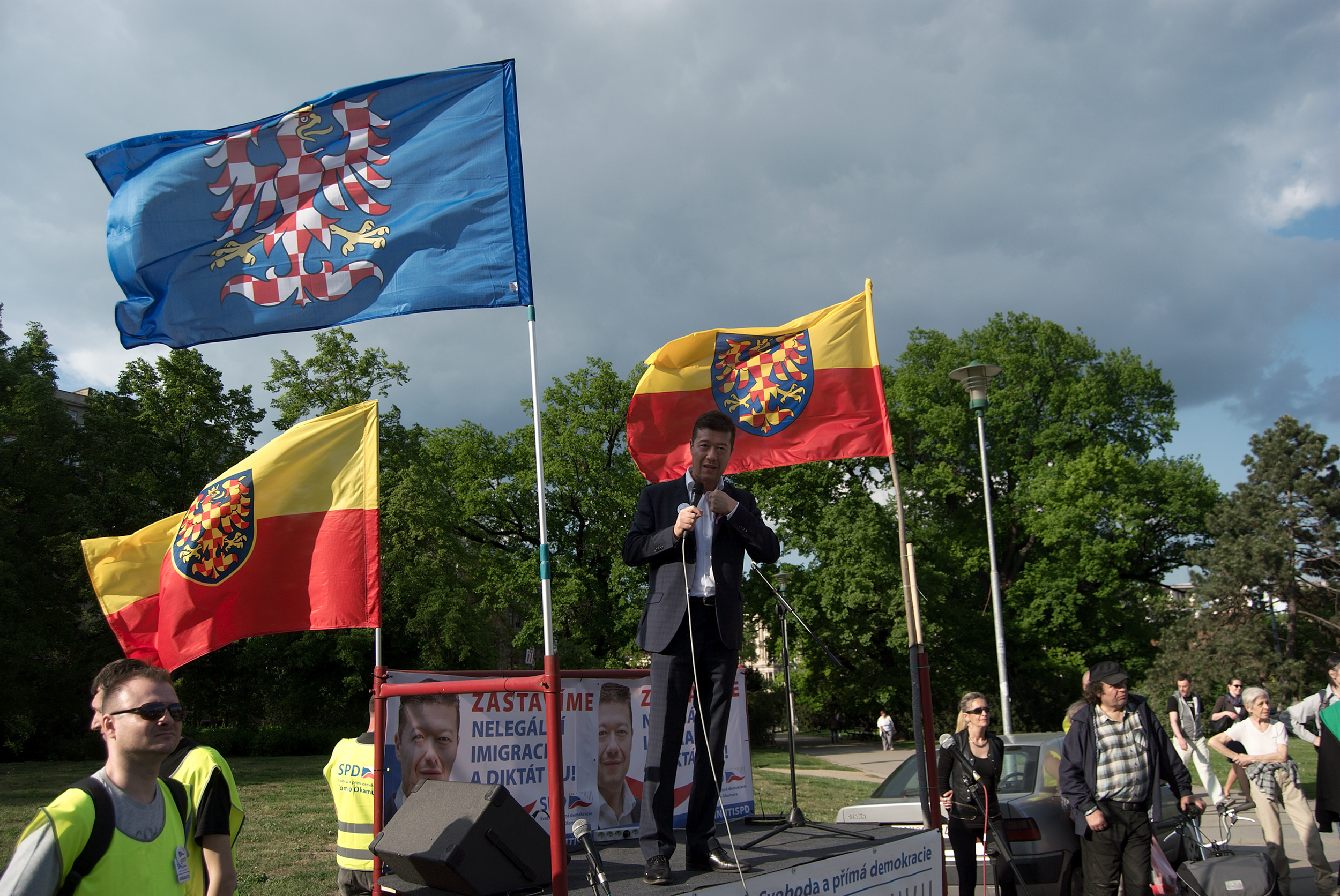
Okamura at a demonstration in May 2016

In May 2015, Okamura founded a new political grouping in the Czech Chamber of Deputies, Freedom and Direct Democracy (SPD), a hard Eurosceptic, anti-immigration, and pro-direct democracy party. The SPD is allied to the French National Rally via the Movement for a Europe of Nations and Freedom European parliamentary alliance.

Okamura was reelected as a deputy in the 2017 parliamentary elections. The party came fourth, winning 22 seats.

In the 2021 parliamentary election, SPD again came fourth, winning 20 seats, with Okamura being reelected.

For the 2025 parliamentary election, SPD formed an informal coalition with three right-wing to far-right parties: PRO, Svobodní and Tricolour. They came fifth with 15 MPs elected, including Okamura.

=== President of the Chamber of Deputies ===
On 5 November 2025, Okamura was elected President of the Chamber of Deputies for the new parliament with 107 votes. On 7 November 2025, Okamura ordered the removal of the Ukrainian flag from the parliament building, which had been raised there since the start of Russia's invasion in 2022. In reaction, the opposition Civic Democratic Party (ODS) and Pirates hung Ukrainian flags from their club windows.

On 1 January 2026, Okamura posted a New Year address on social media, in which he spoke out against providing further weapons to Ukraine, to "sustain a senseless war", when his own country is unable to adequately care for its own people. He also expressed opposition to Ukraine's EU membership and the EU's stance on the war, and referred to the Ukrainian president's inner circle as "Ukrainian thieves around the Zelenskiy junta". His speech was criticized by Ukraine's Ambassador to Prague Vasyl Zvarych and opposition parties, who have called for Okamura's dismissal. Prime Minister Andrej Babiš said that Okamura's speech was delivered as the leader of SPD and was addressed primarily to his voters.

On 17 January 2026, Okamura ordered the removal of the EU flag from his office, which was replaced by another Czech flag.

On 26 June 2026, Okamura spoke at the 1. Demokratiekongress organized by the far-right party Alternative for Germany, where he said that AfD faced discrimination in Germany and was denied its rights, and criticized that the party was not represented in the leadership of the Bundestag. In July 2026, Okamura visited China, where he met with Wang Huning, the chairman of the National Committee of the Chinese People's Political Consultative Conference, and Zhao Leji, the chairman of the Standing Committee of the National People's Congress.

== Personal life ==
Okamura has two brothers; his older brother, Hayato Okamura, is an interpreter and translator, and in 2015 joined KDU-ČSL, standing for that party in Prague in the subsequent legislative elections in 2017. He has been a member of the Chamber of Deputies since 2021. His younger brother, Osamu Okamura, is an architect and university teacher, and also entered politics in 2023. He was a candidate for the Green Party in the 2024 European Parliament elections.

He has a son named Ruy from his three-year marriage to a Japanese woman. In January 2012, when he was 40 years old, it was reported that Okamura was dating a 20-year-old Czech student.

Okamura is a gun owner authorized to carry a firearm for protection.

Party political offices
New title	Leader of Dawn of Direct Democracy; 2013–2015	Succeeded by Marek Černoch
New title	Leader of Freedom and Direct Democracy; 2015–present	Incumbent
Political offices
Preceded by Markéta Pekarová Adamová	President of the Czech Chamber of Deputies; 2025–present	Incumbent
