= 2008 Civic Democratic Party leadership election =

Czech political party election

- 7 December 2008
- Turnout: 89.8%
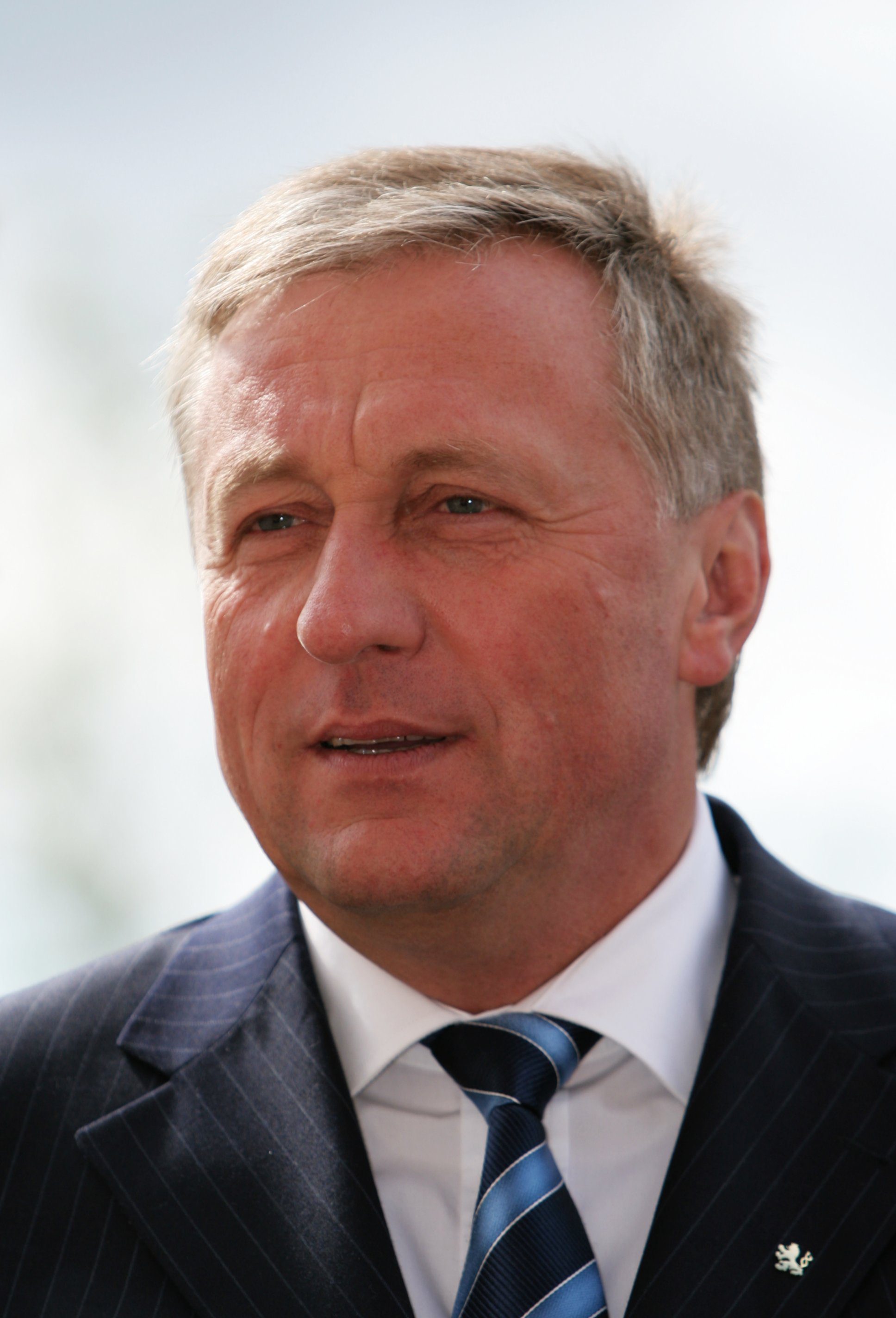

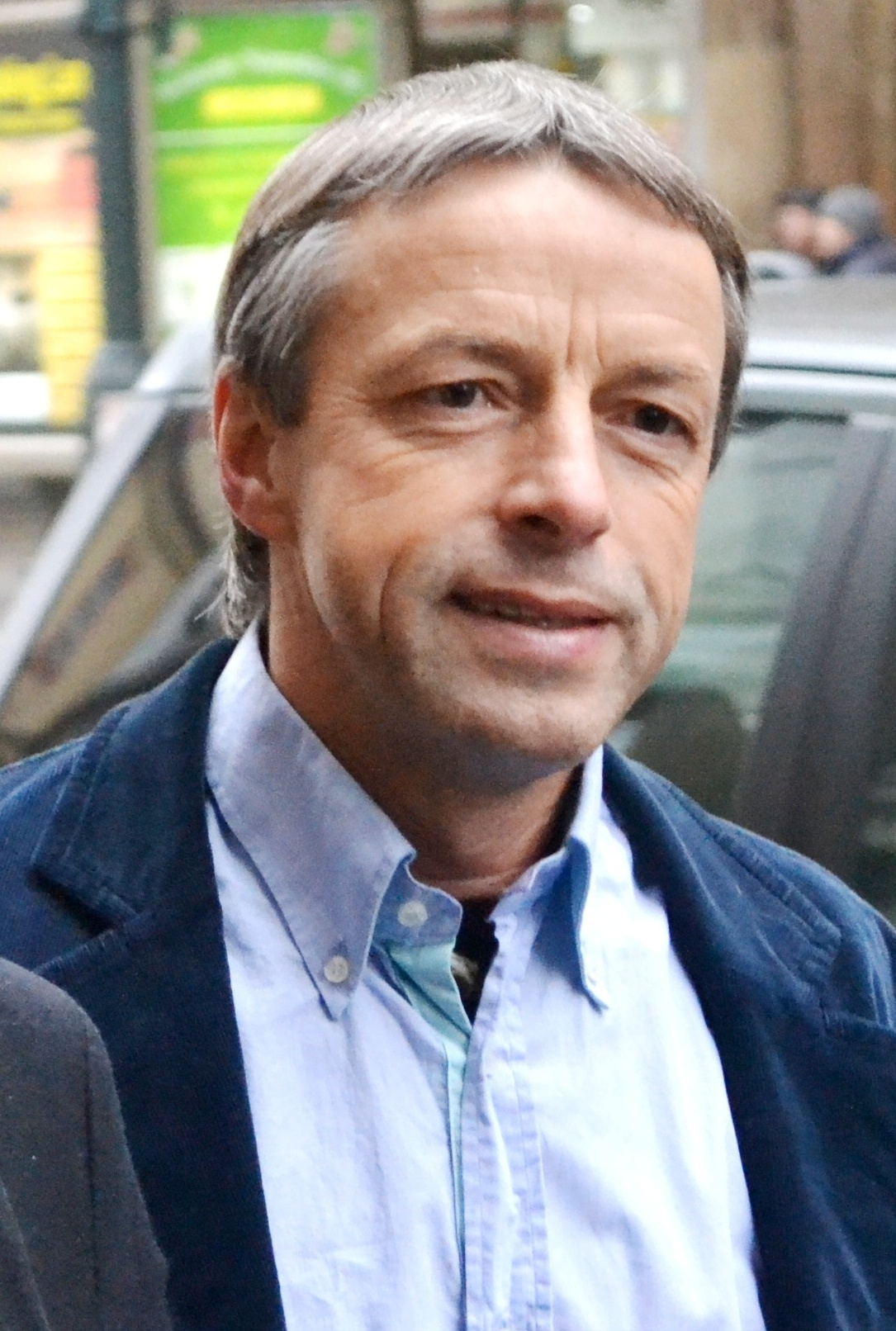
Candidate	Mirek Topolánek	Pavel Bém
Electoral vote	284	162
Percentage	63.7%	36.3%
Leader of ODS before election
Mirek Topolánek
Elected Leader of ODS
Mirek Topolánek

The Civic Democratic Party (ODS) leadership election of 2008 was a part of party's congress. It happened after ODS lost Senate election and regional elections. Incumbent leader and Prime Minister Mirek Topolánek faced Mayor of Prague Pavel Bém who was supported by President Václav Klaus.

Topolánek was re-elected when he received votes from 284 delegates while Bém received only 162 votes. 492 delegates could participate in election. Topolánek promised to learn from his mistakes and said that he will unite the party. Bém congratulated Topolánek but later saif that even though he respects him, he doesn't think that ODS will win next election if Topolánek is the leader of ODS.

== Background ==
Mirek Topolánek became leader of ODS in 2002. He was reelected in 2004 and 2006. ODS won under his leadership 2006 parliamentary election but in 2008, ODS suffered heavy defeat in regional and senate elections. Topolánek was blamed for the defeat and was speculated to be replaced in incoming leadership election. Pavel Bém was speculated to be his rival. Topolánek stated on 19 October 2008 that he plans to run for reelection.

Pavel Bém announced his candidacy on 27 October 2008. He was supported by President of the Czech Republic and founder of ODS Václav Klaus. He stated that his candidacy is a reaction party's defeat in 2008 elections. Bém was endorsed by party's regional governors. It was believed that Topolánek will be defeated by Bém. There were other politicians who expressed interest in the election Oldřich Vojíř stated that he plans to run for the position. Jan Zahradil would run if the election is deadblocked. Petr Bendl also considered running. Evžen Tošenovský and Miroslava Němcová were speculated to run. Němcová herself dismissed speculations that she plans to run against Topolánek while Tošenovský stated that he doesn't know whether he will run for the position.

Topolánek officially announced his candidacy on 2 November 2008. Topolánek was endorsed by some influential politicians within the party such as Ivan Langer, Jiří Pospíšil and Tomáš Julínek. Topolánek was supported by large portion of party's members. His supporters included some celebrities such as director Filip Renč or actress Daniela Šinkorová. Topolánek started to gather new allies. Topolánek quickly gathered nominations from multiple party's organisations. On 25 November 2008, Toolánek received nomination from Prague organisation that was considered Bém's stronghold. Bém's victory was considered unlikely.

Václav Klaus gave up his title as Honorary Chairman of the party before the election took place. Klaus stated that he has problem to identify with party's politics for very long time. He thanked the party for help during presidential elections. He stated that he realises that he would never be a president if there was no ODS and thanked for previous 18 years that he lived together with ODS. Klaus' decision led to many emotional reactions among members of the party.

== Opinion polls ==
Agency	Date	Sample	Mirek Topolánek	Pavel Bém	Evžen Tošenovský	Miroslava Němcová	Jan Zahradil	Petr Gandalovič	Petr Bendl	Přemysl Sobotka	Not Decided
iHNed.cz	5 December 2008	305 Prague Citizens	30.5%	33.4%	—N/a	—N/a	—N/a	—N/a	—N/a	—N/a	33.1%
Median	1 December 2008	536	6.1%	12.5%	8.0%	6.5%	—N/a	—N/a	4.8%	6.2%	54.9%
iDNES	24 November 2008	25,940	15.67%	17.68%	48.41%	—N/a	—N/a	5.13%	3.82%	—N/a	9.3%
Deník	11 November 2008	1,268 readers of Denik.cz	22%	9%	49%	5%	1%	—N/a	—N/a	—N/a	14%

== Voting ==
Candidate	Vote	%
Mirek Topolánek	284	63.7
Pavel Bém	162	36.3

Topolánek was considered front-runner. He received 284 votes against Bém's 162 and won the election.

== Aftermath ==
Topolánek remained party's leader until 2010 when he was replaced by Petr Nečas.
