= Porto Rotondo =

Frazione of Olbia, Italy

Coordinates: 41.0278°N 9.5469°E

Porto Rotondo Poltu Rutundu, Poltu Ridundu
- Frazione
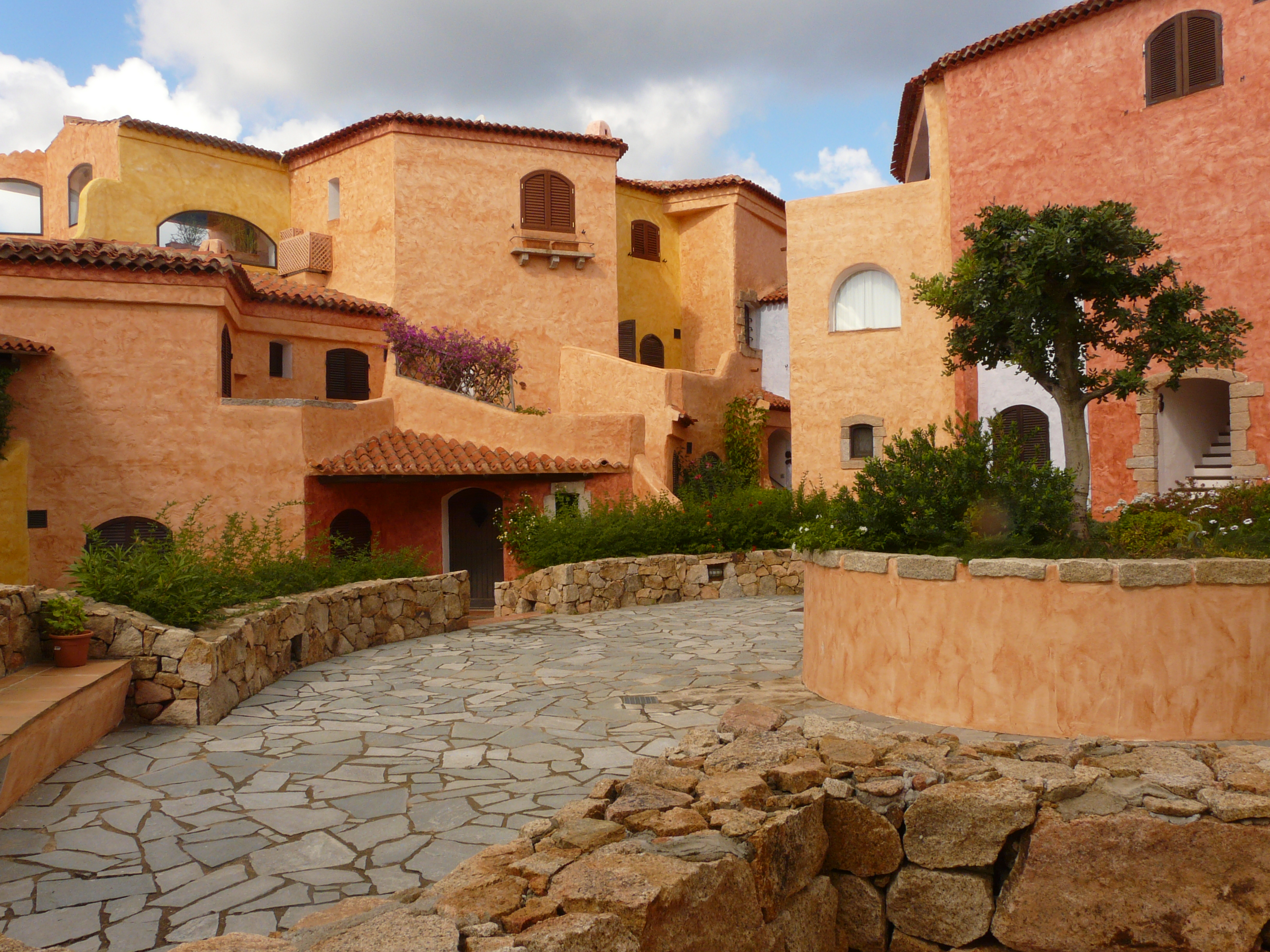
- Interactive map of Porto Rotondo

Population
  - Total: c. 1,000

Porto Rotondo (Poltu Rutundu in Gallurese and Poltu Ridundu in Sardinian) is a Frazione of the Comune of Olbia. Located in the north of Sardinia, on the Costa Smeralda, it is one of the Island’s major tourist destinations, known for attracting Italian and international celebrities, along with Porto Cervo, during the summer months.

== Geography ==
View of the Harbour

Porto Rotondo is located between the Gulfs of Cugnana and Marinella, located a few kilometres from nearby towns such as Olbia and Arzachena. The area covers roughly 500 hectares and forms part of the Costa Smeralda.

== History ==
Development of Porto Rotondo began in 1964 thanks to the initiative of Venetian brothers Luigi and Nicolò Donà dalle Rose, along with the involvement of several entrepreneurs such as Vittorio Cini and the English banker George Frank.

The area was subsequently developed with villas, residences and timeshare properties. During the summer, Porto Rotondo attracts approximately 20,000 visitors, with numbers reaching around 32,000 in August. Outside the summer season, approximately 1,000 people live in the area permanently. The architecture of Porto Rotondo was influenced by Venice. Its principal square, Piazzetta San Marco, was designed with a circular and spiral form inspired by Venetian architecture.

Interior of the Church of San Lorenzo

The Church of San Lorenzo is a Roman Catholic church designed by the artists Andrea Cascella and Mario Ceroli. The church contains a representation of the Last Judgment. Villa Certosa is a large private residence in the Punta Lada area, overlooking the Gulf of Marinella. It was the summer residence of Italian businessman and former prime minister Silvio Berlusconi. The villa was sold by the Berlusconi Family to Hamad bin Jassim bin Jaber Al Thani in January 2026 for approximately €350 million.
