= Topol Show =

Czech web talk show

- Genre: Talk show
- Presented by: Mirek Topolánek
- Country of origin: Czech Republic
- Original language: Czech

Original release
- Release: February 7, 2019

Topol Show is a Czech web talk show hosted by former Czech Prime Minister Mirek Topolánek. Topolánek announced his plans for the talk show on 9 January 2019. The first episode was released on 7 February 2019.

== Episodes ==
The first guest was former Mayor of Prague and Topolánek's former rival Pavel Bém.
