= 2001 Civic Democratic Party leadership election =

Czech political party election

- 4 November 2001
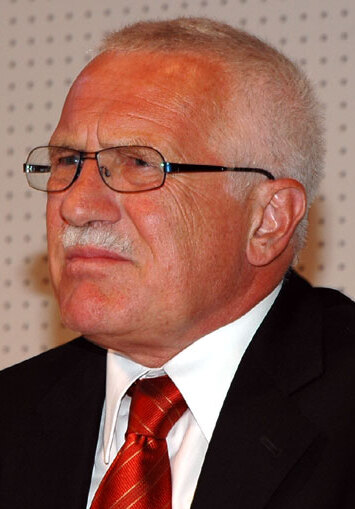
| Candidate | Václav Klaus |
| Electoral vote | 242 |
| Percentage | 92.0% |
Leader of ODS before election
Václav Klaus
Elected Leader of ODS
Václav Klaus

A leadership election was held for the Civic Democratic Party (ODS) in the Czech Republic prior to the 2002 parliamentary elections. The election was considered a part of preparations for the parliamentary elections and saw incumbent leader Václav Klaus run unopposed. Klaus was re-elected with 242 of the 263 votes, after which he promised that he would resign if the ODS failed to win the parliamentary elections. The party was subsequently defeated by the Czech Social Democratic Party in the elections and Klaus resigned, leading to another leadership election in 2002.

== Results ==
| Candidate | Votes | % |
|---|---|---|
| Václav Klaus | 242 | 92.01 |
| Against | 21 | 7.99 |
| Total | 263 | 100 |
