= Church of San Lorenzo, Porto Rotondo =

Church in Porto Rotondo, Italy

Coordinates: 41.02725°N 9.547°E

The Church of San Lorenzo is a Roman Catholic church in Porto Rotondo, frazione of Olbia, Sardinia, Italy. The church was designed by the sculptors Andrea Cascella and Mario Ceroli, along with Gianfranco Fini. Construction began in 1967 and the building was subsequently completed between 2008 and 2009.

== History ==
Interior of the Church of San Lorenzo

The idea of a church was proposed during the development of Porto Rotondo in 1964 by the brothers Luigi and Nicolò Donà dalle Rose. Construction began in 1967 and was predominantly designed by Andrea Cascella, while Mario Ceroli contributed to the interior, along with Gianfranco Fini. The church was designed as part of the surrounding urban landscape rather than as an isolated building. It stands at the top of a granite staircase connecting it with the nearby Piazzetta San Marco. The church remained incomplete for several decades. Between 2008 and 2009, the Fondazione Porto Rotondo, with the contribution of the Consorzio di Porto Rotondo, oversaw the completion of the building and the addition of several elements designed by Ceroli, including the bell tower, portal and a stained-glass window depicting the Deposition of Christ. In 2025, the church and its bell tower were granted cultural-heritage protection by the Italian Ministry of Culture.

== Architecture and artwork ==
The Last Supper

The church is built principally from granite. Cascella used the material extensively in the building, including the monumental cross at the entrance and the altar. The interior has the form of an inverted ship’s hull. The ceiling contains thousands of wooden figures carved from Russian pine by Mario Ceroli. The figures incorporate a number of religious and symbolic scenes, including the Tree of Life, the Last Supper, the Flight into Egypt and the Last Judgment. The Last Supper is one of the principal works within the church. Ceroli created the work in 1971, depicting Jesus and the Apostles behind the table beneath the wooden beams forming the inverted-hull ceiling.

The church’s fresco and Murano-Glass Window

The southern façade includes a rose window made from Murano glass, while the later additions include a dedication to San Lorenzo. The surrounding square contains marble profiles representing several recent popes and a profile of Mother Teresa.

== Bell tower ==
The church’s bell tower was added as part of the later completion of the complex and was designed by Mario Ceroli with Gianfranco Fini.
