= Vlasta Svobodová =

Czech politician and geologist

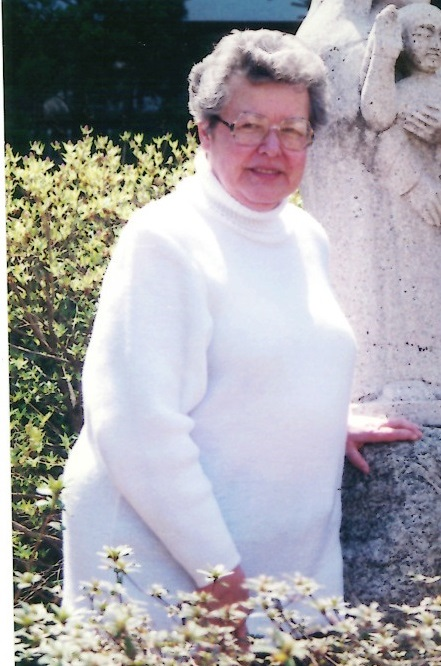

Senator from Brno-City District
- In office 23 November 1996 – 23 November 1998
- Succeeded by: Tomáš Julínek

Personal details
- Born: 21 February 1937 (age 89) Czechoslovakia
- Party: ODS
- Profession: Politician, geologist

Vlasta Svobodová (born 21 February 1937) is a Czech politician and geologist who served as senator for Brno-City District between 1996 and 1998. She won in the 1996 Czech Senate election, ahead of Communist Party candidate Pavel Pavlík.
