= 2006 Civic Democratic Party leadership election =

Czech political party election

- 19 November 2006
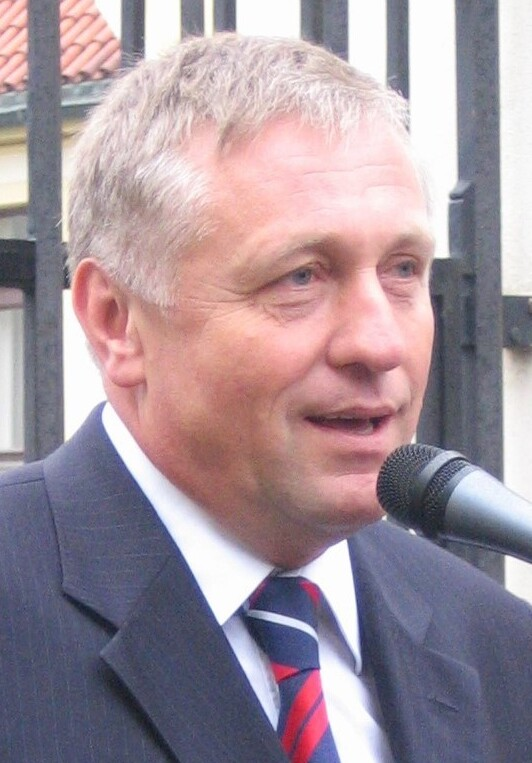
Candidate	Mirek Topolánek
Electoral vote	330
Percentage	70.1%
Leader of ODS before election
Mirek Topolánek
Elected Leader of ODS
Mirek Topolánek

A leadership election was held in the Civic Democratic Party (ODS) on 19 November 2006 following the 2006 parliamentary elections. Incumbent leader Mirek Topolánek ran unopposed and received 70% of the vote. Topolánek then started to negotiate a coalition government.

== Results ==
Candidate	Votes	%
Mirek Topolánek	330	70.1
Against	141	29.9
Total	471	100
