= Tomáš Julínek =

Czech politician

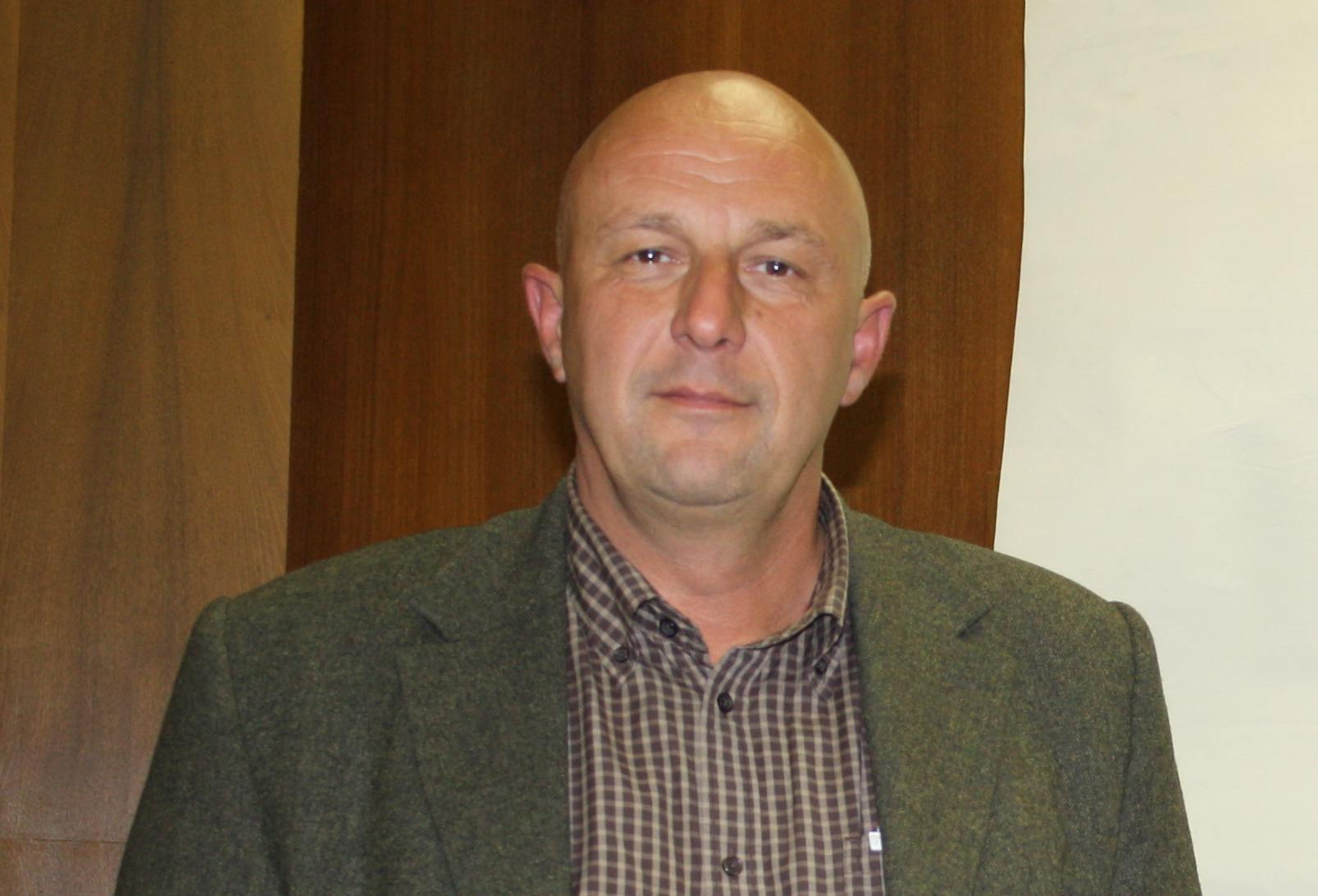

11th Minister of Health
- In office 4 September 2006 – 23 January 2009
- Prime Minister: Mirek Topolánek
- Preceded by: David Rath
- Succeeded by: Daniela Filipiová

Senator from Brno-Country District
- In office 1998–2010
- Preceded by: Vlasta Svobodová
- Succeeded by: Jan Žaloudík

Personal details
- Born: 7 November 1956 (age 69) Brno, Czechoslovakia
- Party: ODS
- Education: Masaryk University
- Occupation: Politician; doctor

Tomáš Julínek (born 7 November 1956) is a Czech politician and physician. From 2006 to 2009, Julínek served as the Minister of Health of the Czech Republic. He is a member of the Civic Democratic Party.

== Career ==
Julínek received his degree from Masaryk University in 1982. From 2003 to 2005, he worked on a reform of the health system of the Czech Republic. In September 2006, he was appointed Minister of Health of the Czech Republic replacing David Rath. Prime Minister Mirek Topolánek replaced him in January 2009 with Daniela Filipiová.

Government offices
Preceded by David Rath	Minister of Health of the Czech Republic; 2006–2009	Succeeded by Daniela Filipiová
