= Villa Certosa =

- Click on the map for a fullscreen view

General information
- Location: Porto Rotondo, Italy
- Coordinates: 41°01′20.3″N 9°33′35.4″E

Villa Certosa is a private residence located in Porto Rotondo, Sardinia, Italy, known for having been one of Silvio Berlusconi's summer residences.

== History ==
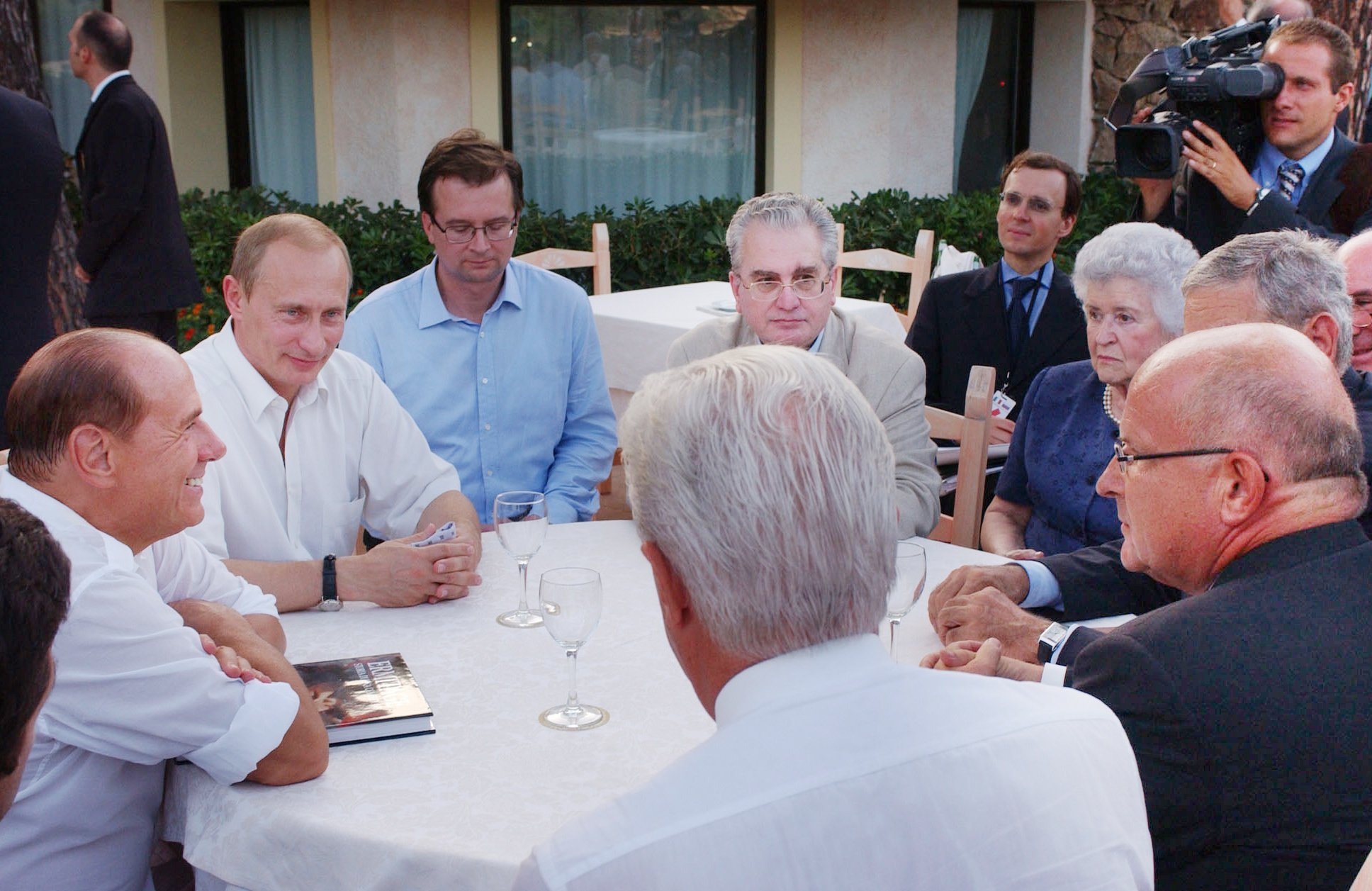
Putin visits Berlusconi at Villa Certosa in 2003

In the 1980s, the property was purchased by Berlusconi from Flavio Carboni, owner of La Voce Sarda television network. The villa known until then as Villa Monastero was renamed Villa Certosa. The property was subsequently renovated and expanded according to a design by Gianni Gamondi.

During Berlusconi's tenure as Prime Minister of Italy, the villa was used to host heads of state and government, including U.S. President George W. Bush, British Prime Minister Tony Blair, Czech Prime Minister Mirek Topolánek, Russian President Vladimir Putin, and Spanish Prime Ministers José Luis Rodríguez Zapatero and José María Aznar.

After Berlusconi's death in 2023, his heirs placed Villa Certosa for sale with an initial asking price of €500 million. In June 2026, the Berlusconi family accepted a binding offer from Sheikh Hamad bin Jassim bin Jaber Al Thani of the Qatari royal family to acquire the property for approximately €350 million.
