= Lucie Talmanová =

Czech politician (born 1967)

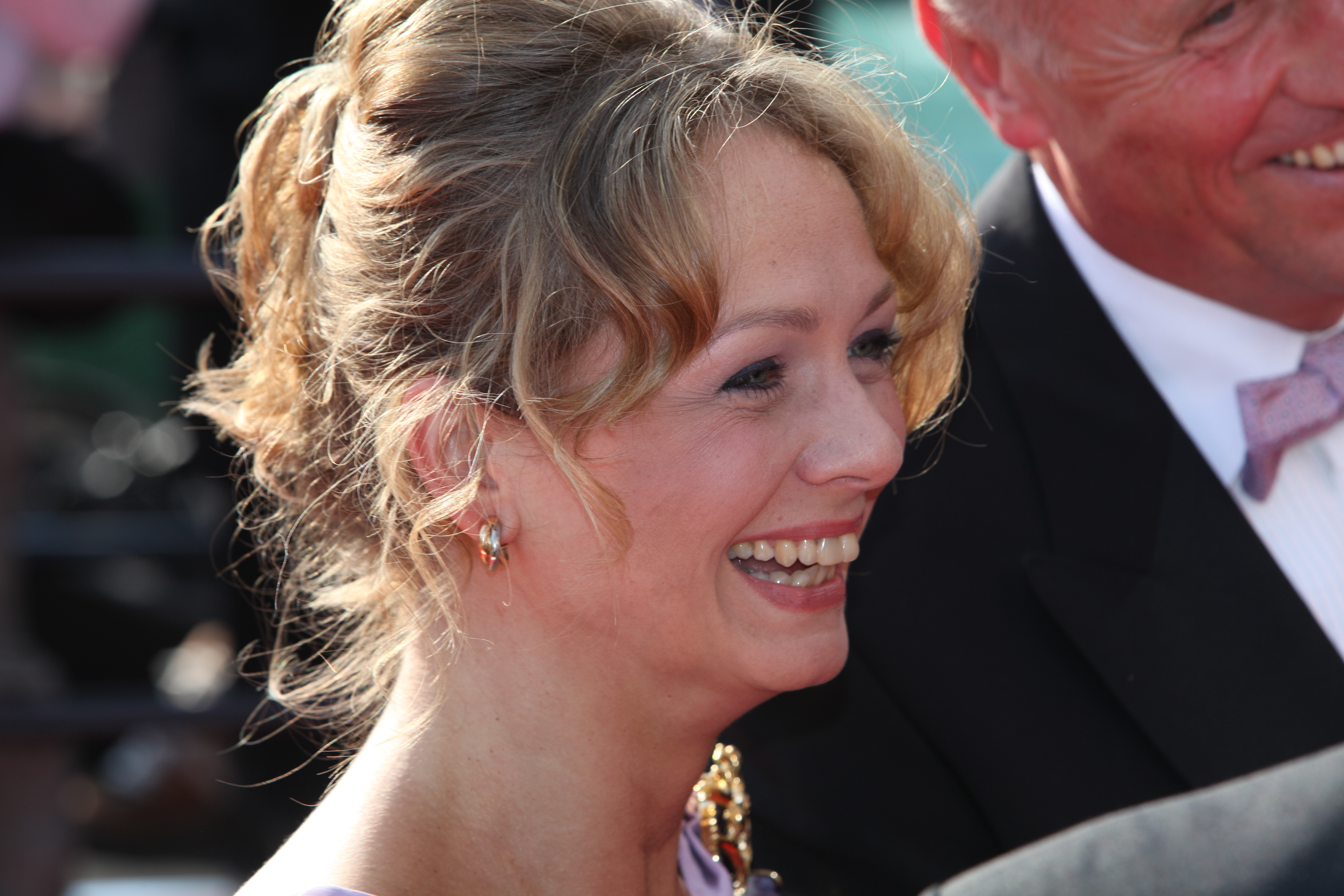
Lucie Talmanová (2009)

Lucie Talmanová (born 27 August 1967 in Prague) is a Czech politician.

She graduated from the Institute of Chemical Technology in Prague (VŠCHT). From 1990 till 1994, she worked as a radiology lab specialist. In 1994–1998, she served as vicemayor of Prague 1. Later, she was a member of the city council (zastupitelstvo) and executive board (rada) of this municipal district.

She joined Civic Democratic Party in 1991 and was elected as deputy in 1998, 2002 and 2006. In Parliament, she has been a member (later vice-chairperson) of the Committee for Social Policies and Health Care. She became vice-chairman of Chamber of Deputies on 14 August 2006.

In August 2006, speculation started about her intimate relationship with the chairman of the Civic Democratic Party, Mirek Topolánek. She rejected them and called it a "great friendship". In January 2007, information emerged that she was expecting a baby with Topolánek; shortly afterwards, Topolánek confirmed the relationship. The day after, Talmanová confirmed her pregnancy, but did not name the father. The baby son was born on 24 July 2007. Talmanová and Topolánek got married on 3 June 2010.
