= 2004 Civic Democratic Party leadership election =

Czech political party election

- 4 December 2004
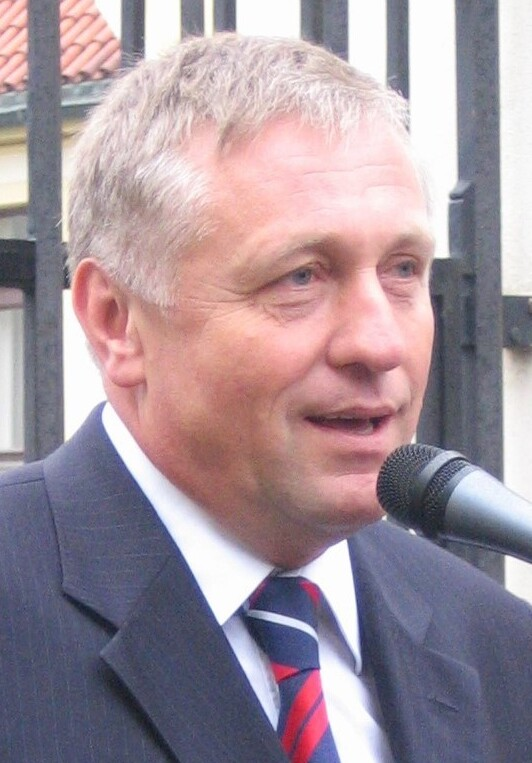
Candidate	Mirek Topolánek
Electoral vote	347
Percentage	90.5%
Leader of ODS before election
Mirek Topolánek
Elected Leader of ODS
Mirek Topolánek

A leadership election was held in the Civic Democratic Party (ODS) in the Czech Republic on 4 December 2004. The incumbent leader Mirek Topolánek ran unopposed and his victory was expected. Topolánek received votes from 354 of the 391 party delegates.

== Results ==
Candidate	Votes	%
Mirek Topolánek	354	90.54
Against	37	9.46
Total	391	100
