= 2002 Civic Democratic Party leadership election =

Czech political party election

- 15 December 2002
- Turnout: 98.3%
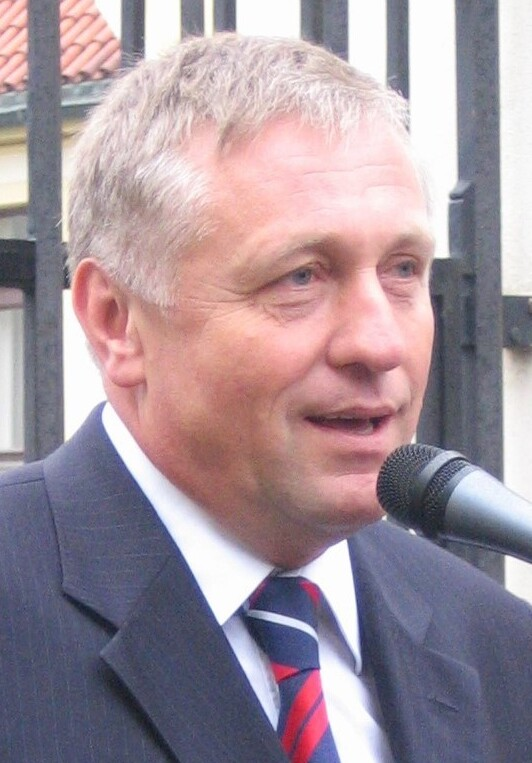

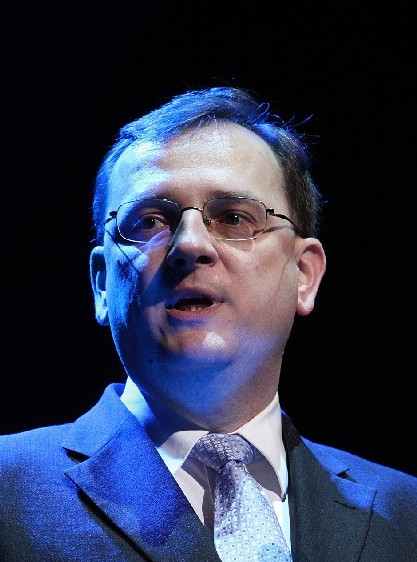

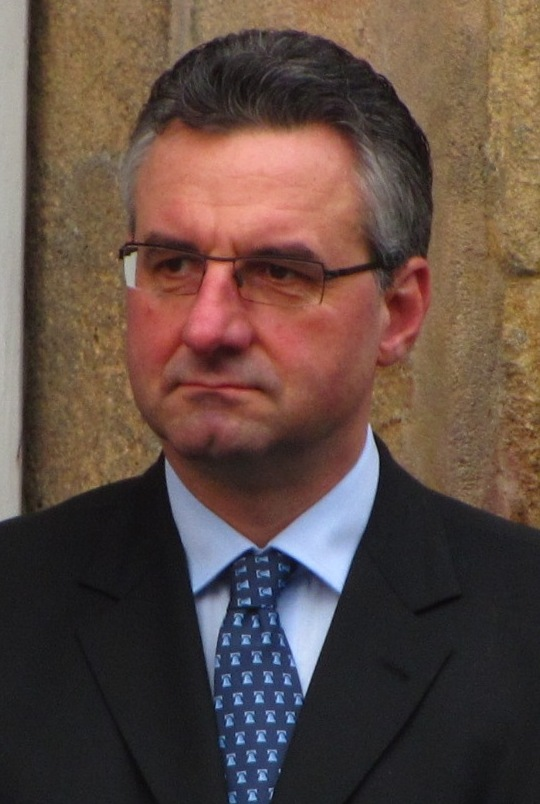

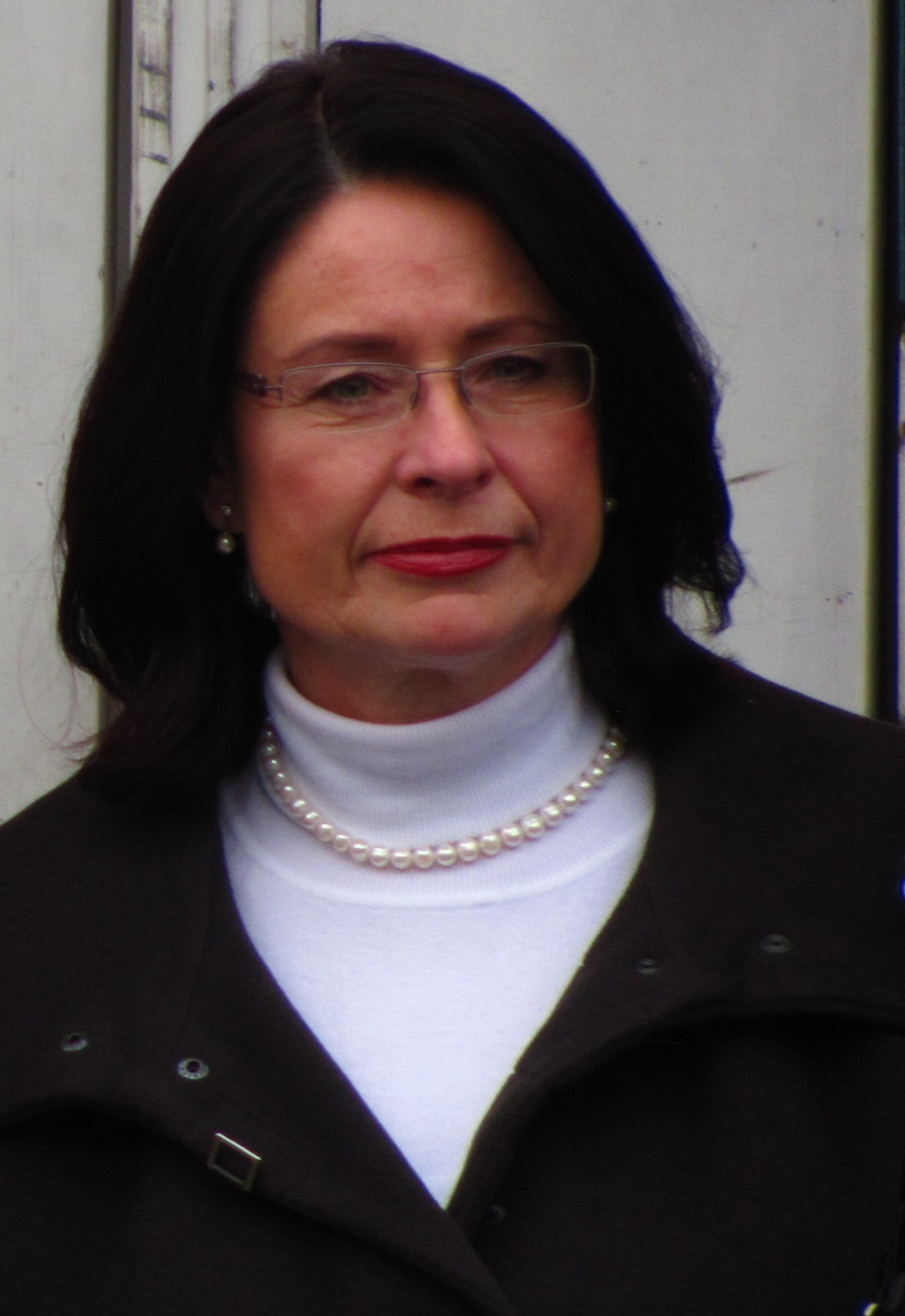

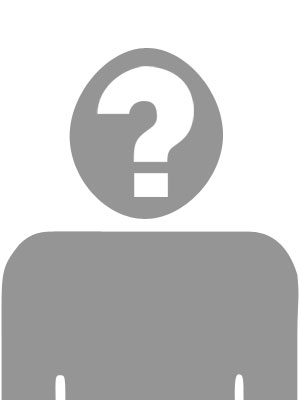
Candidate	Mirek Topolánek	Petr Nečas	Jan Zahradil
1st round	109; 31.6%	116; 33.6%	103; 29.9%
2nd round	179; 51.6%	168; 48.4%	eliminated
Candidate	Miroslava Němcová	Jindřich Novohradský
1st round	17; 4.9%	0; 0%
2nd round	eliminated	eliminated
Leader of ODS before election
Václav Klaus
Elected Leader of ODS
Mirek Topolánek

The Civic Democratic Party (ODS) leadership election, 2002 happened after party was defeated in parliamentary election. The incumbent leader Václav Klaus decided to not participate in the election. The main Candidates included Petr Nečas, Jan Zahradil and Mirek Topolánek. Petr Nečas was considered front-runner but unexpectedly lost in second round to Mirek Topolánek who was considered a Dark horse of the election. 353 delegates could vote.

== Background ==
Václav Klaus led ODS since its foundation in 1991. Party was in opposition since 2002 but supported minority cabinet of Miloš Zeman. ODS hoped to win 2002 legislative election but was defeated by ČSSD. Klaus then decided to not seek another term as leader of ODS and decided to run for presidency instead. New leader was to be elected at congress in Františkovy Lázně.

On 22 September 2002, Evžen Tošenovský announced his candidacy. Jan Zahradil reacted with an announcement that he will run against Tošenovský. Tošenovský withdrew from election on 8 November 2002. He was the only official candidate at the time.

In early November 2002, Mirek Topolánek and Miroslava Němcová announced their candidacy. On 20 November 2002, Petr Nečas announced his candidacy. Pavel Bém stated that he will announce candidacy on 28 November 2002.

Petr Nečas and Jan Zahradil were considered main candidates for the chairmanship as they were supported by strongest regional organisations. Nečas was endorsed by South Moravian ODS and Zahradil by Prague ODS. Other candidates were Mirek Topolánek and Miroslava Němcová. Zahradil also received nomination from Plzeň and Ústí organisations. Nečas then received nomination from Moravia-Silesia which was Topolánek's home regional organisation.

== Candidates ==
=== Confirmed ===
- Petr Nečas - A Vice-Chairman of the party whose candidature was rumoured even though he previously rejected the possibility. He was considered the front runner among remaining candidates. He was the candidate of conservative part in ODS.
- Jan Zahradil - Zahradil was considered the liberal candidate in election.
- Mirek Topolánek - Chairman of Senate Caucasus who was considered the least preferred candidate for Klaus. His victory was unexpected.
- Miroslava Němcová - Vice Chairman of Chamber of Deputies of the Parliament of the Czech Republic and only woman in election.
- Jindřich Novohradský - Medic who announced his candidature at last moments.

=== Refused to run ===
- Evžen Tošenovský - He announced his candidature in September 2002 and was the only candidate at the time. He suspended his candidature when ODS won Senate and Municipal elections. His candidature was called a "hostile takeover attempt."
- Václav Klaus - The incumbent leader of party. Klaus originally said that he intends to run again and South Bohemian ODS even proposed his candidature but Klaus eventually decided to focus on presidential candidature instead. Klaus was elected Honorary Chairman of ODS.
- Other rumoured candidates included Vlastimil Tlustý or Martin Říman.

== Voting ==
Candidate	1st Round		2nd Round	
Petr Nečas	116	33.6%	168	48.4%
Mirek Topolánek	109	31.6%	179	51.6%
Jan Zahradil	103	29.9%		
Miroslava Němcová	17	4.9%		
Jindřich Novohradský	0	0%		
Turnout	345	97.7%	347	98.3%

Before the voting started, candidates were allowed to make a speech for delegates. Conservative candidate Petr Nečas called for strong fight against left and for more open cooperation with other right wing parties. Liberal candidate Jan Zahradil stated that inner functioning of ODS should change and also called for cooperation with other parties. Mirek Topolánek, who was considered the least preferred candidate for Klaus, praised Klaus' role in party. He stated that ODS should embrace Klausism as its ideology. Miroslava Němcová declined to make a speech. It was expected that Petr Nečas and Jan Zahradil will face each other in the second round but Zahradil was eliminated and Topolánek became Nečas' rival for the second round. Nečas was considered the front-runner but Topolánek received more votes and became the new leader.

== Aftermath ==
Topolánek's victory was unexpected as he was the least acceptable candidate to Václav Klaus. Some delegates admitted that they voted for Topolánek because they wanted change. Klaus reportedly wasn't pleased by the result and was seen sending a text message in which he called Topolánek "absolutely dry hollow poplar." According to Topolánek Klaus accepted the result correctly. Klaus himself stated that he doesn't have a problem with Topolánek but with people who pushed Topolánek to the position with expectations that are different than expectations of Mirek Topolánek Topolánek led ODS to 2006 parliamentary election and became the Prime Minister of the Czech Republic. He was replaced as the leader of ODS by Petr Nečas in 2010.
