= David Rath =

Czech politician

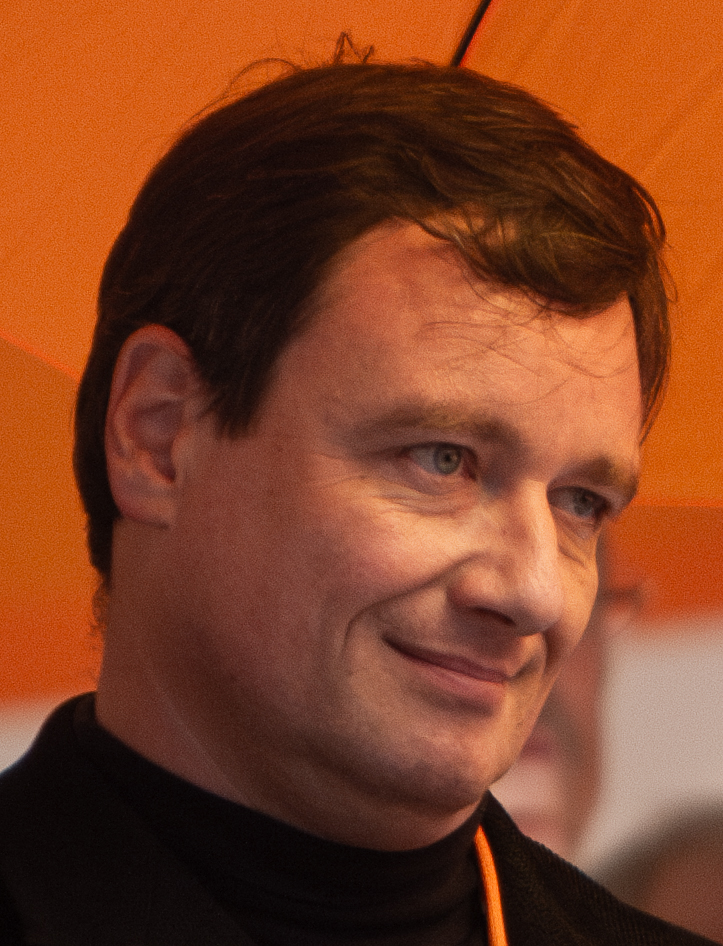
- David Rath during the European parliament election campaign in 2009

Minister of Health
- In office 4 November 2005 – 4 September 2006
- Prime Minister: Jiří Paroubek
- Preceded by: Milada Emmerová
- Succeeded by: Tomáš Julínek

Governor of the Central Bohemian Region
- In office 24 November 2008 – 16 May 2012
- Preceded by: Petr Bendl
- Succeeded by: Zuzana Moravčíková

Member of the Chamber of Deputies
- In office 3 June 2006 – 28 August 2013

Personal details
- Born: 25 December 1965 (age 60) Prague, Czechoslovakia
- Party: ODS (1991–1994); SD–LSNS (1996–1997); ČSSD (2006–2012); ČS (2018–2019)
- Spouse: Eva Rathová
- Education: Charles University in Prague
- Occupation: politician, medical doctor
- Website: www.rathdavid.cz

David Rath (born 25 December 1965) is a Czech medical doctor, former politician who served as Minister of Health from 2005 to 2006, and convicted criminal. He was a member of the Czech Social Democratic Party (ČSSD) until 16 May 2012 when he resigned after being charged with bribery. He also served as Member of the Chamber of Deputies (MP) from 2006 to 2013, first as representative from Prague and then from Central Bohemian Region where he was Governor between 2008 and 2012.

On 23 July 2015, Rath was sentenced to 8.5 years in prison for corruption and manipulation with government procurements. Rath appealed the verdict. The appeal was rejected on 26 June 2019, but the sentence was reduced to seven years.

== Medical career ==
Rath completed his medical degree at Charles University in Prague in 1990. He practiced internal medicine at General Teaching Hospital in Prague (Všeobecná fakultní nemocnice), and then at the Faculty Hospital at Motol (Fakultní nemocnice v Motole). Then in Kralupy nad Vltavou he worked for the Samaritan Association. He returned to Prague and joined the internal medicine faculty at Charles University in 1995. From 1998 to 2005 Rath served as the president of the Czech Doctors' Chamber (Česká Lékařská Komora, or ČLK), an umbrella organisation for all Czech medical doctors.

== Political career ==
In 1994 Rath joined the Civic Democratic Party (ODS). In 1995 he formed the Medical Action Group (or Medical Doctor's Union Club) within the party, which brought in significant monetary support during the 1998 elections. As director of the Medical Doctor's Union Club Rath initiated the November 1996 doctor's strike. In 1996 he was vice-chairman of the Free Democrats – Liberal National Socialist Party coalition (SD-LSNS).

In November 2005, the Prime Minister at the time, Jiří Paroubek, appointed him health minister. He was directed to fix the finances of the troubled Czech health system, and he proceeded to institute a number of radical reforms.

In May 2006 Rath made international news when he traded blows with former Deputy Prime Minister Miroslav Macek at a dentists' conference after reportedly implying that Macek had married his wife for her money. Macek was later fined for having initiated the violence by slapping Rath on the back of the head prior to delivering a speech at the conference.

In September 2006, Rath was succeeded by Tomáš Julínek as Minister of Health for the Czech Republic. Rath was then elected chairman of the Health Committee of the Czech Chamber of Deputies (lower house).

In 2018, he unsuccessfully ran for the Senate as a non-partisan candidate for Czech Sovereignty (ČS). In the European Parliament elections in May 2019, he ran as a non-partisan candidate as leader of Czech Sovereignty, but was not elected.

== Corruption charge and conviction ==
In May 2012, he was arrested and charged with receiving bribes. At that time, he served both as a Member of Parliament of the Czech Republic and Governor of the Central Bohemian Region.

On 23 July 2015, he was sentenced to eight and a half years in prison. The verdict was appealed by Rath's defense counsel. The appeal was rejected in June 2019, but the sentence was reduced to seven years. Charges in a second bribery case are still pending.

Government offices
Preceded by Milada Emmerová	Minister of Health of the Czech Republic; 2005–2006	Succeeded by Tomáš Julínek
