= 2010 Civic Democratic Party leadership election =

Czech political party election

- 19 June 2010
- Turnout: 100.0%
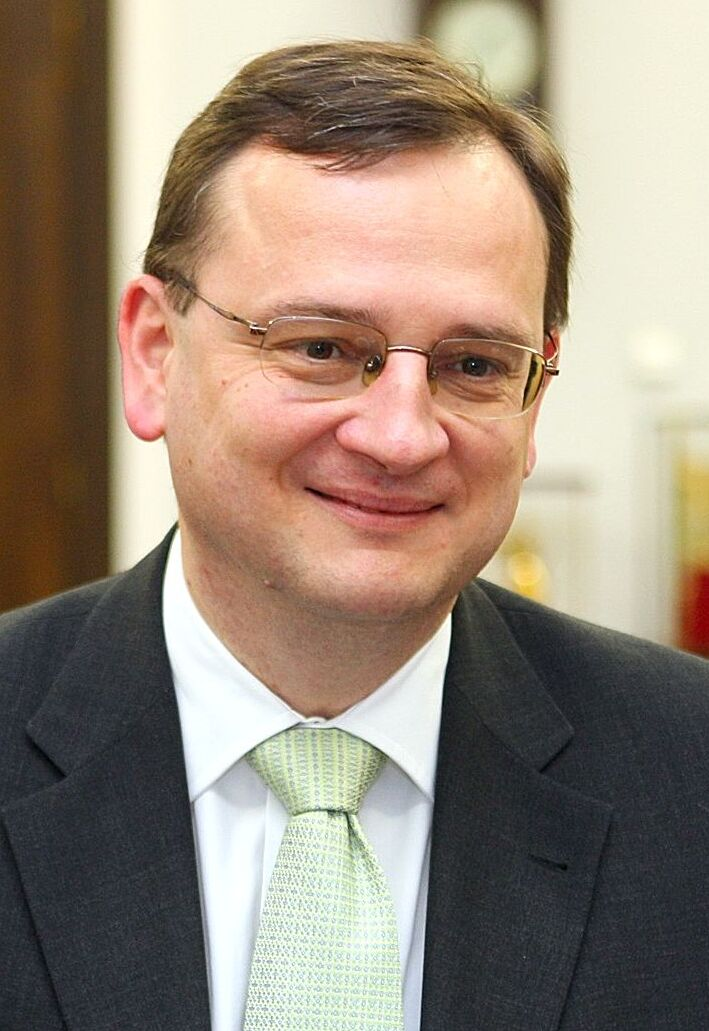
Nominee	Petr Nečas
Party	ODS
Electoral vote	538
Percentage	87%
Leader of ODS before election
Petr Nečas (acting)
Elected Leader of ODS
Petr Nečas

The Civic Democratic Party (ODS) leadership election of 2010 in the Czech Republic was a part of the party's congress. It was held after the party's unexpected victory in the legislative election. Petr Nečas was the only candidate in the election.

617 delegates were allowed to vote, of which 601 votes were valid. Nečas received 538 votes and thus was elected.

== Voting ==
Petr Nečas	Against
538	63
