= Mario Ceroli =

Italian sculptor

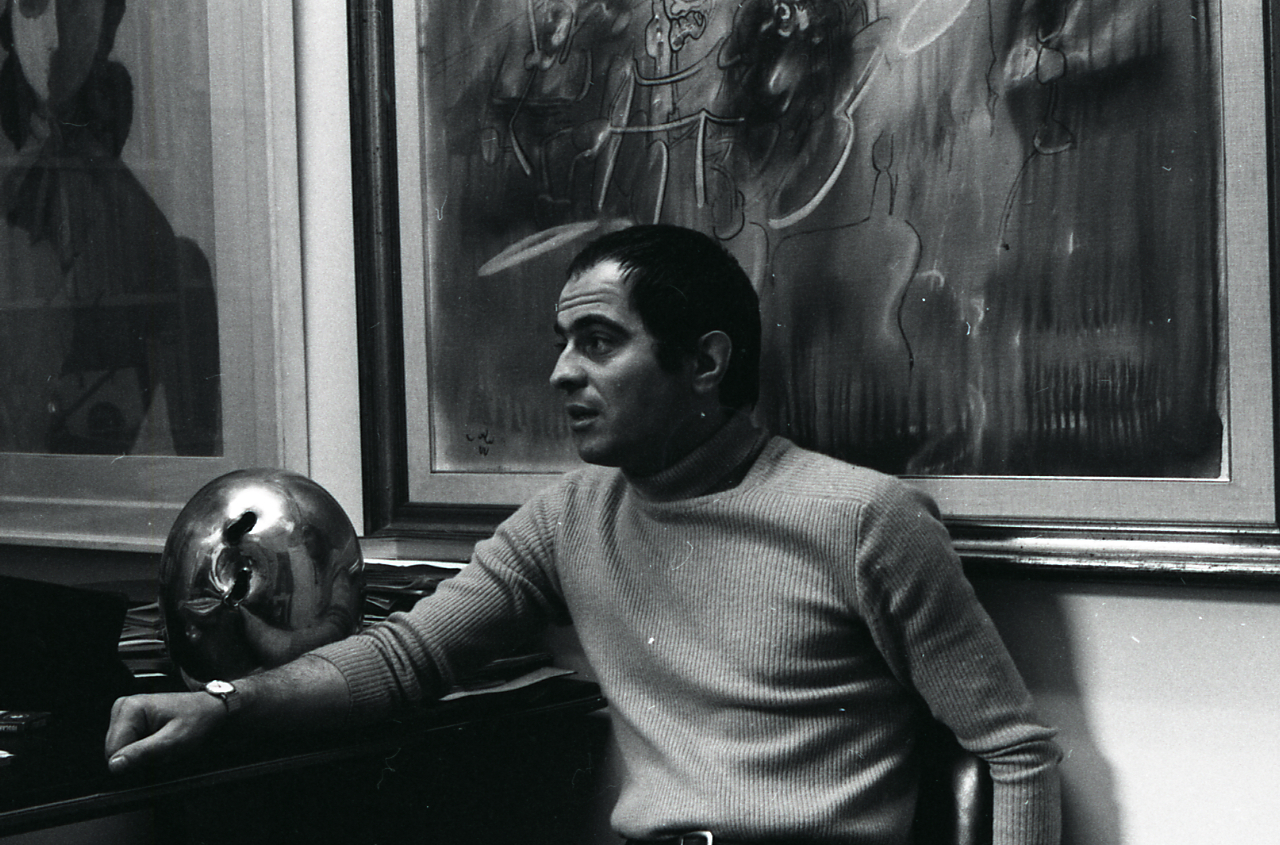
- Mario Ceroli in 1970
- Born: 1938 (age 87–88); Castel Frentano, Province of Chieti, Italy
- Occupation: Sculptor
- Partner: Daria Nicolodi (1971–1974)
- Children: 1

Mario Ceroli (born 1938) is an Italian sculptor.

== Biography ==
His work has been exhibited at the Museum of Modern Art in New York City and the Mississippi Museum of Art in Jackson, Mississippi. One of his sculptures is on the Luigi Einaudi campus of the University of Turin, and another one is at the Vatican Museums. In the early 1970s, he had a relationship with the Italian television and film actress Daria Nicolodi. They had a daughter, Anna, who was born in 1972 and died in a 1994 traffic accident.
