= Pavel Bém =

Czech medical doctor and politician

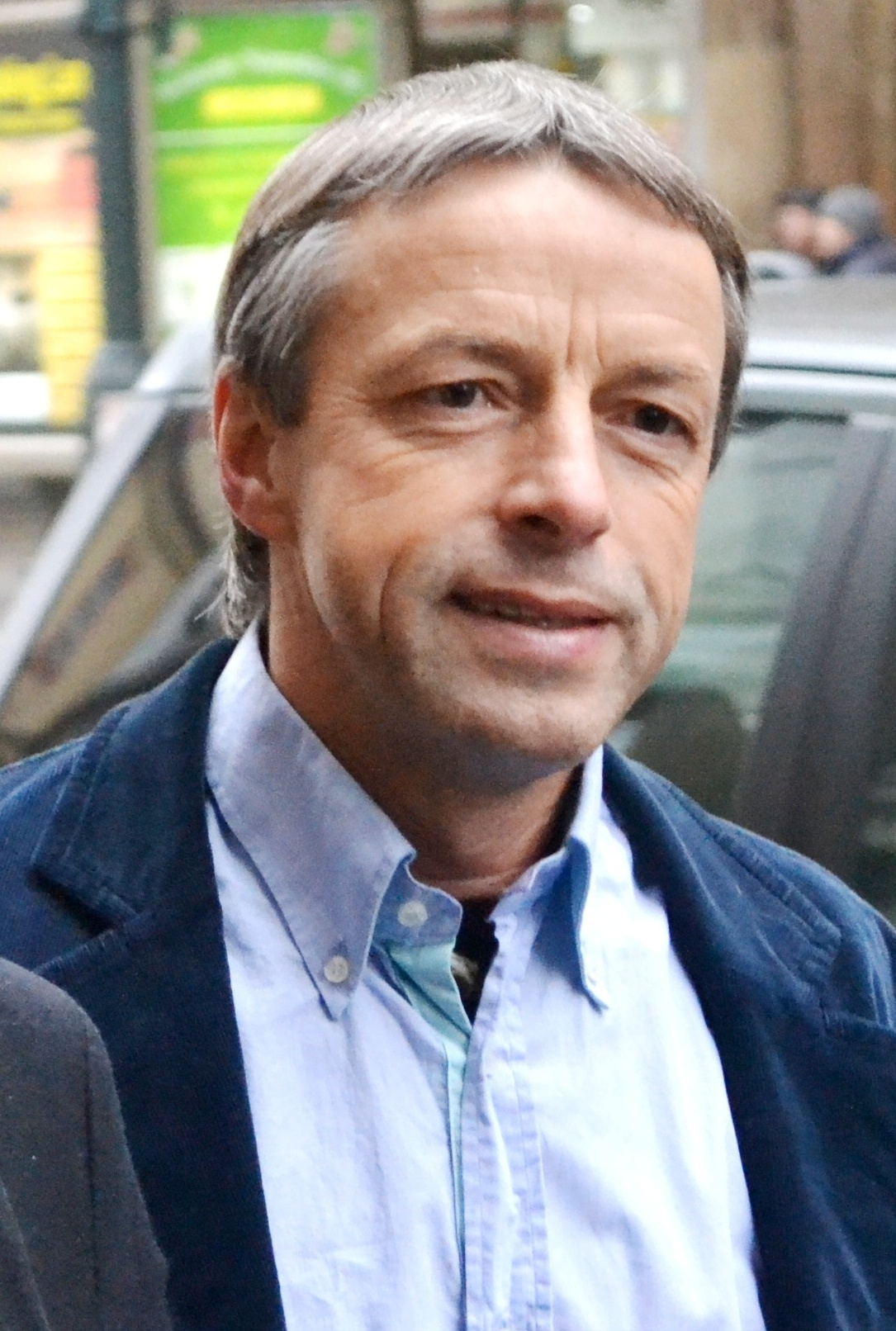

Mayor of Prague
- In office 28 November 2002 – 30 November 2010
- Preceded by: Igor Němec
- Succeeded by: Bohuslav Svoboda

Member of the Chamber of Deputies
- In office 29 May 2010 – 28 August 2013

Personal details
- Born: 18 July 1963 (age 63) Prague, Czechoslovakia
- Party: Civic Democratic Party
- Spouse: Radmila Bémová
- Children: 2
- Education: Charles University
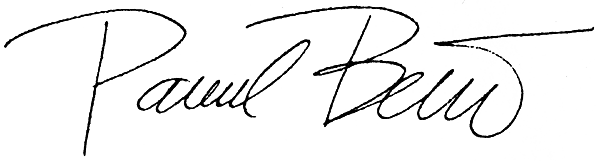
- Signature
- Website: pavelbem.cz

Pavel Bém (born 18 July 1963) is a Czech medical doctor and politician. Between 28 November 2002 and 30 November 2010 he served as the Mayor of the Capital City of Prague, and re-elected in 2006. On 19 November 2006 he was elected Deputy Leader of the Civic Democratic Party.

== Biography ==
Bém was born on 18 July 1963 in Prague. He studied medicine at the Charles University, specializing in psychiatry and subsequently devoted most of his medical career to the treatment of drug addiction. He served on a government anti-narcotics commission.

A member of the Civic Democratic Party, he was mayor of the 6th district of Prague from 1998 to 2002. From 2002 to 2010 he was the mayor of the entire city of Prague.

Bém has many interests besides his political career, including mountain climbing, sea diving, and playing the piano. On 18 May 2007 Bem fulfilled his "childhood dream" of reaching the peak of Mount Everest. On 1 August 2012 he climbed the second highest peak in the world, K2, together with Peter Hamor, and without supplemental oxygen.

In 2007, Bém and his wife received CZK 3,5 million for leaving a rent-controlled apartment from Petr Pudil. Pudil is co-owner of Most-based mining company Czech Coal.

In 2008, Bém ran for leadership of ODS but was defeated by the incumbent leader Mirek Topolánek.

Bém is a close friend of billionaire Roman Janoušek.

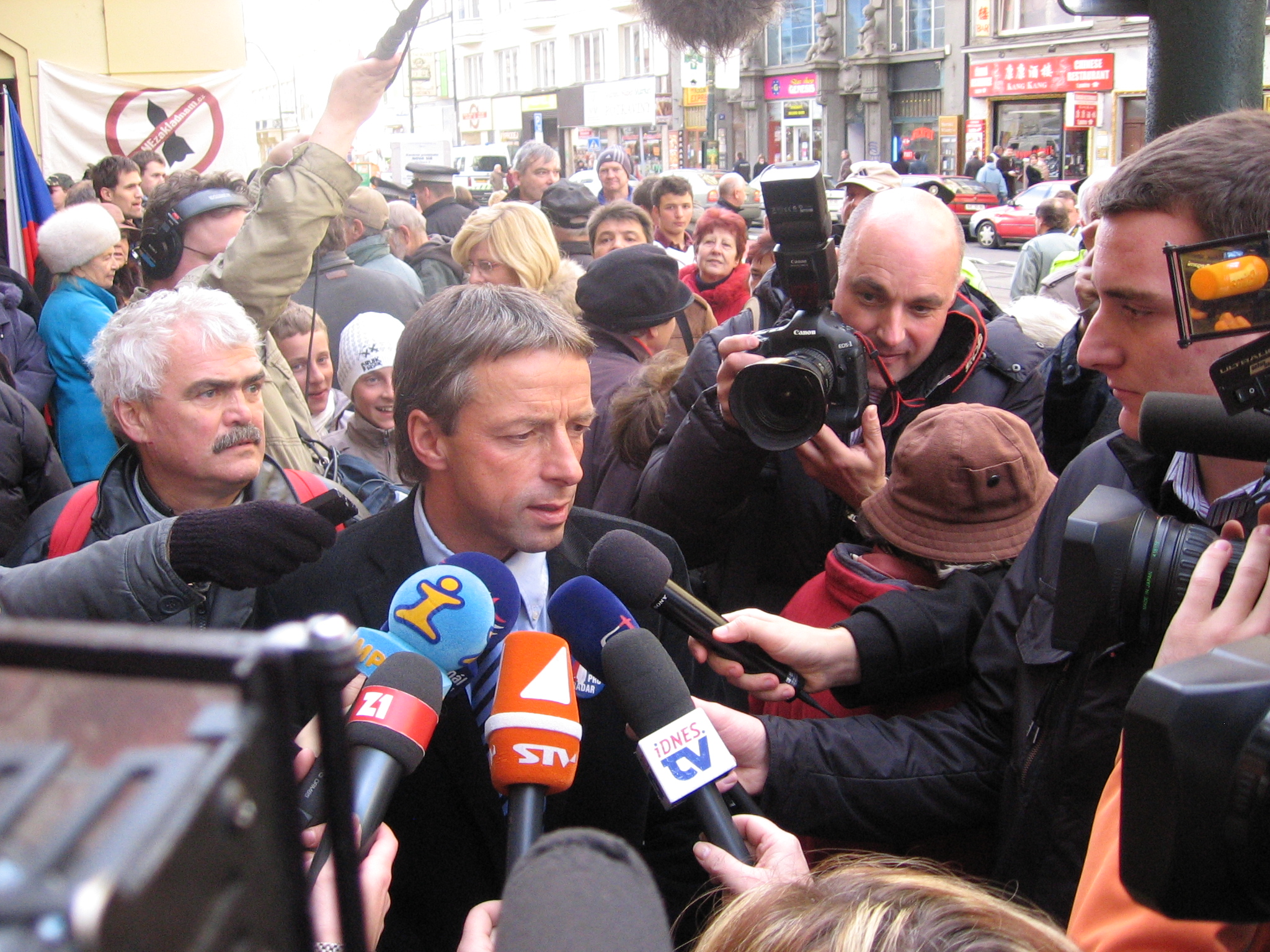
After the celebration of the 19th Anniversary of the Velvet Revolution at Národní Street in Prague

Political offices
Preceded by Igor Němec	Mayor of Prague; 2002–2010	Succeeded by Bohuslav Svoboda
