= Confederation of Industry of the Czech Republic =

Employer's union in the Czech Republic

Confederation of Industry of the Czech Republic (Czech: Svaz průmyslu a dopravy ČR, literally Union of Industry and Transport of the Czech Republic) is an employer's union in the Czech Republic. It is a non-state organization, independent of government, political parties and trade unions, influencing the economic and social policy of the government and working to create optimal conditions for business. It defends the interests of employers at the level of the Czech Republic, but also in European and global organizations. It negotiates on behalf of employers with the government and trade unions in the Council of Economic and Social Agreements, the so-called tripartite.

== Members ==
According to its own data, the union brings together 33 sectoral professional or regional unions and associations (collective members), 146 individual member companies and 4 observers (as of June 2019). In total, it thus represents approximately 11,000 companies that employ 1.3 million workers. It has seven regional offices in the Czech Republic, which negotiate on behalf of employers in regional tripartites. It is a member of Confederation of European Business.

== Organisation ==
The Confederation of Industry of the Czech Republic is headed by a nineteen-member board of directors, which is elected from the representatives of member companies. The board consists of a president, seven vice presidents, and 11 board members. The supervisory body of the Association is a five-member supervisory board. Since 2011, the Union of Industry and Transport of the Czech Republic has been led by president Jaroslav Hanák, who was reelected in 2015 and 2019 elections.

=== Presidents ===
- 1990 – Miroslav Grégr
- 1990–1993 – Hynek Hanák
- 1993–2000 – Štěpán Popovič
- 2000–2001 – Petr Karas
- 2001–2004 – Stanislav Kázecký
- 2004–2011 – Jaroslav Míl
- Since 2011 – Jaroslav Hanák
