= Mirek Topolánek =

Prime Minister of the Czech Republic from 2006 to 2009

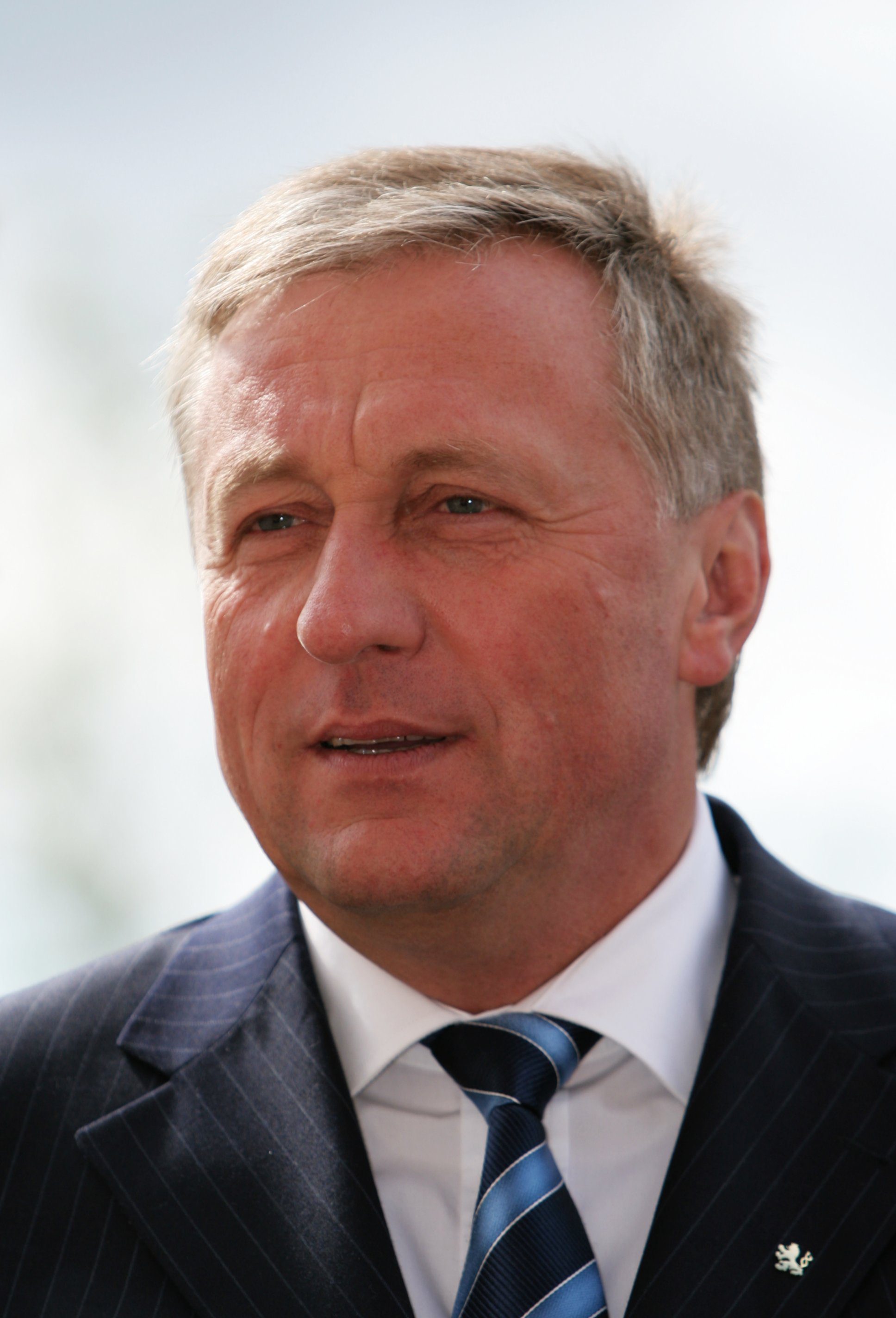
- Topolánek in 2007

Prime Minister of the Czech Republic
- In office 16 August 2006 – 9 April 2009
- President: Václav Klaus
- Deputy: Martin Bursík; Vlasta Parkanová; Petr Nečas; Alexandr Vondra
- Preceded by: Jiří Paroubek
- Succeeded by: Jan Fischer

Leader of the Civic Democratic Party
- In office 15 December 2002 – 13 April 2010
- Preceded by: Václav Klaus
- Succeeded by: Petr Nečas

Member of the Chamber of Deputies
- In office 3 June 2006 – 15 September 2009

Senator from Ostrava
- In office 23 November 1996 – 21 November 2004
- Preceded by: Position established
- Succeeded by: Liana Janáčková

Personal details
- Born: 15 May 1956 (age 70) Vsetín, Czechoslovakia
- Party: Civic Democratic Party (1994–2015); Independent (2015–present)
- Other political affiliations: Civic Forum (1989–1991)
- Spouse(s): Pavla Patáková (m. 1979; div. 2010) Lucie Talmanová (m. 2010)
- Children: 4

Mirek Topolánek (Czech pronunciation: [ˈmɪrɛk ˈtopolaːnɛk], born 15 May 1956) is a Czech politician and business manager who served as the prime minister of the Czech Republic from 2006 to 2009 and the leader of the Civic Democratic Party (ODS) from 2002 to 2010. Between 2006 and 2009, Topolánek was the member of the Chamber of Deputies (MP) and senator from Ostrava from 1996 until 2004. After leaving politics in 2010, Topolánek has been active in the electric power industry as a vocal lobbyist for the fossil fuel industry.

On 24 March 2009, Topolánek resigned as prime minister after he lost a no-confidence vote in the Chamber of Deputies. He remained in office until 8 May, at which point Jan Fischer took office as an independent prime minister leading an interim caretaker government.

In November 2017, Topolánek announced his bid for the presidency in the 2018 election but received only 4% and came sixth in the election.

== Early life ==
Mirek Topolánek attended a military high school in Opava, where he became a Socialistic Union of Youth member which he claimed to be semi-obligatory for future career officers of the Czechoslovak People's Army. After finishing he studied at Brno University of Technology where he received an Ing. degree in mechanical engineering. In 1996 he won a scholarship for Training Course in Management of small and medium enterprise (MIM) in Cyprus and also attended a post-graduate Course in Corporate Management (Centre for Management Training, Čelákovice CZ).

He entered politics by becoming a member of a post-communist catch-all civic movement Civic Forum in 1989 and has been a member of the Civic Democratic Party since 1994. Topolánek co-founded the engineering company VAE Ltd. in 1991 and was a member of the VAE Inc. board of directors from 1996 to 2003.

== Political career ==
Topolánek was elected municipal councillor for Ostrava-Poruba in 1990. He remained in the position until 1994.

Topolánek ran in the 1996 Senate election in Ostrava-city district where he faced the Social Democrat candidate Jiří Smejkal. His campaign drew the attention of media due to its being largely focused on Topolánek's family, which was at the time considered unusual in the Czech Republic. Topolánek's wife Pavla was nicknamed Ostravan Hillary thanks to the campaign. Topolánek won the election when, defeating his rival by a margin of 630 votes and becoming the new Senator. Topolánek was elected in leader of leader of Ostravan regional organisation of ODS in 1998 by large margin. He was reelected Senator in 1998 after defeating Jiří Grossmann. His reelection campaign also focused on his family. Topolánek then became leader of Party's senate caucus.

From 2002 to 2004 Topolánek was deputy president of the Senate. Topolánek did not seek a third term in Senate during 2004 election. After being elected the leader of the Civic Democratic Party in 2002 Topolánek participated in the 2006 legislative election which produced a hung parliament (100 seats for left-leaning and 100 for right-leaning parties out of 200 Chamber of Deputies members). Topolánek was appointed prime minister by President Václav Klaus on 16 August 2006 and introduced a unicolour government (nine members of the Civic Democratic Party and six independents). The cabinet failed to gain confidence in the Chamber of Deputies, but he continued to be caretaker prime minister until 9 January 2007, when his second cabinet was appointed. He put together a centre-right coalition government with the Green Party and Christian and Democratic Union – Czechoslovak People's Party. It finally gained confidence on 19 January 2007 (230 days after the elections), thanks to two social democratic MPs who abstained, thus effectively defaulting to a right-wing government rather than the unstable situation ongoing since June 2006.

== Premiership (2006—2009) ==
Topolánek formed his first government on 3 September 2006. President Václav Klaus appointed the cabinet on 4 September 2006 but it failed to gain the confidence of the Chamber of Deputies on 3 October 2006 when 96 MPs voted for the government while 99 against and thus the Cabinet, for the first time in the history of the Czech Republic, failed to gain the confidence and had to resign.

Topolánek then negotiated coalition with Christian and Democratic Union – Czechoslovak People's Party and Green Party. His second cabinet was appointed on 9 January 2007. On 19 January 2007, Chamber of Deputies passed the government's confidence vote with 100 MPs voting in favour, while 97 MPs voted against.

=== Involvement in the Anti-Missile Defence System ===
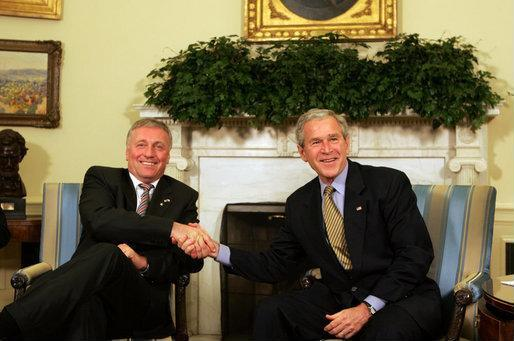
Topolánek with then US President George W. Bush at the Oval Office in 2008.

Mirek Topolánek is an ardent supporter of the Bush administration's proposed anti-missile defence system, which was vehemently opposed by the Russians, and which the Obama administration has suggested may not need to be built if Russia cooperates in convincing Iran, the country whose nuclear ambitions the defence system is to protect against, to stop the development of its nuclear programme and its support of terrorist organisations across the Middle East.

=== Five Prime Minister's Priorities ===
Mirek Topolánek introduced the so-called "Five Prime Minister's Priorities" in October 2007. It was a government statement which includes 10 program areas, which consist of 190 projects of Government's Program Goals Through Electoral Term accepted by the government. To facilitate orientation and communication with citizens Mirek Topolánek had summarised the 10 program areas to Five Prime Minister's Priorities: Healthy Public Finances, Modern and Efficient State, Safe Citizen in a Safe Country, Removing Barriers, Promoting Science and Education.

=== Czech Presidency of the Council of the European Union ===
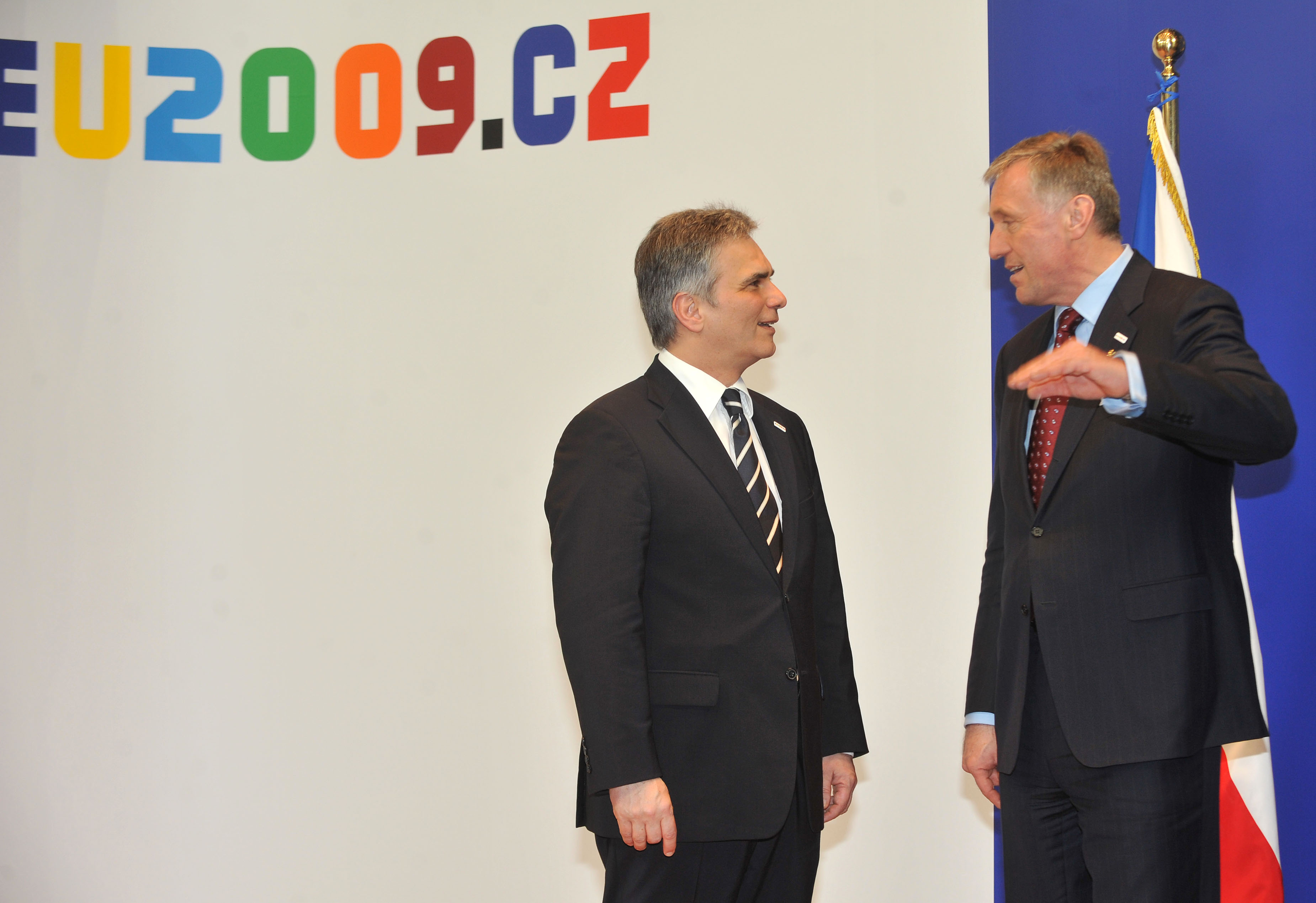
Topolánek and Werner Faymann during Czech presidency

Topolánek's government led the Czech Republic during Czech Presidency of the Council of the European Union in 2009. Czech presidency had to deal with Russia–Ukraine gas dispute. Topolánek and his team was able to negotiate a compromise between Russia and Ukraine. Another important moment was a conflict in Gaza.

Topolánek remained in position of President of European Council until his government was replaced by Jan Fischer's Cabinet.

=== Fall of Government ===
On 24 March 2009, after four failed earlier attempts, the opposition ČSSD and communists party succeeded in leading the lower house of the Czech parliament to a no confidence vote in Topolánek's government. The measure passed with 101 votes to 96 as four members of Topolánek's coalition (two of his own party) voting with the opposition. After the vote, Topolánek said that he would resign in accordance with the Constitution. He confidently said: "We believe the president should also follow the custom and appoint me to form a new government." Although surprised by the vote, the European Commission stated that it had confidence in the Czech Republic, and that the nation's EU presidency would remain unaffected.

On 15 September 2009, Topolánek resigned his seat in the Chamber of Deputies after ČSSD announced a delay of proposed snap election in October 2009.

=== Controversies ===
Topolánek has been criticised for his rhetoric, which occasionally invokes memories of the World War II and Nazi atrocities. In August 2003 Topolánek called the programme of the competing Social Democratic Party (ČSSD) to be a "osvětimská lež" (Auschwitz lie), a common expression in Czech which denotes Holocaust denial.

Further in June 2005, one year before the Parliament elections, he said: "From my side, don't expect anything else than a Night of the Long Knives. This night simply comes." This actually meant that after the elections of 2006, which he would win, he would make major personnel changes in the government.

In March 2007, he sent to a journalist an SMS message beginning with: "Es kommt der Tag...", which means "The day will come...". This was used in the 1930s by the Sudetendeutsche Party representing Germans in the former Czechoslovakia, and meant that the day will come, when the Sudeten Area will become a part of Germany. Also in 2007, Topolánek was criticised when he raised his middle finger in the lower house. In October 2008, Topolánek lashed out at a photographer who was taking photographs of his 15-month-old son. BBC reported that at one stage Topolánek pushed the photographer against a wall and threateningly asked why he was taking photos of him.

On 30 May 2009, the Italian police seized photos under suspicion of a violation of privacy. One photo, according to world media showed Topolánek naked at Villa Certosa (Silvio Berlusconi's summer house) in May 2008. In the end, Topolánek admitted the naked man sunbathing near a topless women in Berlusconi's Villa Certosa was himself.

On 20 March 2010 Blesk and Lidové noviny newspapers reprinted passages from an interview Topolánek gave to Czech gay magazine LUI which contained his several controversial statements criticising brainwashing allegedly perpetrated by Christian churches and claims which were deliberately misinterpreted so that both gay and Jewish people lack integrity of moral character, but Jews more so. He also expressed his contempt towards voters of ČSSD and described their view on minorities as 'imprison them all and kick up their arses'. He did apologize for his statements, which he claimed were taken out of context, on 21 March 2010. LUI published full video footage of the interview. Prime Minister Fischer replied to Topolánek's statements describing them as 'stupid, insulting and misleading'. He also expressed his desire to restrain his contact with Topolánek to a minimum.

In the light of this controversy, Topolánek decided to step down as election leader of Civic Democratic Party in the May 2010 legislative election. The deputy chairman Petr Nečas took up his post. In April 2015 he was expelled from ODS for failing to pay a members' fee.

== Business career ==
Topolánek started a business career after he left politics. His business focuses on consultancy, mediation of business and services, real estate activities, real estate management and maintenance, development and development of technical designs, research and development, advertising and marketing and media representation. His business was successful. Topolánek himself admitted that contacts he made in politics helped him to succeed in business.

== 2018 presidential election ==
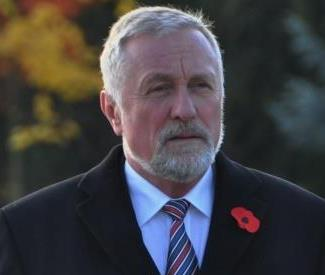
Topolánek in 2017

On 3 November 2017, Václav Klaus Jr. stated that Topolánek was seeking nomination of the Civic Democratic Party (ODS) for the 2018 presidential election. Media also speculated that TOP 09 could eventually endorse him. Topolánek discussed his candidacy with party's leader Petr Fiala and asked Civic Democratic senators for their signatures.

On 5 November 2017, Topolánek announced his candidacy. He started to gather signatures from Senators. Topolánek's candidacy was praised by politicians from the Civic Democratic Party. Leader Petr Fiala hailed Topolánek as a serious and experienced candidate. Lidové Noviny reported that Civic Democrats will support Topolánek's candidacy. Topolánek was also praised by the leader of TOP 09 Miroslav Kalousek who believes that Topolánek could use his experiences as former prime minister and former president of the European Council. The Civic Democratic Party endorsed Topolánek on 6 November 2017. The Party of Free Citizens also suggested it could endorse him. Party leader Tomáš Pajonk stated that the party is yet to decide whom to support.

Topolánek launched his campaign on 30 November 2017. Topolánek stated that his foreign politics would be pragmatic but also would support human rights. He is opposed to migrant quotas and adoption of the Euro.

The first round was held on 12 and 13 January 2018. Topolánek received 4.3% of votes and came sixth. Topolánek then admitted his defeat and endorsed Jiří Drahoš for the second round.

== After 2018 presidential election ==
Topolánek returned to work for EPH holding after his presidential campaign. On 9 January 2019, Topolánek announced his plans for a talkshow called Topol Show. The first episode was released on 7 February 2019. Topolánek invited his former political rival Pavel Bém. He eventually announced on 13 December 2022 his candidacy for the President of Confederation of Industry of the Czech Republic.

== Political views ==
Topolánek considers himself to be a liberal conservative politician. He stated that his values are conservative while his economical views are Liberal.

Topolánek stated that ODS should embrace Klausism as its ideology when he was leader of the party. He also supported indirect election.

Prior to the 2017 legislative election Topolánek stated that ODS should take more patriotic stances which he believed would prevent rise of Tomio Okamura and extremists. He warned against copying Alternative for Germany. Topolánek also stated that the Civic Democratic Party and the Party of Free Citizens were the only real political parties that had rational stances towards the European Union and considers other parties to be too pro-EU. He was also very critical of ANO 2011 and Andrej Babiš whose politics he called "theft guaranteed by state." He has also criticised French president Emmanuel Macron stating that a speech he gave demonstrated "arrogance and a disregard for EU law".

On 4 November 2017, Topolánek participated in meeting called "Law and Equality." He criticised Multiculturalism and Angela Merkel's politics towards refugees. He stated that multiculturalism is killing Europe. He warned against Sharia and called for ban of political Islam.

== Personal life ==
Topolánek has two daughters, two sons and two grandchildren. He was married to Pavla Topolánková from 1979 to February 2010. In June 2010, he married Lucie Talmanová. His hobbies include tennis, golf and rally driving. He likes books by Steinbeck, Hemingway, and Kundera. He admires such political personalities as Winston Churchill, Margaret Thatcher and José María Aznar.

On 13 October 2025, Topolánek disclosed on his podcast Zlámaný topol that he had been diagnosed with pancreatic cancer.

Party political offices
| Preceded by Václav Klaus | President of the Civic Democratic Party; 2002–2010 | Succeeded by Petr Nečas |
Political offices
| Preceded by Jiří Paroubek | Prime Minister of the Czech Republic; 2006–2009 | Succeeded by Jan Fischer |
| Preceded by Nicolas Sarkozy | President of the European Council; 2009 | Succeeded by Jan Fischer |
