= 2022 President of the Senate of the Czech Republic election =

- 2 November 2022
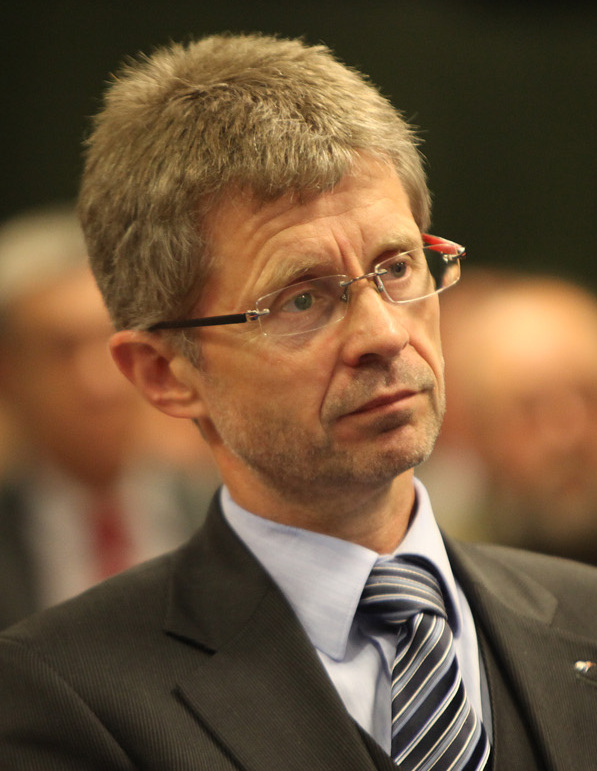
Candidate	Miloš Vystrčil
Party	ODS
Popular vote	73
Percentage	91.3%
President before election
Miloš Vystrčil
ODS
Elected President
Miloš Vystrčil
ODS

Election of the President of the Senate of the Czech Republic was held on 2 November 2022 after 2022 Senate election. The incumbent president ran unopposed and was elected for another term.

== Background ==
Miloš Vystrčil was elected President of the Senate in 2020 after death of Jaroslav Kubera. Vystrčil stated that his reelection depends on result of 2022 Czech Senate election. Vystrčil's seat is up for election in 2022. If he loses Senate reelection he would be ineligible for reelection as President of the Senate. Following the first round of senate election it became clear that ODS-TOP 09 senate group will remain largest group in senate meaning that Vystrčil is likely to remain president of the senate if he is reelected for his senate seat. Second round of Senate election was held on 30 September 2022 and 1 October 2022. Vystrčil won his senate seat Senate election overally resulted in victory for ODS-led SPOLU alliance. Leader of KDU-ČSL Marian Jurečka stated he believes that Vystrčil will remain President of the Senate. Leader of SPOLU and Prime Minister of the Czech Republic Petr Fiala also stated he believes Vystrčil will remain President of the Senate. Vystrčil himself confirmed on 3 October 2022 that he has ambition to continue as the president of the Senate but final decision is up to his Senate caucus. On 13 October 2022 Vystrčil was confirmed to be the nominee of ODS-TOP senate group. He was expected to run unopposed.

== Composition of Senate ==
Name	Ideology	Senate Leader	Seats	Supported candidate
ODS-TOP 09	Liberal conservatism	Zdeněk Nytra	36 / 81	Miloš Vystrčil
Mayors and Independents	Localism	Jan Sobotka	18 / 81	
KDU-ČSL	Christian democracy	Josef Klement	12 / 81	
ANO 2011-ČSSD	Populism	Miroslav Adámek	6 / 81	
SEN 21-Pirates	Liberalism	Václav Láska	6 / 81	
Independents			3 / 81	

== Candidates ==
- Miloš Vystrčil, the incumbent President of the Senate.

== Voting ==
Election was scheduled for 2 November 2022. Senate groups made agreement that Vystrčil will remain the Senate President. Vystrčil received 73 of 80 votes and was elected for another term. Vystrčil stated that he will do everything so that the Senate remains a dignified institution.

Candidate	Party	Votes	
Miloš Vystrčil	Civic Democratic Party	73 / 80	91.25%
None		7 / 80	8.75%
