= November 2020 President of the Senate of the Czech Republic election =

2020 President of the Senate of the Czech Republic election
- 11 November 2020
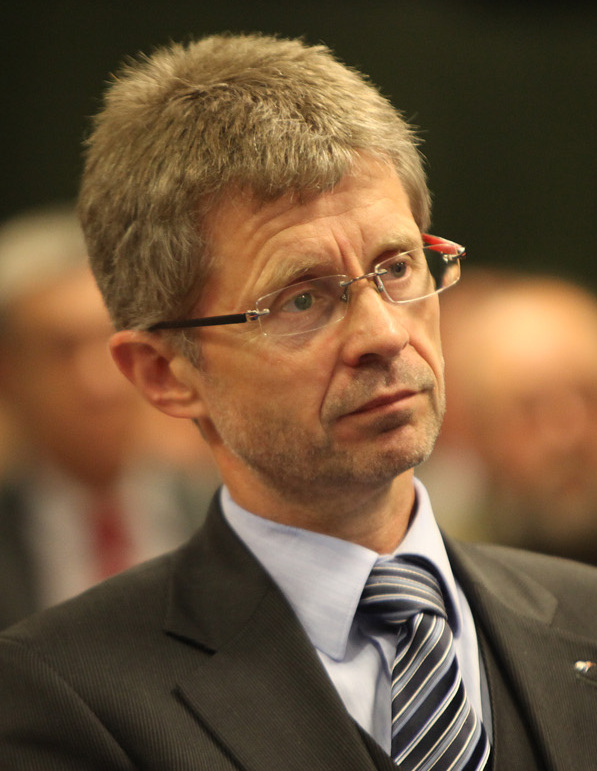
Candidate	Miloš Vystrčil
Party	ODS
Popular vote	73
Percentage	94.8
President before election
Miloš Vystrčil
ODS
Elected President
Miloš Vystrčil
ODS

Election of the President of the Senate of the Czech Republic was held following 2020 Czech Senate election. Miloš Vystrčil was reelected for his second term.

== Background ==
Jaroslav Kubera was elected the President of the Senate in 2018 election. His term would expire in 2020 but he died in January 2020. Miloš Vystrčil was then elected to serve the rest of Kubera's term.

Vystrčil stated that he wants to run for another term after 2020 Senate election. Traditionally Senate group with highest number of senators holds the position but Civic Democratic Party group and Mayors and Independents group were tied in the position prior the Senate election. Mayors and Independents admitted that Vystrčil might remain President of the Senate even if their group has more members that Civic Democratic Party group.

2020 Czech Senate election resulted in Mayors and Independents group becoming the largest Senate faction. Leader of the group Petr Holeček stated that it will discuss whether to nominate its candidate for the President of the Senate and admitted possibility of compromise that would allow Vystrčil to continue as the Senate President. Petr Fiala stated that the Civic Democratic Party will negotiate with Mayors and Independents to reelect Vystrčil.

Mayors and Independents announced on 11 October 2020 that party is prepared to negotiate about new President of the Senate. Jan Horník, Petr Holeček and Jiří Drahoš were chosen as negotiators. Zbyněk Linhart and Jiří Drahoš were mentioned as potential candidates but it wasn't ruled out that Vystrčil might be reelected. Drahoš himself expressed interest in the position. Negotiations were to star on 12 October 2020.

TOP 09 which has 5 senators who are members of Mayors and Independents senate caucus confirmed on 12 October 2020 that it prefers support Vystrčil as the President of the Senate. KDU-ČSL was also inclined to support Vystrčil. TOP 09 was also considering to split from Mayors and Independents senate caucus to either form its own senate caucus or to join Civic Democratic Party caucus which would substantially change composition in Senate. On 13 October 2020 TOP 09 endorsed Vystrčil to the position of senate President and announced its senators will leave Mayors and Independents Senate caucus. It didn't specify if senators will create new Senate caucus or join another caucus. It was speculated by media that TOP 09 might join Civic Democrats. TOP 09 and Civic Democratic Party announced on 14 October 2020 that TOP 09 senators will join Civic Democratic Party senate caucus which would be renamed to ODS-TOP 09 senate caucus. It would be the strongest senate caucus in senate with right to nominate a candidate for the President of the Senate. Vystrčil was confirmed as caucus' Candidate. Jaroslav Chalupský also joined ODS-TOP 09 senate caucus. Vít Rakušan announced afterwards that Mayors and Independents will not nominate its Candidate and will support Vystrčil. ANO 2011 senate caucus confirmed it will respect Vystrčil's nomination. On 29 October 2020 Senate caucuses made an agreement that Miloš Vystrčil will be the sole Candidate.

== Candidates ==
- Miloš Vystrčil (ODS), the incumbent president. He stated that he would like to continue as the President of the Senate. Leader of Mayors and Independents Vít Rakušan stated that Vystrčil is a good president and admitted a possibility that he could get support of his party's Senate caucus.

=== Potential ===
- Jiří Drahoš (STAN), 2018 candidate for the President of the Czech Republic and Senator since 2018. He expressed interest in standing.
- Zbyněk Linhart (STAN), Senator for Děcín district. Suggested by Petr Holeček as a potential Candidate.

== Composition of Senate ==
Name	Ideology	Senate Leader	Seats	Supported candidate
ODS-TOP 09	Liberal conservatism	Zdeněk Nytra	26 / 81	Miloš Vystrčil
Mayors and Independents	Localism	Petr Holeček	24 / 81	Miloš Vystrčil
KDU-ČSL	Christian democracy	Petr Šilar	12 / 81	Miloš Vystrčil
ANO 2011-ČSSD	Populism	Jaroslav Větrovský	9 / 81	
SEN 21-Pirates	Liberalism	Václav Láska	8 / 81	
Independents			2 / 81	

== Voting ==
Voting was held on 11 November 2020. Vystrčil was the only nominee. 77 Senators voted. Vystrčil received 73 votes and was elected for second term.

Candidate	Party	Votes	
Miloš Vystrčil	Civic Democratic Party	73 / 77	94.81%
None		4 / 77	5.19%
