= 2018 President of the Senate of the Czech Republic election =

- 14 November 2018
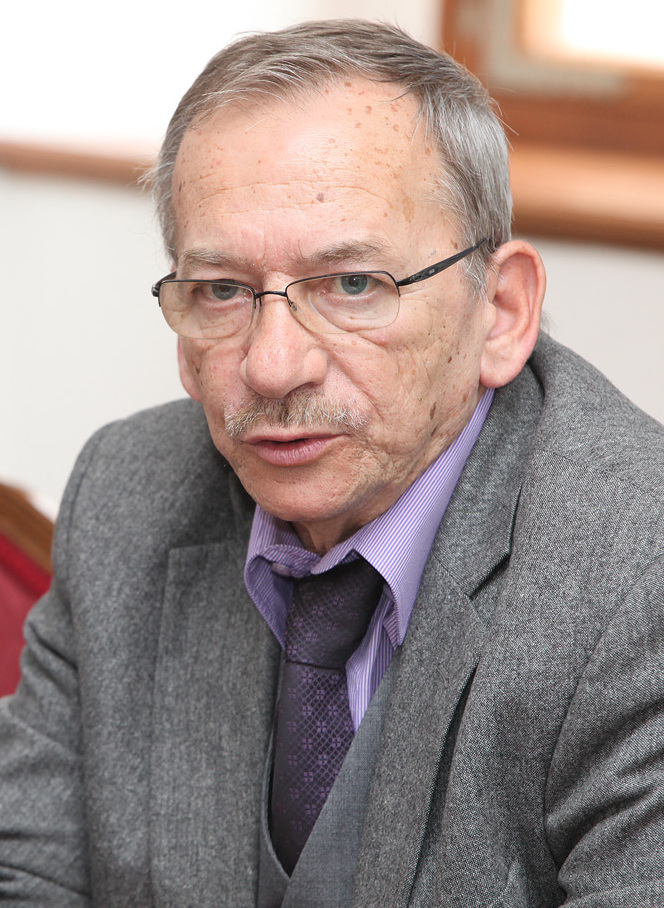

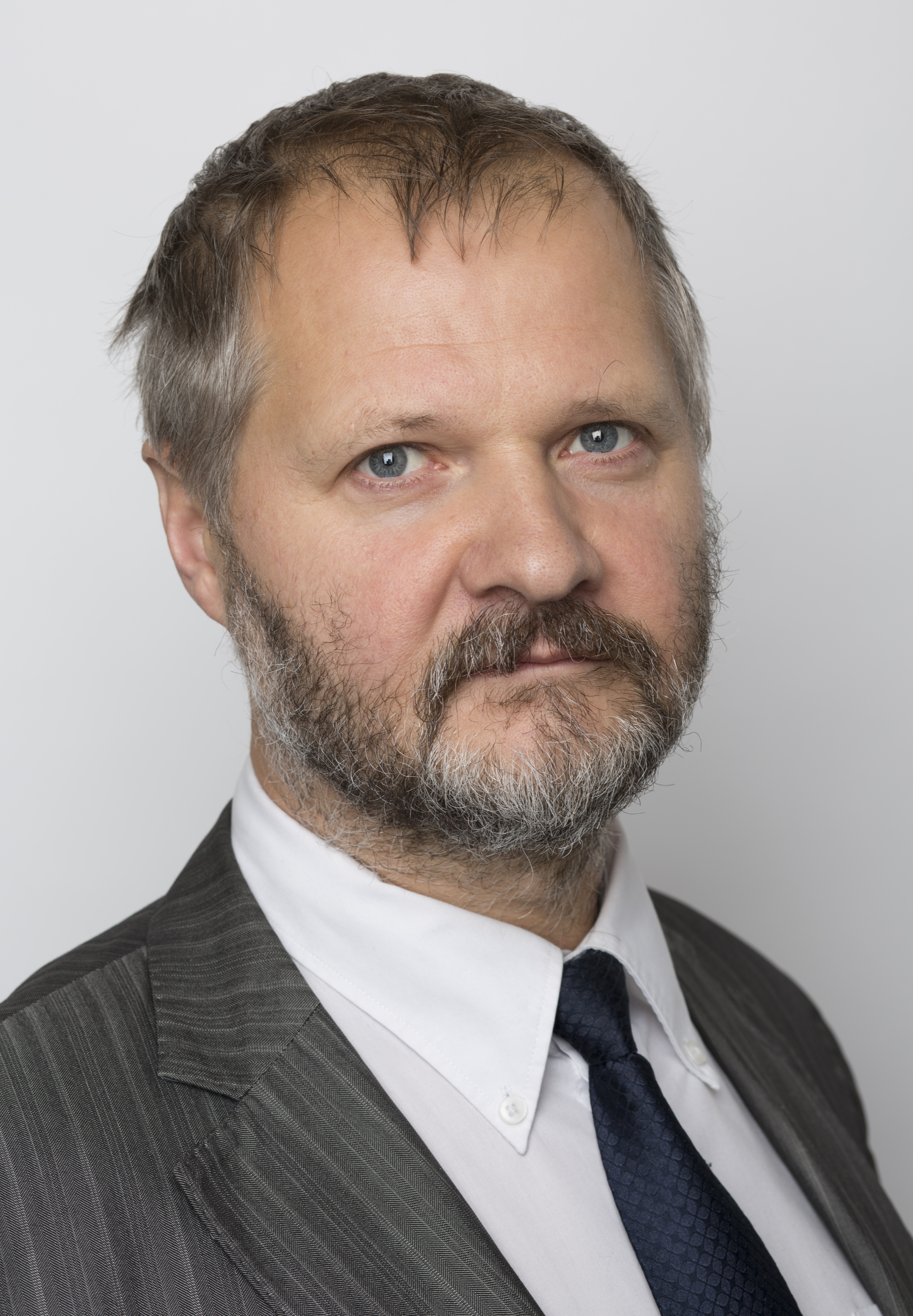
Candidate	Jaroslav Kubera	Václav Hampl
Party	ODS	Christian and Democratic Union – Czechoslovak People's Party
Popular vote	46	24
Percentage	57.5%	30.0%
President before election
Milan Štěch
ČSSD
Elected President
Jaroslav Kubera
ODS

Election of the President of the Senate of the Czech Republic was held on 14 November 2018. It was held after 2018 Senate election. Civic Democratic Party nominated Jaroslav Kubera, Mayors and Independents nominated Jan Horník and Christian and Democratic Union – Czechoslovak People's Party nominated Václav Hampl. Incumbent President Milan Štěch doesn't seek reelection. It was the first time in the history of the Senate that more than 2 candidates run for the position. Senate factions usually came to an agreement about the new President in the past.

Jaroslav Kubera and Václav Hampl advanced to the second round. Kubera then defeated Hampl with 46 votes to 24 and became the new Senate President. His victory was considered a surprise as it was expected that Mayors and Independents and Christian and Democratic Union – Czechoslovak People's Party will support other party's Candidate against Kubera in the second round. Kubera's victory was attributed to Kubera's Charisma and strategy of his Party.

== Background ==
Prior 2018 Senate election it was believed that Christian and Democratic Union – Czechoslovak People's Party will become largest senate party and its nominee will replace Milan Štěch as the president of the Senate. Václav Hampl was speculated as the likeliest candidate as he was offered the position by the party. It was viewed as an unwritten rule that a representative of the largest Senate faction holds the position of the president of the Senate.

The Civic Democratic Party eventually won the election and was tied with Mayors and Independents in the position of largest Senate faction. Leader of the Civic Democratic Party stated that he considers Jaroslav Kubera as the most logical candidate for the Senate president. Kubera was endorsed by Miloš Zeman. Kubera himself stated that party's nomination would be an Honor for him but noted that it isn't something that he couldn't live without. He stated that he believes that all parties should keep the rule that President of the Senate comes from the largest faction.

Mayors and Independents declined to support Kubera as he didn't view him as a counterbalance to the President Miloš Zeman. Christian Democrats also declined Kubera. Both parties didn't like Kubera's previous politically incorrect statements and his strongly right-wing stances. Mayors and Independents announced on 23 October 2018 that it would nominate Jiří Růžička as its candidate. The Civic Democratic Party announced it could withdraw Kubera's nomination if other parties agreed to their terms. Civic Democrats were negative towards Růžička's nomination.

Christian and Democratic Union – Czechoslovak People's Party announced on 31 October 2018 it would nominate Václav Hampl. Christian Democrats also announced they are prepared to uphold Hampl by force. Mayors and Independents criticised Hampl's candidacy as Christian Democrats have only 15 Senators while Civic Democrats and Mayors and Independents both have 18 senators. Mayors and Independents decided withdrawn Růžička's nomination and nominated Jan Horník instead.

ANO 2011 announced on 2 November 2018 that its senators will support Kubera's candidacy. Civic Democrats also negotiated with the Czech Social Democratic Party and Senator 21 about possible support for Kubera. Václav Hampl on the other hand was endorsed by leader of Senator 21 Václav Láska. Leader of Mayors and Independents admitted on 4 November 2018 that it is possible that his party won't find an agreement with Civic Democrats and the election could become a "shot up."

Political scientist Lukáš Jelínek noted on 6 November 2018 that Kubera's chances to become the new Senate President were very low but grew due to negotiations of Civic Democrats with Social Democrats and ANO 2011. Chances of Jan Horník to become new Senate President are viewed by Jelínek as low.

Civic Democrats announced on 6 November 2018 that they will stand after Kubera as its candidate. Horník attacked Kubera and stated that he would support Hampl against Kubera if they face each other in the second round. Kubera was at the time supported by his party and ANO 2011. Part of Czech Social Democratic Party faction also supported him. Hampl had support of most of Christian and Democratic Union – Czechoslovak People's Party faction and most of Senator 21 senators. Horník was supported by his party. Representatives of ODS, STAN and KDU-ČSL senate factions met on 7. November 2018 but didn't come to an agreement.

A of 8 November 2018, Kubera had support of ODS and ANO 2011 faction with 24 votes. Hampl had support of KDU-ČSL and SEN 21 faction with 21 votes. Horník was supported by STAN faction with 18 votes. ČSSD faction was split between candidates. It was believed due to the faction endorsements that Kubera and Hampl will advance to the second round. No candidate was viewed as the clear front-runner.

Kubera, Hampl and Horník met on a debate held by Česká televize on 10 November 2018. Kubera stated that his main advantage are his political experiences. He stated that he runs because position of the president of the Senate would allow him to fight Bureaucracy and growing freedom limitations more effectively. Hampl stated that he considers himself a candidate of compromise and stated that he could use his experiences as a Rector of the Charles University. Horník noted that he worked within Senate for a long time.

The incumbent President Milan Štěch stated on 11 November 2018 that there could be a fourth candidate of compromise. He didn't say who would be such candidate but ruled out his own candidacy. Main Senate factions refused possibility of fourth candidate. Nominations were closed on 12 November 2018. Kubera, Horník and Hampl became official candidates.

== Candidates ==
Candidate name and age	Political party	Details
Václav Hampl (56)	Christian and Democratic Union – Czechoslovak People's Party	Former Rector of the Charles University and Senator for Prague 1 since 2014. He was considered a candidate by some groups within senate prior 2018 Senate election. KDU-ČSL announced him as its candidate on 31 October 2018.
Jan Horník (64)	Mayors and Independents	Senator for Karlovy Vary, Mayor of Boží Dar and leader of Mayors and Independents Senate caucus. He was a nominee of STAN.
Jaroslav Kubera (71)	Civic Democratic Party	Senator for Teplice, former mayor of Teplice and leader of Civic Democratic Party Senate caucus. He was the nominee of the Civic Democratic Party. He admitted interest in running for the position after party's victory in 2018 Senate election. He stated that new Senate President should be nominee of the largest parliamentary faction. Kubera stated that he would try to "grind edges" if he becomes the new Senate President. He noted that his advantage would be that he knows other constitutional representatives well and doesn't have a problem to communicate with them despite their different opinions. He was endorsed by ANO 2011.

=== Declined ===
Candidate name and age	Political party	Details
Pavel Bělobrádek (41)	Christian and Democratic Union – Czechoslovak People's Party	Leader of KDU-ČSL. His candidacy was speculated prior 2018 Senate election but his candidacy was rejected prior the election and he wasn't elected a Senator thus was ineligible to run.
Jiří Čunek (59)	Christian and Democratic Union – Czechoslovak People's Party	Governor of Zlín region and Senator for Vsetín. He was speculated to be a candidate of KDU-ČSL. He declined candidacy on 14 October 2018 and stated that he could imagine Jaroslav Kubera as the new President.
Jiří Drahoš (69)	Mayors and Independents	2018 presidential candidate, his candidacy was speculated by media after his victory of the first round of senate election. His candidacy was declined by Senate factions due to his inexperience.
Jiří Oberfalzer (64)	Civic Democratic Party	Senator for Beroun. He was suggested as an alternative nominee of the Civic Democratic Party.
Zbyněk Linhart (50)	Mayors and Independents	Senator for Děčín. He was mentioned as possible nominee of STAN. STAN decided to nominate Jiří Růžička instead.
Jiří Růžička (70)	TOP 09	Senator for Prague 6. He was mentioned as a possible nominee of STAN. STAN decided to nominate him on 23 October 2018. STAN later withdrawn his nomination.
Milan Štěch (65)	Czech Social Democratic Party	Senator for Pelhřimov and the incumbent president of the Senate. He was mentioned as possible candidate but he doesn't seek reelection due to low number of seats of his party. He ruled out his candidacy on 11 November 2018.
Miloš Vystrčil (58)	Civic Democratic Party	Senator for Jihlava. He was suggested as an alternative nominee of the Civic Democratic Party.

== Composition of Senate ==
Name	Ideology	Senate Leader	Seats	Supported candidate
Civic Democratic Party	Conservatism	Miloš Vystrčil	18 / 81	Jaroslav Kubera
Mayors and Independents	Localism	Jan Horník	18 / 81	Jan Horník
KDU-ČSL	Christian democracy	Petr Šilar	15 / 81	Václav Hampl
Czech Social Democratic Party	Social democracy	Petr Vícha	13 / 81	
ANO 2011	Centrism	Zdeňka Hamousová	7 / 81	Jaroslav Kubera
SEN 21	Liberalism	Václav Láska	6 / 81	Václav Hampl
Independents			4 / 81	

== Opinion polls and surveys ==
Date	Agency	Jaroslav Kubera	Václav Hampl	Jan Horník	None
14 November 2018	iDnes	66.5%	21.3%	3.5%	8.7%

== Endorsements ==
This section lists notable public Personas who publicly endorsed Kubera, Hampl or Horník excluding Members of parties that nominated each of Candidates.

=== Jaroslav Kubera ===
- Jiří Čunek, KDU-ČSL Senator
- Ladislav Faktor, independent Senator.
- Zdeňka Hamousová, leader of ANO 2011 Senate Caucus.
- Ivo Valenta, Independent Senator who joined ODS senate Caucus to support Kubera.
- Miloš Zeman, President of the Czech Republic.

=== Václav Hampl ===
- Václav Láska, Senator 21 leader.

=== Jan Horník ===
- Marek Hilšer, Independent Senator who joined STAN Senate Caucus to support its Candidate.

== Voting ==
Voting is held on 14 November 2018. No candidate was elected in the first round. Kubera received 35 votes, Hampl received 22 votes and Horník received 18 votes in the first round. Kubera and Hampl advanced to the second round.

Kubera received 46 votes while Hampl received 24 votes in the second round. Kubera was thus elected and became the new Senate President.

Candidate	Party	1st Round		2nd Round	
Jaroslav Kubera	Civic Democratic Party	35 / 81	43.21%	46 / 80	57.50%
Václav Hampl	KDU-ČSL	22 / 81	27.16%	24 / 80	30.00%
Jan Horník	Mayors and Independents	18 / 81	22.22%	eliminated	
None		4 / 81	4.94%	7 / 80	8.75%
Invalid		2 / 81	2.47%	3 / 80	3.75%

== Aftermath ==
Kubera thanked senators for their votes and stated that he will endeavor for Senate to be the true Upper Chamber of Czech parliament and not the poor brother of the Chamber of Deputies. He also thanked his predecessor Milan Štěch for dignified representation of Senate.

Five vice-presidents were elected after the election of the president. Milan Štěch, Jiří Oberfalzer, Jiří Růžička and Jan Horník became new vice-presidents.

=== Reactions ===
Václav Hampl stated that he wasn't pleased with Kubera's victory due to Kubera's views on European Union. He admitted that he considers the election his first big political defeat and noted that he didn't expect the result. Jan Horník on the other hand noted that he believes that Kubera could be a good Senate President. He noted that the result didn't surprise him.

Leader of the Civic Democratic Party Petr Fiala congratulated Kubera for his victory. He stated that Kubera is an experienced politician and strong Persona who will be great President of the Senate. Senator Jiří Drahoš congratulated Kubera and stated that he is looking forward to their collaboration. TOP 09 MP Miroslav Kalousek congratulated Kubera but criticised Mayors and Independents for his support in second round. He stated that he doesn't understand why they preferred Kubera over Václav Hampl whom he considers a Persona of European Formate. Kalousek then criticised Kubera for his previous statements. Leader of Mayors and Independents Petr Gazdík defended party's decision and reminded that TOP 09 Senators are also part Mayors and Independents senate faction. The Civic Democratic Party defended Kubera and noted that Kalousek criticised Kubera for statement he made in a different context. Civic Democrats then thanked TOP 09 senators for their votes to Kubera.

Kubera himself stated that he hopes to be the president of the Senate for three terms until his Senate post expires in 2024. His Wish hasn't been fulfilled as he unexpectedly died on 20 January 2020. Miloš Vystrčil became his Successor on 19 February 2020.
