= 2024 President of the Senate of the Czech Republic election =

- 30 October 2024
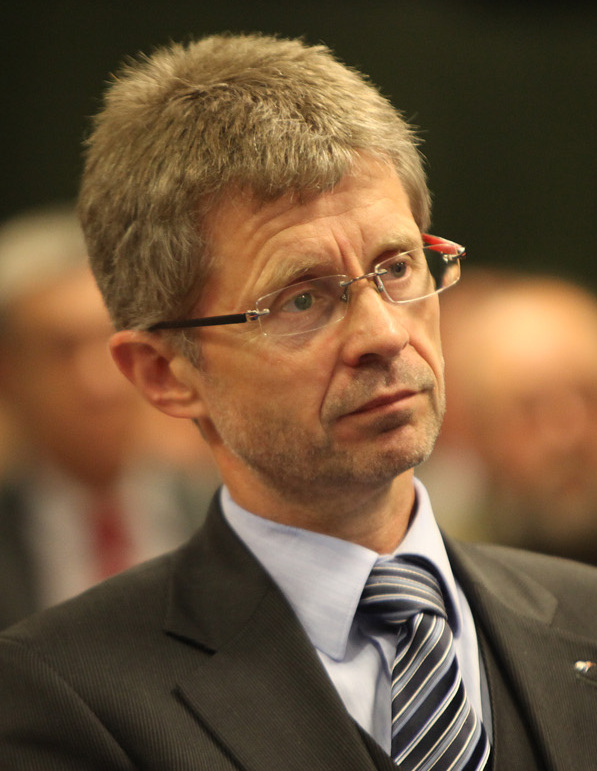
Candidate	Miloš Vystrčil
Party	ODS
Popular vote	62
Percentage	78.5 %
President before election
Miloš Vystrčil
ODS
Elected President
Miloš Vystrčil
ODS

Election of the President of the Senate of the Czech Republic was held on 30 October 2024 after 2024 Senate election. The incumbent president ran unopposed and was elected for another term.

== Background ==
Miloš Vystrčil has been President of the Senate since 2020 election. Leader of the Civic Democratic Party and Prime Minister of the Czech Republic Petr Fiala stated that he wants Miloš Vystrčil to continue as the Senate President. Vystrčil himself confirmed his intention to run for reelection but noted his candidacy will depend on the result of 2024 Senate election.

2024 Czech Senate election resulted in victory for ANO but ODS-TOP 09 caucus remained largest faction and Vystrčil was thus expected to remain the Senate President. Vystrčil also received support from STAN which had the second largest Senate caucus.

== Candidates ==
- Miloš Vystrčil, the incumbent president of the Senate.

== Composition of Senate ==
Name	Ideology	Senate Leader	Seats	Supported candidate
ODS-TOP 09	Liberal conservatism	Zdeněk Nytra	30 / 81	Miloš Vystrčil
Mayors and Independents	Localism	Petr Holeček	18 / 81	Miloš Vystrčil
ANO 2011-SOCDEM	Populism	Jana Mračková Vildumetzová	13 / 81	
KDU-ČSL	Christian democracy	Šárka Jelínková	12 / 81	
SEN 21-Pirates	Liberalism	Václav Láska	5 / 81	
Independents			3 / 81	

== Voting ==
Election was scheduled for 30 October 2024. Vystrčil received 62 of 79 votes and was elected for another term.

Candidate	Party	Votes	
Miloš Vystrčil	Civic Democratic Party	62 / 79	78.48%
None		17 / 79	21.52%
