= 2026 President of the Senate of the Czech Republic election =

- 2026
President before election
Miloš Vystrčil
ODS
Elected President
TBD

Election of the President of the Senate of the Czech Republic will be held in 2026 after 2026 Senate election.

== Background ==
Miloš Vystrčil from Civic Democratic Party has been President of the Senate since 2020 election. During September 2026 he stated that he is seriously considering his candidacy but noted it depends on the result of 2026 Czech Senate election. Representatives of Mayors and Independents (STAN), KDU-ČSL and SEN 21-Czech Pirate Party senate groups noted they consider him a good Senate President admitting he could receive their support. Martin Dvořák noted that STAN could nominate its own candidate if it has stronger senate group than ODS-TOP 09. On 13 September Vystrčil stated he will run for the position if Civic Democratic Party-TOP 09 senate group is strong enough and nominates him. Members of ANO 2011 noted at the time that the party has ambition to replace Vystrčil but didnt discuss potential nominations. On 7 October 2026, leader of STAN Vít Rakušan admitted that his party might seek getting the position of the Senate President if it becomes the largest senate group.

== Potential candidates ==
- Martin Dvořák (STAN), former Minister of European Affairs
- Miloš Vystrčil (ODS), the incumbent President of the Senate.
- Jana Mračková Vildumetzová (ANO), Chairwoman of senate group.
