= 2020 President of the Senate of the Czech Republic election =

2020 President of the Senate of the Czech Republic election may refer to:

- February 2020 President of the Senate of the Czech Republic election.
- November 2020 President of the Senate of the Czech Republic election.
