= Jiří Růžička =

Jiří Růžička may refer to:

- Jiří Růžička (basketball)
- Jiří Růžička (politician)
