= Běhounek =

Běhounek (Czech pronunciation: [ˈbjɛɦounɛk]; feminine: Běhounková) is a Czech surname. It is a diminutive of the word běhoun. Notable people with the surname include:

- František Běhounek (1898–1973), Czech radiologist
- Jiří Běhounek (born 1952), Czech politician
- Jonas Behounek (born 1998), German footballer
- Kamil Běhounek (1916–1983), Czech jazz musician
