= Miluše Horská =

Czech senator and university educator (born 1959)

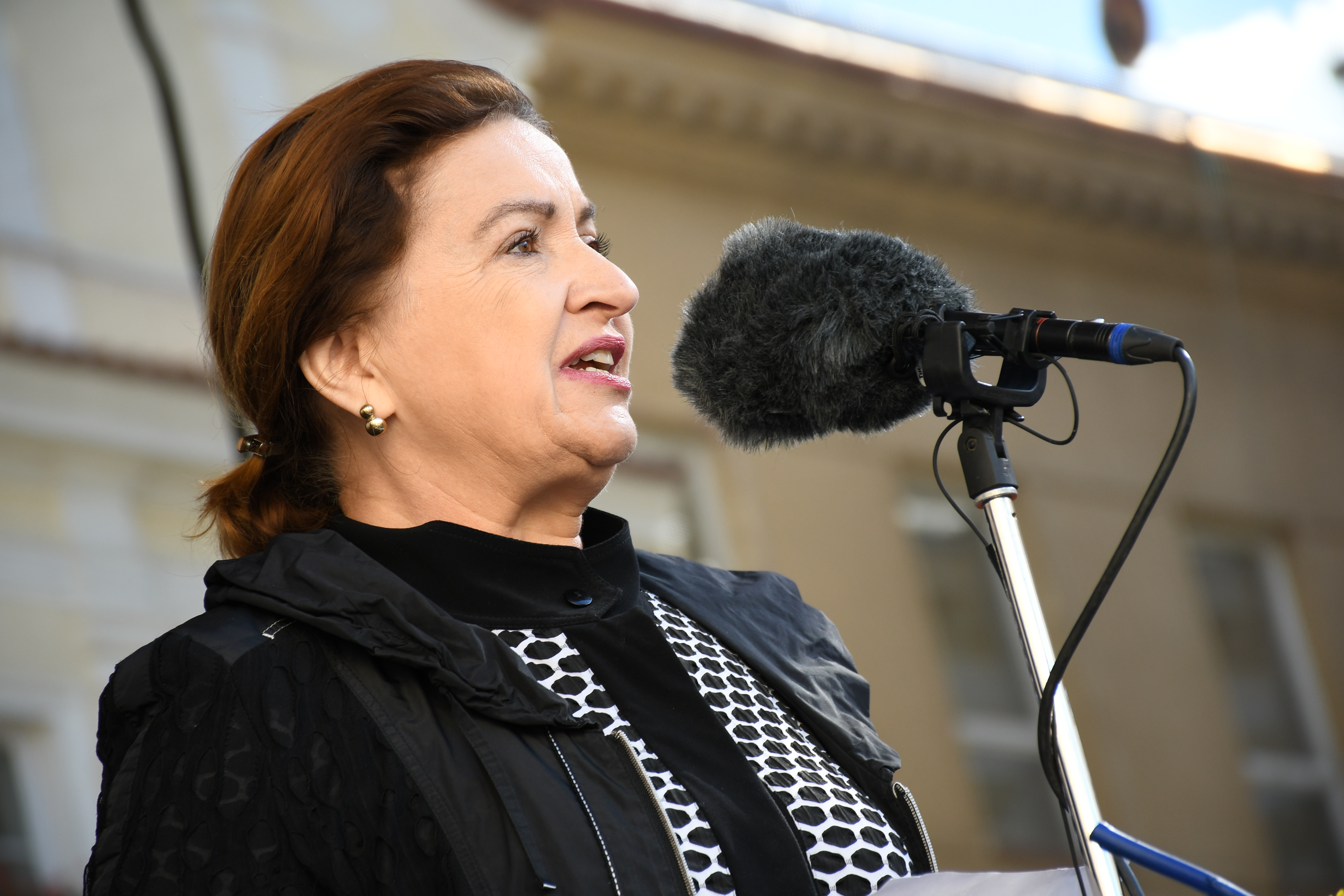
- Senator Horská in 2018

First Vice-President of the Senate of the Czech Republic
- In office 16 November 2016 – 14 November 2018
- Preceded by: Přemysl Sobotka
- Succeeded by: Jiří Růžička

Vice-President of the Senate of the Czech Republic
- Incumbent
- Assumed office 14 November 2018
- In office 5 December 2012 – 23 October 2016

Senator from Pardubice
- Incumbent
- Assumed office 23 October 2010
- Preceded by: Jiří Stříteský

Personal details
- Born: 26 April 1959 (age 67) Humpolec, Czechoslovakia
- Party: independent
- Education: University of South Bohemia
- Website: Official website

Miluše Horská (born 26 April 1959) is a Czech pedagogue and politician who has been Senator representing Pardubice since 2010. She was elected to the Senate in 2010 Election as an independent candidate. In Senate is she member of KDU-ČSL (the Catholic Party) and independents group.

She is also a principal of Elementary and Practical school Svítání (means "sunrise" in Czech) in Pardubice.

She was re-elected in 2016 Senate election with 27,28% votes in first round and with 70,29% votes in second round. After this election she was elected to the post of 1st Vice-President of the Senate.
