= 2018 Czech Senate election =

- 5–6 October 2018 (first round); 12–13 October 2018 (second round)

27 of the 81 seats in the Senate
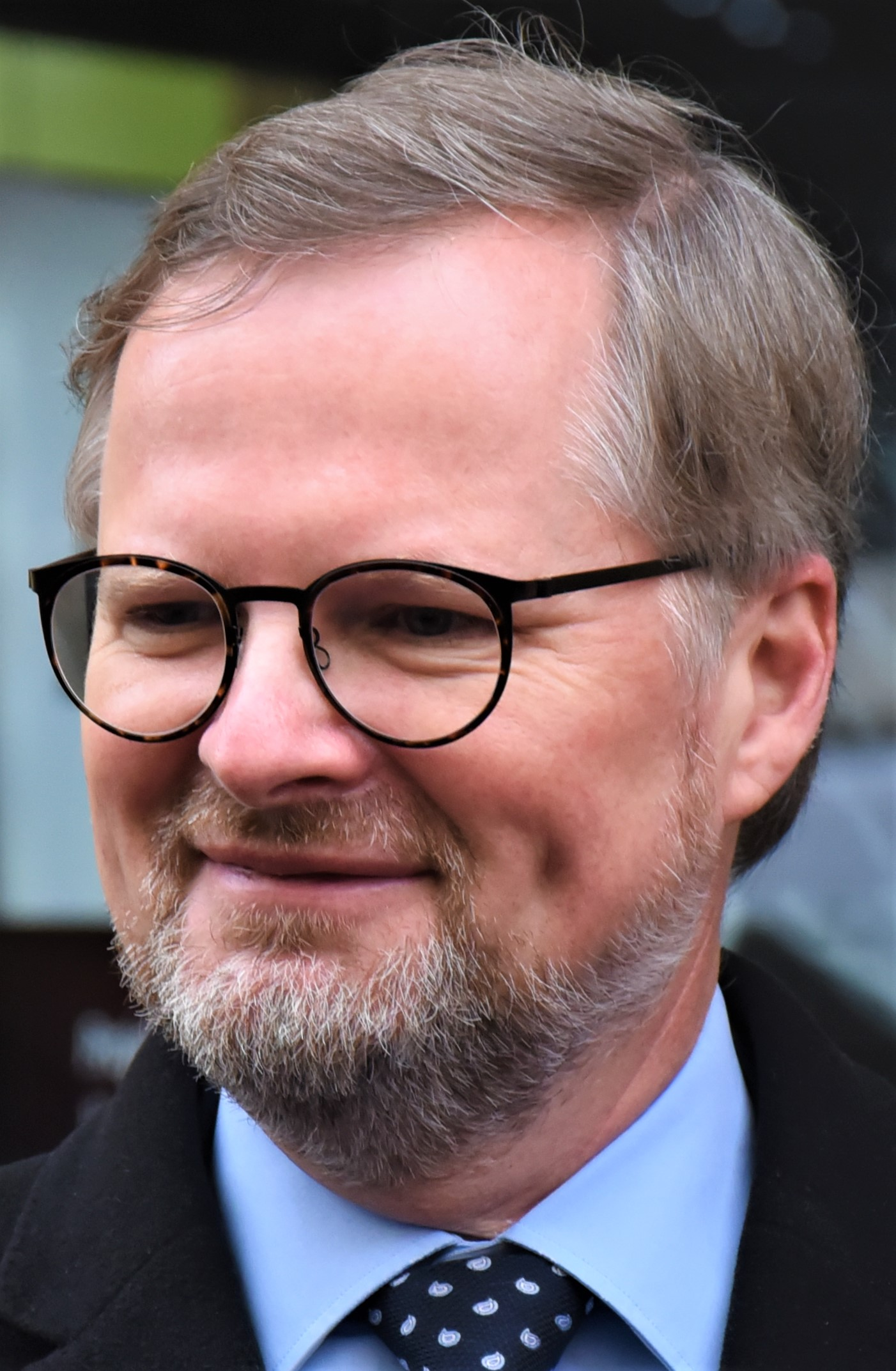

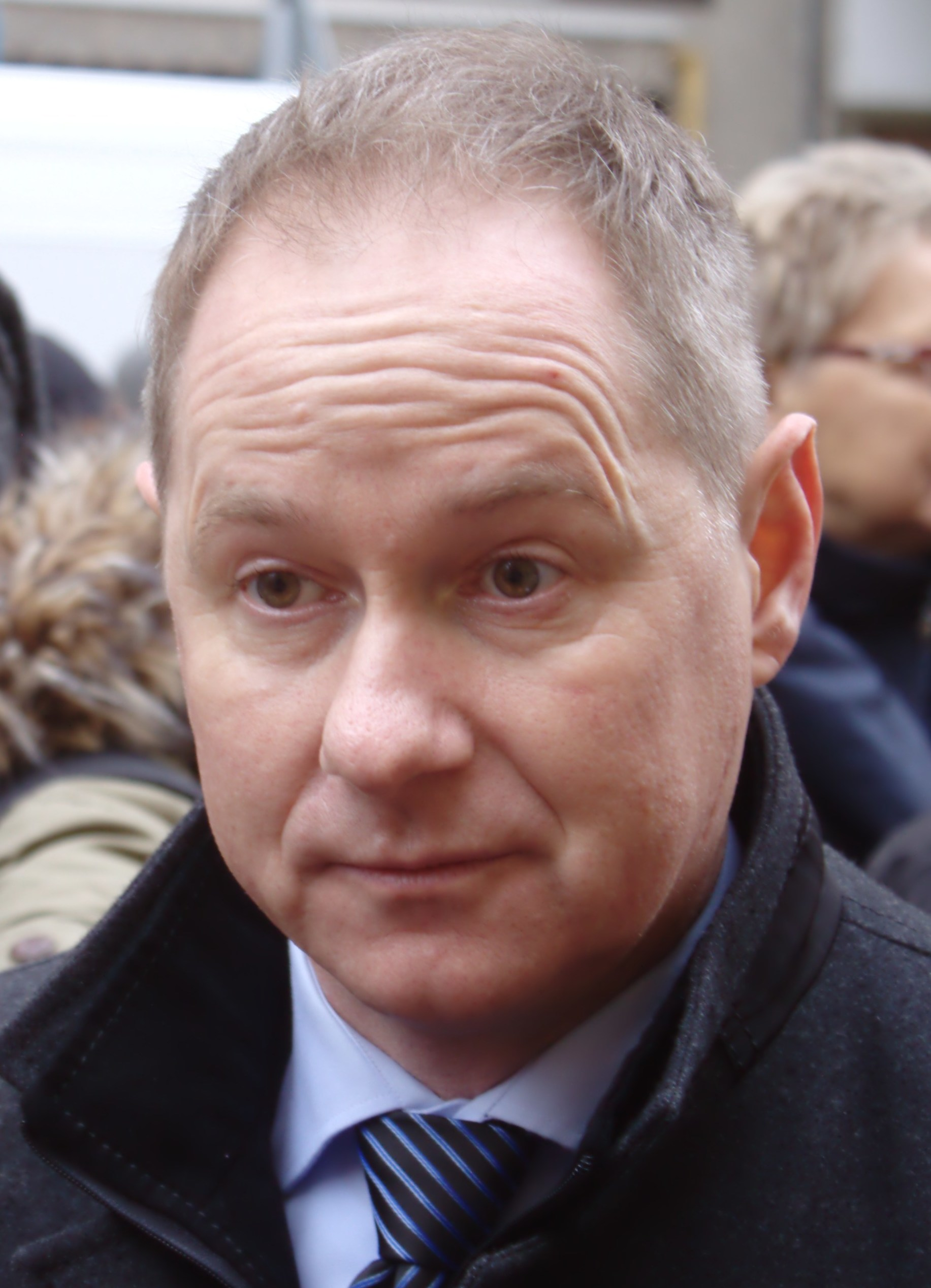

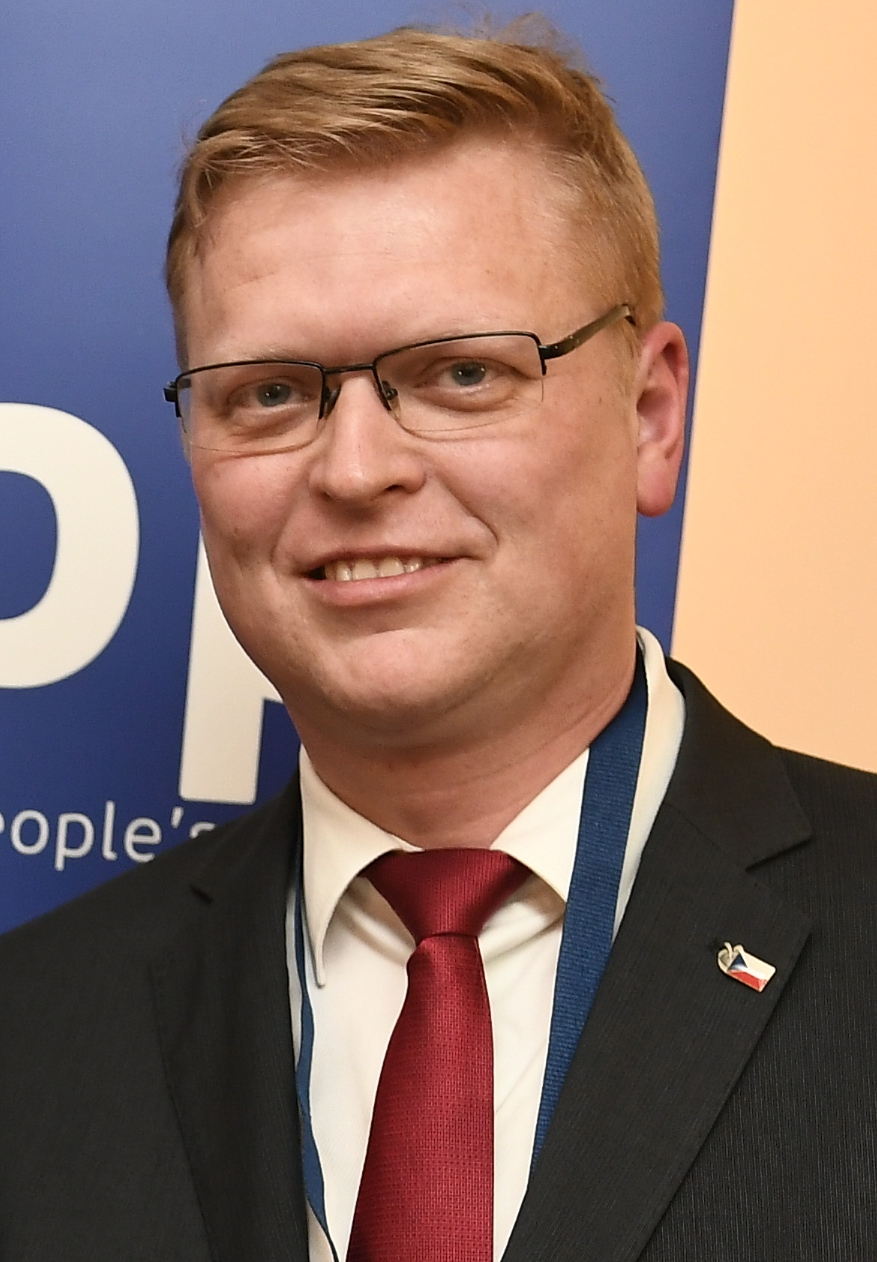

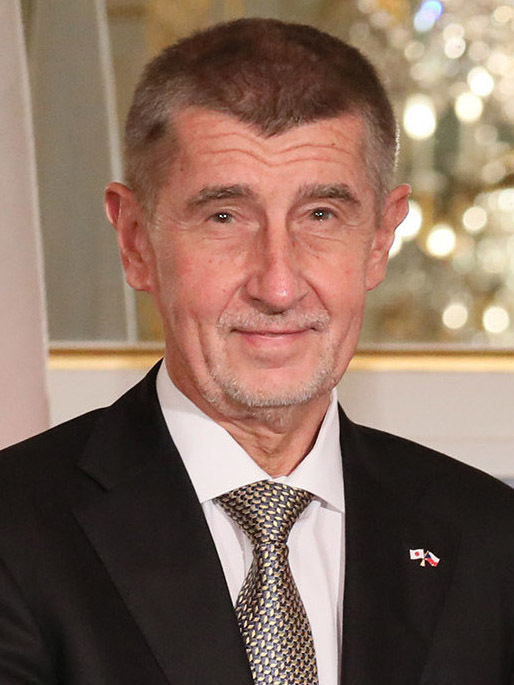

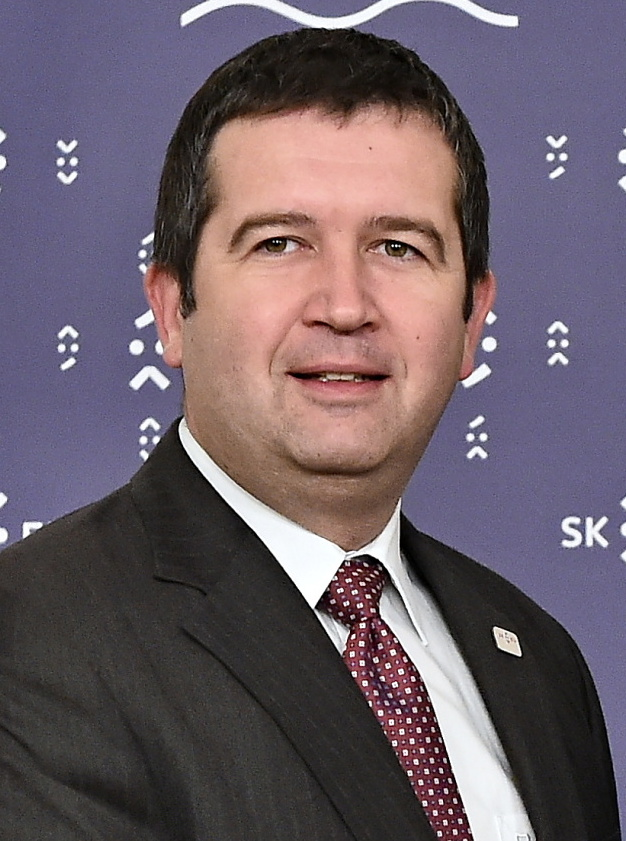

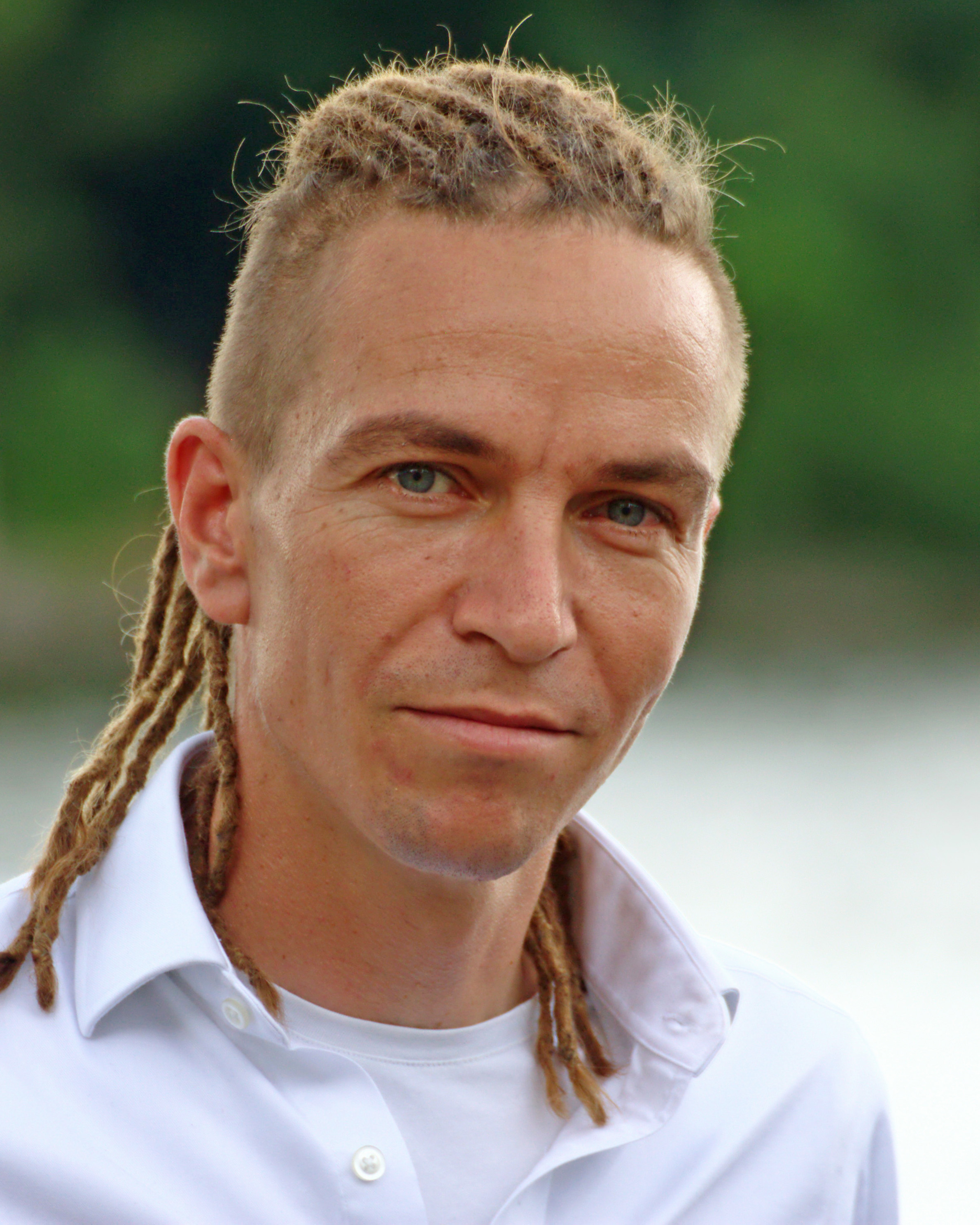
	First party	Second party	Third party
Leader	Petr Fiala	Petr Gazdík	Pavel Bělobrádek
Party	ODS	STAN	KDU-ČSL
Seats won	10	5	2
First round	163,630; 15.02%	79,025; 7.25%	99,383; 9.12%
Second round	116,376; 27.86%	47,317; 11.33%	34,833; 8.34%
	Fourth party	Fifth party	Sixth party
Leader	Andrej Babiš	Jan Hamáček	Ivan Bartoš
Party	ANO	ČSSD	Pirates
Seats won	1	1	1
First round	147,477; 13.53%	100,478; 9.22%	66,281; 6.08%
Second round	57,500; 13.76%	33,887; 8.11%	17,528; 4.20%

Senate elections were held in the Czech Republic on 5 and 6 October 2018 alongside municipal elections, with a second round held on 12 and 13 October 2018. The Conservative Civic Democratic Party (ODS) won the election with 10 seats. Governing parties ANO 2011 and the Czech Social Democratic Party were heavily defeated, winning only 1 seat each. The Communist Party lost its last seat in the Senate when Václav Homolka failed to be re-elected, meaning the party would be without representation in the Senate for the first time in the history of Czech Republic. The election was considered the first major win for the opposition to Andrej Babiš' Cabinet. Commentators including Josef Kopecký also noted ODS confirmed their position as the main opposition party, ahead of the Czech Pirate Party.

== Electoral system ==
One-third of the 81-member Senate is elected every two years, giving Senators six year terms. Members of the Senate are elected in single-member constituencies using the two-round system.

=== Composition of contested seats prior to the elections ===
Name	Ideology	Leader	Seats
Czech Social Democratic Party	Social democracy	Jan Hamáček	13 / 27
Civic Democratic Party	Conservatism	Petr Fiala	4 / 27
KDU-ČSL	Christian democracy	Pavel Bělobrádek	2 / 27
Mayors and Independents	Localism	Petr Gazdík	2 / 27
Independents			2 / 27
Communist Party of Bohemia and Moravia	Communism	Vojtěch Filip	1 / 27
Pirates	Pirate politics	Ivan Bartoš	1 / 27
Green Party	Green politics	Petr Štěpánek	1 / 27

=== List of contested districts ===
District	Incumbent	Standing for reelection
2 - Sokolov	Zdeněk Berka (ČSSD)	No
5- Chomutov	Václav Homolka (KSČM)	Yes
8 - Rokycany	Milada Emmerová (ČSSD)	Yes
11 - Domažlice	Jan Látka (ČSSD)	Yes
14 - České Budějovice	Jiří Šesták (STAN)	Yes
17 - Prague 12	Tomáš Grulich (ODS)	No
20 - Prague 4	Eva Syková (ČSSD)	Yes
23 - Prague 8	Daniela Filipiová (ODS)	No
26 - Prague 2	Libor Michálek (Piráti)	Yes
29 - Litoměřice	Hassan Mezian (ČSSD)	No
32 - Teplice	Jaroslav Kubera (ODS)	Yes
35 - Jablonec nad Nisou	Jaroslav Zeman (ODS)	Yes
38 - Mladá Boleslav	Jaromír Jermář (ČSSD)	No
41 - Benešov	Luděk Jeništa (TOP 09)	No
44 - Chrudim	Jan Veleba (SPOZ)	No
47 - Mladá Boleslav	Lubomír Franc (ČSSD)	No
50 - Svitavy	Radko Martínek (ČSSD)	No
53 - Třebíč	František Bublan (ČSSD)	No
56 - Břeclav	Jan Hajda (ČSSD)	Deceased prior to election
59 - Brno-City	Eliška Wagnerová (Zelení)	No
62 - Prostějov	Božena Sekaninová (ČSSD)	Yes
65 - Šumperk	Zdeněk Brož (KDU–ČSL)	Yes
68 - Opava	Vladimír Plaček (ČSSD)	Deceased prior to election
71 - Ostrava-City	Leopold Sulovský (Ostravak)	Yes
74 - Karviná	Petr Vícha (ČSSD)	Yes

== Campaign ==
The Senate election campaign ran parallel to the campaign for the municipal elections.

ANO 2011 launched their campaign on 3 September 2018. Babiš said that ANO was offering many highly qualified candidates, including Ivan Pilný and Eva Syková.

The Czech Social Democratic Party launched their campaign on 5 September 2018, focused on social issues.

The Civic Democratic Party (ODS) launched their campaign on 7 September 2018. Petr Fiala stated that the election would be a conflict of two worlds, with ODS representing the world of experienced candidates and ANO 2011 representing the world of repeated restarts.

== Election forecast ==
Media	Date	ANO	ODS	Piráti	SPD	KSČM	ČSSD	KDU–ČSL	TOP 09	STAN	Others	Notes
Election	12–13 Oct 2018	1	10	1	0	0	1	2	1	5	6	
Reflex	10 Oct 2018	3	8	0	0	0	2	2	2	4	4	
Aktuálně.cz	10 Oct 2018	1	7	1	0	0	2	4	1	5	6	
Eurozprávy.cz	7 Oct 2018	2	6	1	0	0	2	4	1	4	5	
1st round
Referendum	2 Oct 2018	5	5	1	0	1	3	4	1	4	4	
Hospodářské noviny	30 Sep 2018	5	3	1	0	0	4	4	1	4	5	based on betting odds
Novinky.cz	11 Sep 2018	4	4	1	0	0	5	4	1	3	5	based on betting odds

=== Campaign finances ===
Party	Money Spent	Source
ANO 2011	18,700,000 CZK	
Civic Democratic Party	15,600,000 CZK	
Freedom and Direct Democracy	12,700,000 CZK	
Czech Social Democratic Party	12,300,000 CZK	
Christian and Democratic Union – Czechoslovak People's Party	10,200,000 CZK	
Communist Party of Bohemia and Moravia	7,000,000 CZK	
Mayors and Independents	6,900,000 CZK	
TOP 09	6,300,000 CZK	
Czech Pirate Party	5,600,000 CZK	

== Results ==
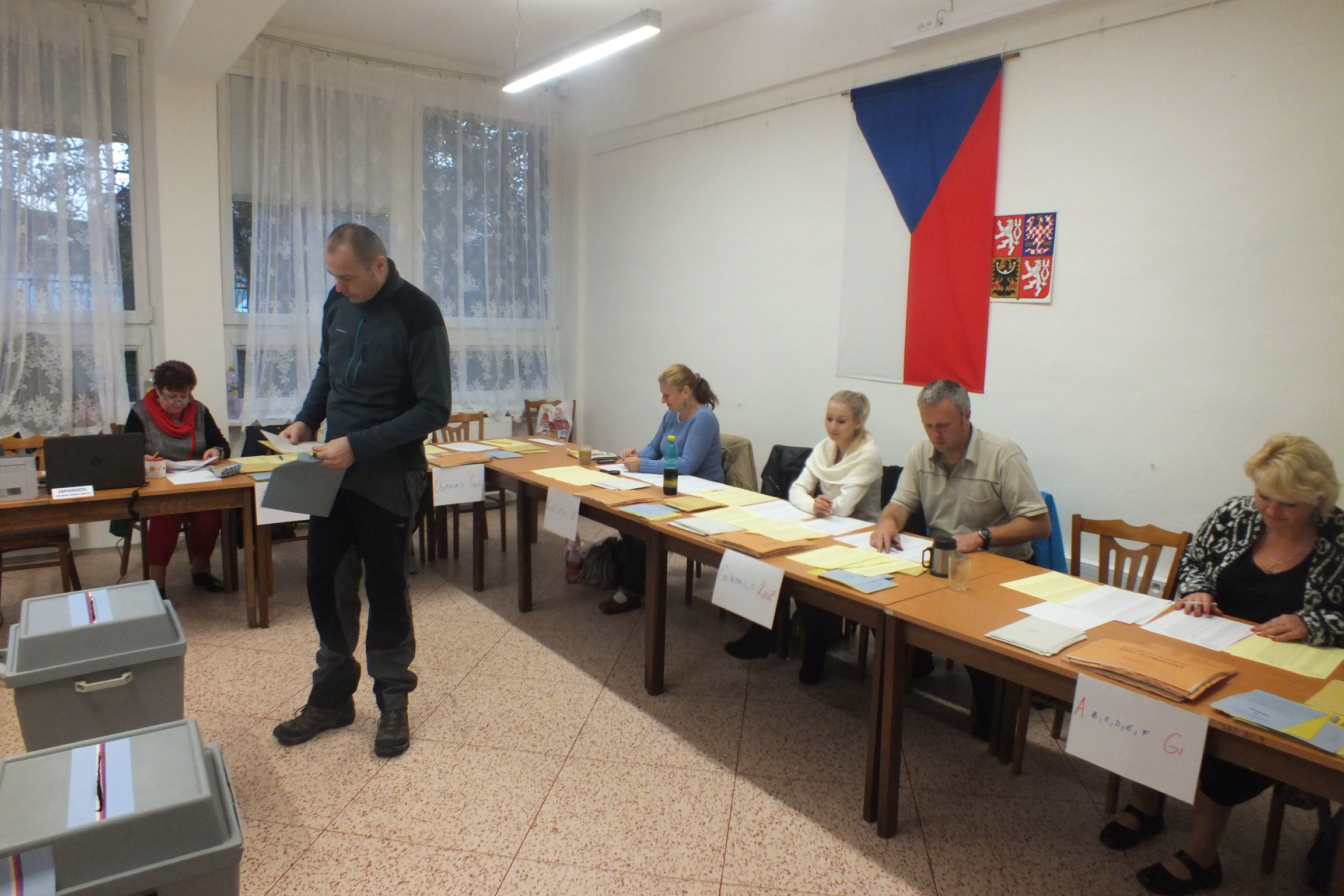
Polling station of the electoral district no. 70 in Olomouc during Czech Senate elections and the regional elections held in the Czech Republic on 7 October 2016

The Civic Democratic Party (ODS) was the most successful party in the first round, with 11 candidates proceeding to the second round. ANO 2011 had 10 candidates proceeding.

Nominating party	First round			Second round			Seats			
Nominating party	Votes	%	Seats	Votes	%	Seats	Won	Not up	Total	+/–
Civic Democratic Party	163,630	15.02	0	116,376	27.86	10	10	6	16	+7
ANO 2011	147,477	13.53	0	57,500	13.76	1	1	6	7	0
Czech Social Democratic Party	100,478	9.22	0	33,887	8.11	1	1	12	13	–12
KDU-ČSL	99,383	9.12	1	34,833	8.34	1	2	14	16	+2
Communist Party of Bohemia and Moravia	80,371	7.38	0	3,578	0.86	0	0	0	0	–1
Mayors and Independents	79,025	7.25	1	47,317	11.33	4	5	5	10	+5
Freedom and Direct Democracy	70,110	6.43	0				0	0	0	0
Czech Pirate Party	66,281	6.08	0	17,528	4.20	1	1	0	1	0
TOP 09	41,980	3.85	0	22,580	5.40	1	1	2	3	+1
Senator 21	33,860	3.11	0	24,250	5.80	1	1	5	6	New
Marek Hilšer for Senate	15,045	1.38	0	11,903	2.85	1	1	0	1	New
Freeholder Party of the Czech Republic	12,265	1.13	0	7,176	1.72	0	0	1	1	0
For Health	11,180	1.03	0				0	0	0	New
Realists	8,407	0.77	0				0	0	0	New
Party of Common Sense	7,186	0.66	0				0	0	0	0
Ostravak	6,178	0.57	0	4,906	1.17	1	1	0	1	0
Movement for Prague 11	4,980	0.46	0				0	1	1	0
New Future for Liberec Region	4,744	0.44	0				0	0	0	0
SNK European Democrats	4,446	0.41	0				0	0	0	0
Czech National Social Party	4,438	0.41	0				0	0	0	New
Pévéčko	3,425	0.31	0				0	0	0	New
Czech Sovereignty	3,300	0.30	0				0	0	0	New
Party of Civic Rights	3,286	0.30	0				0	0	0	–1
Party of Free Citizens	2,884	0.26	0				0	0	0	0
Moravian Land Movement	2,641	0.24	0				0	0	0	New
Ordinary Citizens	2,010	0.18	0				0	0	0	New
Green Party	1,818	0.17	0				0	1	1	–1
Moravian and Silesian Pirate Party	1,789	0.16	0				0	0	0	New
Moravané	1,484	0.14	0				0	0	0	0
Koruna Česká	1,443	0.13	0				0	0	0	0
Patriots of the Czech Republic	1,369	0.13	0				0	0	0	New
NE-VOLIM	1,346	0.12	0				0	0	0	New
Order of the Nation	1,172	0.11	0				0	0	0	0
Independents	1,061	0.10	0				0	0	0	0
Club of Committed Non-Party Members	1,001	0.09	0				0	0	0	New
Alternative for Czechia 2017	794	0.07	0				0	0	0	New
Party of State of Direct Democracy	499	0.05	0				0	0	0	New
Citizens of the Czech Republic	491	0.05	0				0	0	0	New
Alliance of National Forces	390	0.04	0				0	0	0	New
Enough is Enough	258	0.02	0				0	0	0	New
Roma Democratic Party	216	0.02	0				0	0	0	New
Nation Together	41	0.00	0				0	0	0	New
Independents	95,507	8.76	0	35,938	8.60	3	3	1	4	+2
Total	1,089,689	100.00	2	417,772	100.00	25	27	54	81	0
Valid votes	1,089,689	95.90		417,772	99.49					
Invalid/blank votes	46,573	4.10		2,151	0.51					
Total votes	1,136,262	100.00		419,923	100.00					
Registered voters/turnout	2,743,745	41.41		2,547,488	16.48					
Source: Volby
