= Institute of Chemical Process Fundamentals =

Czech research institute

Institute of Chemical Process Fundamentals of the CAS (ICPF CAS)
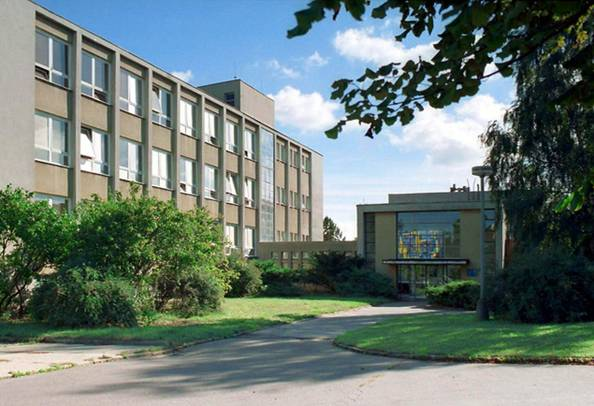
- ICPF main building
- Director: Ing. Michal Šyc, Ph.D.
- Address: ICPF CAS; Rozvojová 135; 165 02 Praha 6 Czech Republic
- Coordinates: 50.127°N 14.383°E
- Interactive map of Institute of Chemical Process Fundamentals of the CAS (ICPF CAS)
- Website: ICPF CAS

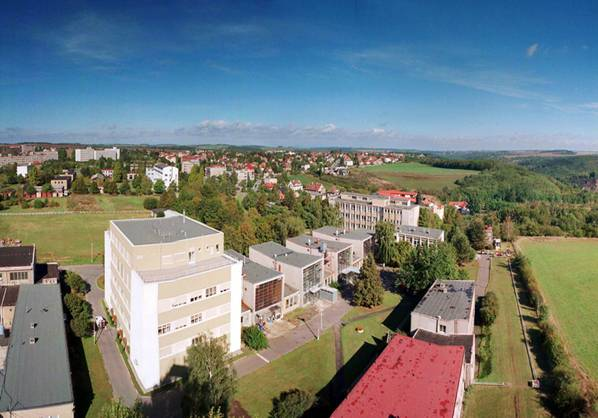
Aerial view of ICPF site Prague 6 - Suchdol

Institute of Chemical Process Fundamentals, Academy of Sciences of the Czech Republic, v.v.i. (Czech: Ústav chemických procesů Akademie věd České republiky) is one of the six institutes belonging to the CAS chemical sciences section and is a research centre in a variety of fields such as chemistry, biochemistry, catalysis and environment.

Its research topics include multiphase reaction systems for the design of chemical synthesis chemical processes and new materials development, energetics and protection of environment. Its national and international reputation is ascertained by its participation in EU financed research projects, such as EUCAARI or MULTIPRO. The MATINOES project was evaluated to belong to 20 best projects of the 6th Frame Programme.

== History ==
The institute was founded at the Czechoslovak Academy of Sciences in 1960 and, from its beginning, was intended to be a multidisciplinary research institution.

Its founder and first director, Professor Vladimír Bažant, was a chemical technologist with a broad perspective who valued modern concepts without which development of new processes would not be possible. This led him to invite Professor George L. Standart, a chemical engineer and a US native, who paved the way for the development of chemical engineering in the former Czechoslovakia in the 1950s and 60s. Chemical engineering research could not be done without a solid base in physical chemistry. This field of research was brought into the institute by the arrival in 1964 of Professor Eduard Hála and his team of physical chemists to the newly built site in the Prague suburban area of Suchdol-Lysolaje.

Gradually new branches of chemical engineering and chemical technology research were being developed such as reaction engineering, homogeneous catalysis, studies of Non-Newtonian fluids, sublimation, separation processes, dynamics and control of chemical systems etc. Most of these new topics were introduced as necessary support to a large and long-term project of development of a complete production technology of terephthalic acid a polyesters.

In 1989 several restructurings had been carried out that lead to a gradual decrease of staff by 50%. The research was rationalized into today's institute's structure.

== Present ==
The institute of chemical process fundamentals research activities currently include the theory of chemical processes especially in chemical engineering, physical chemistry, chemical technology and environmental engineering.

== Main research activities ==
- molecular theory and computer simulations of fluid systems
- thermodynamics of fluid systems, PVT behaviour of pure compounds and mixtures and phase equilibrium
- research and development of microreactors
- fundamentals of processes using supercritical fluids
- advanced catalytical processes, morphology, and properties of catalysts, preparation of catalysts
- study and preparation of nanomaterials and nanofibers
- texture of porous substances and transport phenomena in porous substances
- membrane separations, pervaporation a permeation
- study and application of biocatalysts, bioremediation
- structure, reactivity and catalytic activity of organometallic complexes
- NMR spectroscopy
- fluidized bed combustion and gasification
- photochemical reactions in microwave field and microwave technology
- fluid dynamics and transport phenomena in multiphase systems
- rheologic properties of microdispersions and liquids
- aerosol chemistry and physics
- laser-induced chemical reactions and aerosol processes for preparation of new compounds and composites

== Organization structure ==
=== Management ===
- Director: Ing. Michal Šyc, Ph.D.
- Chairman of Institute Board: Dr. Ing. Vladimír Ždímal
- Scientific Secretary: Ing. Vladimír Církva, Dr.

=== Research departments ===
1. Department of Membrane Separation Processes - Head: Ing. Pavel Izák, Ph.D., DSc.
2. Department of Aerosols Chemistry and Physics - Head: Dr. Ing. Vladimír Ždímal
3. Department of Catalysis and Reaction Engineering - Head: Ing. Olga Šolcová, CSc.
4. Department of Multiphase Reactors - Head: Doc. Ing. Marek Růžička, CSc.
5. Department of Analytical Chemistry - Head: Ing. Jan Sýkora, Ph.D.
6. Department of Environmental Engineering - Head: Ing. Michal Šyc, Ph.D.
7. Department of Molecular and Mesoscopic Modelling - Head: prof. Ing. Lísal Martin, DSc.
8. Department of Laser Chemistry - Head: RNDr. Radek Fajgar, CSc.
9. Department of Advanced Materials and Organic Synthesis - Head: Ing. Jan Storch, Ph.D.
10. Department of Bioorganic Compounds and Nanocomposites - Head: Ing. Tomáš Strašák, Ph.D.

=== Supervisory board ===
- Prof. Ing. Vladimír Mareček, DrSc. - chairman

=== Institute board ===
- Dr. Ing. Vladimír Ždímal – chairman

== Postgraduate studies ==
Postgraduate studies are accredited by the Ministry of Education, Youth, and Sports of the Czech Republic for mutual programmes of ICPF and all the faculties of ICT Prague and other faculties of Czech universities in the following fields:

- Chemical engineering
- Physical chemistry
- Organic technology
- Organic chemistry
- Inorganic chemistry
- Biotechnology
- Chemistry and technology of environmental protection

== Research projects ==
ICPF research teams are currently working on dozens of interesting basic and applied scientific projects financed both from national and foreign resources. Selected topics in the following list show the broadness and multi-disciplinarity of the research carried out in the institute's laboratories:

- F3 Factory - Flexible, fast and future production processes
- Study of polymeric membrane swelling and make use of this effect for increasing its permeability
- Separation of volatile organic compounds from air
- Optimization of supercritical fluid extraction for maximal yield of biologically active substances from plants
- Determination of the phase and state behaviour of fluids and fluid mixtures for process-es at superambient conditions: molecular-based theory and experiment
- Computer modelling of structural, dynamical and transport properties of fluids in nanospace
- Preparation of hierarchic nanomaterials
- HUGE2 - Hydrogen Oriented Underground Coal Gasification for Europe - Environmental and Safety Aspects
- Special catalytic processes and materials
- Modern theoretical methods for the analysis of chemical bonding
- Supported oxidic catalysts containing low amount of active species as catalysts for N2O decomposition
- Reactive chemical barriers for decontamination of heavily polluted waters
- Removing endocrine disruptors from wastewaters and drinking water using photocatalytic and biological processes
- Transport and reaction processes in complex multiphase systems
- Determination of the coalescence efficiency of bubbles in liquids
- Wall effect in flowing microdisperse liquids: apparent slip and electrokinetical potential
- Novel inorganic-organic hybrid nanomaterials
- Releasing hydrogen on formation of chemical bonds catalysed by titanium complexes
- Whole-cell optical sensors
- Preparation of helicene-based chiral stationary phases for HPLC
- FLEXGAS - Near zero advanced fluidised bed gasification
- Advanced methods of fluid and burner coal and biomass co-gasification
- Waste as raw material and energy source
- Development and validation of thermal desorption technology using microwave radiation
- EUSAAR - European Supersites for Atmospheric Aerosol Research
- Influence of surface processes and electromagnetic radiation on transfer phenomena in aerosol systems with nanoparticles and porous bodies with nanopores
- Development and application of new experimental methods to measure heterogeneous particles in superheated steam
- Preparation of Ti/O/Si based photocatalysts by laser induced CVD and sol-gel technique

== See also ==
- Academy of Sciences of the Czech Republic
