= Jiří Běhounek =

Czech politician

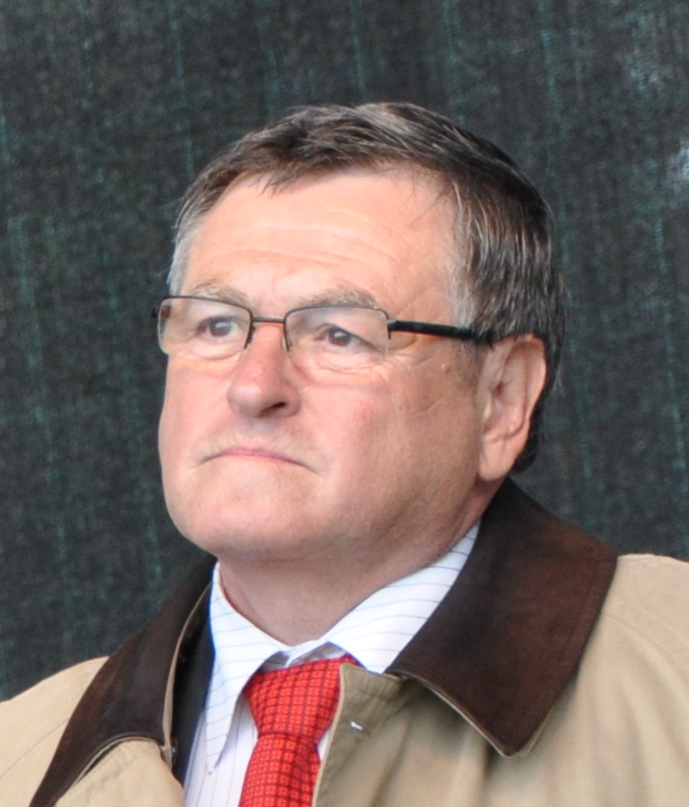
- Běhounek in 2013

Vice-Chairman of ČSSD
- In office 9 April 2021 – 10 December 2021

Governor of the Vysočina Region
- In office 14 November 2008 – 18 November 2020
- Preceded by: Miloš Vystrčil
- Succeeded by: Vítězslav Schrek

Member of the Chamber of Deputies
- In office 26 October 2013 – 21 October 2021

Personal details
- Born: 13 May 1952 (age 74) Prague, Czechoslovakia
- Party: KSČ (1985–1989), SOCDEM (2021–present)
- Education: Charles University
- Occupation: medical doctor; politician

Jiří Běhounek (born 13 May 1952) is a Czech medical doctor and politician. He served as the governor of the Vysočina Region from November 2008 to November 2020 and Member of the Chamber of Deputies (MP) from October 2013 to October 2021.
