= February 2020 President of the Senate of the Czech Republic election =

2020 President of the Senate of the Czech Republic election
- 19 February 2020
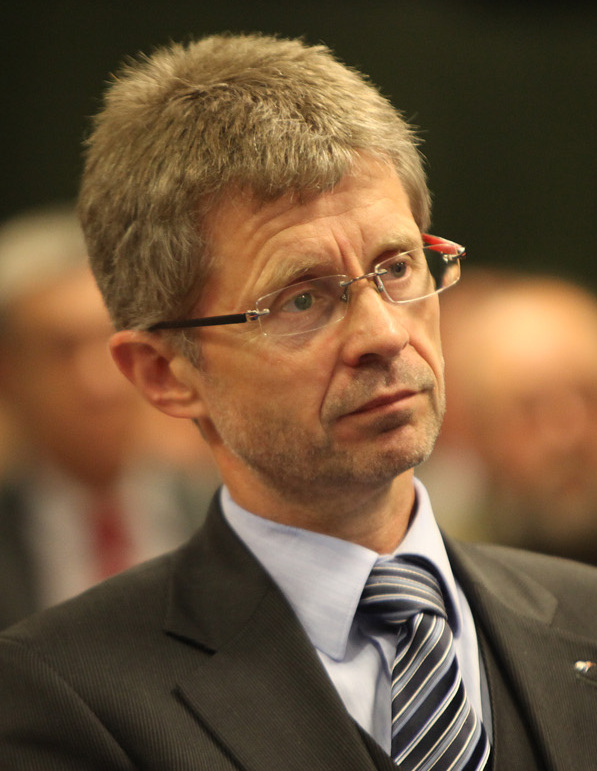

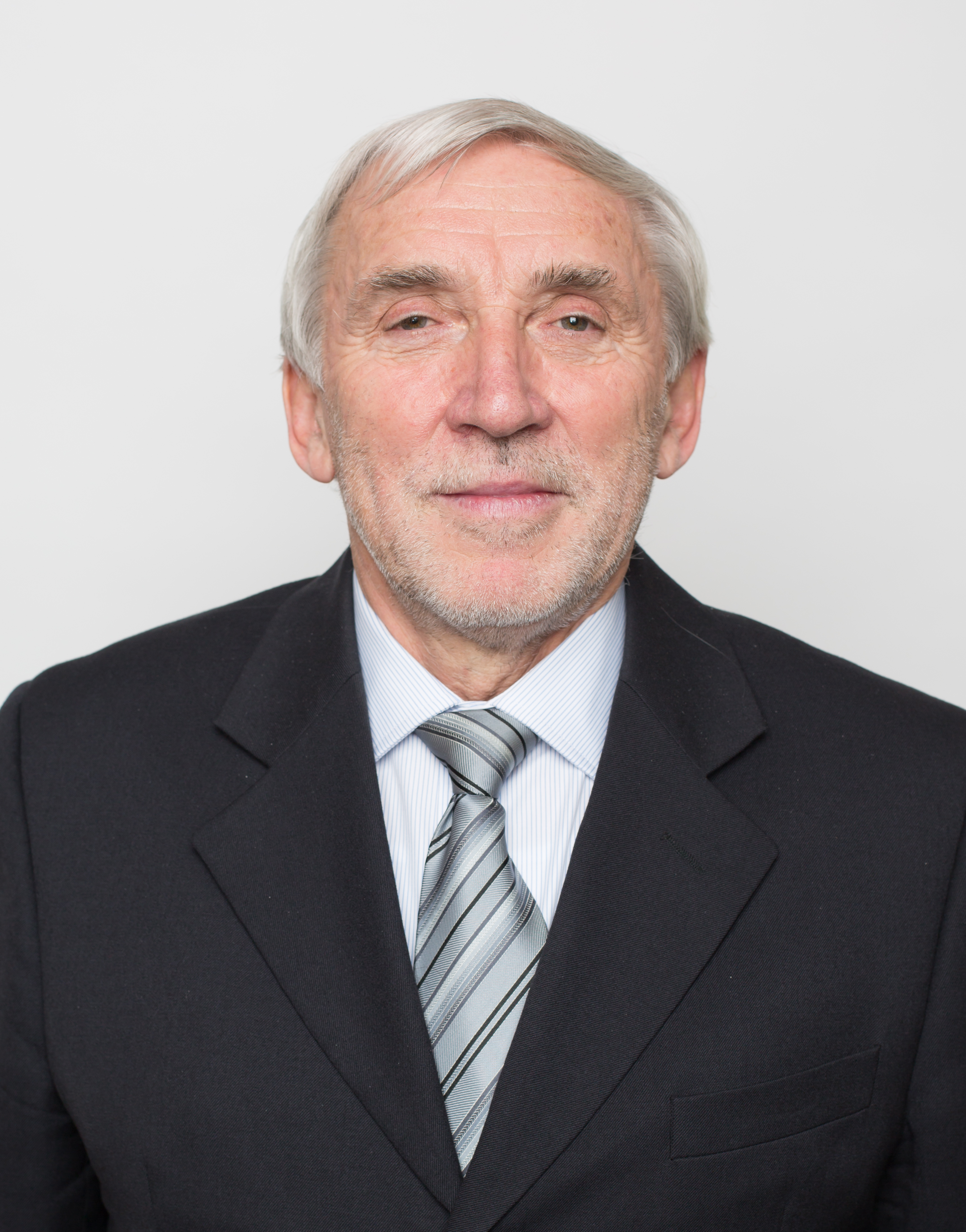
Candidate	Miloš Vystrčil	Jiří Růžička
Party	ODS	TOP 09
Popular vote	52	21
Percentage	68.4%	27.3%
President before election
Jiří Růžička (acting)
TOP 09
Elected President
Miloš Vystrčil
ODS

Election of the President of the Senate of the Czech Republic was held on 19 February 2020 following death of incumbent President Jaroslav Kubera. Civic Democratic Party nominated Miloš Vystrčil for the position of the new Senate President while the Mayors and Independents nominated the acting President Jiří Růžička. Vystrčil won the election with 52 votes against Růžička's 21 votes.

== Background ==
Jaroslav Kubera was elected the new President of the Senate in 2018. He served as the President until his death on 20 January 2020. First quick talks about his possible successor started soon afterwards. Some voices within the Senate stated that the position of the President should remain the Civic Democratic Party. Member of Mayors and Independents Senate caucus Jan Horník stated that his caucus will seek to get the seat of the President of the Senate noting Jiří Růžička as possible candidate. Růžička himself declared his interest. Independent senator Jitka Chalánková joined Senate caucus of the Civic Democratic Party following Kubera's death to support party's claim for the position of the President of the Senate.

Organisational Committee of Senate held meeting on 21 January 2020 to talk a term of the election and possible successor. It resulted with decision to not talk about Kubera's successor until Kubera is buried.

Miloš Vystrčil was nominated by the Civic Democratic Party on 4 February 2020. His candidacy was endorsed by KDU-ČSL. Mayors and Independents on the other hand nominated Jiří Růžička. Vystrčil and Růžička met on common press conference on 5 February 2020 to express their respect for each other and tell their vision on what kind of President of the Senate they want to be. Růžička stated that he wants to be above political parties and serve more as an independent President while Vystrčil statte he wants to continue in Kubera's work and to give to the position of the President an added value. ANO 2011 announced on 5 February that it will support Vystrčil's candidacy. Czech Social Democratic Party gave its support to Miloš Vystrčil on 6 February 2020. Senator 21 decided to endorse neither Candidate. Leader of Senator 21 Václav Láska stated that he considers both of them Good Candidates. In February 2020 Mayors and Independents (STAN) leadership endorsed Vystrčil for the position of the Senate President despite the fact that its Senate caucus nominated Růžička. STAN leadership called Růžička to withdraw from the election. Růžička refused to withdraw from election noting that some senators reportedly told him they won't vote by their party endorsement giving Růžička chance to win.

Růžička and Vystrčil met for a Debate on 18 February 2020. They both agreed that Senate is an important balance of Czech constitutional system. They also stated that the election isn't as fatal as many believe it to be.

== Candidates ==
Candidate name and age	Political party	Details
Jiří Růžička (71)	TOP 09	Senator for Prague 6 and acting President of the Senate.
Miloš Vystrčil (59)	Civic Democratic Party	Senator for Jihlava and Chairman of Senate caucus.

== Composition of Senate ==
Name	Ideology	Senate Leader	Seats	Supported candidate
Civic Democratic Party	Conservatism	Miloš Vystrčil	18 / 81	Miloš Vystrčil
Mayors and Independents	Localism	Jan Horník	19 / 81	Jiří Růžička
KDU-ČSL	Christian democracy	Petr Šilar	15 / 81	Miloš Vystrčil
Czech Social Democratic Party	Social democracy	Petr Vícha	13 / 81	Miloš Vystrčil
ANO 2011	Centrism	Zdeňka Hamousová	7 / 81	Miloš Vystrčil
SEN 21	Liberalism	Václav Láska	6 / 81	
Independents			2 / 81	
Vacant			1 / 81	

== Opinion polls and surveys ==
Date	Agency	Miloš Vystrčil	Jiří Růžička	None
12–18 February 2020	iDnes	33.70%	14.92%	51.38%

== Voting ==
Voting was held on 19 February 2020. 4 Senators excused themselves from election. Vystrčil received 52 votes of 76 and became the new President.

Candidate	Party	Votes	
Miloš Vystrčil	Civic Democratic Party	52 / 76	68.42%
Jiří Růžička	TOP 09	21 / 76	27.63%
None		3 / 76	3.95%

== Aftermath ==
Vystrčil stated that he considers it a Grand Honor to become the President of the Senate. Růžička admitted that he expected to receive more votes but congratulated Vystrčil stating that he believes Vystrčil will be a President who will fight for a good name of the Senate. He also expressed his Pleasure that the election was held Gentlemanly.

== See also ==
- 2020 Teplice by-election
