= Eva Syková =

Czech senator of Czech Parliament, doctor, professor and scientist

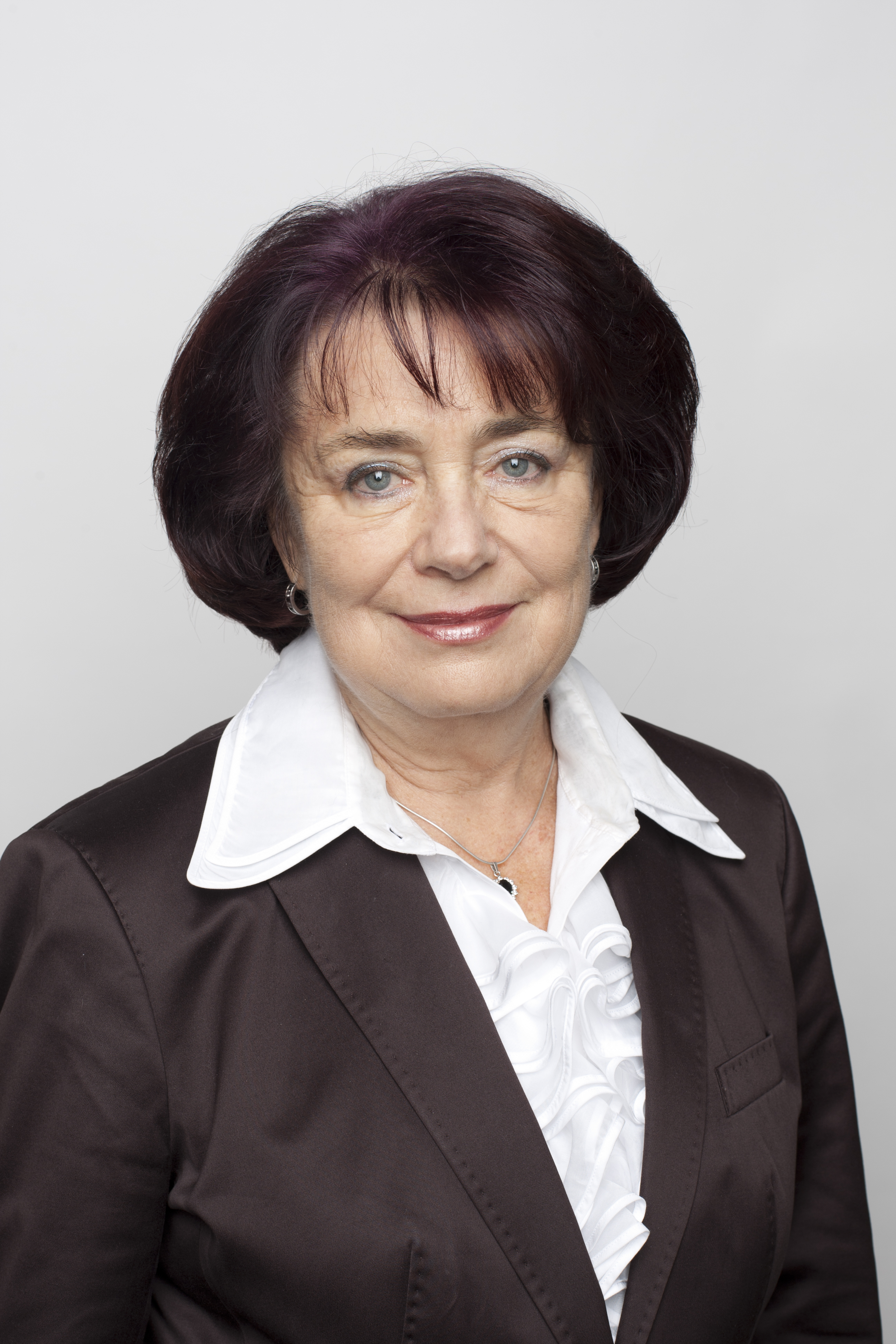

Senator from Prague 4
- In office 20 October 2012 – 20 October 2018
- Preceded by: Tomáš Töpfer
- Succeeded by: Jiří Drahoš

Director of Institute of Experimental Medicine
- In office 2001–2016
- Preceded by: Josef Syka
- Succeeded by: Miroslava Anděrová

Personal details
- Born: 24 July 1944 (age 82) Rožmitál pod Třemšínem, Protectorate of Bohemia and Moravia
- Education: Charles University

Eva Syková (born 24 July 1944) is a Czech neuroscientist whose research focused on the origins, mechanisms and maintenance of ionic and volume homeostasis in the central nervous system and the role of extrasynaptic transmission, spinal cord injury. She is currently leading several clinical studies, including a Phase I/II study in patients with spinal cord injury as well as ongoing clinical studies of patients with amyotrophic lateral sclerosis and ischemic leg injury. She was director of Institute of Experimental Medicine and the head of the Center for Cell Therapy and Tissue Repair at Charles University in Prague. Syková is author of 421 publications and co-holder of 7 patents with an H-index of 50.

== Publications ==
- Ion-selective microelectrodes and their use in excitable tissues, 1980
- Ionic and volume in the microenvironment of nerve and receptor cells, 1992
