= Jaroslav Kubera =

Czech politician (1947–2020)

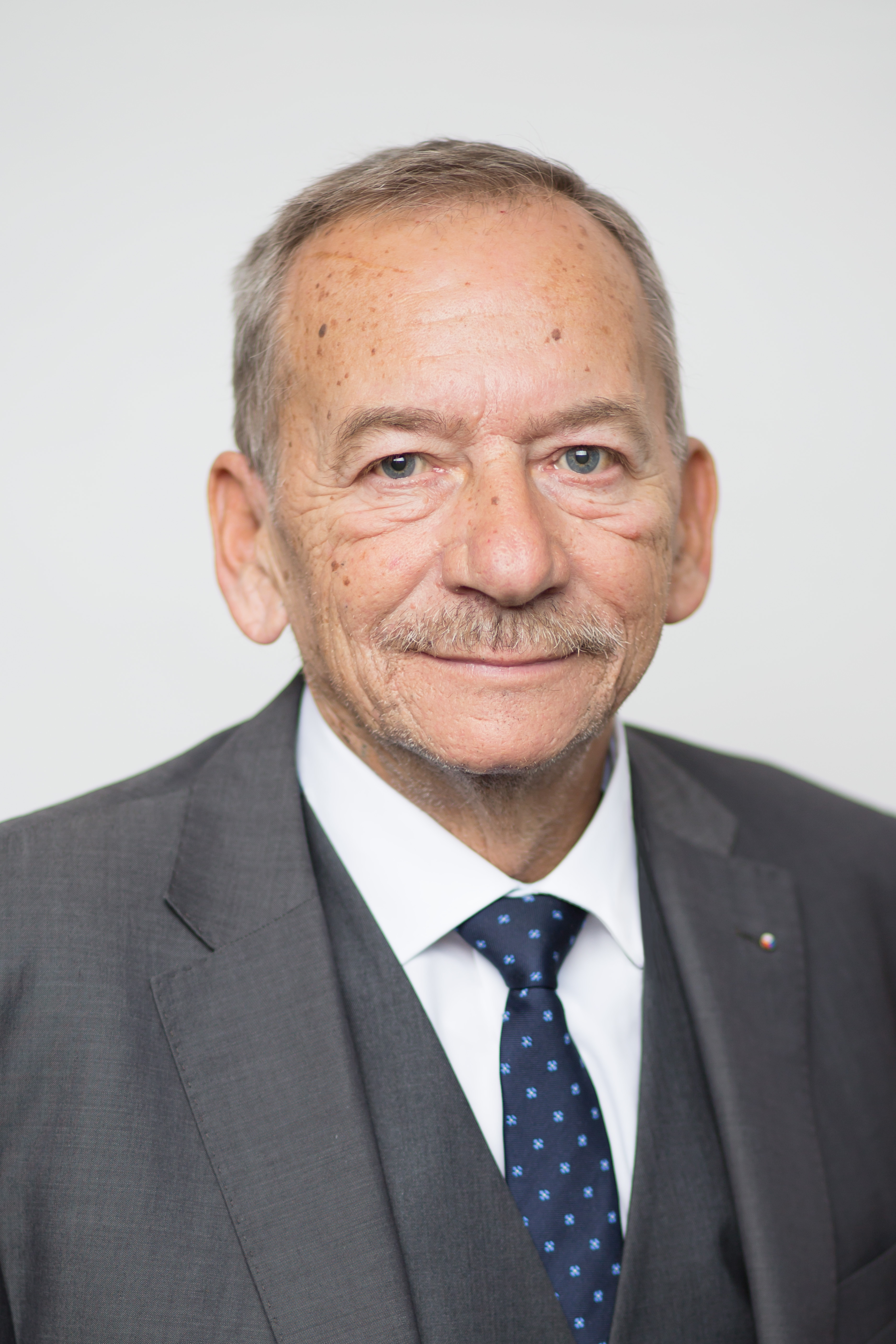
- Official portrait, 2019

7th President of the Czech Senate
- In office 14 November 2018 – 20 January 2020
- Vice President: Jiří Růžička
- Preceded by: Milan Štěch
- Succeeded by: Jiří Růžička (acting)

Vice President of the Czech Senate
- In office 19 November 2016 – 14 November 2018
- President: Milan Štěch
Parliamentary offices
Leader of the Civic Democratic Party in the Czech Senate
In office 23 October 2012 – 8 November 2016
Leader	Petr Nečas; Petr Fiala
Preceded by	Richard Svoboda
Succeeded by	Miloš Vystrčil

Senator of the Czech Republic
- In office 19 November 2000 – 20 January 2020
- Preceded by: Jaroslav Musial
- Succeeded by: Hynek Hanza
- Constituency: Teplice

Mayor of Teplice
- In office 1994 – 2 November 2018
- Preceded by: Karel Feix
- Succeeded by: Hynek Hanza

Personal details
- Born: 16 February 1947 Louny, Czechoslovakia (now Czech Republic)
- Died: 20 January 2020 (aged 72) Ústí nad Labem, Czech Republic
- Party: ODS

Jaroslav Kubera (16 February 1947 – 20 January 2020) was a Czech politician for the Civic Democratic Party, who served in the Czech Senate representing Teplice from 2000 and the Senate President from 2018 until his death in 2020. He previously served as mayor of Teplice from 1994 to 2018.

Kubera was a potential candidate in the 2018 presidential election, gathering enough support from fellow senators to register his candidacy, before deciding not to run.

He died on 20 January 2020 after suffering a heart attack, becoming the first high-ranking Czech official to die in office.

== Early life and career ==
Kubera was born in Louny on 16 February 1947. He studied mathematics at Masaryk University and business at the University of Economics, Prague, but did not complete his studies. Kubera stated that he left school due to impatience. He subsequently worked at Sklo Union Teplic and the business department of Elektrosvit Teplice. In 1990 he started working at the municipal bureau in Teplice.

== Political career ==
=== Mayor of Teplice ===
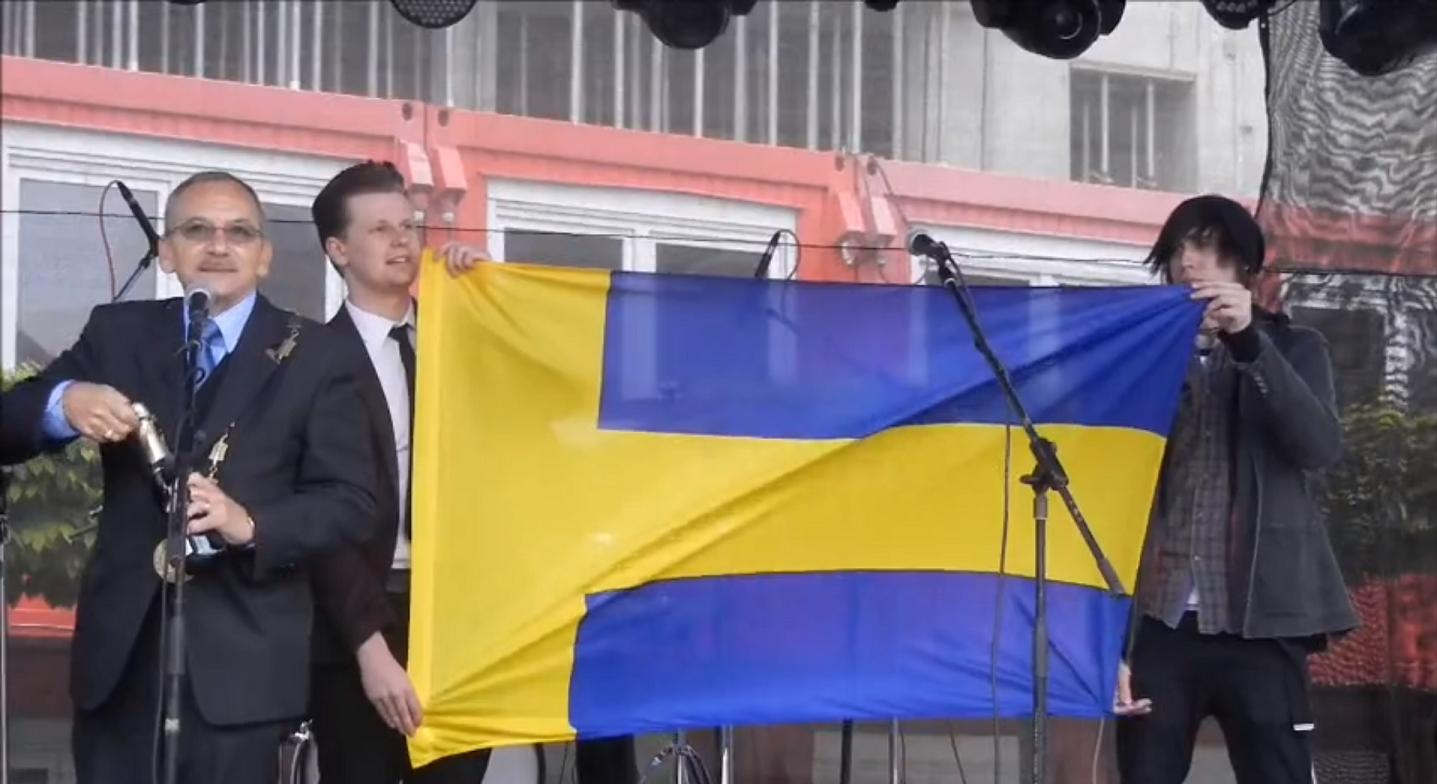
Kubera christening the new flag of Teplice in 2013.

In 1992, Kubera joined the Civic Democratic Party (ODS) and led the party in the Teplice municipal election in 1994, becoming the mayor of Teplice. He served six terms as the mayor.

As mayor, Kubera received media attention for his measures to address crime and his attempts to regulate prostitution. He privatised some municipal companies, including the public transport company, making Teplice the only town in the Czech Republic without a publicly owned transport company.

Kubera led ODS to victory for the last time in the 2018 municipal election, and subsequently negotiated a coalition with ANO 2011, before stepping down as mayor to be succeeded by his colleague Hynek Hanza.

=== Senator ===
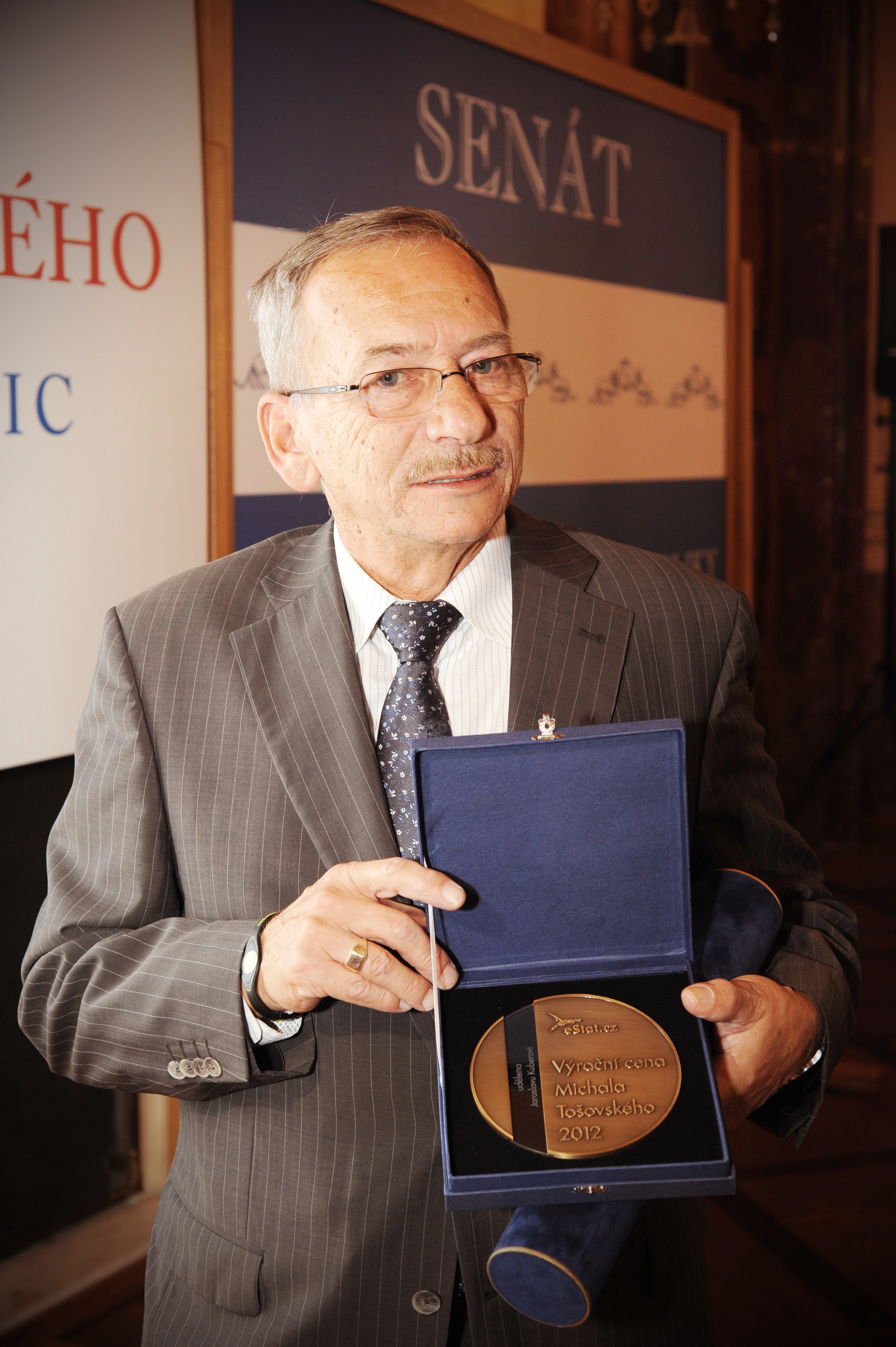
Kubera in 2012, after receiving the Michal Tošovský Anti-Bureaucratic Award

Kubera ran for the Senate in the 1998 Senate election. He finished first in the first round with 33% of the vote, advancing to the second round against Jaroslav Musial, who had received 19% in the first round. However, Musial won the second round by 5%, in Kubera's only electoral defeat.

Kubera ran for Senate again in 2000. Opinion polls conducted prior to the election placed him as a front-runner alongside Communist candidate Oldřich Bubeníček and Social Democratic candidate Valtr Komárek. An opinion poll published on 23 October 2000 saw Kubera with 29% support, against Bubeníček with 23% and Komárek with 18%. An opinion poll published on 1 November 2000 saw Kubera with 26% against Bubeníček and Komárek on 18%. Kubera eventually won 30% of the vote against Bubeníček's 27% and Komárek's 15%, defeating Bubeníček in the runoff with 56.5% to become a senator. As Senator, Kubera focused on similar topics as he worked on in municipal politics.

Kubera ran for re-election in 2006, winning the first round with 41% against Oldřich Bubeníček's 20%. He then defeated Bubeníček in the second round with 61% of votes.

Kubera ran for a third term in 2012. Although ODS suffered heavy losses during the 2012 Senate and regional elections in North Bohemia, Kubera received 40.5% of votes and advanced to the second round with Jaroslav Dubský, who had 18.5%. Kubera won a landslide victory in the second round with 67% of the votes. Following the election, Kubera became the Chairman of the ODS Senate Caucus.

Although he considered not running for reelection, Kubera ran for a fourth term in 2018. His main challengers were TOP 09 nominee Pavel Šedlbauer and Senator 21 nominee Zdeněk Bergman. He received 41% of votes, advancing to face Bergman, who got 21%. Kubera received 55.6% of votes in the second round and was reelected.

=== 2018 presidential election ===
On 22 August 2015, Kubera announced that he was considering running for president in 2018, but said he would wait to see who else was running and then decide. In February 2017, he said that his candidacy would also depend on whether his wife wanted to be the first lady. On 20 July 2017 Kubera announced that his candidacy had the signatures of 15 senators from ODS, the Social Democratic Party, ANO 2011, Christian and Democratic Union – Czechoslovak People's Party, the Freeholder Party and independents, as well as an endorsement from Přemysl Sobotka, who had run for the presidency in 2013. Kubera said that he would decide after the 2017 legislative election.

On 22 July 2017, in an interview with Aktuálně.cz, Kubera stated that he would decide whether he was running when he knew who his opponents would be. He stated that he had 19 signatures and would keep gathering signatures among senators. He was also very critical of the announced candidates. When asked about Jiří Drahoš, he said that "there are many renowned scientists, but being a president is a political office even though some people might not realise that. The President should care about the Czech Republic, which doesn't mean he should not be in touch with foreign countries, but the focus of his activities should be here at home". He was also critical of the idea that society can be led the same way as a state, saying that politics and society are too complicated to "be expressed by mathematical calculation." On 9 October 2017, Kubera stated that he was unlikely to run, and on 25 October 2017 he confirmed that he would not run.

=== President of the Senate ===
After the 2018 Senate election, Kubera announced his candidacy for the President of the Senate as the nominee of ODS. Political scientists such as Jan Gruber and Lukáš Jelínek viewed Kubera's chances as low, and considered Václav Hampl to be the frontrunner. Kubera's chance grew following negotiations with a smaller Senate faction. The election was held on 14 November 2018. Kubera faced Václav Hampl and Jan Horník. Kubera advanced to the second round with Václav Hampl, then defeated Hampl by a large margin and replaced Milan Štěch as the Senate President.

On becoming President of the Senate, Kubera said he wanted to improve its reputation among the Czech population by meeting citizens and debating the role of the Senate in the Czech political system. He also said that he wanted to visit all 81 Senate districts.

On 1 January 2019 Kubera gave his first new year speech as the President of the Senate, warning about the loss of personal freedoms and criticising excessive regulations.

In June 2019, Kubera supported a petition for the protection of the individual's right to keep and bear arms. When the Senate discussed a proposal to impeach Czech president Miloš Zeman, Kubera stated that he would only support a narrower proposal, as he believed the wider proposal was not justified. When Zeman said in September 2019 that the Czech Republic should retract its recognition of Kosovan independence, Kubera rejected it, arguing it was just a gesture to please Serbia, and that it was impossible to retract the recognition.

Kubera participated in a reception for delegates from Taiwan, for which he was criticised by the Chinese ambassador to Prague. On 29 September 2019, Kubera then met with the Chinese ambassador and rejected his criticism, stating that the Czech Republic was a sovereign country which the People's Republic of China should respect and not act from a position of power. Kubera announced in October 2019 that he planned to be the first Czech constitutional official to visit Taiwan. His planned visit was criticised by President Zeman, who said it was against the Czech national interest. Zeman said he would end their relationship if Kubera went to Taiwan.

On 1 January 2020 Kubera gave his second New Year speech. He criticised the influence of social networks and the green wave, and expressed fears that freedom of speech was under threat. On 14 January 2020 Kubera met with Czech president Miloš Zeman and Speaker of the Chamber of Deputies Radek Vondráček for lunch, and defended his planned visit to Taiwan.

In January 2020, Kubera was planning to visit Taiwan to enhance trade links between the Czech Republic and Taiwan. A letter from the Chinese Communist Party (CCP) was sent to Kubera's office on 10 January 2020, threatening grave repercussions should the visit go ahead, as the CCP would see it as a breach of the "One-China policy". Kubera died unexpectedly on 20 January before his trip could take place, but the letter, written in Czech, "reveals how explicit Beijing was about the possible consequences if the visit had gone ahead." Kubera's family accused the Chinese Embassy of sending him threatening letters in the time leading up to his death.

== Personal life ==
Kubera was married to Věra Kuberová whom he had known since childhood. They married on 13 September 1968, and had 2 daughters. On 13 September 2018, Kubera and his wife held their second marriage ceremony.

== Death ==
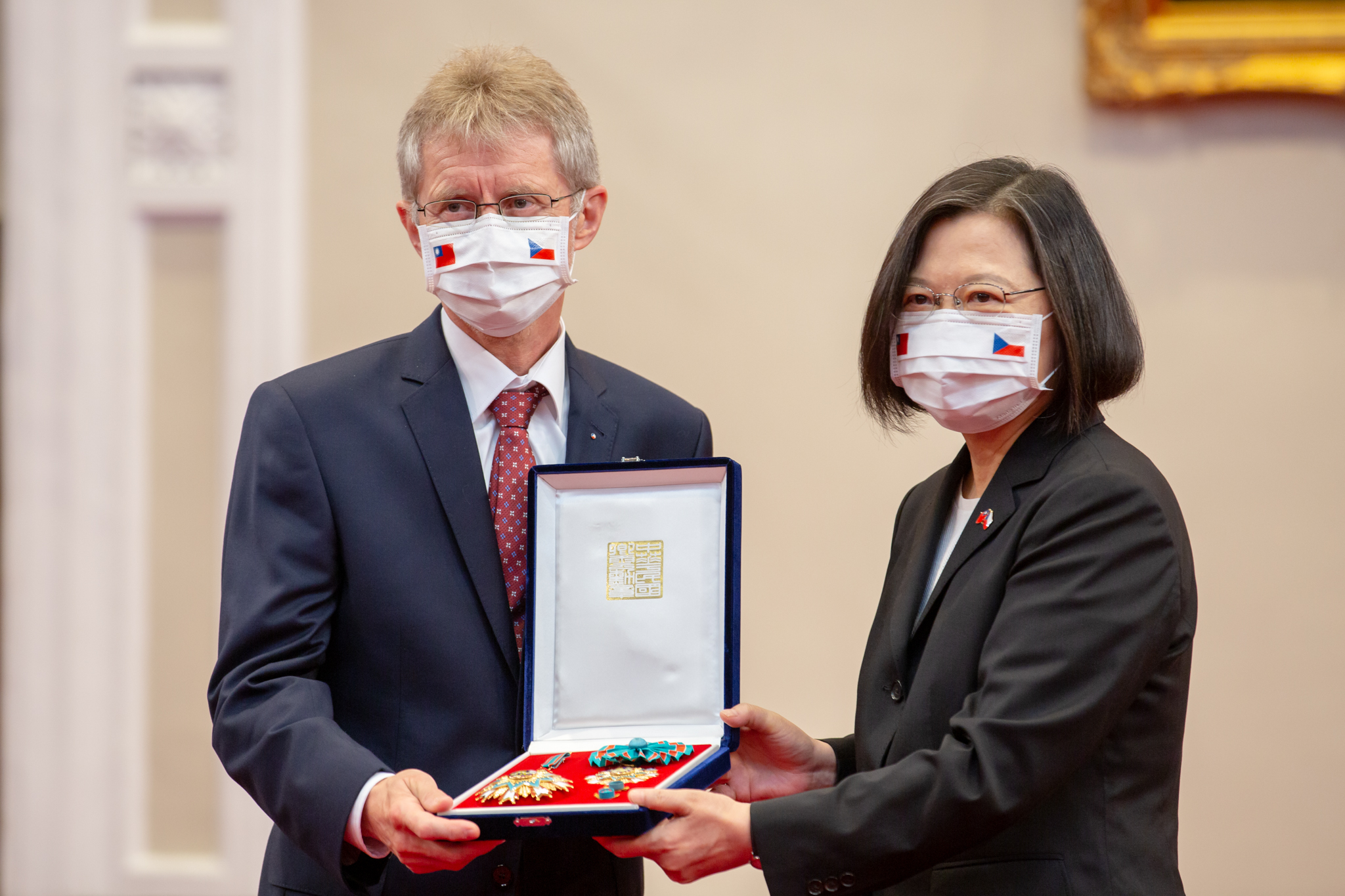
Miloš Vystrčil, in memoriam of Kubera, accepting the Order of Propitious Clouds with Special Grand Cordon during his visit to Taipei, Taiwan in 2020

Kubera died on 20 January 2020 at Ústí nad Labem Hospital. Jiří Růžička became acting President of the Senate. His relatives alleged a threatening message from the Chinese embassy played a part in his sudden death.

His death was a shock for Czech politics. Czech president Miloš Zeman expressed regret for his death, saying he considered him as a friend whom he liked despite their differences. Prime Minister Andrej Babiš expressed shock, stating that he could not believe the news. He said that he liked Kubera, and believed they understood each other. ODS leader Petr Fiala expressed great grief, stating that it was unbelievable, as Kubera had been energetic at the party's Congress. He said that ODS and Czech politics had lost a great personality who would be hard to replace. Former president Václav Klaus said he could not imagine Czech politics without Kubera. Former Czech Prime Minister Mirek Topolánek expressed shock, noting that Kubera had seemed to him an immortal, unstoppable, and never-ending individual. MP Miroslava Němcová said that Kubera was irreplaceable and she would dearly miss him.

Members of the Senate announced on 21 January 2020 that they would ask the Government to declare state mourning and suggested that Kubera's legacy would be honoured by building a bench with an ashtray in the Senate.

Miloš Zeman announced on 27 January 2020 that he would award Kubera with the Order of the White Lion, the highest order of the Czech Republic, and state mourning would be declared for 3 February 2020. However, Kubera's widow Věra Kuberová declined the award, noting the enormous pressure Kubera had received from Zeman and the Chinese embassy in his final days.

Kubera's unrealised plan was put in action by Miloš Vystrčil, his successor as President of the Senate, when he led a 89-member Czech delegation to visit Taiwan on 30 August 2020. Kuberová had originally been scheduled to be part of the delegation, but withdrew for health reasons and instead thanked President of the Republic of China Tsai Ing-wen in a pre-recorded video clip. Kubera was posthumously awarded the Order of Propitious Clouds with Special Grand Cordon by Tsai, and Vystrčil accepted the award on his behalf on 3 September 2020.

== Political views ==
Kubera was considered a conservative politician. Though critical of the European Union, he did not support the Czech Republic leaving the EU. He argued that member states should have more power than the Union, and was also a critic of Angela Merkel's immigration policy.

Kubera was supportive of the market economy and opposed subsidies, which he believed harmed the economy and caused corruption.

Kubera was known for his opposition to anti-smoking legislation. He said that he was not fighting for the rights of smokers but wanted to prevent further limits on freedom. He argued that anti-smoking laws would be eventually followed by regulations that would further restrict people's rights, such as laws pursuing fat people, or eventually a ban on sex on Sunday.

== Electoral history ==
This is a list of electoral performances of Jaroslav Kubera. In election that Kubera ran as a leader of party list the result of the party is listed.

Date	Election	Votes	%	Result
1994	Municipal election	154,179	29.09%	1st place
1998	Municipal election	137,060	35.16%	1st place
1998	Senate election 1st round	9,170	33.22%	1st place
1998	Senate election 2nd round	12,034	47.32%	lost
2000	Senate election 1st round	8,540	30.25%	1st place
2000	Senate election 2nd round	13,169	56.53%	won
2002	Municipal election	392,474	36.94%	1st place
2006	Senate election 1st round	14,252	41.30%	1st place
2006	Senate election 2nd round	11,782	61.17%	won
2006	Municipal election	206,908	47.34%	1st place
2010	Municipal election	200,383	43.17%	1st place
2012	Senate election 1st round	12,582	40.49%	1st place
2012	Senate election 2nd round	13,130	66.84%	won
2014	Municipal election	83,637	26.74%	1st place
2016	Regional election	1,670	10.49%	elected
2018	Senate election 1st round	14,377	41.81%	1st place
2018	Municipal election	94,894	29.32%	1st place
2018	Senate election 2nd round	8,824	55.60%	won
2018	President of the Senate election 1st round	35	43.21%	1st place
2018	President of the Senate election 2nd round	46	57.50%	won

== Film appearance ==
In 2017, Kubera appeared in a cameo role as Edvard Beneš in the historical dramatic film Toman.

== Honours ==
- Order of Propitious Clouds with Special Grand Cordon (Republic of China, 2020) (in-memoriam)
- Order of Tomáš Garrigue Masaryk III. class (2026, in-memoriam)

Political offices
Preceded by Milan Štěch	President of the Czech Senate; 2018–2020	Succeeded by Miloš Vystrčil
