= Jiří Drahoš =

Czech physical chemist and politician

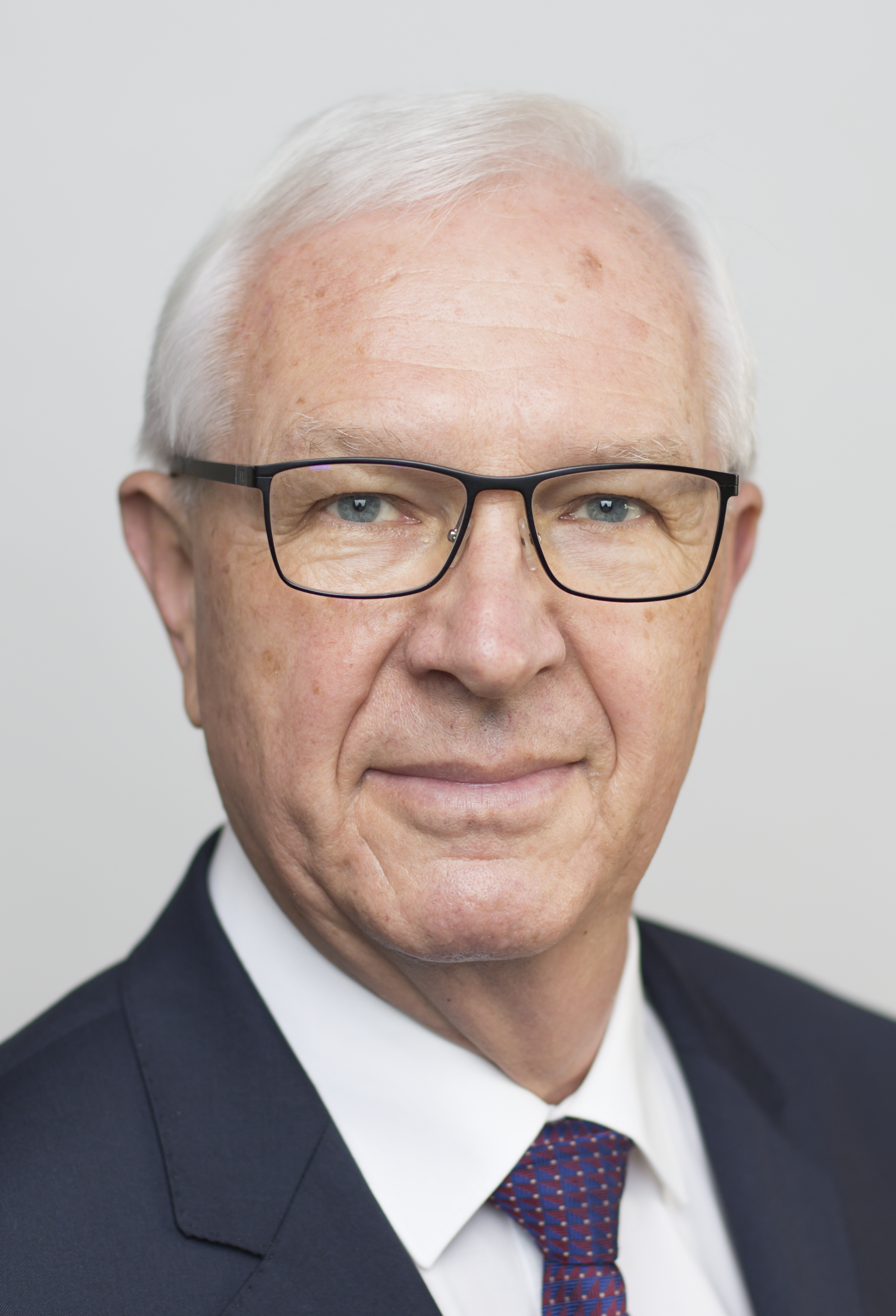

Senator from Prague 4
- Incumbent
- Assumed office 6 October 2018
- Preceded by: Eva Syková

President of the Czech Academy of Sciences
- In office 25 March 2009 – 24 March 2017
- Preceded by: Václav Pačes
- Succeeded by: Eva Zažímalová

Personal details
- Born: 20 February 1949 (age 77) Český Těšín, Czechoslovakia (now Czech Republic)
- Party: Independent
- Other political affiliations: Member of STAN Senate Club (2018–present)
- Spouse: Eva Drahošová
- Children: 2 daughters
- Education: University of Chemistry and Technology, Prague; Slovak University of Technology, Bratislava
- Awards: Medal of Merit (2012)
- Website: Official website

Jiří Drahoš (born 20 February 1949; Czech pronunciation: [ˈjɪr̝iː ˈdraɦoʃ]) is a Czech physical chemist and politician who has been the Senator of Prague 4 since October 2018. Previously, Drahoš served as President of the Czech Academy of Sciences from 2009 to 2017, and was a candidate in the 2018 Czech presidential election.

Born in Český Těšín and raised in nearby Jablunkov, Drahoš studied physical chemistry at the University of Chemistry and Technology in Prague, and joined the Institute of Chemical Process Fundamentals of the Czechoslovak Academy of Sciences in 1973, which he later led from 1995 to 2003. In 2009, he was elected President of the Czech Academy of Sciences. His term as head of the academy ended on 24 March 2017.

In March 2017, Drahoš announced his candidacy for President of the Czech Republic in the 2018 election. He ran on a moderate centrist platform, and is generally pro-European and supportive of NATO and Atlanticism. Drahoš lost the second round of the presidential election to his opponent President Miloš Zeman with 48.6% of the vote, but vowed to remain in public life. In October 2018, he stood for the Czech Senate in the Prague 4 district, winning the election outright in the first round with 52.65% of the vote.

He is a member of the European Academy of Sciences and Arts.

== Early life and career ==
Jiří Drahoš was born on 20 February 1949 in Český Těšín to a Czech father originally from Skuteč in Vysočina, and a Polish mother from Jablunkov. He spent most of his childhood in Jablunkov, where his mother Anna lived and worked as a nurse. His father, also named Jiří, was a teacher in a local Czech school.

Drahoš studied at the University of Chemistry and Technology in Prague and qualified as a scientist in 1972. He joined the Institute of Chemical Process Fundamentals at the Czech Academy of Sciences, and was later head of the institute from 1996 to 2003. On 13 March 2009, Drahoš was elected President of the Czech Academy of Sciences, defeating Eva Syková. During his tenure, he successfully opposed 50% budget cuts to the Academy proposed by the governments of Prime Ministers Mirek Topolánek and Jan Fischer as a consequence of the 2008 financial crisis. Drahoš later called it an "attempt to destroy my motherly institution". In 2012, President Václav Klaus awarded him the Medal of Merit in the field of science. His second term as head of the academy ended on 24 March 2017. He is co-author of 14 patents.

== Political career ==
=== 2018 presidential campaign ===
On 28 March 2017, Drahoš announced his intention to stand in the 2018 presidential election. On 24 April 2017, he started gathering the signatures required to be registered as a candidate. In July 2017, after meeting with Drahoš, the leaders of Populars and Mayors, Pavel Bělobrádek and Petr Gazdík, announced that they would ask their respective parties' members to nominate and endorse Drahoš's candidacy. Mayors and Independents endorsed Drahoš on 25 July 2017 while the Christian and Democratic Union – Czechoslovak People's Party (KDU–ČSL) endorsed him on 14 November 2017. Young Social Democrats also endorsed Drahoš on 9 December 2017. Polls in late 2017 showed Drahoš as the second strongest candidate behind Zeman.

Drahoš received campaign donations from several influential businessmen, including Dalibor Dědek, Jiří Grygar and Luděk Sekyra. Drahoš started gathering signatures for his nomination in May 2017. On 19 August 2017, Drahoš announced he had gathered 78,000 signatures. He submitted his nomination on 3 November 2017 with 142,000 signatures.

On 4 November 2017 on Facebook, Drahoš criticized Mirek Topolánek, who had announced his candidacy that day, describing Topolánek as similar to Miloš Zeman and calling his candidacy a bad joke. The two candidates met during a presidential debate at Charles University; Drahoš reflected that the status he posted was "Topolánek-like", to which Topolánek replied that it was written either by "a woman or PR mage".

Drahoš received media attention when he expressed his fear that the election could be influenced by Russia. He met outgoing Prime Minister Bohuslav Sobotka to discuss the matter and stated he would also meet the new Prime Minister Andrej Babiš. The incumbent president Miloš Zeman criticized Drahoš and compared his actions to Hillary Clinton's when she lost to Donald Trump.

Drahoš received criticism when he published a status on social media about Václav Klaus' amnesty, when it was revealed that he had copied a similar status by his fellow presidential candidate Michal Horáček. Drahoš apologised and attributed the mistake to an external member of staff.

The first round was held on 12 and 13 January 2018. Drahoš received 1,369,601 (26.6%) votes, and advanced to the second round against the incumbent president Miloš Zeman. In the second round, held on 26–27 January 2018, Drahoš received 48.63% of the vote and thus lost to Zeman. Drahoš conceded defeat to Zeman, telling a crowd of his supporters that "I would like to congratulate election winner Miloš Zeman".

=== Senate ===
Following the 2018 presidential election, Drahoš vowed to remain in public life, and in March 2018 announced his bid for the Prague 4 Senate seat in the 2018 election, nominated by Mayors and Independents and supported by TOP 09, KDU–ČSL and the Green Party. He won the election outright in the first round, with 52.65% of the vote.

At the beginning of November 2022, Drahoš was elected 1st Deputy President of the Czech Senate replacing Jiří Růžička, having received 67 out of 80 votes in a secret ballot.

In the 2024 Czech Senate elections, he defended his seat as a non-party member of STAN in Senate District No.20 - Prague 4, with the support of STAN, Pirates, ODS, KDU-ČSL and TOP 09. He won the first round of the election, receiving 48.21% of the vote. On 30 October 2024, he was re-elected as the 1st Deputy President of the Senate, with 61 votes from the 79 senators present.

== Political views ==
Drahoš considers himself a centrist politician. As a candidate, Jiří Drahoš has presented himself as someone who can unite society, and as a respectable person who would act according to the constitution. Drahoš emphasises the importance of Czech science and education and has called for solidarity with those "who cannot take care of themselves". He has called for a "responsible approach" to the landscape and environment and has described human reason, creativity and ingeniousness as the only "renewable resource" of the wealth of the Czech Republic.

Drahoš wants the Czech Republic to play an active role in discussions over the future of the European Union, and wants the country to be a part of the Western world. He supports European integration but has said that he believes that the European Union should not impose unnecessary regulations on member states. He also said that he would not rush into Czech adoption of the Euro. Drahoš opposes a referendum about Czech membership of the European Union, and said that important geopolitical questions should not be decided by referendum. He supports the Czech Republic's membership of NATO.

In August 2015, Drahoš signed a petition named "scientists against fear and apathy" in opposition to both anti-Islamic radicalism and anti-immigrant populism.

Drahoš suggested that the Catalan independence referendum was "not legal", supporting the position of the Spanish government.

In 2017, Drahoš said he supports the sanctions against Russia imposed by the United States and the EU. However he also said that having good relations with Russia is in the interest of the Czech Republic and European Union. Drahoš supports trade and economic relations with China, arguing that "China is a superpower" and "many countries are doing business with China."

In 2017, Drahoš rejected the European Union's proposal of compulsory migrant quotas, saying, "there is no successful model of Muslim integration in Europe". Drahoš also said that "Europe can't feed 100 million Africans, it is necessary to help them at home."

Drahoš described the pre-war German minority in Czechoslovakia as "Adolf Hitler's fifth column", and said that he agreed with the post-war expulsion of Germans from Czechoslovakia.

Drahoš has described himself as a sympathizer with Israel.
