= Jiří Růžička (politician) =

Czech politician

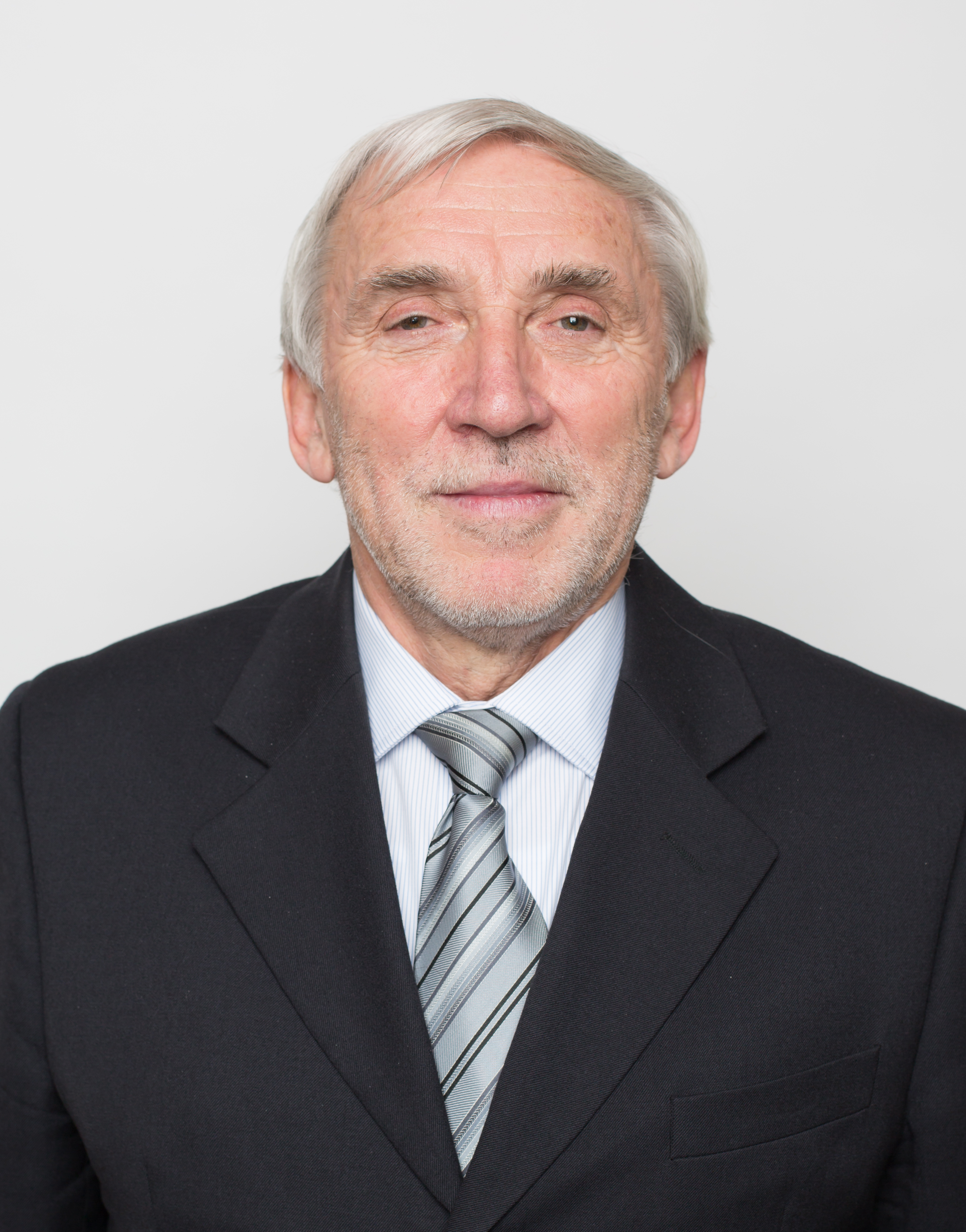
- Official portrait, 2016

President of the Czech Senate
- Acting; 20 January 2020 – 19 February 2020
- Vice President: Himself
- Preceded by: Jaroslav Kubera
- Succeeded by: Miloš Vystrčil

First Vice President of the Czech Senate
- In office 14 November 2018 – 15 October 2022
- President: Jaroslav Kubera; Himself (acting); Miloš Vystrčil
- Preceded by: Miluše Horská
- Succeeded by: Jiří Drahoš

Senator of the Czech Republic
- Incumbent
- Assumed office 15 October 2016
- Preceded by: Petr Bratský
- Constituency: Prague 6

Personal details
- Born: 12 May 1948 Prague, Czechoslovakia (now Czech Republic)
- Party: TOP 09
- Spouse: Dana Růžičková
- Education: Charles University
- Website: jiri-ruzicka.cz

Jiří Růžička (born 12 May 1948) is a Czech pedagogue and politician who served as the acting President of the Senate of the Czech Republic following the death of Jaroslav Kubera.
