= Miloš Vystrčil =

President of the Senate of the Czech Republic since 2020

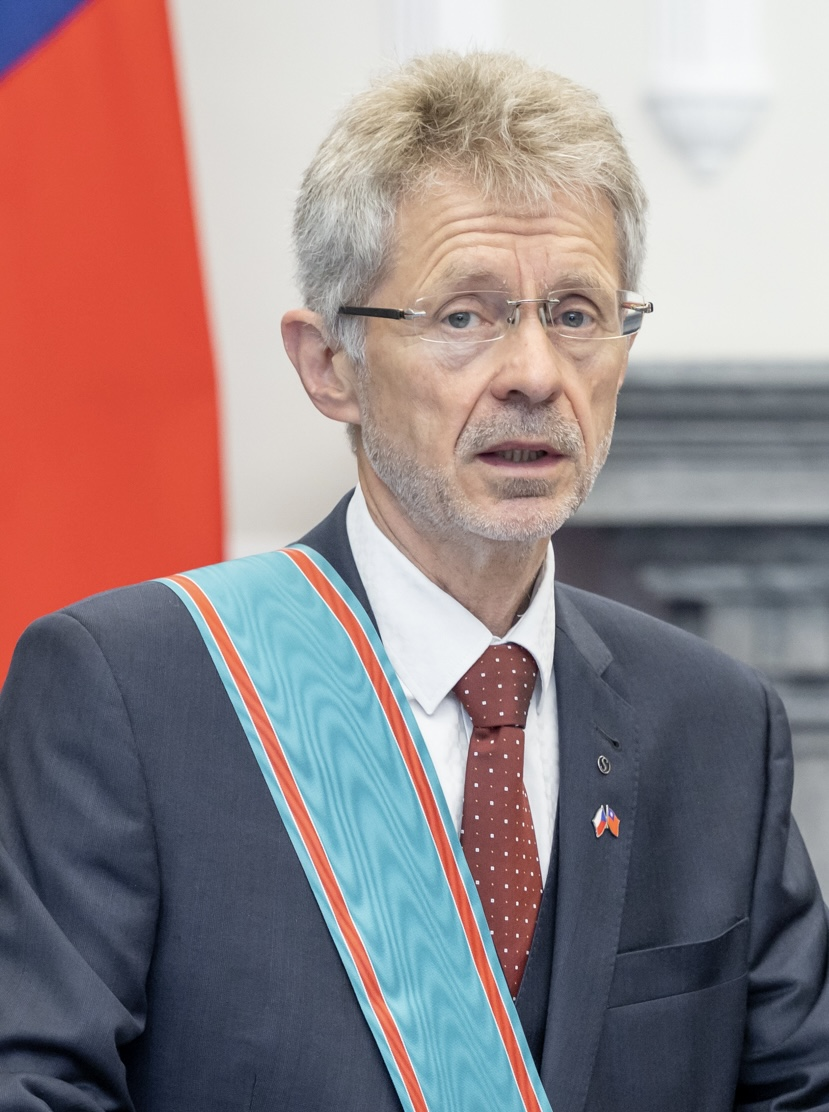
- Vystrčil in 2026

8th President of the Czech Senate
- Incumbent
- Assumed office 19 February 2020
- Vice President: Jiří Růžička; Jiří Drahoš
- Preceded by: Jiří Růžička (acting)

2nd Governor of Vysočina
- In office 7 December 2004 – 14 November 2008
- Preceded by: František Dohnal
- Succeeded by: Jiří Běhounek
Parliamentary offices
Leader of the Civic Democratic Party in the Czech Senate
In office 8 November 2016 – 19 February 2020
Leader	Petr Fiala
Preceded by	Jaroslav Kubera
Succeeded by	Martin Červíček

Member of the Czech Senate
- Incumbent
- Assumed office 23 October 2010
- Preceded by: Václav Jehlička
- Constituency: Jihlava

Personal details
- Born: 8 October 1960 (age 65) Dačice, Czechoslovakia
- Party: ODS
- Education: Masaryk University
- Website: https://www.vystrcil.cz/

Miloš Vystrčil (Czech pronunciation: [ˈmɪloʃ ˈvɪstr̩tʃɪl], born 10 August 1960) is a Czech politician serving as the President of the Senate since 2020 and Senator for Jihlava since 2010. Vystrčil previously served as Mayor of Telč and governor of Vysočina Region.

== Biography ==
He was born in Dačice in 1960. He studied math and physics at Masaryk University and became a teacher. Vystrčil joined the Civic Democratic Party (ODS) in 1991. He became part of Telč town assembly in 1994. He was elected Mayor of Telč in 1998 and remained in the position until 2001.

Vystrčil participated in 2000 regional election and became member of regional assembly in Vysočina. He was regional Governor in 2004–2008. In 2010 he ran in Senate election for Seat in Jihlava. He defeated Social Democrat Václav Stehlík and became Senator. In 2016 Vystrčil was reelected.

Following the death of Jaroslav Kubera, Vystrčil was nominated for the position of President of the Senate in 2020 election. Besides the Civic Democratic Party his candidacy was endorsed by KDU-ČSL, Czech Social Democratic Party and ANO 2011. Vystrčil won the election and became the new Senate President on 19 February 2020. After the Senate's elections (first round held on 2–3 October 2020, second round held on 9–10 October 2020) he was re-elected in a secret vote on 11 November 2020 by 73 from 77 votes.

=== August–September 2020 visit to Taiwan ===
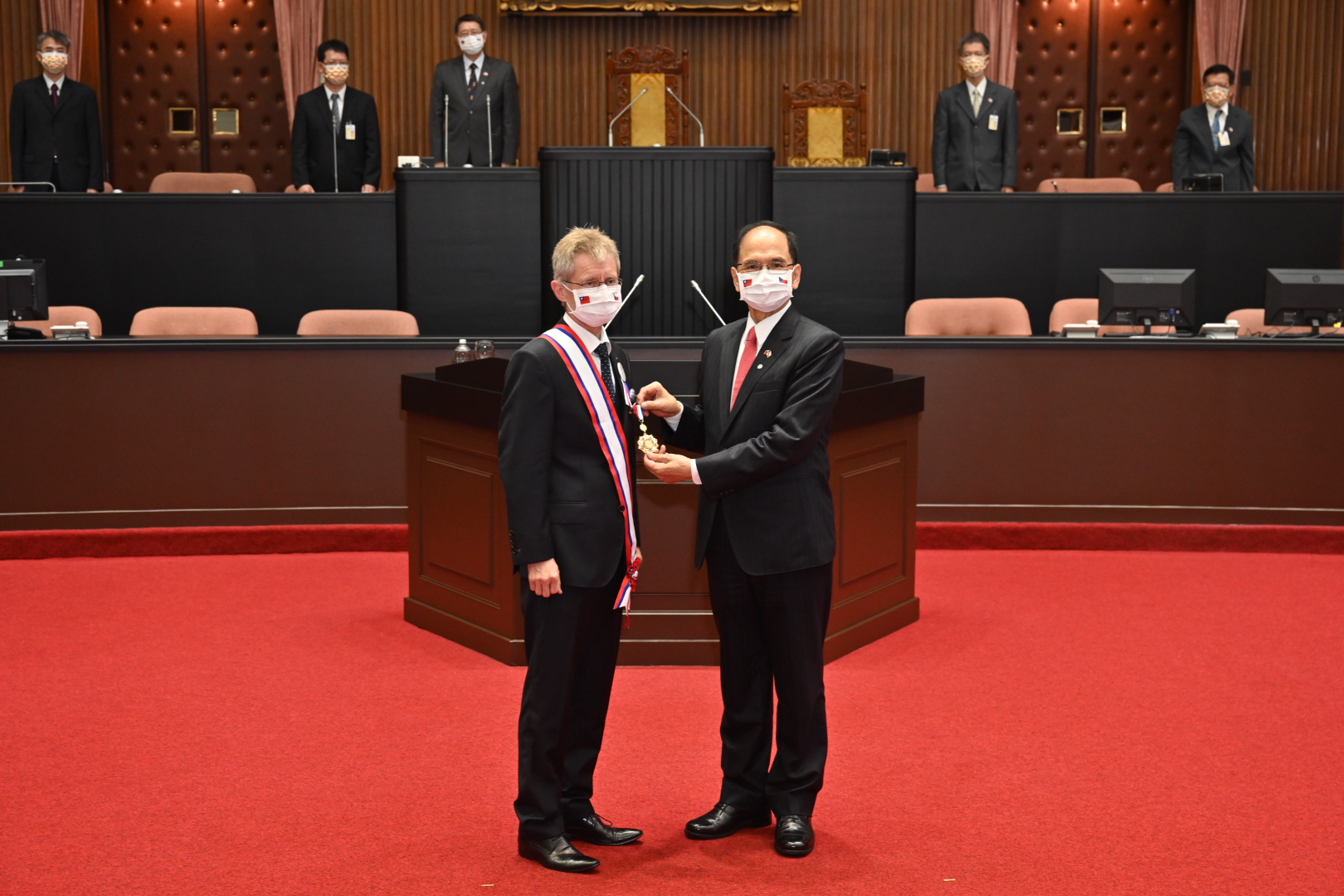
President of the Legislative Yuan Yu Shyi-kun awards Vystrčil a First Class Diplomatic Medal

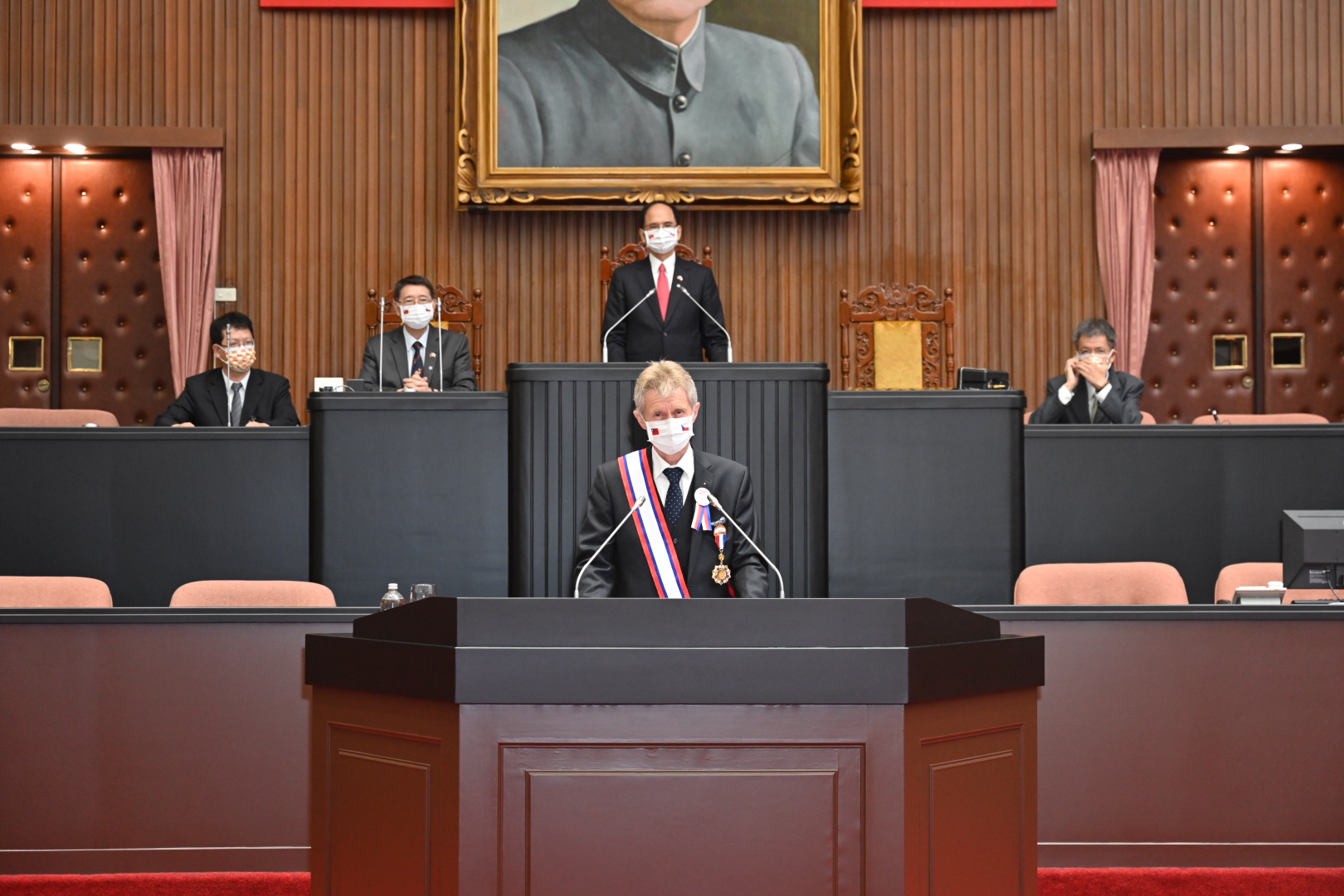
Miloš delivers a speech in the Taiwanese parliament.

Vystrčil announced on 9 June 2020 that he would make a trip with a business delegation to Taiwan, as his predecessor Kubera had planned before his death. This step was against a recommendation by the government of the Czech Republic, which adheres to a One China policy and has only unofficial ties with Taiwan, and met with strong condemnation and unspecified threats by the Chinese government. A delegation led by Vystrčil arrived in Taipei on 30 August 2020. Chinese Foreign Minister Wang Yi reacted by issuing a sharply worded statement, calling the visit a "provocation". In response, the Czech Foreign Minister summoned the Chinese envoy to Prague, and also China summoned the Czech envoy.

In Taiwan, Vystrčil met the President of Taiwan Tsai Ing-wen, and delivered a speech in the parliament of Taiwan. In his address, Vystrčil declared "I am a Taiwanese" in Mandarin, alluding to the phrase Ich bin ein Berliner that John F. Kennedy had used in one of his most famous speeches. The move led Chinese Foreign Minister Wang Yi to state that Vystrčil's trip had "crossed a red line". In response, German Foreign Minister Heiko Maas, who had been hosting Wang for an official visit at the time when Wang made his statements, said that "Europeans operate in foreign and security policy very closely with one another", and indirectly referred to Wang's statements as "threats" which were not in line with the expectations of the European Union.

Political offices
Preceded by František Dohnal	Governor of Vysočina Region; 2004–2008	Succeeded by Jiří Běhounek
Preceded by Jiří Růžička; Acting	President of the Czech Senate; 2020–present	Incumbent
