= 2019 Mayors and Independents leadership election =

- 13 April 2019
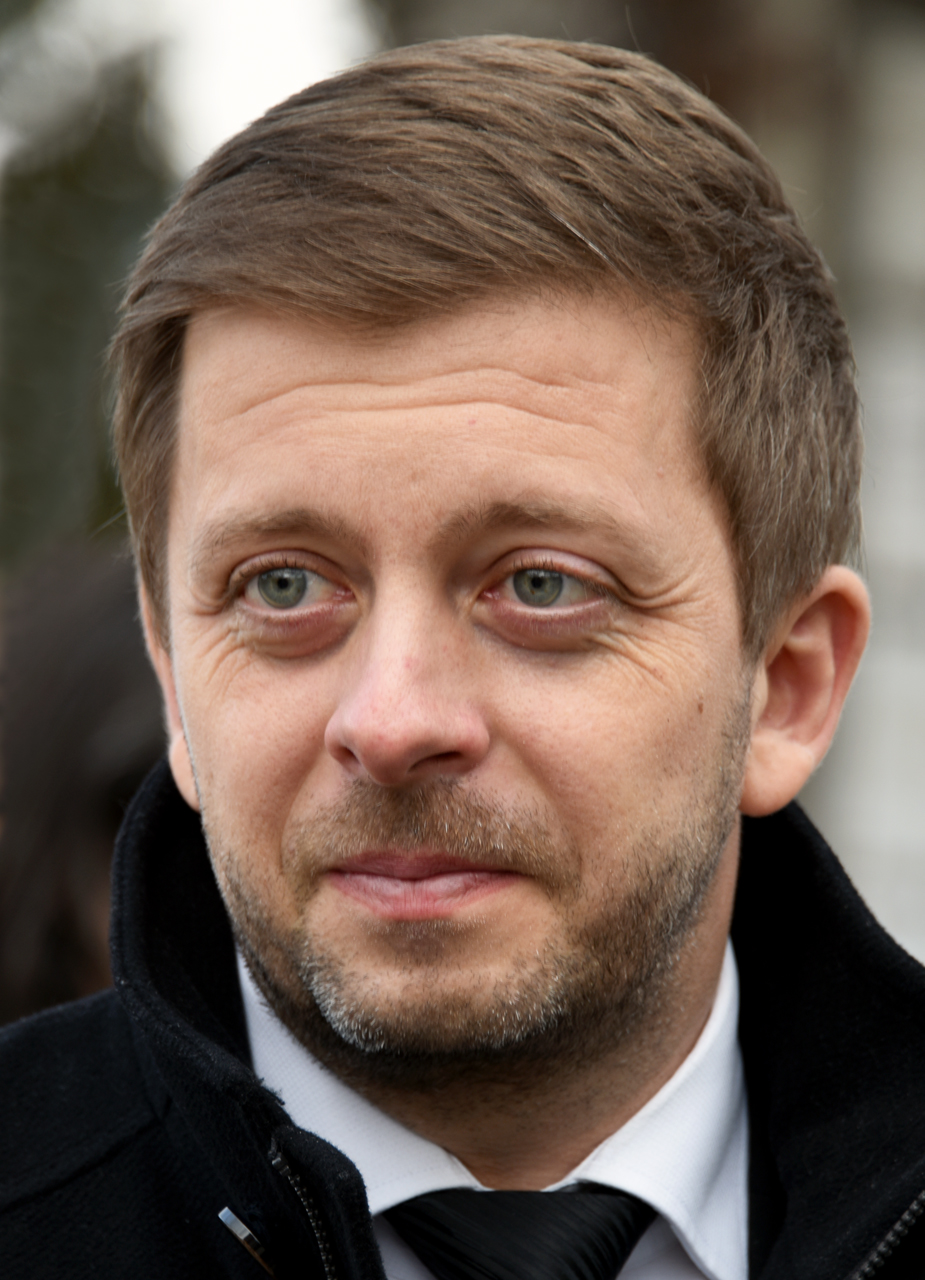
Candidate	Vít Rakušan
Electoral vote	139
Percentage	93.9%
leader of STAN before election
Petr Gazdík
Elected leader of STAN
Vít Rakušan

A leadership election for the Mayors and Independents (STAN) in 2019 was held on 13 April 2019. The incumbent leader Petr Gazdík decided to not run for another term and was replaced by Vít Rakušan.

== Background ==
Gazdík led the party since 2009. He was last elected in 2017. He decided to not run for another term stating that he doesn't want STAN to be a one-man party and that he wants to focus on education. Vít Rakušan was viewed as likeliest successor. Rakušan announced candidacy on 18 December 2018.

== Voting ==
Election was held on 13 April 2019. Rakušan was the only candidate. He received 139 of 148 votes and thus won the election.
