= 2025 Mayors and Independents leadership election =

- 17 May 2025
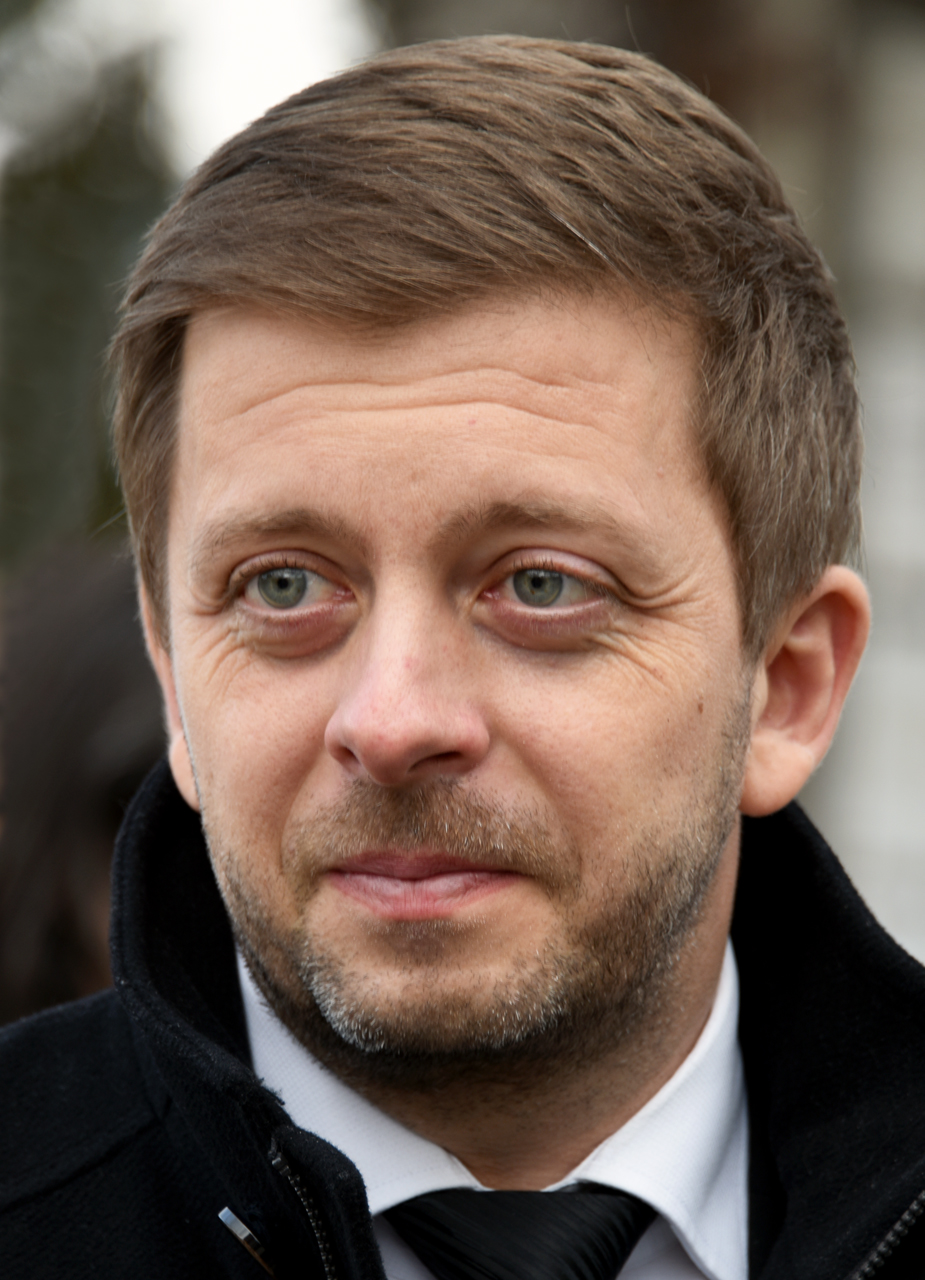
Candidate	Vít Rakušan
Electoral vote	282
Percentage	98.6%
leader of STAN before election
Vít Rakušan
Elected leader of STAN
Vít Rakušan

A leadership election for the Mayors and Independents (STAN) in 2025 was held on 17 May 2025. The incumbent leader Vít Rakušan was elected for another term.

== Background ==
Rakušan led the party since 2019. Since the previous election the party has doubled its electoral preferences, and most of the current leadership wants to be reelected.

== Election ==
Voting was held on 17 May 2025. Rakušan was the only candidate. He received 282 of 286 votes and thus was reelected.
