= 2021 Mayors and Independents leadership election =

- 31 August 2021
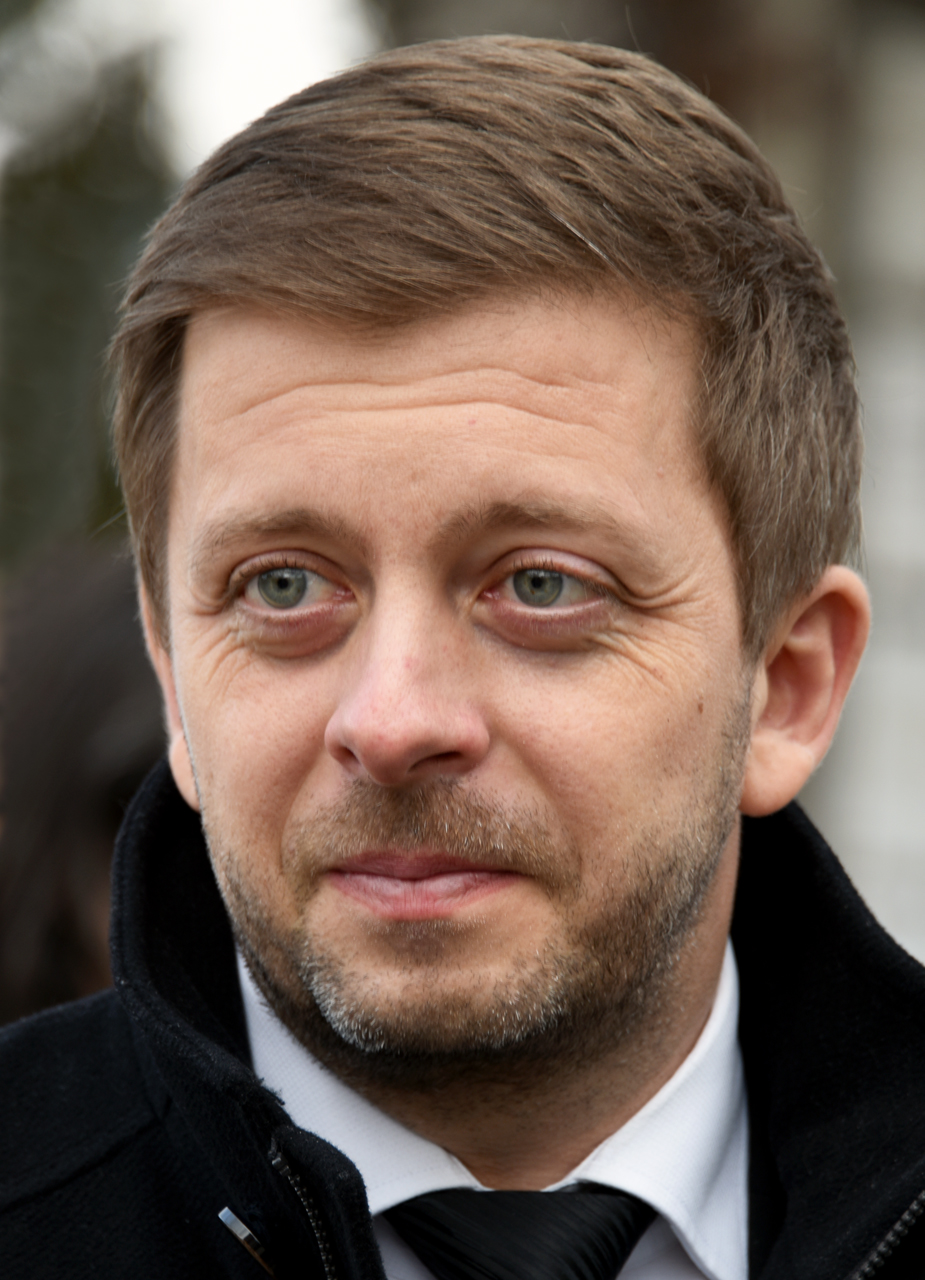
Candidate	Vít Rakušan
Electoral vote	179
Percentage	96%
leader of STAN before election
Vít Rakušan
Elected leader of STAN
Vít Rakušan

A leadership election for the Mayors and Independents (STAN) in 2021 was held on 31 August 2021. The incumbent leader Vít Rakušan was the only candidate and received 96% of votes.

== Election ==
Rakušan led the party since 2019. Under his leadership party made significant gains in 2020 Czech regional elections and 2020 Czech Senate election. Party formed electoral alliance with Czech Pirate Party for 2021 Czech legislative election. Election was originally set for 26 June 2021but it was delayed as a reaction to 2021 South Moravia tornado. New date was set for 31 August 2021 which was one month prior 2021 Czech legislative election.

Election was held on 31 August 2021. Rakušan was the only candidate. During his candidacy speech he defended alliance with Pirate Party and stated that the alliance aims to return future to the Czech Republic. He received 179 of 187 votes which is 95.7%.
