= Pirates and Mayors =

Czech political alliance

Pirates and Mayors Piráti a Starostové
- Abbreviation: PirStan
- Leader: Ivan Bartoš (Piráti)
- Deputy Leader: Vít Rakušan (STAN)
- Founded: 14 December 2020; 5 years ago
- Dissolved: 6 November 2021; 4 years ago
- Ideology: Liberalism (Czech); Progressivism; Decentralisation; Environmentalism; Direct democracy; Pro-Europeanism
- Political position: Centre
- European Parliament group: Greens–European Free Alliance (3 MEPs); European People's Party Group (1 MEP)
- Colours: Black; Yellow; Green

Website
- www.piratiastarostove.cz (Archived)

Pirates and Mayors (Czech: Piráti a Starostové, PirStan) was a liberal progressive centrist political alliance in the Czech Republic, formed for the 2021 legislative election, consisting of the Czech Pirate Party (Piráti) and Mayors and Independents (STAN). Following the 2021 Czech election it governed the Czech Republic in a coalition with the SPOLU alliance.

== History ==
Following the 2020 regional elections, opposition parties began negotiations about potential electoral alliances. Speculation began about a liberal bloc composed of the Pirate Party and Mayors and Independents, with Ivan Bartoš as the leader.

The leadership of Mayors and Independents agreed to start negotiations on 8 October 2020. The Pirates were required to ratify any alliance in a members' referendum. A poll on 20 October 2020 indicated that 51% of Pirate Party members were opposed to the alliance while 43% supported it. The referendum to start negotiations for an alliance was originally scheduled for 13 to 16 November 2020, but was rescheduled for 20 to 23 November 2020. Among Pirate Party members, 695 out of 858 voted in favor of negotiations, with a turnout of 80%. Ivan Bartoš was nominated as the Pirate Party's election leader on 25 November 2020, and was confirmed on 2 December 2020. The Pirates also offered the Green Party the possibility to join its electoral list. Ivan Bartoš was confirmed as the alliance's electoral leader on 14 December 2020. Pirate Party members voted to approve the alliance on 13 January 2021.

The alliance participated in the 2021 legislative election, finishing third with 15.6% of the votes and 37 seats, which was considered a disappointment. Due to preference voting, Mayors and Independents won 33 seats and the Czech Pirate Party won just 4 seats. Some media reports said that the atmosphere between STAN and Pirates had become more tense following the election, leading to speculation about the potential dissolution of the alliance, with the Pirates remaining in opposition. However, in early November, Pirates and Mayors signed a coalition agreement to form a government with SPOLU. Following coalition negotiations with SPOLU, the alliance was assigned seven ministries of the government, out of which four are for Mayors and Independents and three for Pirates.

In November, Rakušan stated that STAN will not enter the next election on a joint list with the Pirates.

== Member parties ==
Name	Ideology	Position	Leader	MPs before election	MPs after election	Senators	MEPs	Regional councillors
Czech Pirate Party	Pirate politics	Centre to centre-left	Ivan Bartoš	22 / 200	4 / 200	2 / 81	3 / 21	99 / 675
Mayors and Independents	Localism	Centre to centre-right	Vít Rakušan	6 / 200	33 / 200	19 / 81	1 / 21	91 / 675

== Regional leaders in the 2021 election ==
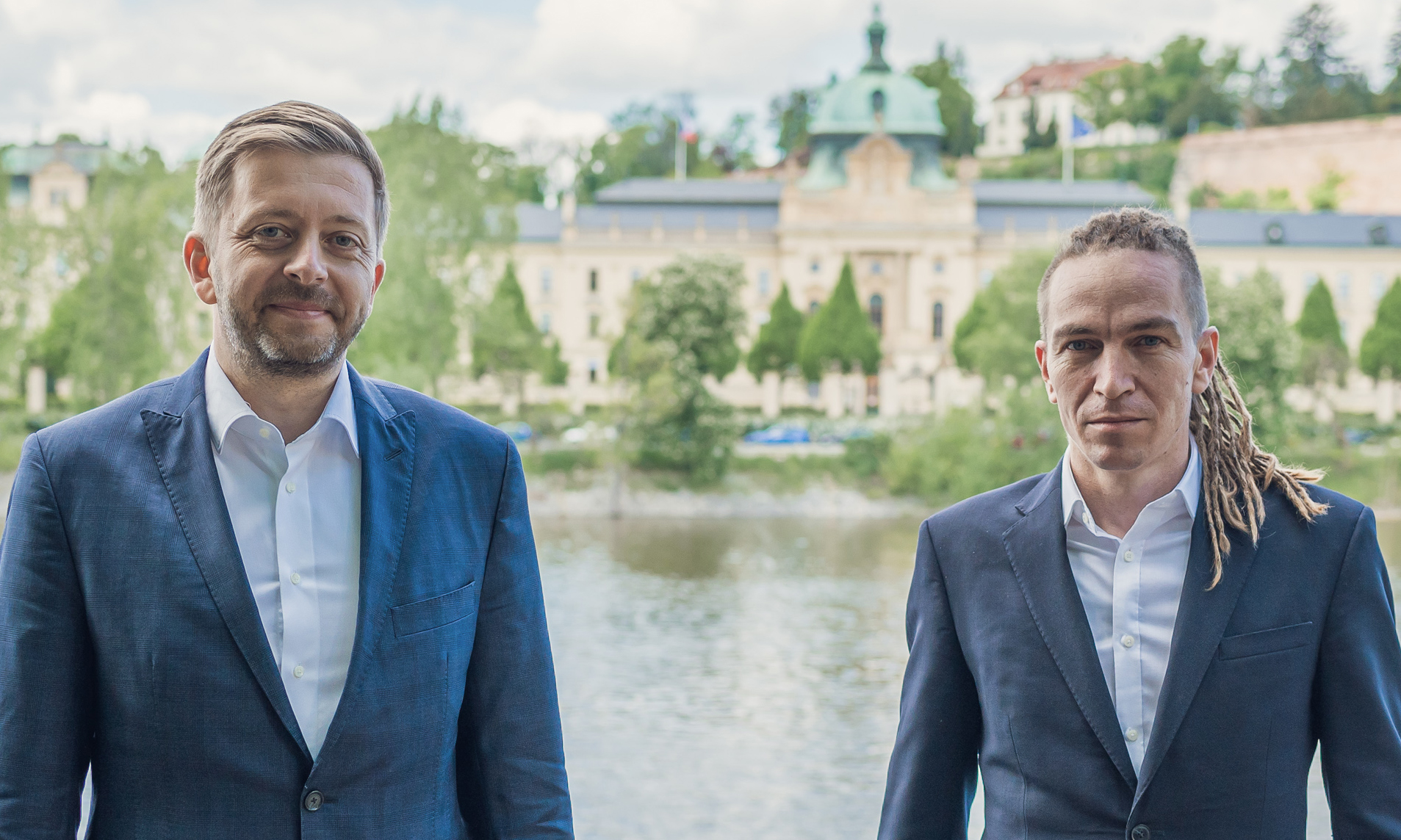
Vice-chairman Vít Rakušan (left) and chairman Ivan Bartoš (right)

Region	Leader		2017 result combined		2021 result	
Region	Name	Party	Votes	Seats	Votes	Seats
Prague	Olga Richterová	Piráti	22.6%	6 / 24	22.64%	6 / 23
Central Bohemian	Vít Rakušan	STAN	20.2%	5 / 26	19.46%	6 / 26
South Bohemian	Lukáš Kolářík	Piráti	15.1%	1 / 13	13.50%	2 / 13
Plzeň	Josef Bernard	STAN	14.9%	1 / 11	13.88%	2 / 11
Karlovy Vary	Petr Třešňák	Piráti	15.3%	1 / 5	14.23%	1 / 5
Ústí nad Labem	Ivan Bartoš	Piráti	11.9%	1 / 13	13.99%	2 / 14
Liberec	Jan Farský	STAN	24.2%	2 / 8	21.37%	2 / 8
Hradec Králové	Martin Jiránek	Piráti	15.8%	1 / 11	15.13%	2 / 11
Pardubice	Mikuláš Ferjenčík	Piráti	15.5%	1 / 10	14.09%	2 / 10
Vysočina	Blanka Lednická	Piráti	14.2%	1 / 10	13.51%	1 / 10
South Moravian	Radek Holomčík	Piráti	12.7%	3 / 23	14.19%	4 / 23
Olomouc	Tomáš Müller	STAN	12.9%	1 / 12	12.35%	2 / 12
Zlín	František Elfmark	Piráti	14.3%	2 / 12	13.44%	2 / 12
Moravian-Silesian	Lukáš Černohorský	Piráti	11.3%	2 / 22	11.13%	3 / 22

== Election results ==
Year	Leader	Vote	Vote %	Seats	+/-	Place	Position
2021	Ivan Bartoš	839,776	15.62	37 / 200	▲9	3rd	Government
