= Dana Drábová =

Czech physicist and local politician (1961–2025)

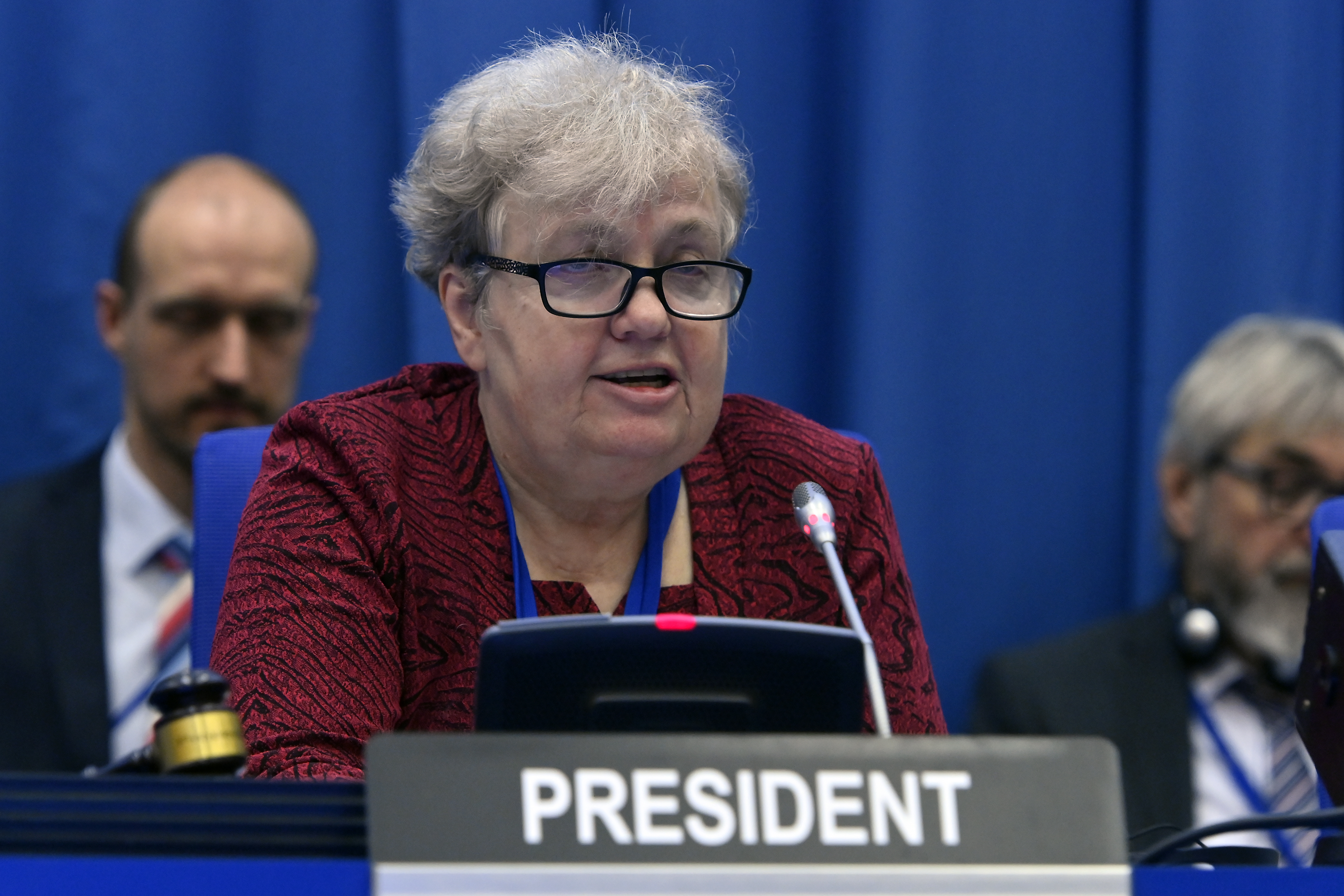
- Drábová as president of the CNS in 2023
- Born: 3 June 1961; Prague, Czechoslovakia
- Died: 6 October 2025 (aged 64)
- Other name: The Nuclear Lady
- Education: FNSPE CTU
- Occupations: Physicist, politician
- Partner: Markéta Pávová (until 2025)

Dana Drábová (3 June 1961 – 6 October 2025) was a Czech physicist and politician. She was the chair of the State Office for Nuclear Safety from 1999 to 2025, and served as President of the 2023 meetings of the parties to the Convention on Nuclear Safety.

== Life and career ==
Drábová was born in Prague on 3 June 1961. She went to school in Říčany, before studying at the Czech Technical University in Prague. She studied at their Faculty of Nuclear and Physical Engineering, specialising in dosimetry and the application of radiation. She gained the "Ing." degree after she completed her thesis on the Measurement of neutrons and determining the dose from neutrons using microdosimetry.

She was the chairwoman of the State Office for Nuclear Safety.

In 2013 Drábová (popularly known as "The Atomic Crone", a nickname she sometimes jokingly used herself) was awarded an honorary degree from the Technical University of Liberec for her work in popularizing science. She has appeared on television programmes and she was an advocate for technical science to high schools and university students. Drábová has given lectures at the Liberec university.

The businessman Michal Horáček stood to be President of the Czech Republic. He announced his advisers in February 2017, including former Slovak presidential candidate Magdaléna Vášáryová, Dana Drábová, and surgeon Pavel Pafko.

In 2018 she was on the board of the think tank Institute of Modern Politics iSTAR.

In 2023 she announced that the six Czech nuclear reactor units would be looking for an alternative supplier for its nuclear fuel.

She was President of the 8th and 9th joint meetings of the parties to the Convention on Nuclear Safety in March 2023.

Drábová died after a serious illness on 6 October 2025, at the age of 64.

== Honours ==
- Order of the White Lion, III Class (2025)
- Order of the Rising Sun, 2nd Class, Gold and Silver Star (2024)
- Cross of Merit of the Minister of Defence of the Czech Republic, 3rd Class (2022)
- Medal of Merit, 1st Grade (2014)
