= Jan Farský =

Czech politician

Jan Farský MP
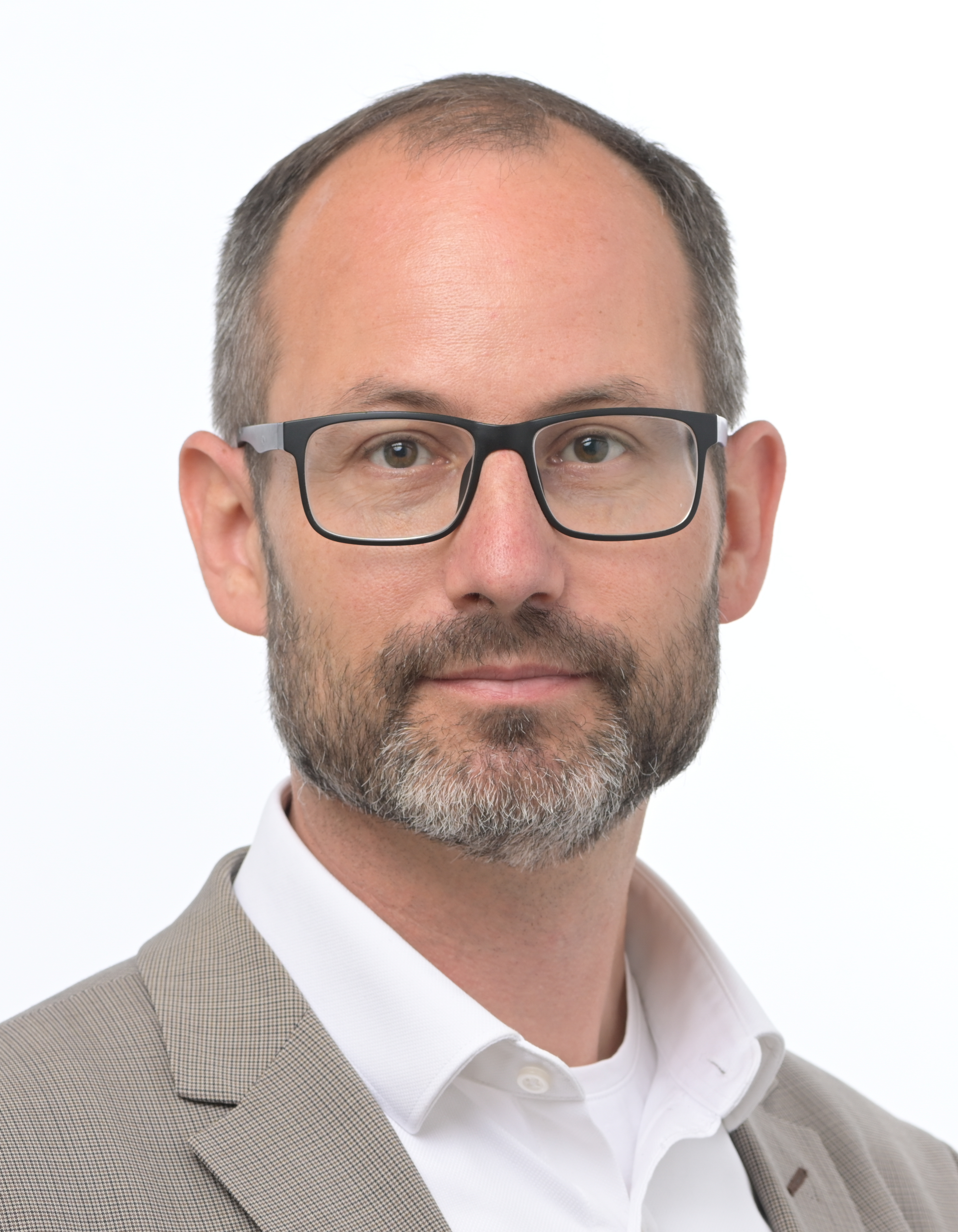

Member of the Chamber of Deputies
- In office 29 May 2010 – 15 February 2022

1st Vice-Chair of STAN
- Incumbent
- Assumed office 13 April 2019
- Preceded by: Vít Rakušan

Chair of STAN parliamentary group
- Incumbent
- Assumed office 23 October 2017
- Preceded by: Position established

Leader of Mayors for the Liberec Region
- In office 3 June 2008 – 14 November 2009
- Preceded by: Position established
- Succeeded by: Martin Půta

Vice-Chair of Mayors for the Liberec Region
- In office 14 November 2009 – 2017

Mayor of Semily
- In office 2 November 2006 – 7 November 2014
- Preceded by: František Mojžíš
- Succeeded by: Věra Blažková

Personal details
- Born: 11 July 1979 (age 47) Turnov, Czechoslovakia (now Czech Republic)
- Children: 4
- Education: Masaryk University

Jan Farský (born 11 July 1979) is a Czech politician. He has been a Member of the European Parliament since June 2024, representing the Mayors and Independents (STAN). He was previously a member of the Chamber of Deputies (MP) from May 2010 to February 2022, and has been vice-chair of STAN since April 2019. He was previously a representative in the Liberec Regional Assembly from 2008 to 2010 and again from 2016 to 2018, and the Mayor of Semily from 2006 to 2014.

== Early life and education ==
Farský was born in Turnov in 1979. He graduated from the Faculty of Law at Masaryk University in Brno with a master's degree in 2002.

Farský began his professional career as a municipal lawyer in Semily. After a year he transferred to a private law office to work as a trainee solicitor, before becoming an adviser to Deputy Prime Minister for Economic Policy Martin Jahn. He subsequently started working for Škoda Auto, as an adviser in the department for relations with public institutions.

== Political career ==
=== Municipal politics ===
Farský entered politics in 2002, when he was elected onto the municipal council in Semily. Four years later he became the Mayor of Semily as the leader of a local political movement, Volba pro Semily (lit. 'Choice for Semily'), remaining in this office for eight years. Before the 2014 Czech municipal elections, Farský announced that he would not seek reelection as mayor again, and in March 2015 he again became a municipal councillor in the town.

Farský ran as a member of STAN in the 2018 municipal elections, but on the Volba pro Semily candidate list for the municipal council. He received the seventh largest number of preference votes of the 168 candidates running, but was not elected and ended up as a first alternate. After the death of his party colleague Klára Valentová in early April 2019, Farský succeeded her as a municipal representative.

=== Regional politics ===
In 2008, Farský co-founded the Mayors for the Liberec Region (SLK) party, serving as chairman until 2009, and vice-chairman from November 2009. He stood down as vice-chair and left the party in 2017.

From 2008, Farsky was a member of the Liberec Regional Assembly. He resigned from this post upon his election to the Chamber of Deputies in 2010, and did not stand in the next regional elections in 2012. In regional elections in 2016, he was again elected to the Liberec Regional Assembly on the SLK candidate list. He resigned in January 2018, citing his workload.

=== Chamber of Deputies ===
Farský was elected to the Chamber of Deputies in elections in 2010, on the candidate list of TOP 09. He was re-elected in 2013, running as the lead candidate on the combined list of TOP 09 and STAN in the Liberec Region. He received nearly 16% of preference votes cast for his list. From December 2013 he was deputy vice-chair of the Constitutional Law Committee. He was one of seven Czech members elected to the Permanent Delegation to the Parliamentary Assembly of NATO in 2010.

In June 2012, Farský introduced a draft law on the contracts registry, intending to make data on public expenditure accessible online to the public apart from in exceptional cases, similar to the policy introduced in Slovakia in 2011. The bill was passed into law on 24 November 2015. He was also involved in gambling taxation and the strengthening of municipal powers to restrict slot machine gambling. He has also repeatedly proposed legislation to move certain state agencies from Prague to other regions.

In 2020, the Chamber of Deputies passed a proposal by Farsky to grant five extra days of paid vacation to camp leaders and coaches of youth sports teams.

In the 2017 legislative elections, Farsky was the national leader of STAN and their lead candidate in Prague, as STAN entered the Chamber of Deputies for the first time running on its own. Farský won 5,269 preferential votes and retained his seat. He was elected chair of the STAN parliamentary group on 23 October.

At the 10th Republican Congress on 13 April 2019, Farský was elected 1st vice-chairman of STAN, running unopposed and receiving 93% of the votes. He was re-elected to this position at the end of August 2021, again running unopposed and receiving 94% of the votes of delegates present.

In the 2021 parliamentary election, Farský was a member of STAN and leader of the Pirates and Mayors coalition list in Liberec Region, winning re-election to the Chamber of Deputies. He later became chair of the STAN parliamentary group.

=== Fulbright scholarship controversy ===
In January 2022, Farský accepted an eight-month Fulbright scholarship in the United States, and announced his intention to remain as a member of the Chamber of Deputies during that time. Critics, including former Czech prime ministers Vladimír Špidla, Mirek Topolánek, and Petr Nečas as well as opposition parties, raised concerns that he would not be focused on his work as a Deputy while completing the scholarship.

Farský argued that stepping down as a member of the Chamber of Deputies would mean deceiving those who had voted for him and for STAN. Milos Zeman accused Farský of committing fraud against his voters and not making his party trustworthy. STAN leader Vít Rakušan stated that the party had perceived the social mood about the issue. Farský also said that Czech prime minister Petr Fiala supported his decision to take leave for the scholarship. This was denied by Fiala, who said he had voiced his concerns, and would not have accepted the scholarship had he been in Farsky's position. Farský resigned his seat on 20 January 2022.

=== Member of the European Parliament ===
Farský was mentioned as a possible candidate for the European Commission in January 2023.

During the 2024 European parliament election, he ran second on the candidate list for STAN. Farský received 44,503 preferential votes and was thus elected as an MEP, together with Danuše Nerudová.

== Other activities ==
In February 2013, Farský became a board member of Aspen Institute Prague, an international non-profit organization which opened in the Czech Republic in July 2012. He also joined the board of directors of the Karel Schwarzenberg Forum shortly after it was formed in September 2013. In 2014, Farský founded the Mayors to Mayors platform, to allow municipal politicians to share knowledge and experience on topics including architecture, cultural heritage, transparency, and innovation in municipal management.

=== Awards and recognition ===
In the Křišťálová Lupa (Crystal Magnifying Glass) Awards in 2011, Farský's amendment to the lottery law on internet censorship won first place in the "anti-award" category.

In 2013, Farský was selected for the International Visitor Leadership Program (IVLP) and completed a three-week tour of US institutions on the topic of Accountability and Responsibility.

In October 2014, he was one of 14 Czechs included in a list of the 100 best innovators in Central and Eastern Europe, published by The Financial Times, the International Visegrad Fund, Google, and the Polish Res Publica magazine. Farský is also a laureate of the Pristav Prize, awarded to him in 2015 by the Czech Council for Children and Youth.

== Personal life ==
Since 2013, Farský has been the director of a Scout Centre in Semily. He has proposed the creation of a Scout Reserve in the former military area of Ralsko. His hobbies include travel, literature, hiking, cycling, and slope skiing.
