= Zdena Kašparová =

Czech politician (born 1999)

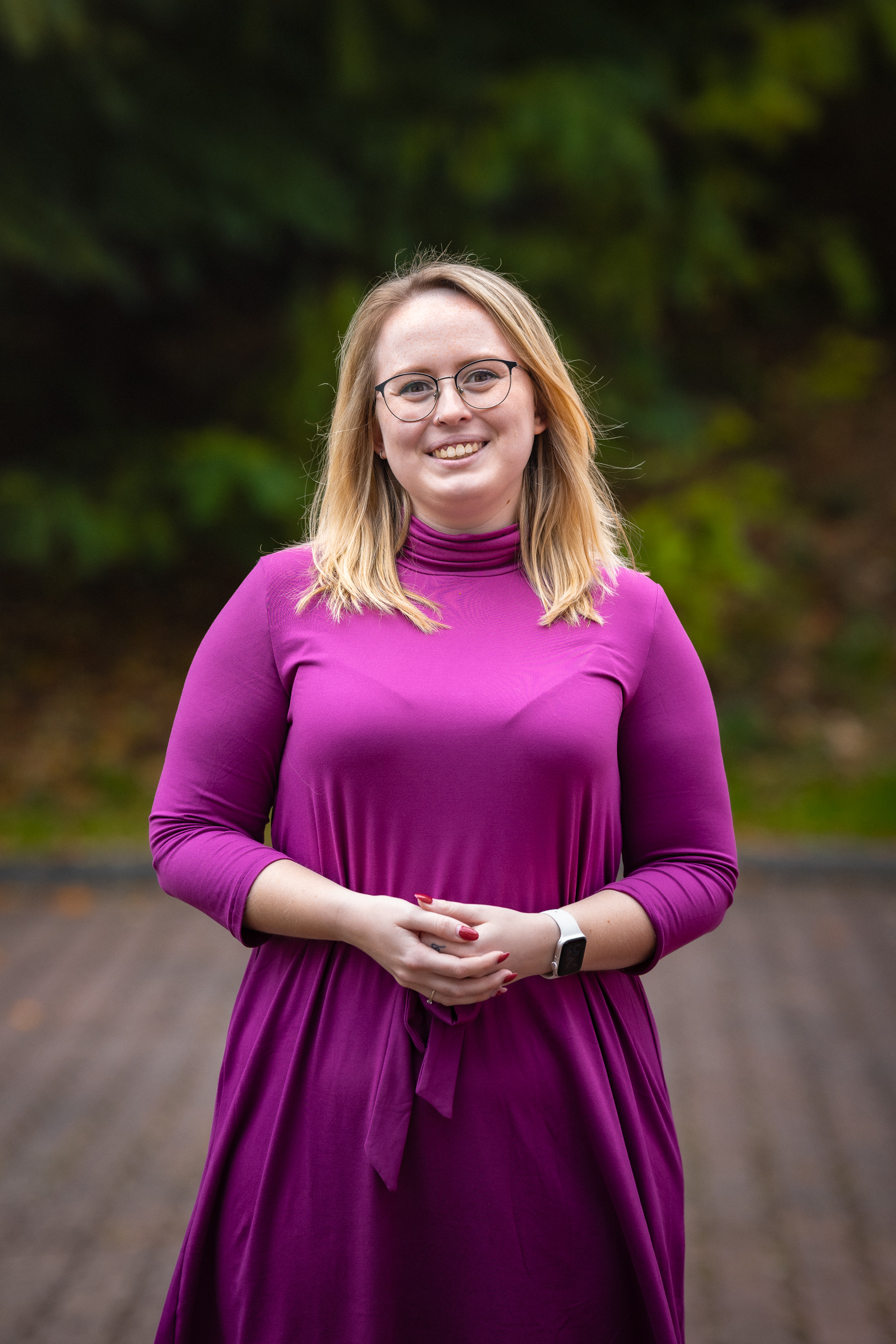

Member of the Chamber of Deputies
- Incumbent
- Assumed office 4 October 2025
- Constituency: Olomouc Region

Personal details
- Born: 22 August 1999 (age 27) Šumperk, Czech Republic
- Party: Mayors and Independents
- Education: Palacký University Olomouc

Zdena Kašparová (born 22 August 1999) is a Czech politician serving as a member of the Chamber of Deputies since 2025. She has served as chairwoman of Young Mayors and Independents since 2024.
