= Institute of Modern Politics iSTAR =

Czech think tank

- Founded: 2019
- Type: association
- Purpose: To form thoughts and visions of liberal centrist politics.
- Location: Prague, Czech Republic
- Employees: 3
- Website: https://www.i-star.cz/ (in Czech)

Institute of Modern Politics is a think-tank affiliated with Mayors and Independents. It was founded on 21 December 2018.

== History ==
Institute was founded in December 2018. Senator Zdeněk Hraba was elected its first Chairman of institute's board. Other members include Dana Drábová, Michaela Matoušková and Věslav Michalik. Barbora Urbanová became chairwoman of the institute in 2019. As of January 2021 it held 5 conferences. On 15 June 2021 it held its fifth conference called "Safe Country-Attractive Partner."
