= Michaela Šebelová =

Czech politician (born 1982)

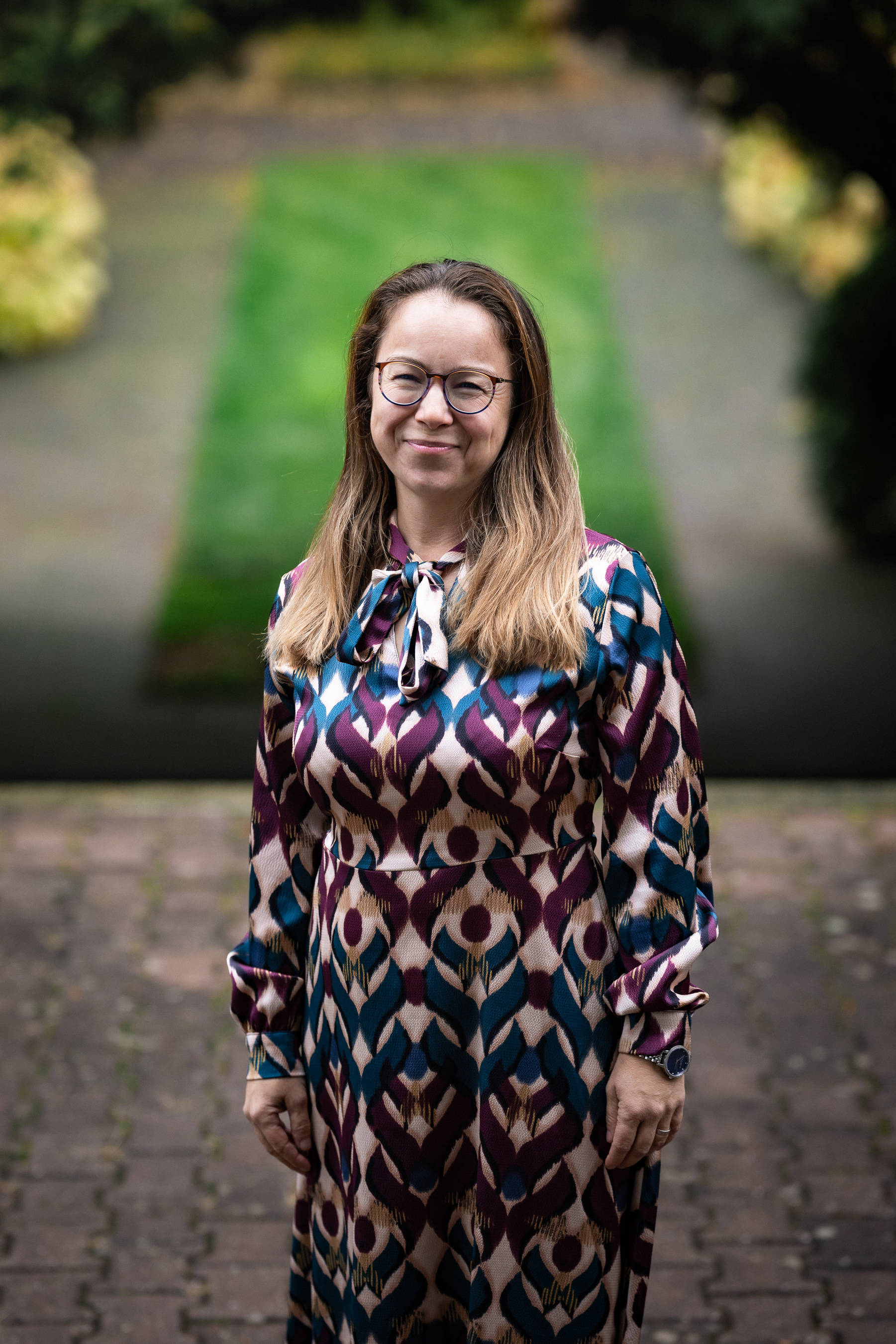
- Šebelová in 2025

Member of the Chamber of Deputies
- Incumbent
- Assumed office 9 October 2021
- Constituency: Moravian-Silesian Region

Personal details
- Born: 16 June 1982 (age 44)
- Party: Mayors and Independents (2021–)
- Education: Charles University

Michaela Šebelová (born 16 June 1982) is a Czech politician serving as a member of the Chamber of Deputies for the Mayors and Independents since 2021. From 2018 to 2022, she served as mayor of Kunčice pod Ondřejníkem.
