= 2018 Czech municipal elections =

- 5–6 October 2018

All 61,950 seats in municipal councils
- Turnout: 47.28%
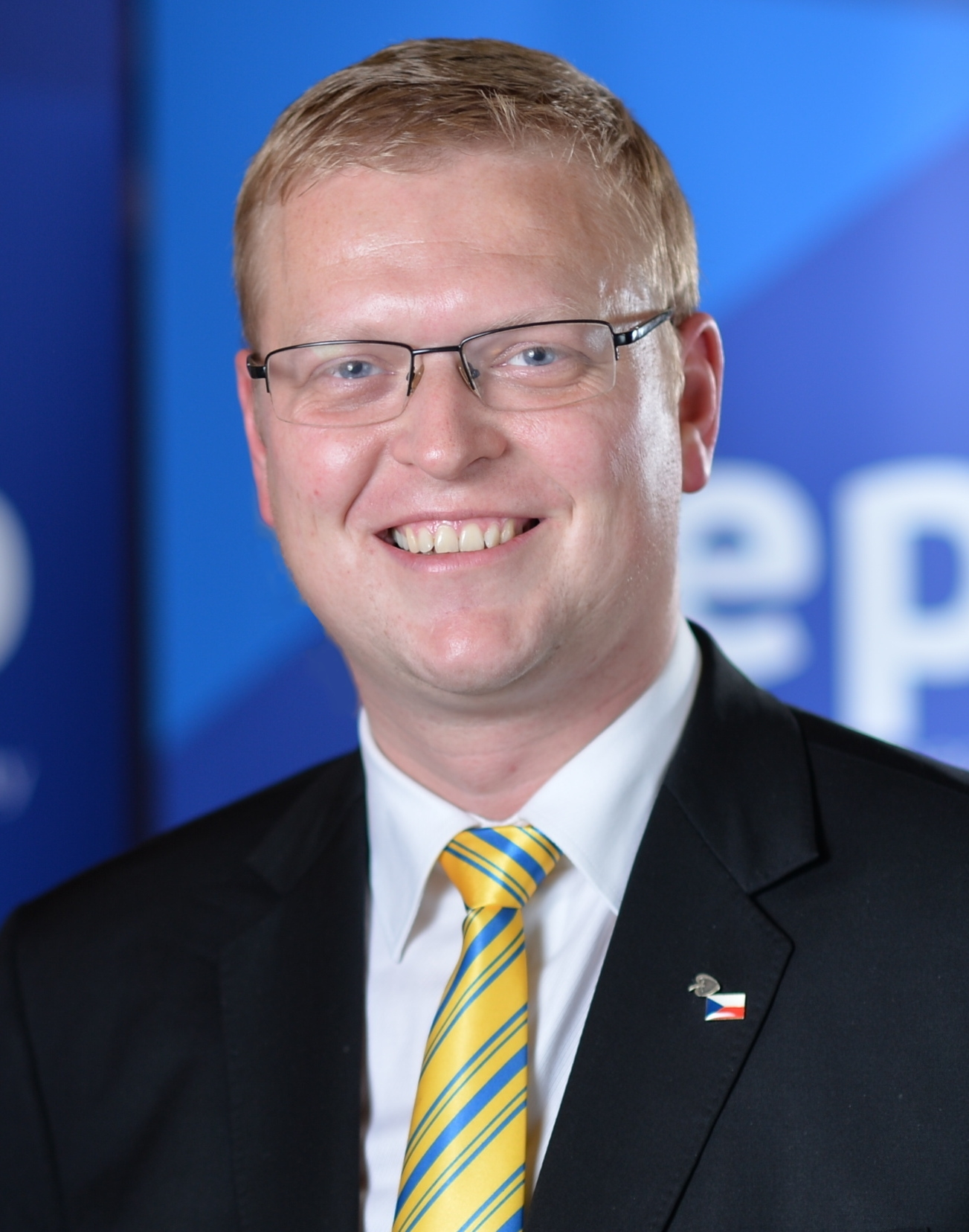

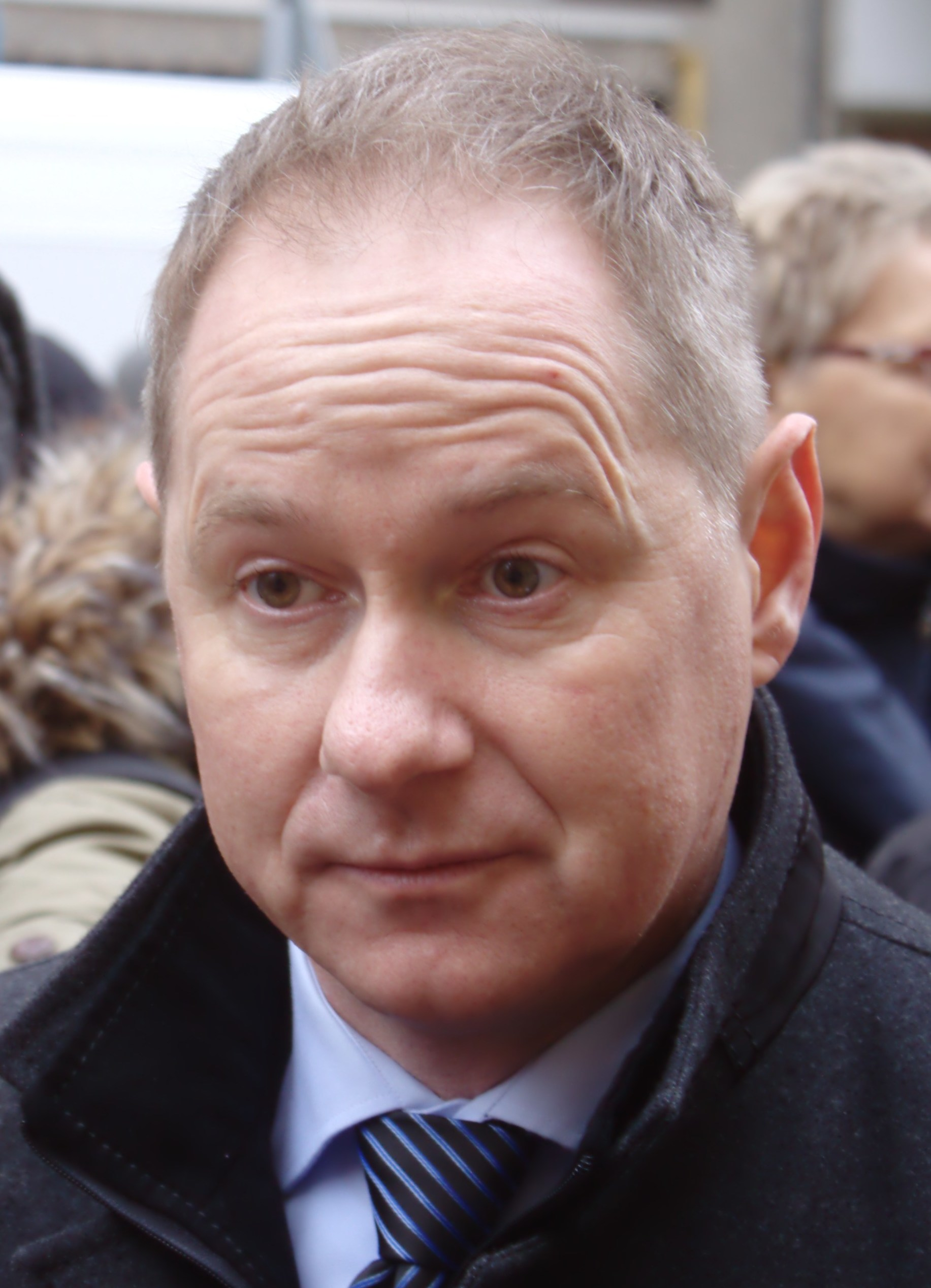

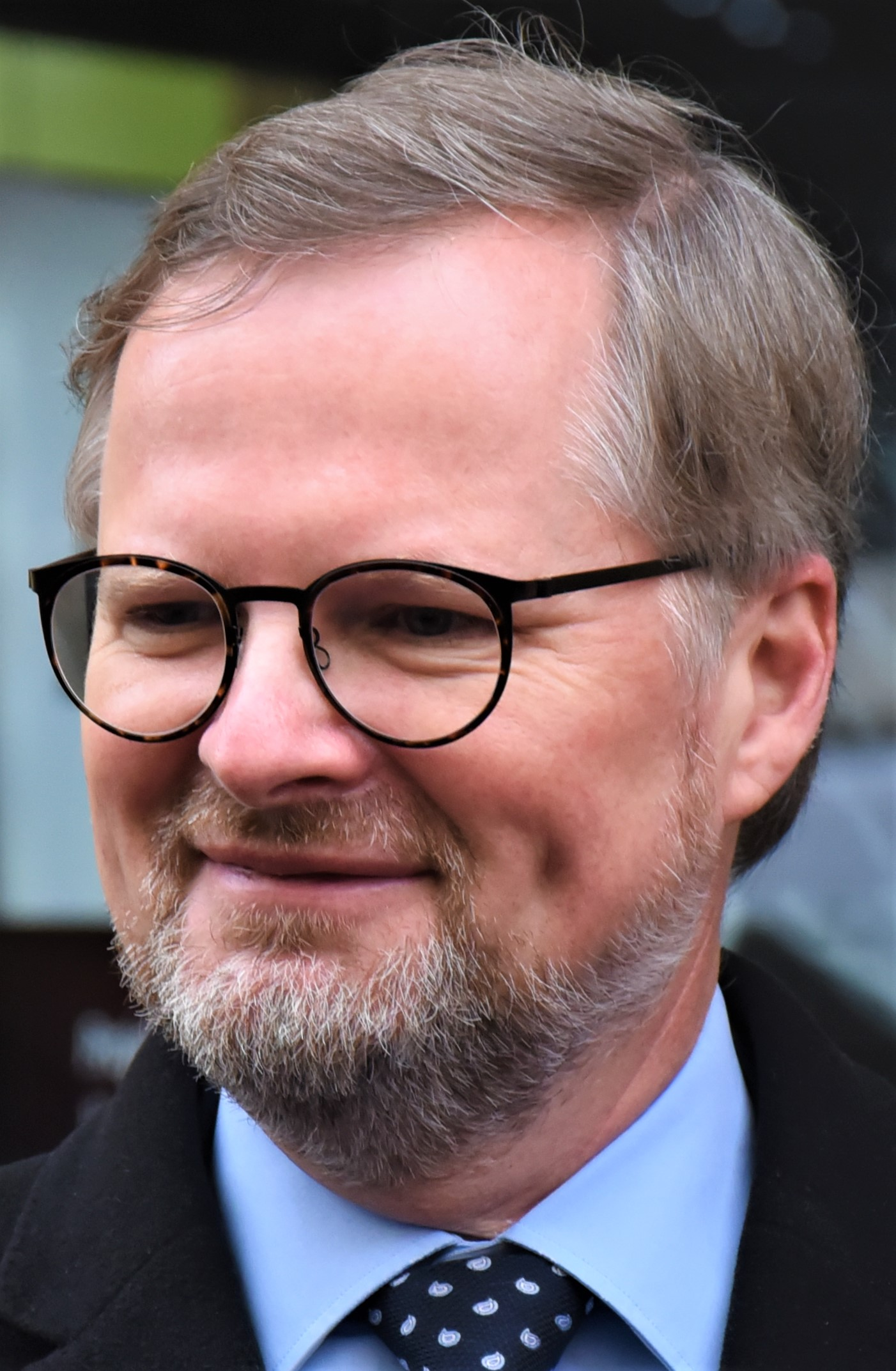

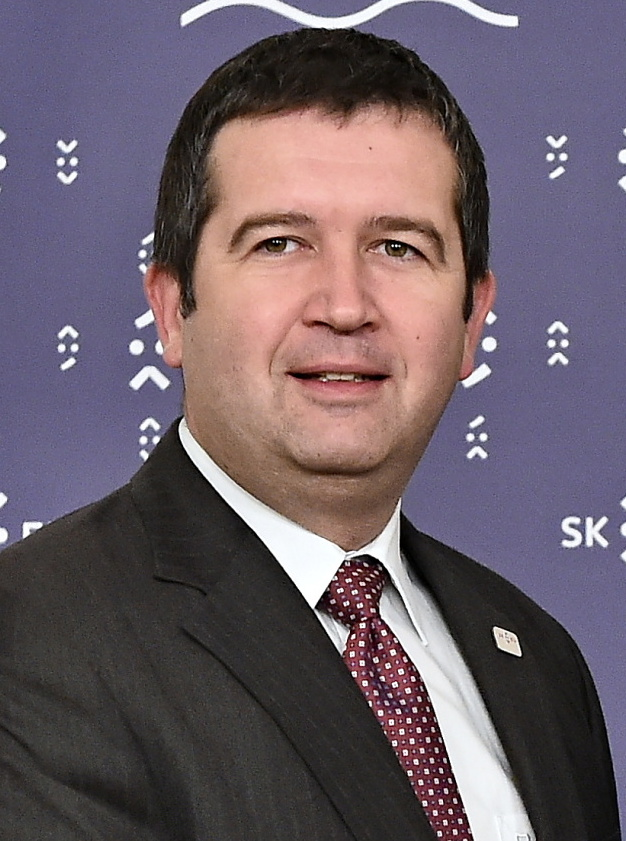

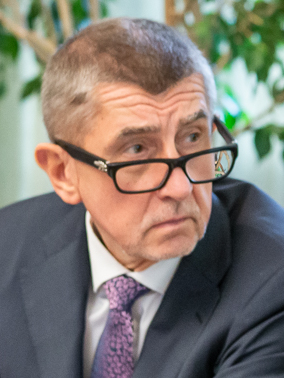

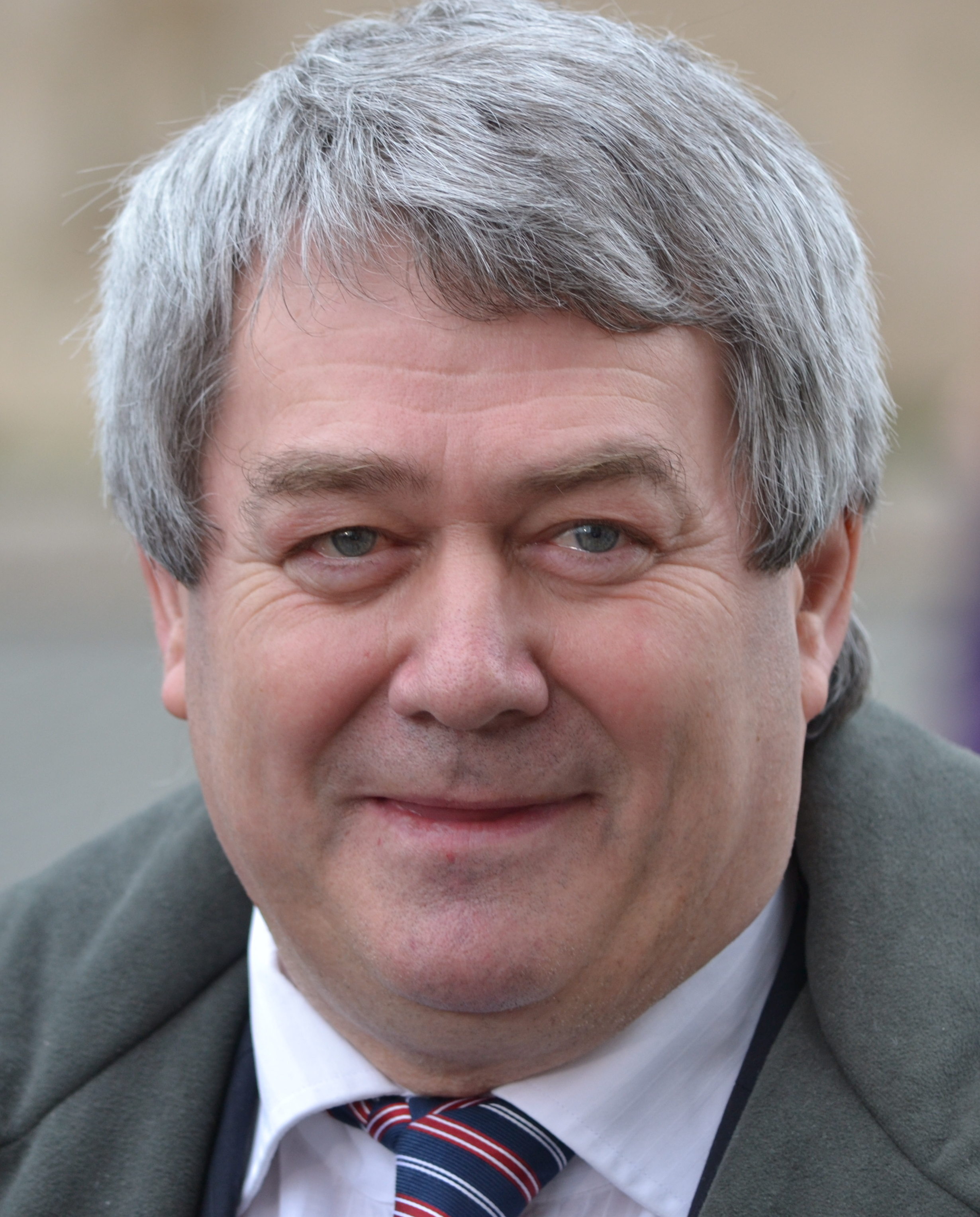
	First party	Second party	Third party
Leader	Pavel Bělobrádek	Petr Gazdík	Petr Fiala
Party	KDU-ČSL	STAN	ODS
Last election	3,999 seats	2,317 seats	2,396 seats
Seats won	3,633	2,600	2,589
Seat change	▼366	▲283	▲193
Popular vote	5,599,336	5,155,106	14,754,954
Percentage	5.02%	4.62%	13.22%
	Fourth party	Fifth party	Sixth party
Leader	Jan Hamáček	Andrej Babiš	Vojtěch Filip
Party	ČSSD	ANO	KSČM
Last election	3,796 seats	1,606 seats	2,560 seats
Seats won	1,935	1,670	1,469
Seat change	▼1,861	▲64	▼1,091
Popular vote	5,941,511	16,660,363	5,458,223
Percentage	5.32%	14.92%	4.89%
Chairman of the Unit of Municipalities before election
František Lukl
Independent
Elected Chairman of the Unit of Municipalities
František Lukl
Independent

Municipal elections were held in the Czech Republic on 5 and 6 October 2018, alongside elections for the Senate.

== Results ==
Party	Votes	%	Seats	+/–
ANO 2011	16,660,363	14.92	1,670	+64
Civic Democratic Party	14,754,954	13.22	2,589	+193
Czech Pirate Party	9,224,434	8.26	353	+324
Czech Social Democratic Party	5,941,511	5.32	1,935	–1,861
KDU-ČSL	5,599,336	5.02	3,633	–366
Communist Party of Bohemia and Moravia	5,458,223	4.89	1,469	–1,091
TOP 09	5,384,259	4.82	483	–382
Mayors and Independents	5,155,106	4.62	2,600	+283
Freedom and Direct Democracy	3,612,359	3.24	158	New
Green Party	1,999,231	1.79	182	–86
Ostravak	744,364	0.67	45	–10
Independents	638,480	0.57	213	–21
Svobodní	636,989	0.57	84	+13
Mayors for the Liberec Region	562,150	0.50	148	–
For Prague	558,605	0.50	27	–33
Health Sport Prosperity	411,509	0.37	65	+24
Non-Partisans	353,053	0.32	231	+17
Freeholder Party of the Czech Republic	335,215	0.30	59	+44
SNK European Democrats	286,068	0.26	235	–148
Other parties	6,982,713	6.25	1,265	–
Independents	26,338,266	23.59	44,506	+2,870
Total	111,637,188	100.00	61,950	–307
Total votes	3,947,236	–		
Registered voters/turnout	8,349,189	47.28		
Source: Volby
