= Convention on Nuclear Safety =

- Drafted: 17 June 1994
- Signed: 20 September 1994
- Location: Vienna, Austria
- Effective: 24 October 1996
- Condition: 22 ratifications
- Signatories: 65
- Parties: 78
- Depositary: Director General of the International Atomic Energy Agency
- Languages: Arabic, Chinese, English, French, Russian, and Spanish

The Convention on Nuclear Safety is a 1994 International Atomic Energy Agency (IAEA) treaty that governs safety rules at nuclear power plants in state parties to the convention.

The convention creates obligations on state parties to implement certain safety rules and standards at all civil facilities related to nuclear energy. These include issues of site selection; design and construction; operation and safety verification; and emergency preparedness.

The convention was adopted in Vienna, Austria, at an IAEA diplomatic conference on 17 June 1994. It was opened for signature on 20 September 1994 and has been signed by 65 states; it entered into force on 24 October 1996 after it had been ratified by 22 signatories. As of July 2015, there are 78 state parties to the Convention plus the European Atomic Energy Community. The states that have signed the treaty but have not ratified it include Algeria, Cuba, Egypt, Ghana, Iceland, Israel, Jordan, Kazakhstan, Monaco, Morocco, Nicaragua, Nigeria, Philippines, Sudan, Syria, Tunisia, and Uruguay.
