= 2012 Czech regional elections =

← 2008	12–13 October 2012	2016 →

675
- Turnout: 36.89%
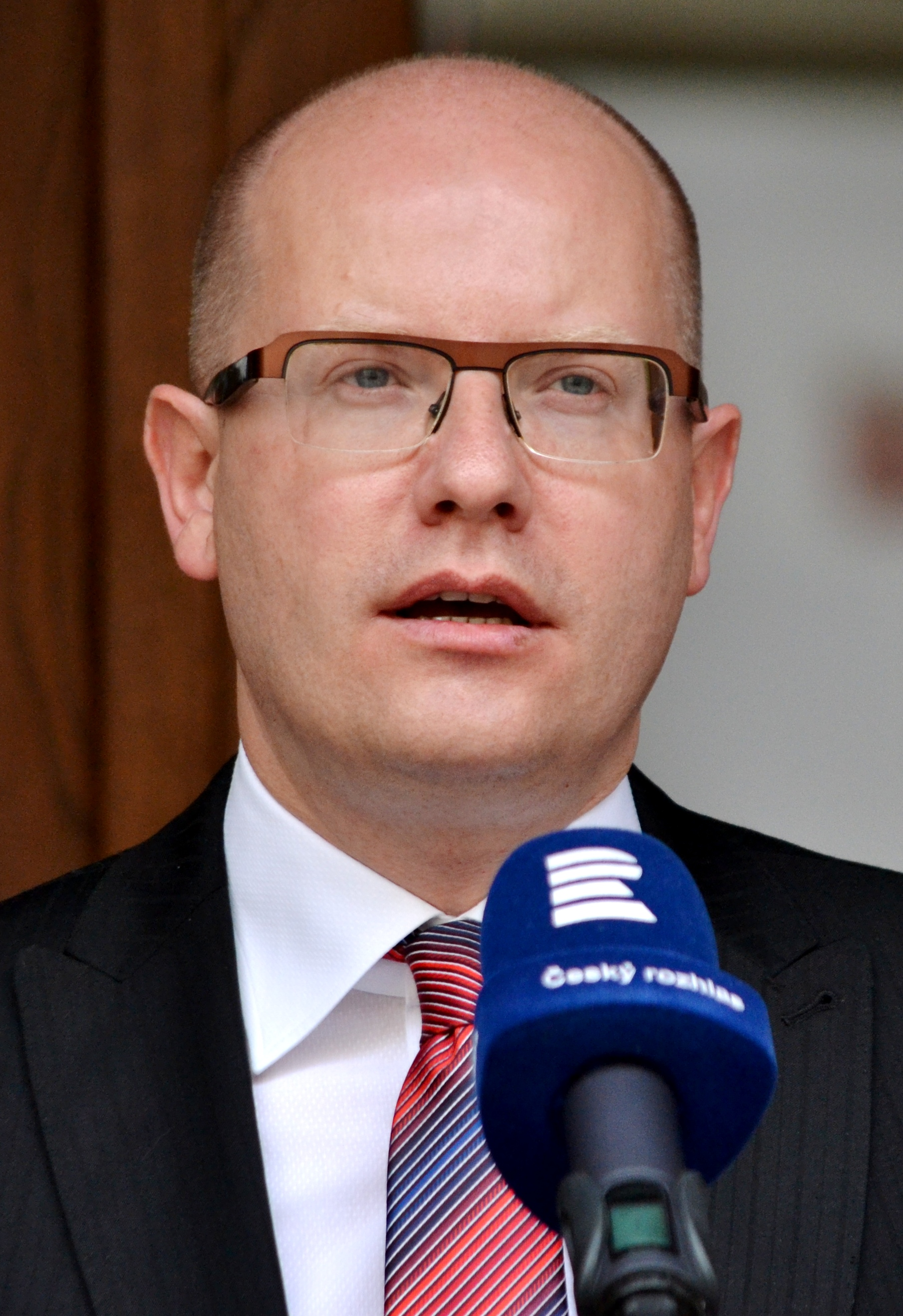

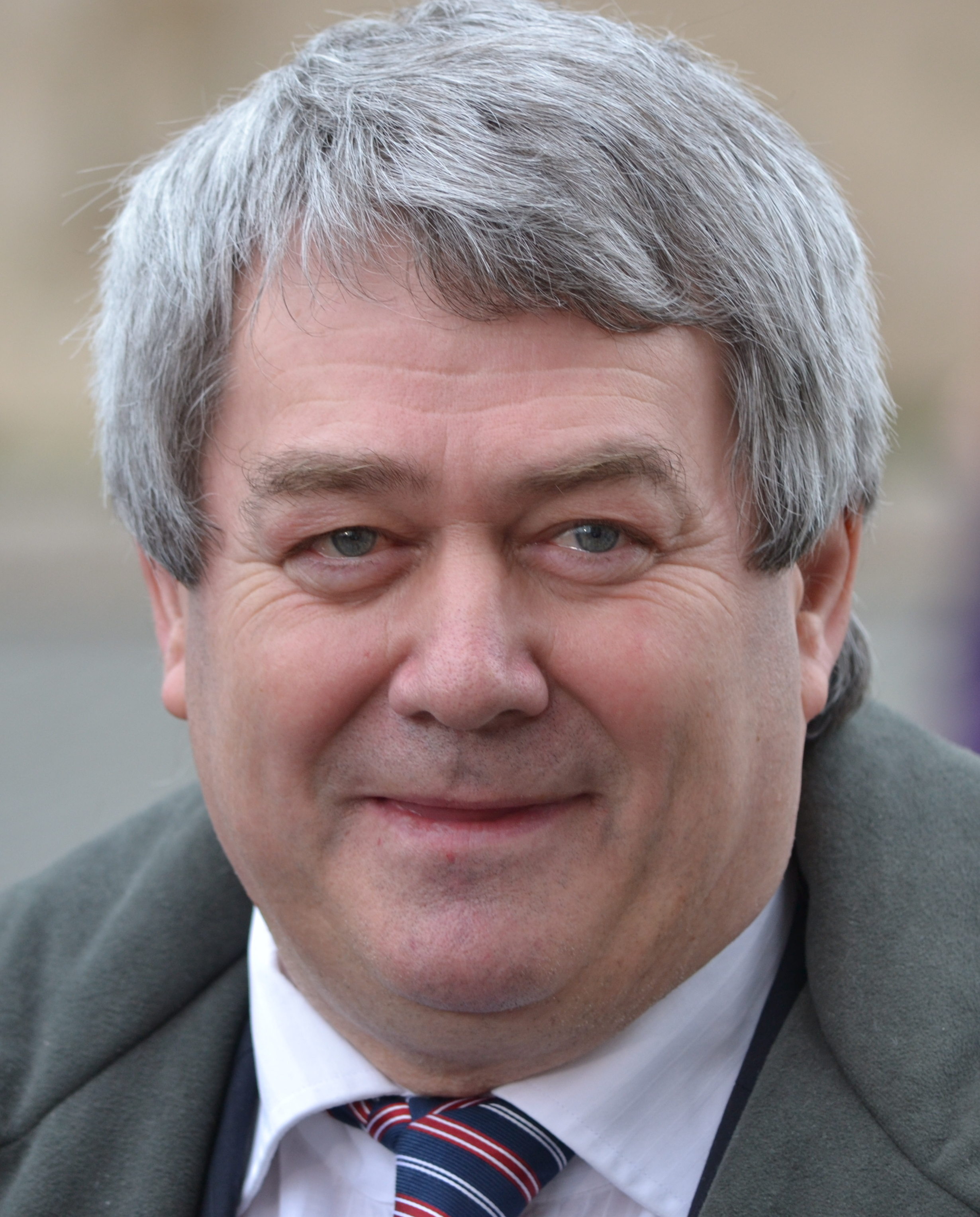

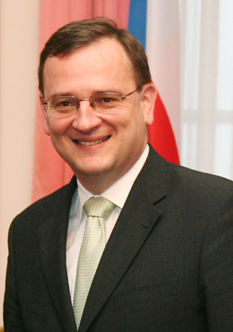
	First party	Second party	Third party
Leader	Bohuslav Sobotka	Vojtěch Filip	Petr Nečas
Party	ČSSD	KSČM	ODS
Seats won	205	182	102
Popular vote	621,961	538,953	324,081
Percentage	23.58%	20.43%	12.28%
Swing	11.27% ▼	5.40%▲	12.29% ▼
Chairman of Regional Association before election
Michal Hašek
ČSSD
Elected Chairman of Regional Association
Michal Hašek
ČSSD

The 2012 Regional Council Elections (cz. Volby do krajských zastupitelstev) were held on the 12th and 13th of October in all administrative regions (cz. Kraje) of the Czech Republic, with the exception of Prague. The election was won by the Czech Social Democratic Party (ČSSD), which received the most votes in 9 of the 13 regions despite experiencing a significant drop in voter share overall.

== Background ==
The previous regional election in 2008 had been won by the ČSSD, who had received the most votes in all participating regions. In the months leading up to the 2012 election support for them decreased, though according to polls they still remained in the lead. Similarly, the center right Civic Democratic Party (ODS) had decreased in popularity. This is likely the result of increasing loss of confidence in the traditional established parties that led to more voters choosing to support non-parliamentary, less powerful parties. Perhaps as a result of this trend, the Czech Communist Party (KSČM), which had been largely politically marginalized since the Velvet Revolution, had seen an increase in support according to polls.

== Results ==
Party	Votes (+in coalition)		Percent (+in coalition)		Number of regions contested (+in coalition)		Seats (+in coalition)	
	2008	2012	2008	2012	2008	2012	2008	2012
ČSSD	1 044 719	621 961	35,85	23,58	13	13	280	205
KSČM	438 024	538 953	15,03	20,43	13	13	114	182
ODS	687 005	324 081	23,57	12,28	13	13	180	102
KDU-ČSL	193 911 (+82 566)	153 510 (+80 623)	6,65 (+2,8)	5,82 (+3,01)	6 (+6)	5 (+8)	43 (+19)	42 (+25)
TOP 09+STAN	35 584 (+19 505)	175 089	1,22 (+0,66)	6,63	3 (+1)	13	7 (+2)	44
SZ	92 057	46 401 (+76 462)	3,15	1,75 (+2,87)	13	8 (+5)	0	0 (+8)
SPOZ	-	81 344 (+8 744)	-	3,08 (+0,33)	-	12 (+1)	-	7
Piráti	-	57 805	-	2,19	0	13	-	0

== Jihočeský kraj (South Bohemian region) ==
ČSSD won the 2008 election in the region with 33.80% of the vote and formed a coalition with ODS.

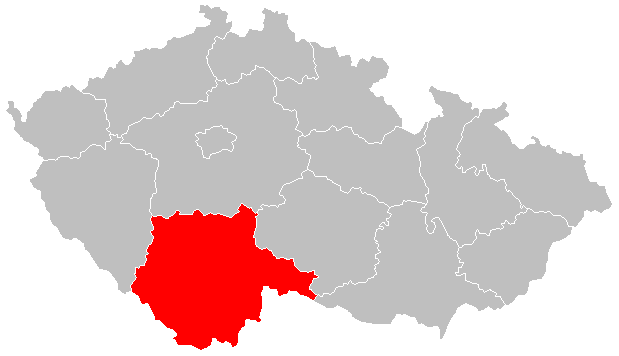

=== Polls ===
Published	18 Oct 2008	3 Sep 2012	19 Sep 2012	21 Sep 2012	13 Oct 2012
Company	Previous election	ppm factum	SC&C, STEM/MARK	Sanep	Election
ČSSD	33.80	19.4	21.0	21.1	27.99
KSČM	15.94	18.6	17.5	17.2	19.37
JIHOČEŠI 2012	-	6.8	9.0	6.9	14.57
ODS	29.63	19.3	21.0	19.1	12.56
KDU-ČSL	6.95	5.1	6.5	7.1	6.43
TOP 09 and STAN	-	12.2	10.0	7.9	5.00
SPOZ	-	3.1	2.5	5.0	2.17
Svobodní	-	2.1			1.93
DSSS ^{1}	1.20	0.7	2.0		1.81
Piráti	-	1.2	2.5		1.79
SZ	3.40	3.9	3.0	4.1	1.67
JK SNK ED and SsČR ^{2}	4.92	1.4			1.55
SBB ^{3}	0.97	1.5			1.02
Others		0.7		4.4	
Turnout	40.78	43			38.59

- ^{1} "Dělnická strana sociální spravedlnosti - STOP NEPŘIZPŮSOBIVÝM!" is a coalition of the Workers' Party and the Party for Europe, which contested the 2008 election as "Dělnická strana - za zrušení poplatků ve zdravotnictví".
- ^{2} South Bohemian coalition of SNK European Democrats and Party for an Independent Czech Republic, which contested the 2008 election as SNK European Democrats.
- ^{3} "SUVERENITA - Blok Jany Bobošíkové pro JIHOČESKÝ KRAJ" is a coalition of Sovereignty – Jana Bobošíková Bloc and Sovereignty – Party of Common Sense, which contested the 2008 election as Party of Common Sense.

=== Results ===
Party	2008			2012			Change	
Party	votes	percent	seats	votes	percent	seats	percent	seats
Czech Social Democratic Party	68 856	33.80	22	53 736	27.99	18	-5.81	-4
Communist Party of Bohemia and Moravia	32 484	15.94	10	37 187	19.37	13	+3.43	+3
JIHOČEŠI 2012	-	-	-	27 972	14.57	9	+14.57	+9
Civic Democratic Party	60 349	26.39	19	24 110	12.56	8	-13.83	-11
Christian and Democratic Union – Czechoslovak People's Party	14 170	6.95	4	12 341	6.43	4	-0.52	0
TOP 09 and Mayors for South bohemian region	-	-	-	9 614	5.00	3	+5.00	+3
votes total/turnout/seats	207 867	40,78	55	199 113	38,59	55	-2.19	

== Jihomoravský kraj (South Moravian region) ==
Czech Social Democratic Party won the 2008 election in the region with 34.84% of votes and formed a coalition with ODS.

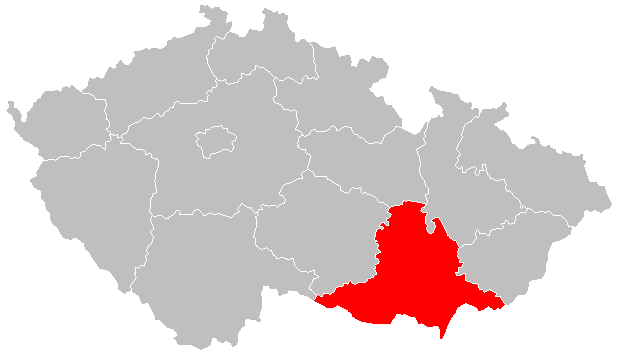

=== Polls ===
Published	18 Oct 2008	1 Oct 2012	8 Oct 2012	13 Oct 2012
Company	Previous election	SC&C, STEM/MARK	ppm factum	Election
ČSSD	34.84	30.0	26.4	27.01
KSČM	14.41	17.5	13.9	18.65
KDU-ČSL	23.89	10.5	11.2	17.03
ODS	15.88	14.5	11.6	9.21
TOP09 and STAN	-	7.5	8.9	5.86
"SN" *	-		0.6	3.89
SZ	3.64	3.5	3.9	3.68
Piráti	-	2.5	1.5	2.49
SPOZ	-		4.6	2.45
Nezávislí	1.89	3.0	4.1	2.40
Moravané	0.89	2.5	2.1	1.75
Svobodní	-		1.9	1.35
Others			6.5	
Turnout	41.05		45	37.76

- "Sdružení nestraníků"

=== Results ===
Party	2008			2012			Change	
Party	votes	percent	seats	votes	percent	seats	percent	seats
Czech Social Democratic Party	131 615	34.84	26	93 843	27.01	23	-7.83	-3
Communist Party of Bohemia and Moravia	54 443	14.41	10	64 805	18.65	16	+4.24	+6
Christian and Democratic Union – Czechoslovak People's Party	90 254	23.89	18*	59 159	17.03	14	-6.86	-4
Civic Democratic Party	60 005	15.88	11*	32 004	9.21	7	-6.67	-4
TOP 09 and Mayors for South Moravian region	-	-	-	20 379	5.86	5	+5.86	+5
votes total/turnout/seats	377 706	41.05	65	347 336	37.76	65	-3.29	

- In summer 2010 the coalition collapsed and ODS was replaced by KDU-ČSL.

== Karlovarský kraj (Karlovy Vary region) ==
ČSSD won the 2008 election in the region with 31.39% of votes and formed a coalition with the Communist Party and Doktoři (za uzdravení společnosti).

=== Polls ===
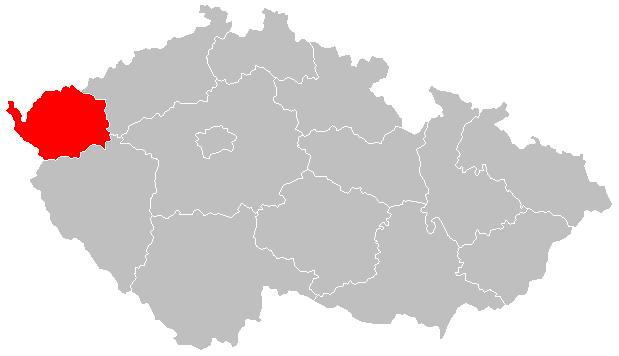

Published	18 Oct 2008	27 Aug 2012	29 Aug 2012	23 Sep 2012	13 Oct 2012
Company	Previous election	SC&C, STEM/MARK	Sanep	ppm factum	Election
KSČM	17.45	23.5	24.1	16.7	22.98
ČSSD	31.39	26.5	24.0	22.9	22.73
ODS	18.08	15.0	14.3	18.5	9.79
TOP09 and STAN	-	8.0	7.1	11.1	7.38
Alternativa *1	9.94	2.0	3.5	5.4	6.70
HNHRM *2	5.93	3.5	3.9	1.3	9.09
Koalice *2	5.93	5.0	7.5	4.5	4.66
SZ *2	2.64	5.0	7.5	4.5	4.66
Doktoři *3	9.56	-			
DSSS *4	1.23	2.5		1.3	3.34
SPOZ	-	3.0	4.2	5.3	2.83
Svobodní	-			2.4	2.44
Piráti	-	3.0	3.2	1.8	2.44
LEV 21	-		2.5	2.0	2.05
PB *5	0.33			1.4	1.18
Others					
Turnout	35.01			45	31.57

- 1 Alternativa pro kraj (Alternative for the region)
- 2 Koalice pro kraj (Coalition for the region) is a coalition of the KDU-ČSL, Greens and the movement "O Co Jim Jde?!". In the 2008 election a coalition of the same name consisted of KDU-ČSL and Hnutí nezávislých za harmonický rozvoj obcí a měst (Movement of independents for the harmonic development of municipalities) which did not join the 2012 coalition.
- 3 Doktoři (za uzdravení společnosti) (Doctors for restoration of society)
- 4 Dělnická strana sociální spravedlnosti - STOP NEPŘIZPŮSOBIVÝM! is coalition of Dělnická strana sociální spravedlnosti and Strana pro Evropu, in 2008 election as Dělnická strana - za zrušení poplatků ve zdravotnictví
- 5 Volte Pravý Blok - www.cibulka.net

=== Results ===
Party	2008			2012			Change	
Party	votes	percent	seats	votes	percent	seats	percent	seats
Communist Party of Bohemia and Moravia	14 443	17.45	8	16 580	22.98	14	+5.53	+6
Czech Social Democratic Party	25 977	31.39	16	16 402	22.73	13	-8.66	-3
Civic Democratic Party	14 967	18.80	9	7 062	9.79	5	-9.01	-4
Movement of Independents for Harmonic Development of Municipalities	4 909	5.93	3	6 558	9.09	5	+3.16	+2
TOP 09 and Mayors for Karlovy Vary region	-	-	-	5 326	7.38	4	+7.38	+4
Alternative	8 228	9.94	5	4 837	6.70	4	+3.24	+1
Doktoři (za uzdravení společnosti)	7 918	9.56	4*	-	-	-	-	-4
votes total/turnout/seats	82 742	35,01	45	72 130	31.57	45	-3.48	

- until November 2009

== Královéhradecký kraj (Hradec Králové region) ==
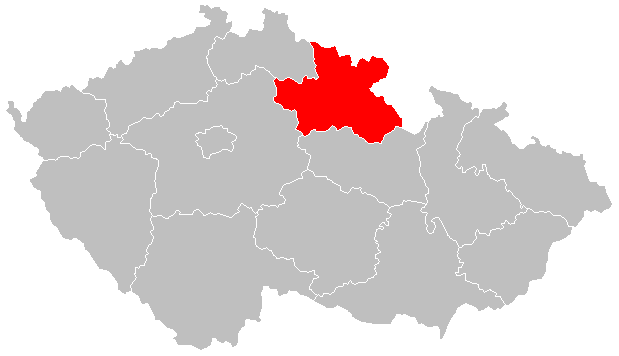

Czech Social Democratic Party won 2008 election in region with 31.94% of votes and formed coalition with Coalition for Hradec Hrálové region and SNK ED.

=== Polls ===
Published	18 Oct 2008	6 Sep 2012	10 Sep 2012	12 Sep 2012	13 Oct 2012
Company	Previous election	ppm Invenio	SC&C, STEM/MARK	Sanep	Election
ČSSD	31.94	19.9	25.5	22.8	19.73
KSČM	13.47	12.0	17.0	17.4	19.39
Koalice *1	7.68	5.4	7.0	6.5	12.07
VPK *1	4.95	5.4	7.0	6.5	12.07
ODS	24.33	23.0	18.0	16.7	10.62
TOP09 a STAN	-	13.4	13.0	8.0	8.25
Východočeši	-	3.7	2.0		7.69
Změna *2	3.97	3.6	3.0	3.5	4.09
Patrioti	-	0.4			3.97
SPOZ	-	2.2	3.5	4.6	2.76
SNK ED	6.02	1.1			2.23
Piráti	-	2.7		2.4	1.90
Svobodní	-	3.8	2.0	3.1	1.79
DSSS *3	1.02	1.1			1.51
SBB	0.81	1.7			1.09
PB *4	1.28	0.4			1.05
Others					
Turnout	41.72	41			38.43

- 1 Koalice pro Královéhradecký kraj is coalition of KDU-ČSL, Hradecký demokratický klub (Democratic club of Hradec) and Volba pro město (Vote for the City), in 2008 election of KDU-ČSL and Nestraníci (Non-partisans)
- 2 Změna pro Královéhradecký kraj is a coalition of Greens and political movement Změna (Change)
- 3 Dělnická strana sociální spravedlnosti - STOP NEPŘIZPŮSOBIVÝM! is coalition of Dělnická strana sociální spravedlnosti and Strana pro Evropu, in 2008 election as Dělnická strana - za zrušení poplatků ve zdravotnictví
- 4 Volte Pravý Blok - www.cibulka.net

=== Results ===
Party	2008			2012			Change	
Party	votes	percent	seats	votes	percent	seats	percent	seats
Czech Social Democratic Party	57 351	31.94	18	32 248	19.73	12	12.21	-6
Communist Party of Bohemia and Moravia	24 189	13.47	7	31 685	19.39	11	+5.92	+4
Coalition for Hradec Králové region	13 794	8.89	4	19 721	12.07	7	+3.1	+3
Civic Democratic Party	43 688	24.33	13	17 366	10.62	6	-13.71	-7
TOP 09 and Mayors for Hradec Králové region	-	-	-	13 483	8.25	5	+8.25	+5
Východočeši	-	-	-	12 577	7.69	4	+7.69	+4
SNK European Democrats	10 824	6.02	3	3 648	2.23	-	-3.79	-3
votes total/turnout/seats	179 522	41.72	45	163 374	38.43	45	-3.29	

== Liberecký kraj (Liberec region) ==
Czech Social Democratic Party won 2008 election in region with 26.79% of votes and formed coalition with Mayors and independents for Liberec region and Party for the Open Society.

=== Polls ===
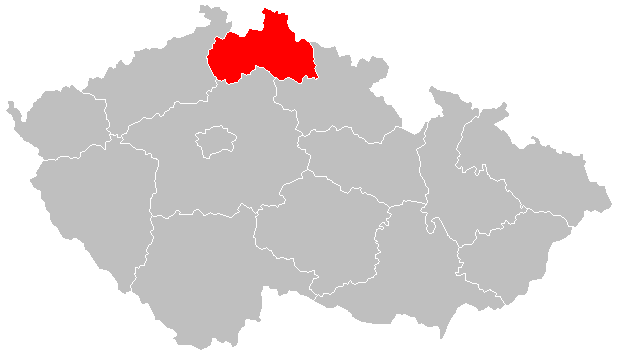

Published	18 Oct 2008	29 Aug 2012	31 Aug 2012	25 Sep 2012	13 Oct 2012
Company	Previous election	SC&C, STEM/MARK	Sanep	ppm Factum	Election
SLK	13.78	11.0	11.9	8.5	22.21
KSČM	13.89	15.5	17.1	19.2	17.89
Změna *1	4.94	10.0	7.5	5.7	16.85
ČSSD	26.79	17.5	20.2	19.1	13.05
ODS	22.50	15.0	13.4	14.9	9.26
TOP09 a STAN	-	12.0	8.7	8.4	3.52
NBPLK *2	-	3.0		3.2	2.5
SOS	6.12	2.0		1.0	2.42
Piráti	-			2.0	2.22
SPOZ	-	3.0	5.2	4.1	1.71
ČSSR *4	-			1.8	1.70
KDU-ČSL + SsČR *4	3.84	2.5	4.8	1.8	1.69
DSSS *5	0.89	2.0		0.9	1.61
Others					
Turnout	38.08			43	38.55

- 1 Změna pro Liberecký kraj (Change for Liberec region) is coalition of movement Změna (Change) and Greens, 2008 election result is that of Green Party
- 2 Nová budoucnost pro Liberecký kraj (New Future for Liberec region)
- 3 Česká strana selského rozumu
- 4 result of 2008 election is for Koalice pro Liberecký kraj, which KDU-ČSL was part of
- 5 Dělnická strana sociální spravedlnosti - STOP NEPŘIZPŮSOBIVÝM! is coalition of Dělnická strana sociální spravedlnosti and Strana pro Evropu, in 2008 election as Dělnická strana - za zrušení poplatků ve zdravotnictví

=== Results ===
Party	2008			2012			Change	
Party	votes	percent	seats	votes	percent	seats	percent	seats
Mayors for Liberec Region	17 878	13.78	7	28 763	22.21	13	+8.43	+5
Communist Party of Bohemia and Moravia	18 018	13.89	8	23 167	17.89	10	+4.00	+2
Change for Liberec region	6 415	4.94	-	21 829	16.85	10	+9.91	+10
Czech Social Democratic Party	34 749	26.79	15	16 900	13.05	7	-13.74	-8
Civic Democratic Party	29 187	22.50	12	11 993	9.26	5	-13.24	-7
Party for the Open Society	7 937	6.12	3	3 146	2.42	-	-3.70	-3
votes total/turnout/seats	129 668	38.08	45	129 482	38.55	45	+0.47	

== Moravskoslezský kraj (Moravian-Silesian region) ==
Czech Social Democratic Party won 2008 election in region with 42.63% of votes and formed coalition with Communist Party of Bohemia and Moravia.

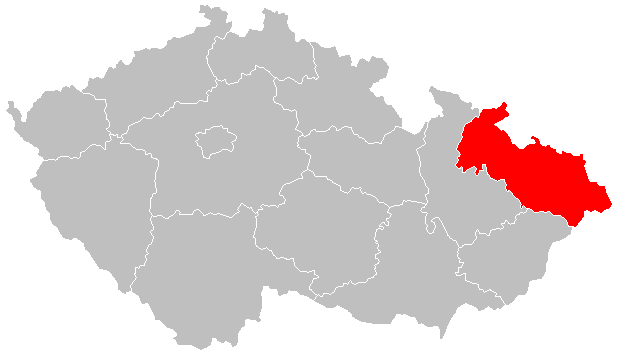

=== Polls ===
Published	18 Oct 2008	27 Aug 2012	3 Oct 2012	5 Oct 2012	13 Oct 2012
Company	Previous election	ppm Factum	SC&C, STEM/MARK	Sanep	Election
ČSSD	42.63	27.3	33.0	28.2	27.40
KSČM	15.92	17.1	23.5	20.3	22.78
ODS	24.90	17.1	14.5	12.7	9.92
KDU-ČSL	7.10	8.0	6.5	7.3	8.60
Nezávislí	-	4.9	4.0	4.3	5.72
SPOZ	-	3.7	2.5	7.1	4.56
TOP09 a STAN MSK	-	7.7	4.0	4.2	4.32
SZ	2.14	2.3	3.0	2.1	2.79
Piráti	-	1.0	2.0		2.17
DSSS*1	1.00	1.5	2.0		2.15
KSČ	-	0.6			2.05
SNK*2	2.96	1.8			1.58
SBB *3	0.27	0.8		2.3	1.15
Protest *4	-			0.5	1.12
Others					
Turnout	38.6	41			33.17

- 1 Dělnická strana sociální spravedlnosti - STOP NEPŘIZPŮSOBIVÝM! is coalition of Dělnická strana sociální spravedlnosti and Strana pro Evropu, in 2008 election as Dělnická strana - za zrušení poplatků ve zdravotnictví
- 2 SNK is coalition of SNK ED and Město lidem (City to the people), in 2008 election of SNK ED and Coexistentia
- 3 SUVERENITA - Blok Jany Bobošíkové pro MORAVSKOSLEZSKÝ KRAJ is coalition of SUVERENITA - Blok Jany Bobošíkové and SUVERENITA - STRANA DŮSTOJNÉHO ŽIVOTA, in 2008 election as Strana důstojného života
- 4 Protest - nevolím parlamentní strany is coalition of Občané 2011, Strana práce and Občané.cz

=== Results ===
Party	2008			2012			Change	
Party	votes	percent	seats	votes	percent	seats	percent	seats
Czech Social Democratic Party	162 410	42.63	31	87 688	27.40	24	-15.23	-7
Communist Party of Bohemia and Moravia	60 672	15.92	11	72 912	22.78	20	+6.86	+9
Civic Democratic Party	94 869	24.90	18	31 744	9.92	9	-14.98	-9
Christian and Democratic Union – Czechoslovak People's Party	27 053	7.10	5	27 536	8.60	7	+1.50	+2
Independents	-	-	-	18 311	5.72	5	+5.72	+5
votes total/turnout/seats	380 896	38.60	65	319 979	33.17	65	-5.43	

== Olomoucký kraj (Olomouc region) ==
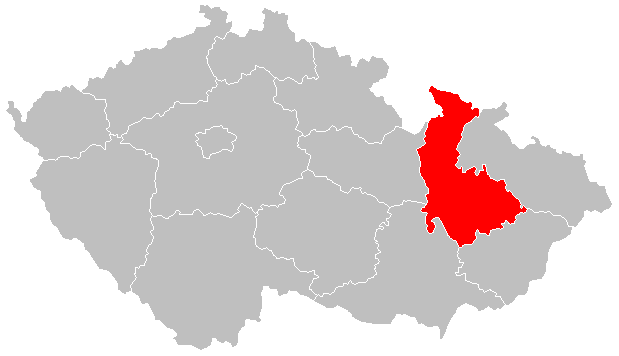

Czech Social Democratic Party won the 2008 election in this region with 39.78% of votes and formed a coalition with Civic Democratic Party and KDU-ČSL.

=== Polls ===
Published	18 Oct 2008	26 Sep 2012	26 Sep 2012	2 Oct 2012	13 Oct 2012
Company	Previous election	SC&C, STEM/MARK	Sanep	ppm Factum	Election
ČSSD	39.78	27.5	26.6	24.3	26.70
KSČM	15.80	20.5	21.1	16.3	22.82
Koalice (KDU-ČSL and SZ)*1	8.75	4.5	5.5	5.0	11.00
Koalice (KDU-ČSL and SZ)*1	2.73	4.5	5.5	5.0	11.00
ODS	20.34	16.5	13.1	17.7	10.91
TOP09 and STAN*2	3.32	10.5	5.9	10.4	6.16
Nezávislí	2.21	4.5	5.4	8.4	4.95
SPOZ	-	4.0	6.1	4.9	3.30
NV*3	-				1.2
SBB*4	0.37		5.3	1.1	2.13
SDŽ*4	0.56		5.3	1.1	2.13
Piráti	-	2.0	2.3	2.5	2.11
Moravané	0.94	2.0	2.6	3.7	1.92
Svobodní	-			2.0	1.49
Others					
Turnout	38.50			39	35.67

- 1 Koalice pro Olomoucký kraj společně se starosty (Coalition for Olomouc region together with Mayors) is coalition of SZ and KDU-ČSL, in 2008 election the parties ran independently.
- 2 in 2008 election as Nezávislí starostové pro kraj (Independent Mayors for region)
- 3 Nezávislá volba
- 4 SUVERENITA - Blok Jany Bobošíkové - ZMĚNA PRO OLOMOUCKÝ KRAJ is coalition of SUVERENITA - Blok Jany Bobošíkové and SUVERENITA - STRANA DŮSTOJNÉHO ŽIVOTA, in 2008 independently as Strana zdravého rozumu and Strana důstojného života

=== Results ===
Party	2008			2012			Change	
Party	votes	percent	seats	votes	percent	seats	percent	seats
Czech Social Democratic Party	77 556	39.78	27	47 238	26.70	19	-13.08	-8
Communist Party of Bohemia and Moravia	30 809	15.80	10	40 379	22.82	16	+6.98	+6
Coalition for Olomouc region with Mayors (KDU-ČSL and SZ)	17 076	8.75	5	19 459	11.00	8	-0.48	+3
Coalition for Olomouc region with Mayors (KDU-ČSL and SZ)	5 341	2.73	-	19 459	11.00	8	-0.48	+3
Civic Democratic Party	39 656	20.34	13	19 308	10.91	8	-9.43	-5
TOP 09 and Mayors for Olomouc region	6 475	3.32	-	10 905	6.16	4	+2.84	+4
votes total/turnout/seats	194 946	38.50	55	176 884	35.67	55	-2.83	

== Pardubický kraj (Pardubice region) ==
Czech Social Democratic Party won 2008 election in region with 35.73% of votes and formed coalition with Coalition for Pardubice region.

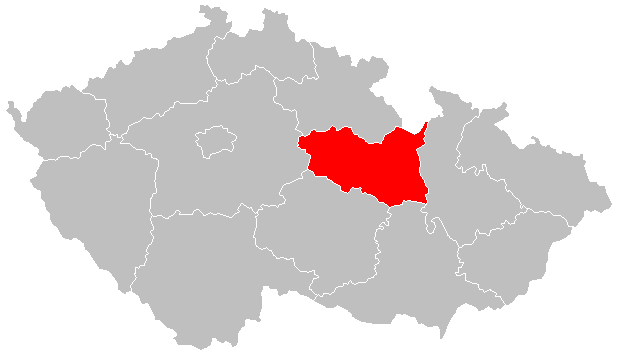

=== Polls ===
Published	18 Oct 2008	27 Aug 2012	5 Sep 2012	9 Sep 2012	13 Oct 2012
Company	Previous election	ppm Invenio	SC&C, STEM/MARK	Sanep	Election
ČSSD	35.73	17.6	23.5	22.4	21.31
KSČM	13.00	10.7	18.0	20.8	18.86
Koalice*1	18.59	10.7	8.5	9.2	17.74
ODS	20.80	20.8	16.0	16.8	10.90
TOP09 a STAN*2	3.66	12.4	11.4	6.0	6.25
SPOZ	-	5.3	4.5	6.2	5.31
Nezávislí	-	4.0	5.0	4.2	3.76
Východočeši	-	3.3	2.0	2.1	3.20
SsČR	-	1.6			2.20
Piráti	-	0.5	2.5	2.2	1.84
SZ	2.40	3.3	2.0	2.4	1.66
Svobodní	-	2.0			1.52
DSSS*3	1.28	1.4			1.43
SBB	1.00	2.6			1.25
PB *4	0.83	0.3			1.10
Others					
Turnout	42.61	39			39.47

- 1 Koalice pro Pardubický kraj is coalition of KDU-ČSL, SNK ED and Nestraníci
- 2 in 2008 as Nezávislí starostové pro kraj
- 3 Dělnická strana sociální spravedlnosti - STOP NEPŘIZPŮSOBIVÝM! is coalition of Dělnická strana sociální spravedlnosti and Strana pro Evropu, in 2008 election as Dělnická strana - za zrušení poplatků ve zdravotnictví
- 4 Volte Pravý Blok - www.cibulka.net

=== Results ===
Party	2008			2012			Change	
Party	votes	percent	seats	votes	percent	seats	percent	seats
Czech Social Democratic Party	61 900	35.73	19	33 130	21.31	12	-14.42	-7
Communist Party of Bohemia and Moravia	22 524	13.00	6	29 332	18.86	11	+5.86	+5
Coalition for Pardubice region	32 219	18.59	9	27 582	17.74	10	-0.85	+1
Civic Democratic Party	36 042	20.80	11	16 953	10.90	6	-9.90	-5
TOP 09 and Mayors for Pardubice region	6 342	3.66	-	9 722	6.25	3	+2.59	+3
Party of Civic Rights - Zemanovci	-	-	-	8 256	5.31	3	+5.31	+3
votes total/turnout/seats	173 233	42.61	45	155 464	39.47	45	-3.14	

== Plzeňský kraj (Plzeň region) ==
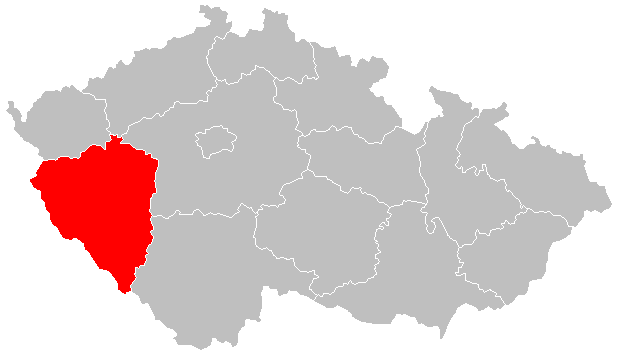

Czech Social Democratic Party won 2008 election in region with 36.37% of votes and formed coalition with support of communists.

=== Polls ===
Published	18 Oct 2008	12 Sep 2012	14 Sep 2012	26 Sep 2012	13 Oct 2012
Company	Previous election	SC&C, STEM/MARK	Sanep	ppm Factum	Election
ODS	26.76	20.0	19.8	25.0	26.48
ČSSD	36.37	23.5	25.4	24.6	24.89
KSČM	17.53	16.5	18.3	13.6	20.93
STAN a TOP09	-	14.0	8.2	9.5	5.50
Koalice*1	7.21	4.5	5.4	3.1	4.65
SPOZ	-	5.0	6.5	6.7	3.42
SNK*2	-			0.9	2.86
Piráti	-	2.5	2.5	3.9	2.68
SZ	3.81	2.8	2.7	3.9	2.09
DSSS*3	1.47	4.0	3.3	1.7	1.56
SSO	-	1.9	2.3	0.9	1.26
"SN"*4	-			2.3	1.16
Others					
Turnout	40.28			42	38.21

- 1 Koalice pro Plzeňský kraj is coalition of KDU-ČSL, SsČR and Nezávislí, in 2008 election of KDU-ČSL and SNK ED
- 2 Sdružení pro náš kraj - SNK
- 3 Dělnická strana sociální spravedlnosti - STOP NEPŘIZPŮSOBIVÝM! is coalition of Dělnická strana sociální spravedlnosti and Strana pro Evropu, in 2008 election as Dělnická strana-Ne americkému radaru
- 4 "Sdružení nestraníků"

=== Results ===
Party	2008			2012			Change	
Party	votes	percent	seats	votes	percent	seats	percent	seats
Civic Democratic Party	47 879	26.76	14	44 160	26.48	15	-0.28	+1
Czech Social Democratic Party	65 066	36.37	19	41 519	24.89	15	-11.48	-4
Communist Party of Bohemia and Moravia	31 369	17.53	9	34 919	20.39	12	+2.86	+3
TOP 09 and Mayors for Plzeň region	-	-	-	9 175	5.5	3	+5.5	+3
Coalition for Plzeň region (KDU-ČSL and SNK ED)	12 899	7.21	3	7 758	4.65	-	-2.56	-3
votes total/turnout/seats	178 865	40.28	45	166 758	38.21	45	-2.07	

== Středočeský kraj (Central Bohemian region) ==
Czech Social Democratic Party won 2008 election in region with 35.16% of votes and formed a government with support of communists.

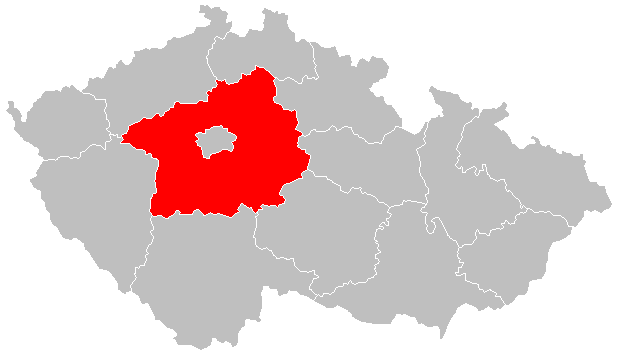

=== Polls ===
Published	18 Oct 2008	4 Oct 2012	7 Oct 2012	9 Oct 2012	13 Oct 2012
Company	Previous election	ppm Factum	SC&C, STEM/MARK	Sanep	Election
ČSSD	35.16	20.5	24.5	20.3	21.79
KSČM	13.75	9.4	17.0	14.3	20.57
ODS	32.81	20.2	20.0	21.1	18.32
TOP09 and STAN*1	5.73	12.8	11.5	11.8	11.71
"SN"*2	-	2.1	2.0	2.0	3.17
KDU-ČSL and SNK ED*3	3.44	2.9	3.0	3.2	3.07
Piráti	-	3.0	2.5	2.1	3.03
SZ	3.00	2.4	4.5	3.0	2.59
SPOZ and Češi	-	6.2	2.5	5.3	2.49
Svobodní	-	1.8	2.0		2.35
HNPD*4	-	1.0			1.64
PB*5	0.88	1.2			1.55
SBB*6	0.82	3.0			1.51
UNP-STŘČ*7	-	0.6		2.0	1.42
Others					
Turnout	41.05	42			36.45

- 1 in 2008 as Nezávislí starostové pro Středočeský kraj
- 2 "Sdružení nestraníků"
- 3 Koalice KDU-ČSL, SNK ED a nezávislých, in 2008 election as Koalice pro Středočeský kraj
- 4 Hnutí na podporu dobrovolných hasičů a dalších dobrovolníků
- 5 Volte Pravý Blok - www.cibulka.net
- 6 SUVERENITA - blok Jany Bobošíkové, Strana zdravého rozumu, in 2008 as Strana zdravého rozumu
- 7 UNP - Středočeši 2012

=== Results ===
Party	2008			2012			Change	
Party	votes	percent	seats	votes	percent	seats	percent	seats
Czech Social Democratic Party	139 564	35.16	26	76 225	21.79	20	-13.37	-6
Communist Party of Bohemia and Moravia	54 594	13.75	10	71 975	20.57	19	+6.82	+9
Civic Democratic Party	130 242	32.81	25	64 101	18,32	16	-14,49	-9
TOP 09 and Mayors for Central Bohemian region	22 767	5.73	4	40 981	11.71	10	+5.98	+6
votes total/turnout/seats	396 873	42.14	65	349 796	36.45	65	-5.69	

== Ústecký kraj (Ústí region) ==
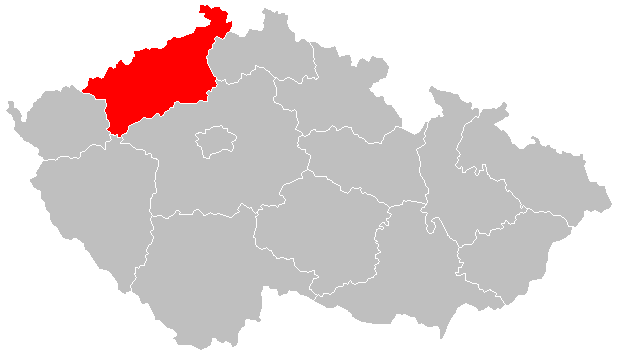

Czech Social Democratic Party won 2008 election in region with 32.78% of votes and formed coalition with Civic Democratic Party and Mirko Bernas who left Severočeši.cz.

=== Polls ===
Published	18 Oct 2008	17 Sep 2012	24 Sep 2012	29 Sep 2012	13 Oct 2012
Company	Previous election	ppm Factum	SC&C, STEM/MARK	Sanep	Election
KSČM	18.39	16.2	22.0	19.4	25.26
ČSSD	32.78	21.4	20.5	21.0	16.13
Severočeši.cz	13.20	8.5	11.5	8.3	12.02
ODS	20.57	15.1	14.5	13.4	9.68
PRO! kraj*1	4.29	1.3	2.5	4.2	8.15
TOP09 and STAN	-	7.4	5.5	5.0	4.67
DSSS*2	1.19	1.3	4.0	2.2	4.37
SNK ED and SZSP*3	1.54+3.07	0.6			3.63
LEV 21	-	3.6	3.0	8.1	2.79
SPOZ	-	6.0	2.5	5.2	2.32
KSČ	-	0.9			2.21
NO!*4	1.06	3.6	2.5	2.8	1.93
Piráti	-	2.8	2.0	2.1	1.88
Svobodní	-	2.8	2.5		1.55
Sovereignty*5	0.39	3.0			1.22
Others					
Turnout	37.44	42			33.94

- 1 PRO! kraj is coalition of SZ, KDU-ČSL, HNHRM, Koalice pro Benešov and B10, in 2008 election as SZ
- 2 Dělnická strana sociální spravedlnosti - STOP NEPŘIZPŮSOBIVÝM! is coalition of Dělnická strana sociální spravedlnosti and Strana pro Evropu, in 2008 election as Dělnická strana - za zrušení zdravotnických poplatků
- 3 Koalice SNK Evropští demokraté a Strana Zdraví, Sportu a Prosperity, in 2008 election ran independently
- 4 NESPOKOJENÍ OBČANÉ!
- 5 in 2008 as Party of Common Sense

=== Results ===
Party	2008			2012			Change	
Party	votes	percent	seats	votes	percent	seats	percent	seats
Communist Party of Bohemia and Moravia	44 459	18.39	12	53 819	25.26	20	+6.87	+8
Czech Social Democratic Party	79 219	32.78	22	34 360	16.13	13	-16.65	-9
Severočeši.cz	31 910	13.20	8	25 617	12.02	9	-1.18	+1
Civic Democratic Party	49 715	20.57	13	20 635	9.68	7	-10.89	-4
For Region!	10 374	4.29	-	17 372	8.15	6	+3.86	+6
votes total/turnout/seats	241 643	37.44	55	213 000	33.94	55	-3.50	

== kraj Vysočina (Vysočina region) ==
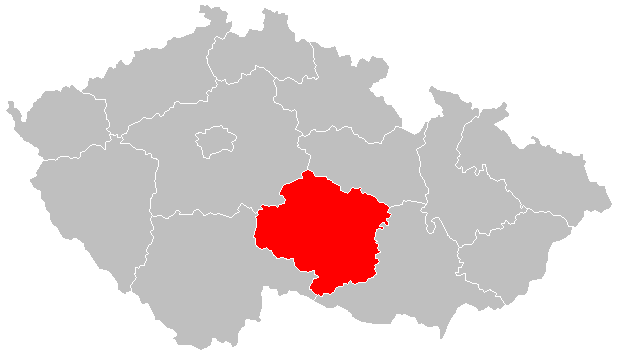

Czech Social Democratic Party won 2008 election in region with 39.87% of votes and formed coalition with support of communists.

=== Polls ===
Published	18 Oct 2008	3 Sep 2012	5 Sep 2012	12 Sep 2012	13 Oct 2012
Company	Previous election	SC&C, STEM/MARK	Sanep	ppm Factum	Election
ČSSD	39.87	27.5	23.4	23.1	29.26
KSČM	15.72	19.0	21.8	14.8	19.57
KDU-ČSL	10.81	10.0	9.6	12.2	12.33
ODS	21.01	13.0	12.6	17.7	10.29
PRO VYS*1	3.79	5.0	6.1	5.9	6.38
TOP09 a STAN	-	8.0	5.6	10.9	5.05
STO*2	-	2.0		0.7	4.46
SPOZ	-	6.0	10.1	4.5	4.26
SZ	2.65	2.5		3.1	2.04
Piráti	-			1.6	1.59
Svobodní	-	2.0	2.1	1.3	1.28
Others					
Turnout	44.88			45	41.05

- 1 Pro Vysočinu is coalition of SNK ED and Nestraníci, result of 2008 election is of SNK ED only
- 2 Starostové pro občany

=== Results ===
Party	2008			2012			Change	
Party	votes	percent	seats	votes	percent	seats	percent	seats
Czech Social Democratic Party	72 004	39.87	21	48 022	29.26	17	-10.61	-4
Communist Party of Bohemia and Moravia	28 394	15.72	8	32 119	19.57	11	+3.85	+3
Christian and Democratic Union – Czechoslovak People's Party	19 534	10.81	5	20 243	12.33	7	+1.48	+2
Civic Democratic Party	37 946	21.01	11	16 888	10.29	5	-10.72	-6
For Vysočina	6 847	3.79	-	10 476	6.38	3	+2.59	+3
TOP 09 and Mayors for Vysočina	-	-	-	8 302	5.09	2	+5.09	+2
votes total/turnout/seats	180 556	44,88	45	164 072	41.05	45	-3.83	

== Zlínský kraj (Zlín region) ==
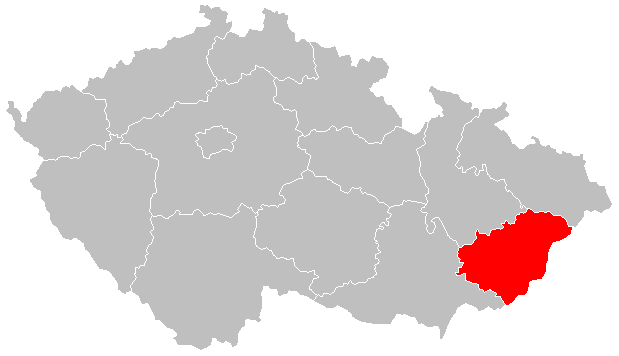

Czech Social Democratic Party won 2008 election in region with 35.40% of votes and formed coalition with Civic Democratic Party and Christian Democrats.

=== Polls ===
Published	18 Oct 2008	27 Aug 2012	17 Sep 2012	19 Sep 2012	13 Oct 2012
Company	Previous election	ppm Factum	SC&C, STEM/MARK	Sanep	Election
ČSSD	35.40	21.2	23.0	22.3	21.73
KDU-ČSL	13.35	12.5	11.5	12.1	18.31
KSČM	11.18	11.6	16.0	15.5	16.08
STAN a TOP09*1	10.08	12.1	7.5	9.0	10.09
ODS	21.96	20.6	15.5	16.4	9.49
SPOZ	-	4.3	6.0	7.9	7.21
LOOK*2	-	0.8			2.59
ZVUK 2012	-	0.4			2.16
Nezávislí*3	3.18	4.6	4.0	3.5	1.69
SZ	2.07	3.0	2.0	2.1	1.57
Piráti	-	2.1	3.5	2.3	1.41
Moravané	0.89	1.6	2.0		1.25
MOR*4	-	0.6			1.22
SSO	-	0.4	2.5		1.16
HOZK*5	-	1.9			1.09
Others					
Turnout	41.13	42			40.34

- 1 Starostové a TOP 09 pro Zlínský kraj, in 2008 election as Starostové a nezávislí pro Zlínský kraj
- 2 Lékaři a odborníci za ozdravení kraje
- 3 in 2008 election as part of Koalice nestraníků
- 4 Za Morální Očistu Regionu
- 5 Hnutí odborníků za Zlínský kraj

=== Results ===
Party	2008			2012			Change	
Party	votes	percent	seats	votes	percent	seats	percent	seats
Czech Social Democratic Party	68 452	35.40	18	40 620	21.73	12	-13.67	-6
Christian and Democratic Union – Czechoslovak People's Party	25 824	13.35	6	34 231	18.31	10	+4.96	+4
Communist Party of Bohemia and Moravia	21 626	11.18	5	30 074	16.08	9	+4.90	+4
Mayors and Independents and TOP 09 for Zlín region	19 505	10.08	5	18 863	10.09	5	+0.01	0
Civic Democratic Party	42 460	21.96	11	17 757	9.49	5	-12.47	-6
Party of Civic Rights - Zemanovci	-	-	-	13 488	7.21	4	+7.21	+4
votes total/turnout/seats	193 328	41.13	45	186 923	40.34	45	-0.79	
