= Vít Rakušan =

Czech pedagogue and politician

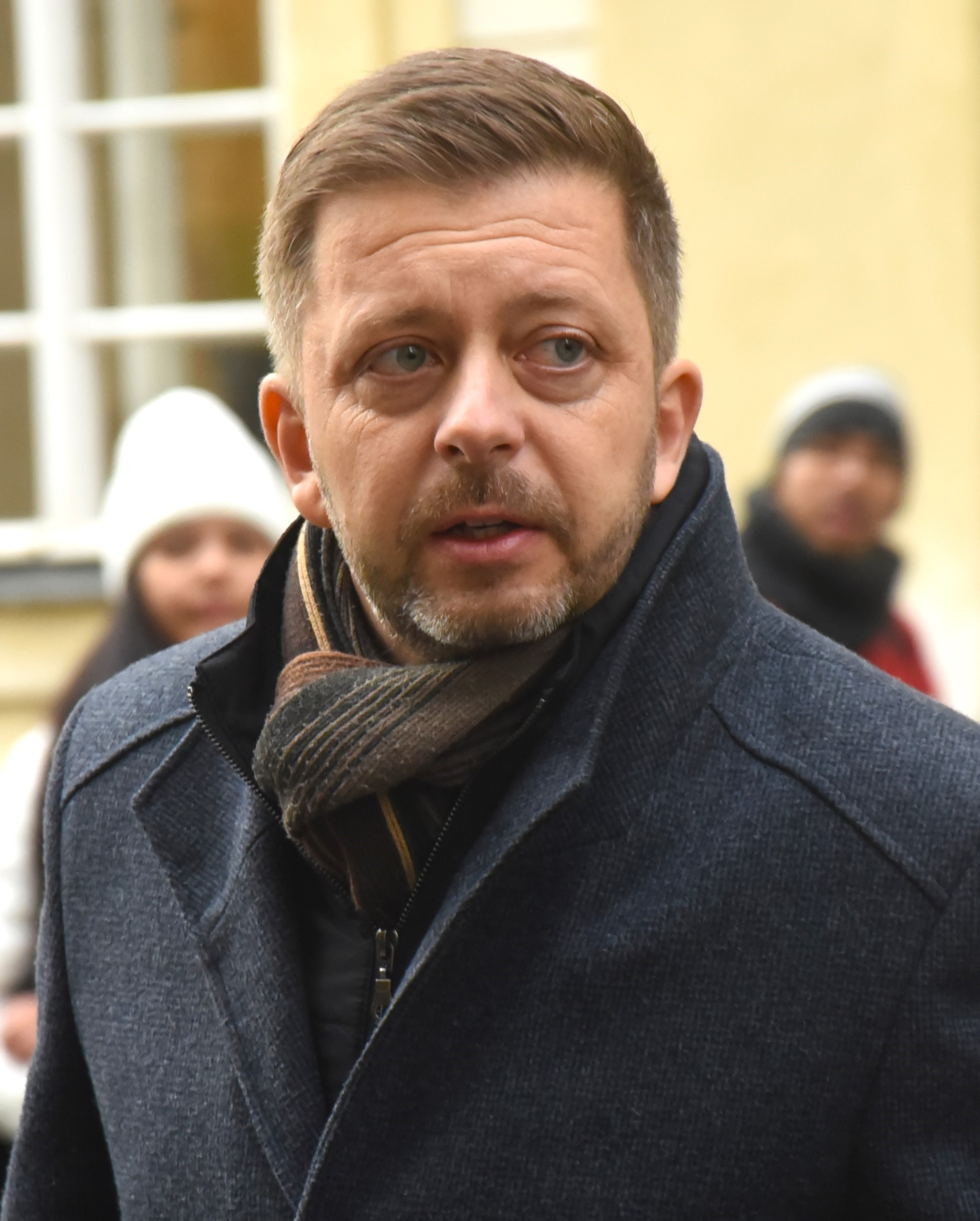
- Rakušan in 2023

First Deputy Prime Minister of the Czech Republic
- In office 17 December 2021 – 15 December 2025
- Prime Minister: Petr Fiala
- Preceded by: Jan Hamáček
- Succeeded by: Karel Havlíček

Minister of the Interior
- In office 17 December 2021 – 15 December 2025
- Prime Minister: Petr Fiala
- Preceded by: Jan Hamáček
- Succeeded by: Lubomír Metnar

Leader of Mayors and Independents
- Incumbent
- Assumed office 13 April 2019
- Preceded by: Petr Gazdík

1st Vice-Chairman of Mayors and Independents
- In office 16 April 2016 – 13 April 2019
- Preceded by: Petr Gazdík
- Succeeded by: Jan Farský

Member of the Chamber of Deputies
- Incumbent
- Assumed office 21 October 2017

Personal details
- Born: 16 June 1978 (age 48) Kolín, Czechoslovakia (now the Czech Republic)
- Party: Mayors and Independents
- Spouse: Marie Rakušanová
- Children: 3
- Education: University of South Bohemia in České Budějovice, Charles University
- Website: www.vitrakusan.cz

Vít Rakušan (born 16 June 1978) is a Czech pedagogue and politician who has served as the leader of the Mayors and Independents (STAN) political party since 2019 and its first vice-chairman from 2016 to 2019. He has been a member of the Chamber of Deputies since October 2017; an elected representative of the Central Bohemia Region since 2012, and was the mayor of the City of Kolín from 2010 to 2019. From 2021 to 2025, he served as First Deputy Prime Minister and Minister of the Interior in the Cabinet of Petr Fiala.

== Early life and education ==
Rakušan ran his own business between 2000 and 2015 in the area of German language teaching. He teaches German language at Jiří Orten Grammar School (Czech: Gymnázium Jiřího Ortena) in Kutná Hora.

== Political career ==
=== Early political career ===
Rakušan has been a member of the STAN political party. He also holds the position of a member of the National Committee and a Vice-Chairman of the Regional Committee of the Central Bohemian Region in the party. At the 8th National Convention of STAN in Průhonice u Prahy in mid April 2016, he was elected the first vice-chairman of the party. He won 137 votes from 144 delegates (i.e. 95%).

=== 2010s elections ===
In the 2010 Czech municipal elections, Rakušan was a non-partisan candidate of the entity Změna pro Kolín (lit. 'Change for Kolín' to be elected as a representative of the City of Kolín, later being mayor of the city.

In the 2012 Czech regional elections, Rakušan was elected as a non-partisan member of STAN as part of the entity "TOP 09 a Starostové pro Středočeský kraj" to the Regional Council of the Central Bohemia Region. He was originally listed at 11th place on the list of candidates but came in second due to preferential votes.

In 2014 municipal elections, Rakušan successfully defended his position as an elected representative of the city, when he once again led the list of candidates as a non-partisan candidate of Změna pro Kolín, which won with 63.95% votes. In November 2014, he was elected mayor of the city for the second time.

In 2016, Rakušan was ranked among the top 100 innovators of Central and Eastern Europe announced by the prestigious English international daily newspaper Financial Times. During elections of the same year, he was the leader of STAN in the Central Bohemia Region and defended his mandate of an elected regional representative. On 18 November, Rakušan was elected statutory representative and deputy mayor for safety and tourism, but was removed from office in October 2017 after the breakup of coalition.

At the 9th National Convention of STAN in Prague on 25 March 2017, Rakušan was the only candidate to defend the position of the 1st vice-chairman of the party, having obtained votes from 133 of 145 delegates (i.e., 92%). In the parliamentary election the same year, he was the leader of the STAN party in the Central Bohemia Region, being elected deputy with 7,334 preferential votes.

Rakušan was the national leader of STAN during the 2018 Czech municipal elections. He defended the record setting results in 2014 with political group Změna pro Kolín in Kolín, winning 62.82% of the votes cast and obtaining even 21 of 27 mandates.

At the 10th National Convention of STAN on 13 April 2019, he was elected as the only candidate for the chairman of the party. He was elected right in the first round by 93% of the votes. He thus replaced Petr Gazdík in the function of chairman, who had decided not to defend the position.

=== 2020s elections ===
Rakušan stood as a STAN candidate in the Central Bohemia Region during the 2020 Czech regional elections. The party won and he defended the position of an elected representative once again. In the total sum of preferential votes, Rakušan received the second highest number from voters: 12,243 votes. He received more than 60,000 first-preference votes, more than any other candidate in the 2021 Czech legislative election.

== Views and attitudes ==
Rakušan stated that the Czech Republic should support Israel but he also criticized the planned Israeli annexation of the Jewish settlements, that Israel has developed on the occupied Jordanian West Bank since 1967, which is territory that the Palestinians count on for their future state of Palestine.

In relation to the removal of the statue of the Russian marshal Ivan Konev in Prague 6 in 2020, Rakušan objected the criticism expressed by the chairman of KSČM Vojtěch Filip in one of the Russian daily papers. It was the removal of the statue that Filip criticized in the daily. According to Rakušan, Filip crossed the line. He also drew attention to the increasing power of Russian propaganda.

In recent years, Rakušan sees a similar problem in the obvious pressure and influence of China, which are also often mentioned in connection with the death of the then President of the Senate Jaroslav Kubera. According to him, China makes use of the Czech Republic not only as a tool of propaganda, but also from the point of view of industrial espionage. Attention to the influence of China and Russia is regularly drawn in the reports of BIS.

Rakušan is a supporter of the idea of a simple, modern state, which should primarily serve its citizens, not hinder them. As part of his role as an elected representative, he tries to help citizens to improve and simplify life within the project Absurdity. In the long term, he also subscribes to the ideas and legacy of former president Václav Havel.

== Personal life ==
Rakušan has been married twice, with Marie Auerová being as his wife since 2015. They have two sons named Matěj and Jonáš, born in 2017 and 2020 respectively. His father is a former senator elected as a member of ČSSD, Jan Rakušan.
