= Mayors and Independents =

Czech political party

Mayors and Independents Starostové a nezávislí
- Abbreviation: STAN
- Leader: Vít Rakušan
- Deputy Leaders: Lukáš Vlček; Jan Farský; Michaela Šebelová; Pavel Čížek; Karel Dvořák
- Chamber of Deputies Leader: Michaela Šebelová
- Senate Leader: Jan Sobotka
- Founder: Petr Gazdík
- Founded: 2004; 22 years ago
- Newspaper: STANoviny
- Think tank: Institute of Modern Politics iSTAR
- Youth wing: Young Mayors and Independents
- Membership (2026): 2,330
- Ideology: Localism; Liberalism (Czech); Pro-Europeanism
- Political position: Centre to centre-right
- National affiliation: Pirates and Mayors (2020–2021)
- European Parliament group: European People's Party Group
- Colours: Pink; Yellow
- Slogan: Staráme se o lidi ('We take care of people')
- Chamber of Deputies: 20 / 200
- Senate: 14 / 81
- European Parliament: 2 / 21
- Regional councils: 93 / 675
- Regional governors: 2 / 13
- Local councils: 3,073 / 62,300

Website
- starostove-nezavisli.cz

Mayors and Independents (Czech: Starostové a nezávislí, STAN) is a liberal political party in the Czech Republic, focused on localism, regionalism and subsidiarity. It holds 20 seats in the Chamber of Deputies, and is the third strongest party by number of seats following the 2025 election. In the Senate, STAN is represented by 19 Senators.

The party grew out of four minor parties, including the Independent Mayors for the Region, and the liberal-conservative SNK European Democrats. Until 2016, the party cooperated in national elections with another liberal-conservative party, TOP 09. STAN contested the 2021 Czech parliamentary election as part of the coalition Pirates and Mayors with the Czech Pirate Party.

== History ==
STAN grew out of the Independent Mayors for the Region (Nezávislí starostové pro kraj; NSK), founded in 2004. In 2009, led by its first leader Petr Gazdík and deputy leader Stanislav Polčák, STAN started co-operating with the liberal-conservative TOP 09 at all levels, with Gazdík leading the TOP 09 and STAN parliamentary group. In the 2010 local elections, the party won 1,243 councillors, making it the sixth-largest party on local councils.

In 2013, the co-operation with TOP 09 ended at local and regional levels, and continued only in the Chamber of Deputies and the Senate. In the 2013 election to the Chamber of Deputies, STAN won five seats on the TOP 09 list: Jan Farský, Stanislav Polčák, Věra Kovářová, František Vácha and acting leader Petr Gazdík.

In March 2014, Martin Půta, governor of the Liberec Region, was unanimously elected leader of STAN, and Gazdík became the first deputy leader with Polčák as the second deputy. Running a joint list for the 2014 European Parliament election, STAN and TOP 09 received 15.95% of the vote and won four seats, one of which was taken by STAN's Stanislav Polčák. In 2016, Martin Půta was succeeded by Petr Gazdík, who led STAN into the regional and Senate elections. In the 2017 election to the Chamber of Deputies, STAN won six seats: Petr Gazdík, Jan Farský, Věra Kovářová, Vít Rakušan, Martin Půta (who was replaced by Petr Pávek) and Jana Krutáková.

In 2019 Vít Rakušan was elected as leader. In 2020 STAN won the Senate elections, taking 11 of the 27 seats contested. The party contested the 2021 Czech parliamentary election as part of the Pirates and Mayors coalition with the Czech Pirate Party. Thanks to preferential voting, STAN took most of the coalition's 37 seats, winning 33 and becoming the third strongest party in the Chamber of Deputies.

== Political positions ==
The party's main focus is the promotion of the principle of subsidiarity. STAN supports localism, decentralisation, reduction of bureaucracy, and anti-corruption measures, and its policy priorities include improving education and investing in science, supporting rural areas, and protecting nature. The party supports the introduction of same-sex marriage in the Czech Republic.

STAN strongly supports the introduction of the euro in the Czech Republic and deeper European integration. Some party members support the idea of a European federation, including former minister Martin Dvořák and the youth organization Young Mayors and Independents.

== Young Mayors and Independents ==
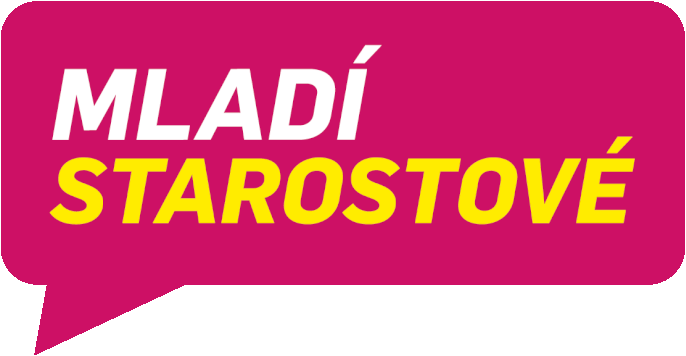
Young Mayors and Independents logo

The party's youth wing, Young Mayors and Independents (Czech: Mladí starostové a nezávislí, mSTAN), was founded in 2015. Its former leader Tomáš Pavelka was the youngest mayor in the Czech Republic in on his election in 2020. mSTAN cooperated with Young Pirates in the campaign ahead of the 2021 Czech legislative election. Zdena Kašparová has been the chair of mSTAN since 2024.

== Election results ==
=== Chamber of Deputies ===
Election	Leader	Vote	%	Seats	±	Position	Status
2010	Petr Gazdík	873,833	16.71	5 / 200	New	▲6th	Coalition
2010	Ran on TOP 09 list, which won 41 seats in total						
2013	Petr Gazdík	596,357	12.00	4 / 200	▼1	▼8th	Opposition
2013	Ran on TOP 09 list, which won 26 seats in total						
2017	Jan Farský	262,157	5.18	6 / 200	▲2	▼9th	Opposition
2021	Vít Rakušan	839,448	15.61	33 / 200	▲27	▲3rd	Coalition
2021	Part of the Pirates and Mayors coalition, which won 37 seats in total						
2025	Vít Rakušan	631,512	11.23	22 / 200	▼11	3rd	Opposition

=== Senate ===
Election	First round			Second round			Seats	Total seats	+/–
Election	Votes	%	Place	Votes	%	Place	Seats	Total seats	+/–
2012	4,460	0.5	25th				0 / 27	0 / 81	New
2014	15,576	1.5	9th	11,099	2.3	9th	2 / 27	2 / 81	▲2
2016	43,234	4.9	7th	25,389	6.0	6th	3 / 27	5 / 81	▲3
2018	76,817	7.0	7th	47,317	11.3	3rd	5 / 27	11 / 81	▲5
2020	122,948	12.3	2nd	104,538	23.1	1st	11 / 27	19 / 81	▲7
2022	75,406	6.8	5th	6,410	1.3	13th	0 / 27	15 / 81	▼4
2024	87,734	11.1	3rd	53,498	13.7	3rd	5 / 27	15 / 81	Steady
2026	219,787	19.04	2nd	143,726	30.37	1st	9 / 27	14 / 81	▼1

=== Presidential ===
==== Indirect elections ====
Election	Candidate	First round			Second round			Third round		
Election	Candidate	Votes	%	Result	Votes	%	Result	Votes	%	Result
2008	Jan Švejnar	128	49.10	Runner-up	141	47.19	Runner-up	111	44.05	Lost

==== Direct elections ====
Election	Candidate	First round			Second round		
Election	Candidate	Votes	%	Result	Votes	%	Result
2013	Karel Schwarzenberg	1,204,195	23.40	Runner-up	2,241,171	45.20	Lost
2018	Jiří Drahoš	1,369,601	26.60	Runner-up	2,701,206	48.63	Lost

=== European Parliament ===
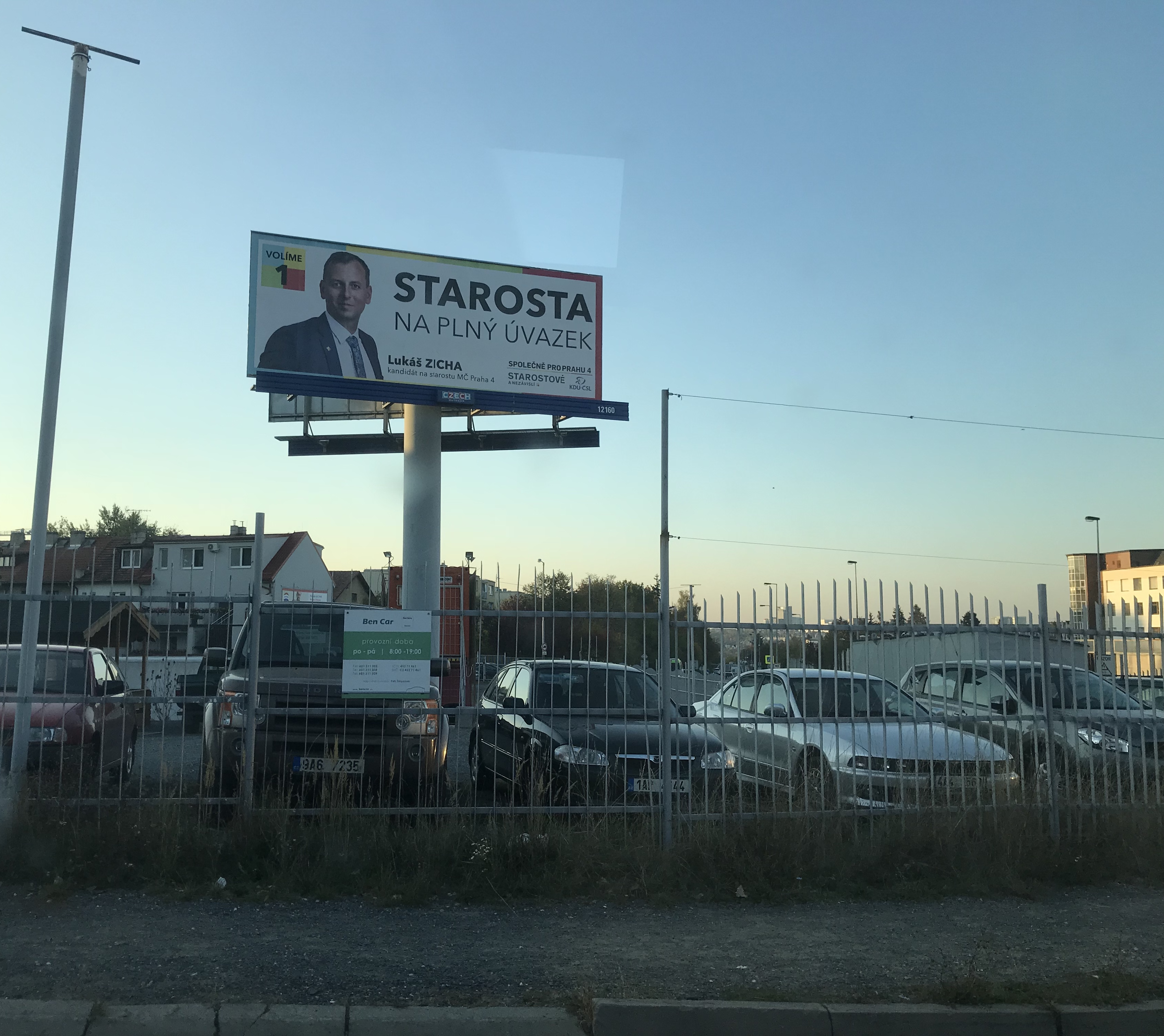
Billboard in Prague

Election	List leader	Votes	%	Seats	+/−	EP Group
2009 (Note: Run in a joint list with Your Option.)	Jaromír Štětina	53,984	2.29 (#8)	0 / 22	New	−
2014 (Note: Run in a joint list with TOP 09.)	Luděk Niedermayer	241,747	15.95 (#2)	1 / 21	▲1	EPP
2019 (Note: Run in a joint list with TOP 09, SZ and LES.)	Jiří Pospíšil	276,220	11.65 (#4)	1 / 21	Steady	EPP
2024 (Note: Run in a joint list with Mayors for Liberec Region.)	Danuše Nerudová	258,431	8.70 (#5)	2 / 21	▲1	EPP

=== Regional councils ===
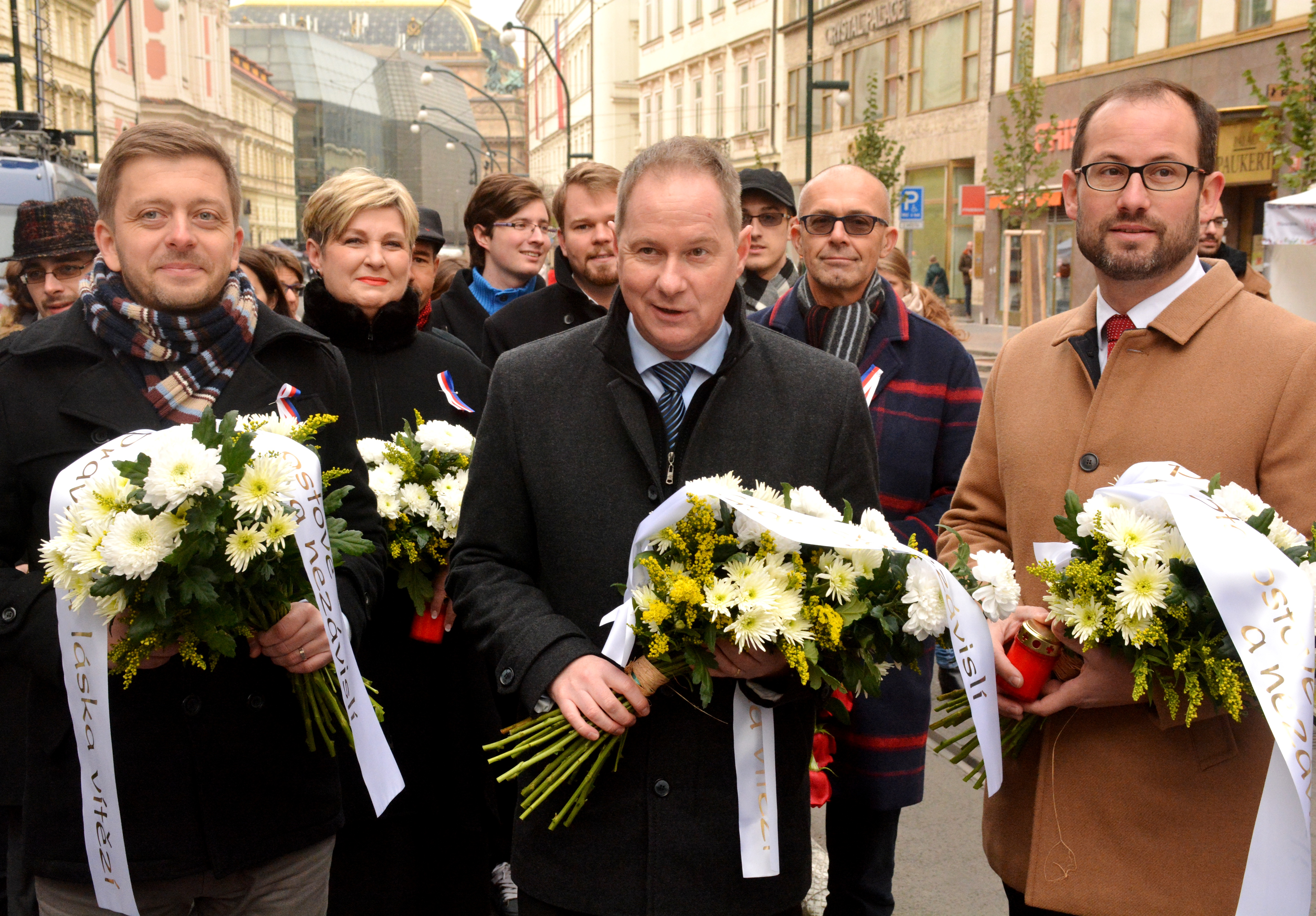
Leading the movement

Election	Vote	%	Seats	+/–	Position
2004	Ran only in coalitions		1 / 675	▲1	▲10th
2008	53,462	1.83	14 / 675	▲13	▲5th
2012	28,763	1.09	38 / 675	▲24	5th
2016	101,696	4.02	56 / 675	▲18	▼6th
2020	167,459	6.04	91 / 675	▲35	▲4th
2024	326,632	13.71	93 / 675	▲2	▲3rd

=== Prague City Assembly ===
Election	Leader	Coalition			Seats	+/–	Position	Status
Election	Leader	Parties	Votes	%	Seats	+/–	Position	Status
2014	Petr Štěpánek	STAN–KDU-ČSL–Zelení	2,323,976	11.2	2 / 65	▲2	▲8th	Coalition
2018	Petr Hlaváček	STAN–TOP 09–KDU-ČSL–LES–SKN ED	4,127,063	16.3	4 / 65	▲2	▲6th	Coalition
2022	Petr Hlaváček	—N/a	1,831,696	7.8	5 / 65	▲1	▲5th	Coalition
2026	Petr Hlaváček	—N/a	5,696,945	23.2	17 / 65	▲12	▲1st	Coalition

== Leaders ==
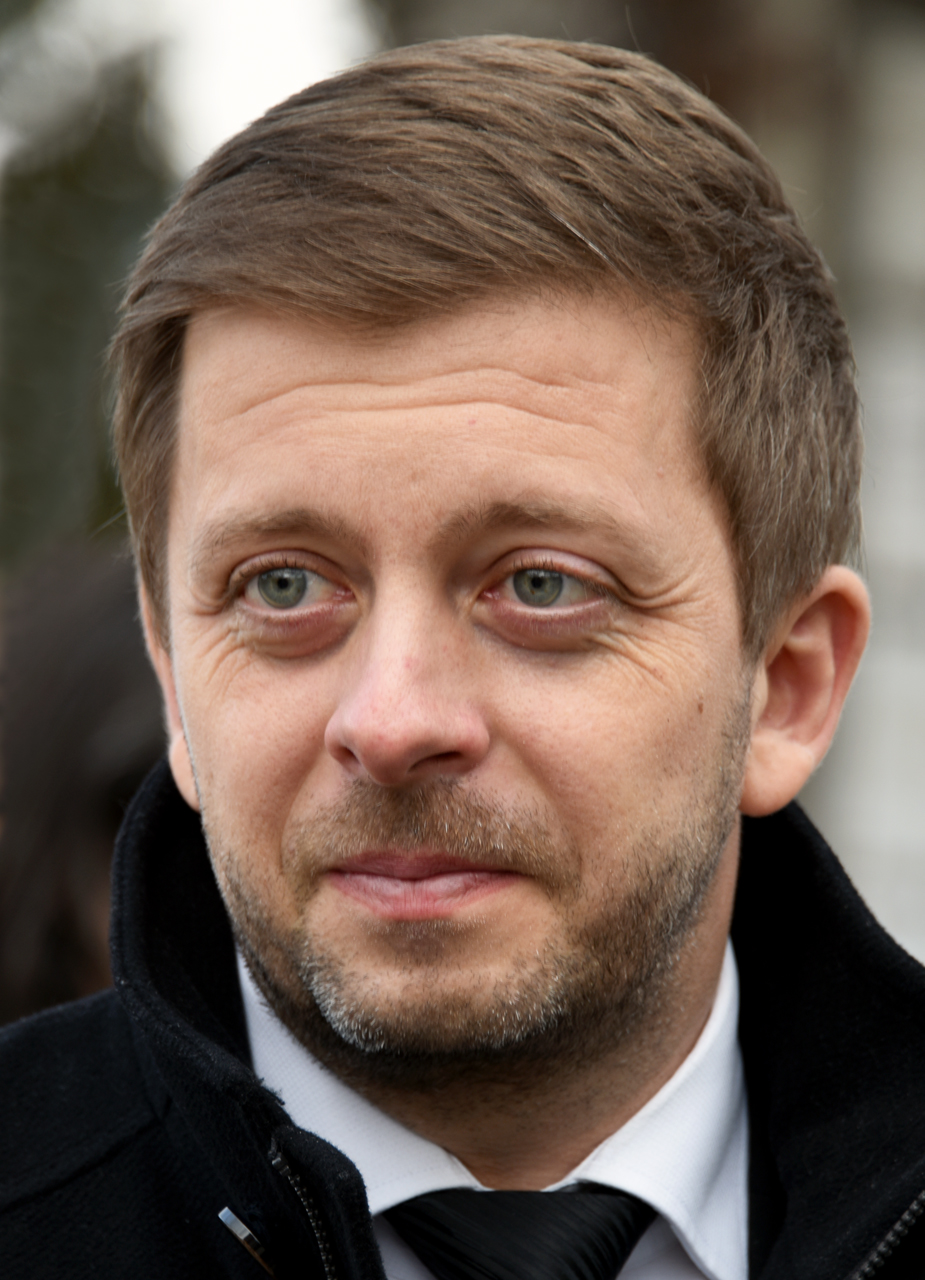
Leader of the party Vít Rakušan

- Josef Zicha (2005–2009)
- Petr Gazdík (2009–2014)
- Martin Půta (2014–2016)
- Petr Gazdík (2016–2019)
- Vít Rakušan (Since 2019)
