= Senate district 59 – Brno-City =

Electoral district in the Czech Republic

59 – Brno
- inline Senate district of the Czech Republic

- The Brno-City district on a map
- Senator: Břetislav Rychlík; TOP 09
- Region: South Moravia
- District: Brno-město
- Last election: 2024
- Next election: 2030

Senate district 59 – Brno-město is an electoral district of the Senate of the Czech Republic, located in part of the Brno-City District. Since 2024, the Senator for the district is Břetislav Rychlík.

== Senators ==
Year	Senator	Nominating party
1996	Richard Salzmann	ODS
2000	Milan Šimonovský	4KOALICE
2006	Richard Svoboda	ODS
2012	Eliška Wagnerová	SZ
2018	Mikuláš Bek	STAN
2024	Břetislav Rychlík	TOP 09

== Election results ==
=== 1996 ===
1996 Czech Senate election in Brno-city
Candidate	Party	1st round		2nd round	
Candidate	Party	Votes	%	Votes	%
Richard Salzmann	ODS	15 628	46,00	18 252	58,32
Jaroslav Mezník	ČSSD	7 768	22,68	13 045	41,68
Pavel Rubina	ODA	4 283	12,61	—	—
Anna Štofanová	KSČM	3 463	10,19	—	—
Zdeněk Pospíchal	SZ	1 378	4,06	—	—
Jiří Horák	NEZ	898	2,64	—	—
Petr Němec	MSLK_96	558	1,64	—	—

=== 2000 ===
2000 Czech Senate election in Brno-city
Candidate	Party	1st round		2nd round	
Candidate	Party	Votes	%	Votes	%
Milan Šimonovský	4KOALICE	8 307	27,49	11 745	65,01
Jarmila Horová	ODS	6 000	19,85	6 174	34,98
Vladimír Vetchý	ČSSD	5 236	17,32	—	—
Ivo Vaněk	Independent	4 884	16,16	—	—
Pavel Březa	KSČM	3 539	11,71	—	—
Karel Rada	NPM	1 255	4,15	—	—
Pavel Fiľo	SŽJ	372	1,23	—	—
Čestmír Hofhanzl	SKS	352	1,16	—	—
Karol Schneider	CAO	273	0,90	—	—

=== 2006 ===
2006 Czech Senate election in Brno-city
Candidate	Party	1st round		2nd round	
Candidate	Party	Votes	%	Votes	%
Richard Svoboda	ODS	12 081	37,74	10 661	59,43
Jiří Václavek	ČSSD	5 821	18,18	7 277	40,56
Mojmír Vlašín	SZ	5 341	16,68	—	—
Daniel Borecký	KSČM	3 004	9,38	—	—
Jan Holík	KDU-ČSL	2 919	9,12	—	—
Rom Kostřica	„21"	2 018	6,30	—	—
Růžena Šalamonová	NEZ/DEM	820	2,56	—	—

=== 2012 ===
2012 Czech Senate election in Brno-city
Candidate	Party	1st round		2nd round	
Candidate	Party	Votes	%	Votes	%
Eliška Wagnerová	SZ	7 396	26,74	10 756	73,75
Stanislava Slavíková	ČSSD	4 788	17,31	3 827	26,24
Daniel Rychnovský	KDU-ČSL	4 018	14,52	—	—
Petr Kovač	SN	2 342	8,46	—	—
Karel Rais	TOP 09, STAN	2 202	7,96	—	—
Richard Svoboda	ODS	2 116	7,65	—	—
Martin Říha	KSČM	2 115	7,64	—	—
Rostislav Vyzula	ANO 2011	1 677	6,06	—	—
Patrik Doležal	Pirates	855	3,09	—	—
Viliam Záthurecký	NÁR.SOC.	145	0,52	—	—

=== 2018 ===
2018 Czech Senate election in Brno-city
Candidate	Party	1st round		2nd round	
Candidate	Party	Votes	%	Votes	%
Mikuláš Bek	STAN, Zelení, ODS, TOP 09	11 241	38,17	8 815	72,40
Jaromír Ostrý	ANO 2011	5 508	18,70	3 359	27,59
Jan Špilar	KDU-ČSL	5 222	17,73	—	—
Karel Schmeidler	SPD	2 191	7,44	—	—
Oldřich Duchoň	KSČM	1 430	4,85	—	—
Pavel Kosorin	ČSSD	1 329	4,51	—	—
Pavel Trčala	MZH	960	3,26	—	—
Stanislav Balík	APAČI 2017	794	2,69	—	—
Lucie Zajícová	Rozumní	390	1,32	—	—
Petr Kováč	RDS	216	0,73	—	—
Emil Adamec	Monarchiste.cz	164	0,55	—	—

=== 2024 ===
2024 Czech Senate election in Brno-city
Candidate	Party	1st round		2nd round	
Candidate	Party	Votes	%	Votes	%
Břetislav Rychlík	TOP 09, Zelení, ODS, Pirates	6 994	28,77	8 754	67,80
Karin Podivinská	SOCDEM, ANO 2011	5 753	23,66	4 157	32,19
Marie Jílková	KDU-ČSL	4 639	19,08	—	—
Petr Kovač	SOM	2 344	9,64	—	—
Tomáš Skřička	SPD, Tricolour	2 334	9,60	—	—
Libor Zabloudil	STAN	1 870	7,69	—	—
Michal Janda	Svobodní	372	1,53	—	—
