= History of Czech civilian firearms possession =

Czech firearms possession

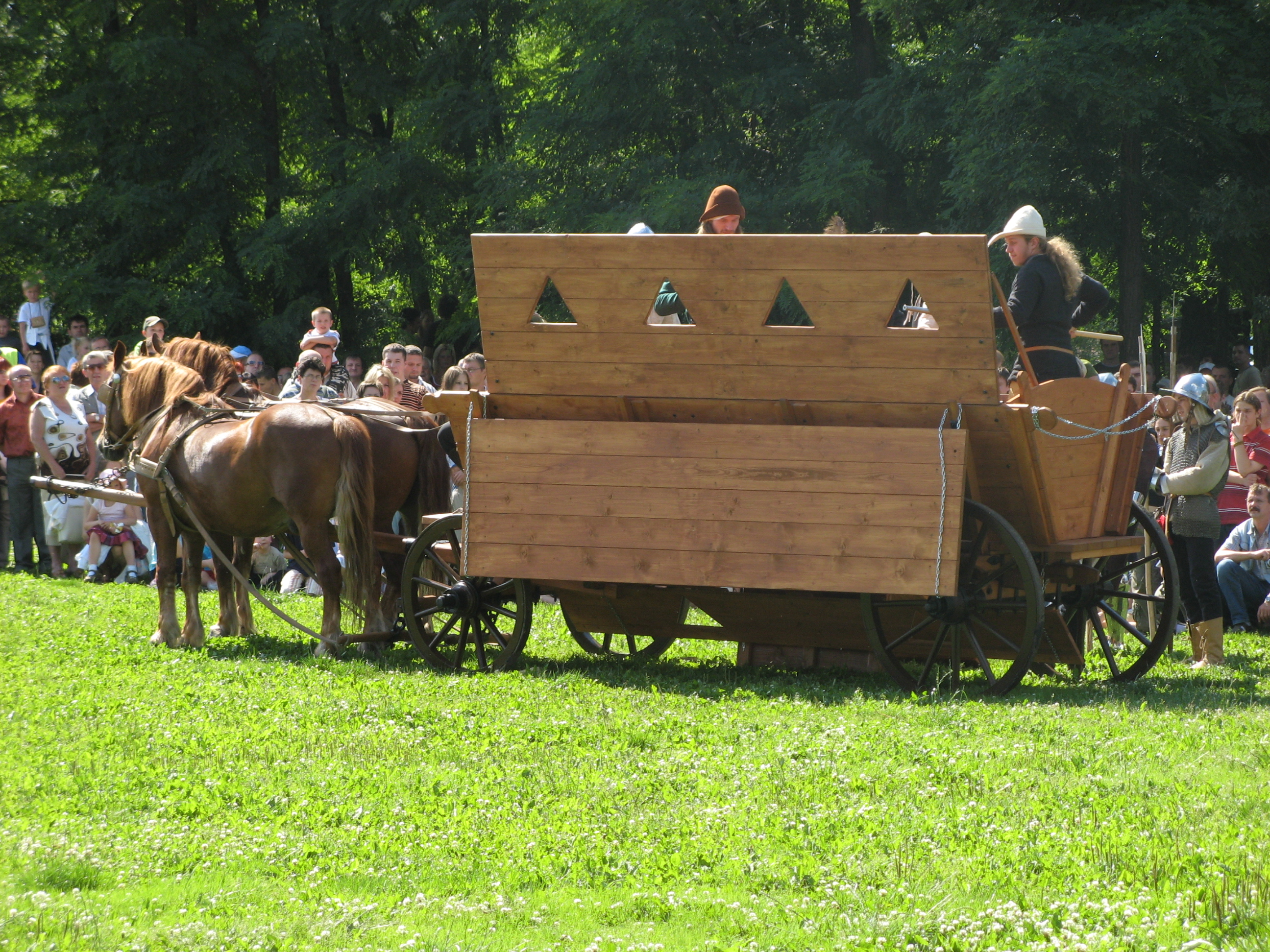
A replica of 1420s Hussite war wagon with embrasures for firearms.

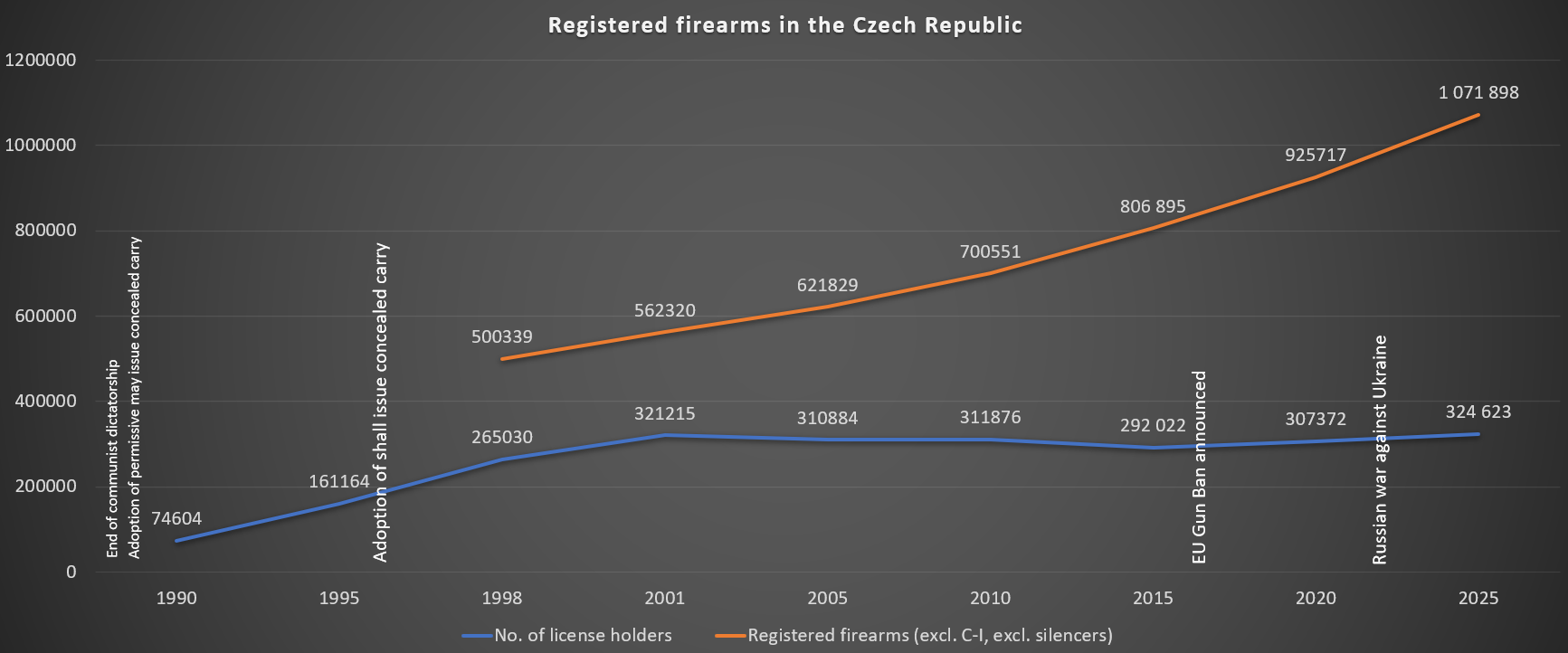
Total number of gun license holders and registered firearms in the Czech Republic since the fall of communism

The history of Czech civilian firearms possession extends over 600 years back when the Czech lands became the center of firearms development, both as regards their technical aspects as well as tactical use.

In 1419, the proto-Protestant Hussite revolt against Catholic church and Sigismund, Holy Roman Emperor started. The ensuing Hussite wars over religious freedom and political independence represented a clash between professional Crusader armies from all around Europe, relying mostly on standard medieval tactics and cold weapons, and primarily commoners' militia-based Czech forces which relied on the use of firearms. First serving as auxiliary weapons, firearms gradually became indispensable for the Czech militia.

The year 1421 marks a symbolical beginning of the Czech civilian firearms possession due to two developments: enactment of formal duty of all inhabitants to obey call to arms by provisional Government in order to defend the country and first battle in which Hussite Taborite militia employed firearms as the main weapons of attack.

A universal right to keep arms was affirmed in the 1517 Wenceslaus Agreement. In 1524 the Enactment on Firearms was passed, establishing rules and permits for carrying of firearms. Firearms legislation remained permissive until the 1939-1945 German occupation. The 1948-1989 period of Communist dictatorship marked another period of severe gun restrictions.

Permissive legislation returned in the 1990s. Citizens’ ability to be armed has been considered an important aspect of liberty. Today, the vast majority of Czech gun owners possess their firearms for protection, with hunting and sport shooting being less common. 250,342 out of 307,372 legal gun owners possess licenses for the reason of protection of life, health and property (31 Dec 2020), which allows them to carry concealed firearms anywhere in the country.

The "right to acquire, keep and bear firearms" is explicitly recognized in the first Article of the Firearms Act. On a constitutional level, the Charter of Fundamental Rights and Freedoms includes the "right to defend one’s own life or the life of another person also with arms".

== Historical development ==
=== Origins of civilian firearms possession ===
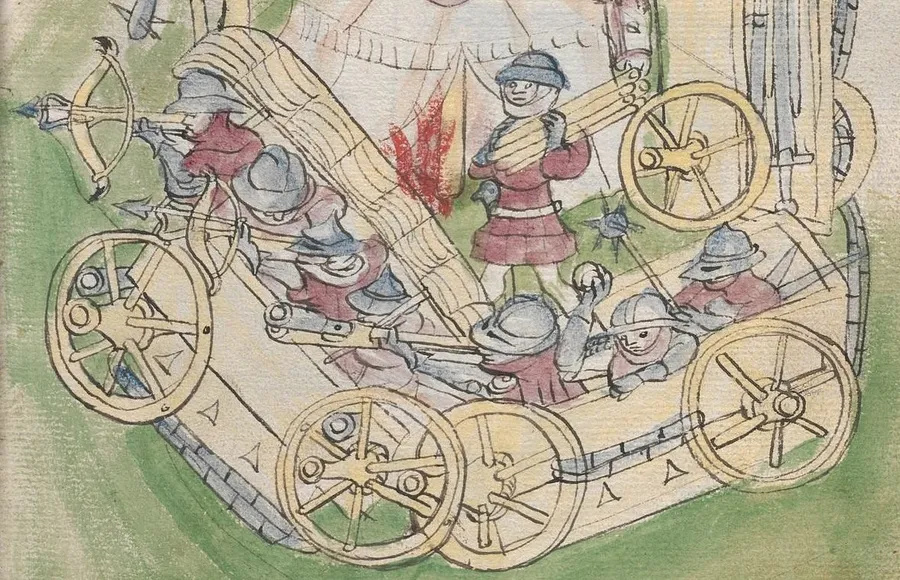
During battle, war wagons were linked together by chains while horses were being used by cavalry riders. Hussite militiamen and women were placed on top and in between the wagons.

The late 14th and early 15th century saw a gradual increase in the use of firearms in siege operations, both by defenders and attackers. The weight, lack of accuracy and cumbersome use of early types limited their employment to static operations and prevented wider use in open battlefield or by civilian individuals. Nevertheless, lack of guild monopolies and low training requirements lead to their relatively low price. This, together with high effectiveness against armour, led to their popularity for castle and town defenses.

When the Hussite revolt started in 1419, the Hussite militias heavily depended on converted farm equipment and weapons looted from castle and town armories, including early firearms. Hussite militia consisted mostly of commoners without prior military experience and included both men and women. Use of crossbows and firearms became crucial as those weapons did not require extensive training, nor did their effectiveness rely on the operator's physical strength.

Firearms were first used in the field as a provisional last resort together with the wagon fort. Significantly outnumbered Hussite militia led by Jan Žižka repulsed surprise assaults by heavy cavalry during Battle of Nekmíř in December 1419 and Battle of Sudoměř in March 1420. In these battles, Žižka employed transport carriages as a wagon fort to stop the enemy's cavalry charge. The main weight of fighting rested on militiamen armed with cold weapons, however firearms shooting from behind the safety of the wagon fort proved to be very effective. Following this experience, Žižka ordered the mass manufacturing of war wagons according to a universal template, as well as manufacturing of new types of firearms, that would be more suitable for use in the open battlefield.

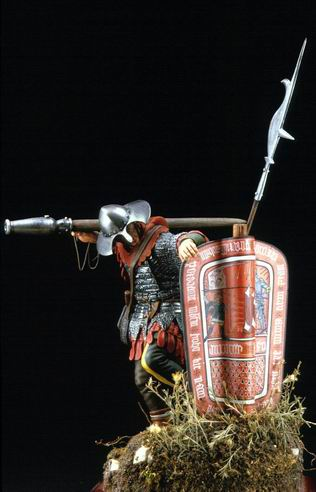
A model of a Hussite warrior behind a Pavise shield, carrying a píšťala on his arm

Throughout 1420 and most of 1421 the Hussite tactical use of the wagon fort and firearms was defensive. The wagon wall was stationary and firearms were used to break the initial charge of the enemy. After this, firearms played an auxiliary role, supporting a mainly cold weapons-based defense at the level of the wagon wall. Counterattacks were carried out by cold weapons-armed infantry and cavalry charges outside of the wagon fort.

The first dynamic use of war wagons and firearms took place during the Hussite breakthrough of Catholic encirclement at Vladař Hill in November 1421 Žlutice Battle. The wagons and firearms were used on the move, at this point still only defensively. Žižka avoided the main camp of the enemy and employed the moving wagon fort in order to cover his retreating troops.

=== Firearms becoming primary weapons ===
The first true engagement where firearms played primary role happened a month later during the Battle of Kutná Hora. Žižka positioned his severely outnumbered forces between the town of Kutná Hora that pledged allegiance to the Hussite cause and the main camp of the enemy, leaving supplies in the well defended town. However, as the Crusaders conducted unsuccessful cavalry charge against the Hussite forces on 21 December, an uprising of ethnic minority German townsmen handed the town into Catholic control. This left the Hussite wagon fort squeezed between the fortified town and the main enemy camp, which consisted of the best professional warriors from 30 countries that the Crusader force could assemble.

Late in night between 21 and 22 December 1421, Žižka ordered a break out charge directly through the enemy's main camp. Czech Hussite militia conducted the attack against the multinational professional army by gradually moving the wagon wall. Instead of usual infantry raids beyond the wagons, the attack relied mainly on use of ranged weapons from the moving war wagons. Nighttime use of firearms proved extremely effective not only practically but also psychologically.

1421 marked not only a change in the importance of firearms from auxiliary to primary weapons of Hussite militia, but also the establishment by the Čáslav diet of a formal legal duty of all inhabitants to obey the call to arms of elected provisional Government. For the first time in medieval European history, this was not put in place in order to fulfill duties to a feudal lord or to the church, but in order to participate in the defense of the country.

Firearms design underwent fast development during the hussite wars and their civilian possession became a matter of course throughout the war as well as after its end in 1434. The word used for one type of hand held firearm used by the Hussites, Czech: píšťala, later found its way through German and French into English as the term pistol. Name of a cannon used by the Hussites, the Czech: houfnice, gave rise to the English term, "howitzer" (houf meaning crowd for its intended use of shooting stone and iron shots against massed enemy forces). Other types of firearms commonly used by the Hussites included hákovnice, an infantry weapon heavier than píšťala, and yet heavier tarasnice (fauconneau). As regards artillery, apart from houfnice Hussites employed bombarda (mortar) and dělo (cannon).

=== 16th century legislation and statutory recognition of right to be armed ===
The right to keep arms was formally recognized through the 1517 St. Wenceslaus Agreement. The agreement was signed between the Czech nobility and burghers after lengthy disputes over the extent of each other's privileges, as both began to fear possible widespread farmer and commoners uprising. While most of the agreement dealt with different issues, it stated that "all people of all standing have the right to keep firearms at home" for purpose of protection in case of war. At the same time, it set a universal ban on carrying of firearms. This, in effect, made conventions of armed farmers and commoners illegal while preserving semblance of legal equality as the ban affected also the nobles and burghers.

General ban on carrying was lifted mere several years later. In 1524 a comprehensive "Enactment on Firearms" (zřízení o ručnicích) was adopted. This lengthy act also focused on ban on carrying of firearms and set details for its enforcement and penalties. While almost entirely setting details of the carry ban, in its closing paragraph the act set a process of issuing carry permits. As permits could be granted either by nobility or by town officials, this put nobles and burghers in clear advantage over the farmer and commoner gun owners.

The 1524 Enactment on Firearms also explicitly stated the right of the nobles and burghers to keep firearms at home for personal protection. While not stating such right explicitly for the rest of the inhabitants, the fact that the enactment sets details of universal carry ban (unless a person has a firearm carry permit) with details of enforcement and penalties aimed at nobles, burgers and rest of the people respectively, makes it clear that they continued to have the right to keep firearms at their homes in line with the 1517 St. Wenceslaus Agreement.

=== 18th and 19th century firearm laws ===
Gun control laws enacted during the early 18th century dealt with illegal use of firearms for poaching. At the time, hunting was an exclusive noble privilege with little to no legal option for participation of common folk. Despite tough sentences of 12 years of hard labor or death introduced by a 1727 enactment, poaching with use of firearms remained widespread to the point that a 1732 Royal Gamekeeping Rules noted that gamekeepers were in constant danger of being shot by poachers.

A 1754 enactment introduced up to one-year imprisonment for carrying of daggers and pocket pistols ("tercerols") as well as tough sentencing for cases of attacking or resisting law enforcement with use of these weapons. Mere brandishing of a weapon against a state official was to be punished by life imprisonment. Wounding a state official would be punished by decapitation, killing of state official by cutting of hand followed by decapitation. Another 1754 enactment limited possibility of shooting within limits of certain cities to licensed shooting ranges, showing early development of sport shooting in the country.

A 1789 decree on hunting also included firearms related measures. Any person merely passing through someone's hunting grounds was obliged to either strip trigger off or wrap their firearm in cloth under penalty of confiscation as well as complete ban on firearms possession. Other enactments limited use of firearms in cities "close to buildings" and on state roads (especially shooting to air during religious celebrations), citing fire hazard as a main concern. In general, however, people were free to possess and carry firearms as they wished, with another 1797 enactment specifying that loaded firearms at home must be kept in a way preventing their use by children.

Gun control enactments adopted in the following three decades focused on banning of insidious weapons such as daggers or rifles hidden in walking sticks. Despite having been already banned under the 1727 law, foreword to 1820 enactment lamented their widespread presence among population both within cities as well as in the countryside.

=== Imperial Regulation No. 223 ===
Following power reconciliation after failed 1848 revolution, emperor Franz Joseph I enacted the Imperial Regulation No. 223 in 1852. According to the regulation, citizens had the right to possess firearms in a number "needed for personal use"; possession of unusually high number of firearms required a special permit. Pistols shorter than 18 centimeters (entire length) were banned altogether as well as rifles disguised as walking sticks. Firearms and ammunition manufacturing was subject to licence acquisition.

The law also introduced firearm carry permits. A carry permit was available to person with clean criminal record subject to paying a fee. It needed to be renewed after three years. Certain civilians did not need a permit: hunters, shooting range members, those wearing traditional clothing that had firearm as customary accessory. During emergency state, carrying of firearms could have been provisionally prohibited.

Another regulation of 1857 explicitly banned private ownership of artillery, while 1898 regulation lifted the ban on small pistols (shorter than 18 cm).

=== Independent Czechoslovakia ===
After the establishment of independent Czechoslovakia in 1918, the country kept the gun law of 1852 (see above), i.e. the citizens had the right to possess firearms and needed to obtain a permit in order to be able to carry them. Possession and carrying of concealed pistols became a commonplace in the country.

After Adolf Hitler's rise to power in Germany in 1933, local ethnic German party established its own armed "security force." In 1938, Hitler brought his demand for succession of part of Czechoslovak borderland that was inhabited mostly by ethnic Germans. The party's security force was transformed into a paramilitary organization called "Sudetendeutsches Freikorps" which started conducting terror operations against Czechoslovak state, Jews and ethnic Czechs. Especially snipers using scoped hunting rifles became particular concern. This led to adoption of Act No. 81/1938, on Firearms and Ammunition, which for the first time introduced licensing system not only for carrying of firearms, but also for firearms possession. Ministry of Interior was supposed to enact a regulation that would set rules for obtaining the licenses, however, this never happened. Freikorps was receiving illegal shipments of firearms from Germany, making the envisioned licensing scheme useless. Thus, despite the new law, the rules of 1852 still remained in force.

=== Nazi gun ban ===
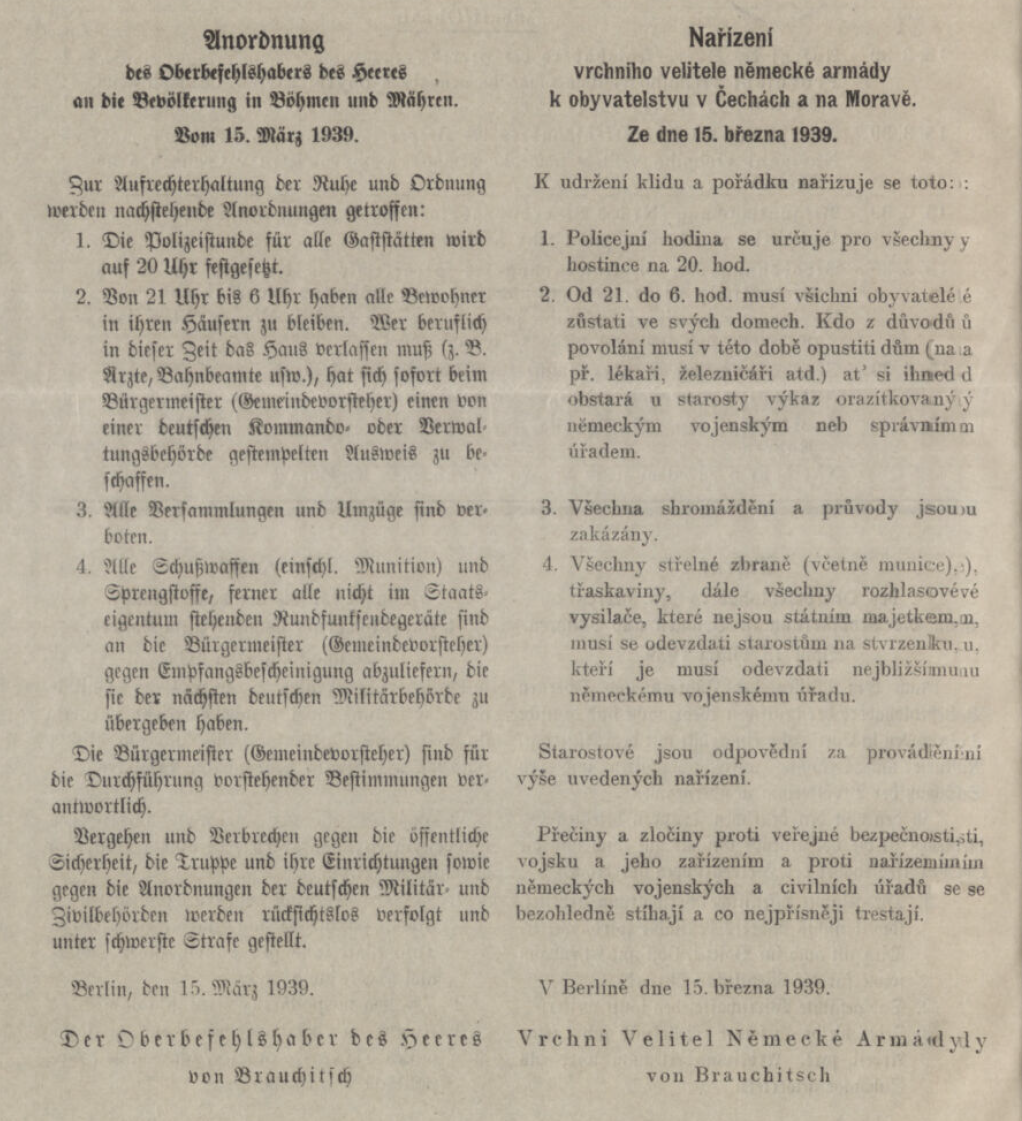
Order of the Supreme Commander of the German Army issuing curfew, banning protests and ordering surrender of firearms.

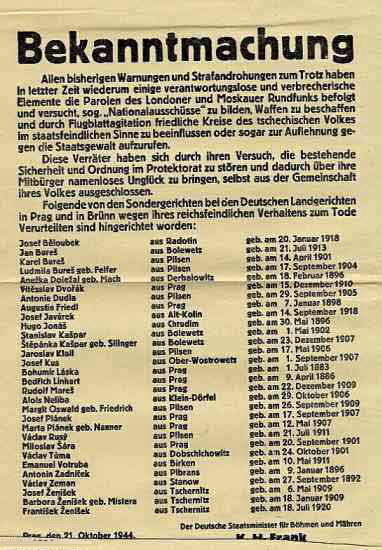
Listing of Czechs executed for distributing anti-Nazi propaganda, forming organizations, and possessing firearms on 21 October 1944.

The very first act of law of the German occupation authorities banned firearms.

Germany, Poland and Hungary seized Czech borderland following the Munich Agreement with UK, France and Italy, in October 1938, immediately putting into force their own restrictive gun laws within the occupied territory.

On 15 March 1939, Germany invaded the remainder of the Czech Lands. On the very first day, Chief Commander of German forces ordered surrender of all "firearms (including ammunition), explosives, and also all radio transmitters that are not state property". In August 1939, this order was replaced by Regulation of Reich Protector No. 20/39. The regulation again ordered the surrender of all firearms and introduced personal responsibility of land plot owners for all firearms that would be found within their property. Reich and Protectorate officials (including police) and SS Members were exempt from the gun ban. Licensed hunters could own up to 5 hunting guns and up to 50 pieces of ammunition. Long rimfire rifles, sport pistols up to 6 mm calibre, air rifles and museum guns were allowed, however they needed to be registered. Simple failure to surrender a firearm carried up to 5 years imprisonment, while hiding of cache of firearms carried the death penalty. Offenders were tried in front of German courts.

Another Regulation of October 1939 ordered surrender of all books on firearms and explosives, as well as all air rifles "that look like military rifles", which was obviously aimed at vz.35 training air rifle that had appearance of vz.24 Czechoslovak main battle rifle.

From May 1940 onwards, illegal possession of a firearm was punishable by death.

=== Communist gun ban ===
Article 4. Permits to possess and carry short firearms may only be issued to persons whose work corresponds to the following nomenclature: members of the government and their deputies, members of the National Assembly and the Slovak National Council, leading officials and employees of the Communist Party of Czechoslovakia, chairpersons and secretaries of national committees, chairpersons and secretaries of National Front bodies, members of the People's Militia on the recommendation of the relevant commanders, prosecutors and judges, directors and managers of particularly important enterprises and facilities, institutes and institutions, and chairpersons of agricultural cooperatives, members of the Auxiliary Guard of the Public Security Corps and assistants to the Border Guard, following an individual decision by the head of the Public Security Corps department. These persons are not subject to screening prior to the issuance of a permit.

Article 5. Permits to possess and carry hunting firearms shall only be issued to vetted and reliable persons devoted to the socialist system.

— Directive on firearms and ammunition NMV No. 34/1962 Coll.

The 1852 Imperial Regulation became again effective following the defeat of Germany in May 1945 and remained in force until 1950.

In 1948, Communists conducted a successful coup in Czechoslovakia and started drafting a number of laws that would secure their grip on power, including the Firearms Act No. 162/1949 that became effective in February 1950. The new law introduced licensing for both possession and carrying. License to possess could be obtained from the District National (communist) Committee in case that "there is no concern of possible misuse". The same applied for license to carry, for which there was also a specific reason needed. Since 1961, the authority to issue license was given to local police chiefs, subject to the same requirements. Given that state apparatus constantly feared counterrevolution, only those deemed loyal to the party had any chance of getting a license.

Ministry of Interior issued in June 1962 a secret guidance no. 34/1962 which specified conditions under which the police chiefs may have issued a license in accordance with the 1949 enactment. License to possess and carry short firearms may have been issued to named categories of persons (members of government, deputies, party functionaries, communist people's militia members, procurators, judges, etc.). Permit to possess and carry a long hunting rifle may have been issued only to "certified and reliable persons devoted to the socialist system". Referencing the secret guidance while issuing or denying the license was strictly forbidden.

A new Firearms Act was adopted in 1983 as No. 147/1983. License remained may issue subject to consideration whether "public interest" does not prevent firearms possession by the given person. Apart from other formalities, the applicant needed to present also a declaration from their employer. Licenses were now available for sport shooting purposes, whereby the applicant needed to present recommendation of a local sport shooting society (which was run by the party). For the first time, the applicant also needed to be cleared by his general practitioner. Licenses were issued for a period of 3 years subject to renewal. Similarly as before, the enactment was accompanied by secret guidance of the Ministry of Interior No. 5/1984. The guidance again limited access to firearms to selected classes, mainly Communist Party members. Newly, sport shooters that achieved required performance bracket could also obtain license. Possession of hunting shotguns was less restrictive.

== Modern era ==
=== 1990–1995 ===
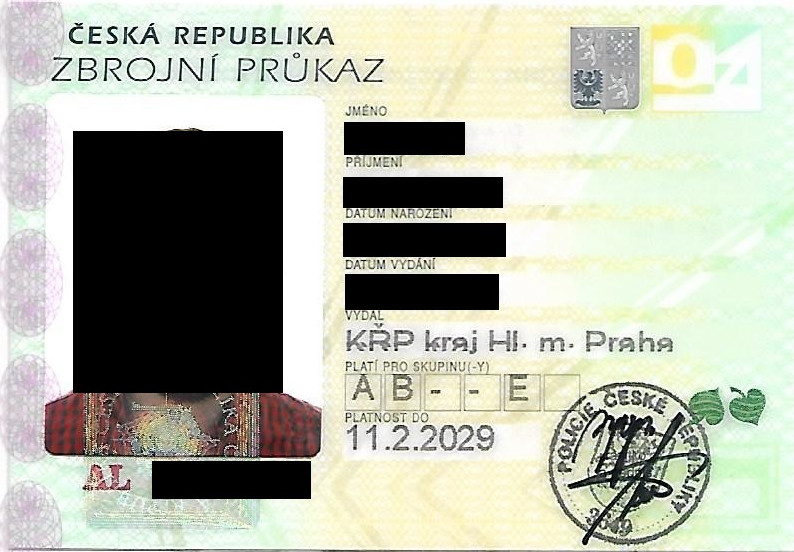
Czech gun license issued in 2018. Note the letters A-B-E, i.e. license was issued for purposes of firearms collection, sport shooting and protection (concealed carry). A separate "registration card" of similar size was then issued for each firearm.

Following the Velvet Revolution, an amendment act No. 49/1990 Coll. was adopted. Under the new law, any person older than 18, with clean criminal record, physically and mentally sound that did not pose threat of misuse of the firearm could have license issued. License may have been issued for purpose of hunting, sport shooting, exercise of profession and in special cases also for protection (concealed carry). Newly, denial of license could be challenged in court.

Even though the law remained may issue, practice of issuing licenses became permissive due to abolishment of communist secret police directive that previously included detailed gun restriction rules.

=== 1995–2002 ===
A general overhaul of firearms legislation took place through act No. 288/1995 Coll.

The new legislation completely left the may issue system previously introduced during communist rule. Gun licenses became shall issue, including for purposes of concealed carry for protection.

=== 2003 - 2025 ===
The right to acquire, keep and bear firearm is guaranteed under conditions set by this law.

— Article 1 Subsection 1 of the Czech Firearms Act

Cornerstones of the Czech gun law remained the same: precisely defined requirements that an applicant must meet in order to be granted a license. Once a person obtained the necessary license, the law was relatively permissive as regards both the type of firearms that become legally accessible, as well as possibility of their concealed carry for personal protection. At the same time, the issuing authority (police) firearm owners' database was connected to information needed for a background check and red flags any incidents that may lead to loss of license requirements. Similarly, health clearance by the general practitioner was needed for periodical renewal of license (every ten years).

Under Act No. 119/2002 Coll. every citizen that met the act's conditions had the right to have firearms license issued and could then obtain a firearm. Holders of D (exercise of profession) and E (self-defense) licenses, which are also shall-issue, could carry up to two concealed firearms for protection.

License type	Minimum age	Ammunition restriction	Note	No. (31 Dec 2023)
A – Collecting	21	3 pcs or 1 smallest production package of the same type, caliber & brand	The only license type under which an A-category firearm may be acquired (subject to may-issue exemption). In case of A-category firearm possession, the license holder must allow access for inspection of its safe storage to police officers.	114,592
B – Sport	18; 15 for members of a shooting club	None		174,528
C – Hunting	18; 16 for pupils at schools with hunting curriculum	None		120,320
D – Exercise of profession	21; 18 for pupils at schools conducting education on firearms or ammunition manufacturing	Only ammunition for the firearm in possession (no restriction on quantity).	Cannot own any firearms (unless holder also of another type of license), only possess & carry concealed firearms owned by the employer (any category). Open carry for members of Municipal Police, Czech National Bank's security while in duty	69,625
E – Protection of life, health and property	21	Only ammunition for the firearm owned (no restriction on quantity).	Concealed carry (up to 2 guns ready for immediate use)	260,277

Firearms Act
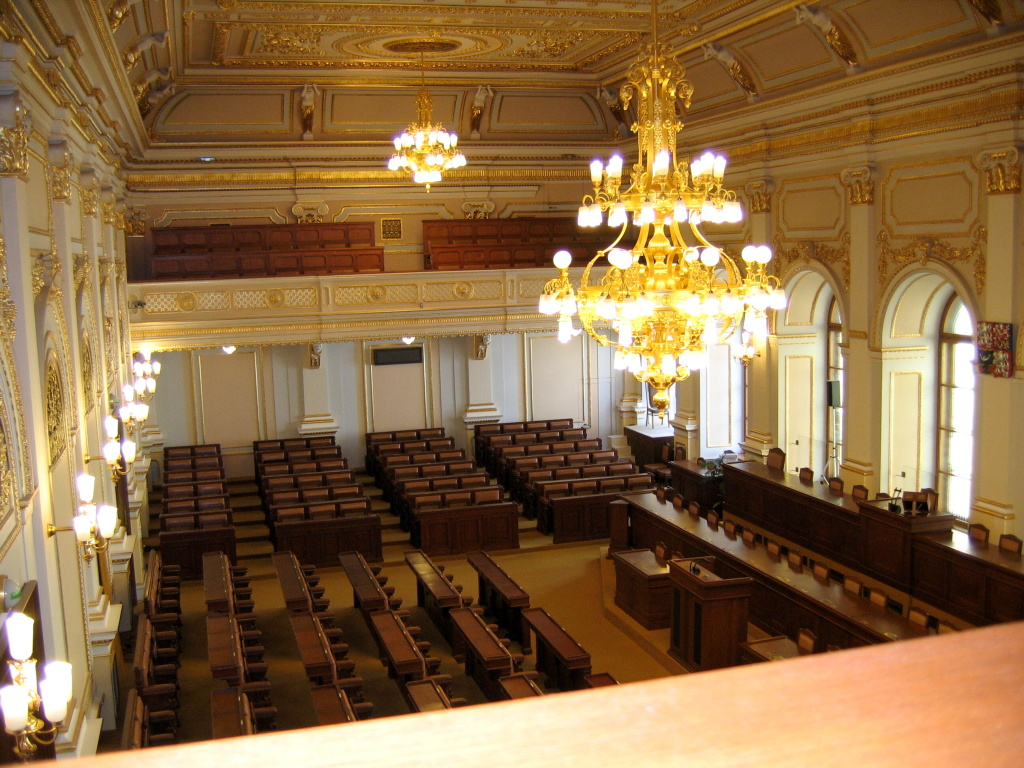

Parliament of the Czech Republic
- Long title: Act on Firearms and Ammunition
- Citation: No. 119/2002 Coll.
- Passed by: Chamber of Deputies
- Passed: 6 February 2002
- Passed by: Senate
- Passed: 13 March 2002
- Signed by: President Václav Havel
- Signed: 20 March 2002
- Commenced: 1 January 2003

Legislative history

Initiating chamber: Chamber of Deputies
- Bill citation: Sněmovní tisk č. 1071 (3rd Legislature)
- Introduced by: Zeman Government; Represented by Stanislav Gross, Minister of the Interior
- Rapporteur: Petr Koháček
- Introduced: 27 September 2001
- Distributed to members: 3 October 2001
- Committee responsible: Defense and Security Committee
- First reading: 25 October 2001
- Second reading: 29 January 2002–31 January 2002
- Third reading: 6 February 2002

Revising chamber: Senate
- Received from the Chamber of Deputies: 18 February 2002
- Rapporteur: Jaroslav Horák
- Committee responsible: Foreign Affairs, Defence and Security Committee
- Passed: 13 March 2002

Repealed by
- No. 90/2024 Coll. (see below)

Related legislation
- Regulation of Ministry of Interior No. 221/2017 Coll., on Execution of Certain Sections of Firearms and Ammunition Act (Firearms Regulation)
- Status: Repealed

==== Types of licenses ====
There were five types of gun license; however, these should not be mistaken with the categories for guns:

- A – Firearm collection
- B – Sport shooting
- C – Hunting
- D – Exercise of a profession
- E – Self-defense

==== Obtaining a license ====
An applicant applied for a gun license at a designated local office of the National police. If the conditions of age, qualification, health clearance, criminal integrity and personal reliability were met and a fee of 700 CZK (US$ 32.29) per type was paid, the license shall be issued in thirty days. The license must have been renewed every ten years (no need to undergo qualification exam if the application was filed at least two months before termination of the previous license; health clearance still necessary).

===== Age =====
To obtain a B or C type license, the applicant must have been at least 18 years old. Under special circumstances, the applicant needed only be 15 if a member of a sporting club, or 16 if taught hunting in schools with such a curriculum. To obtain an A, D or E type license, the applicant must have been be 21.

===== Qualification =====
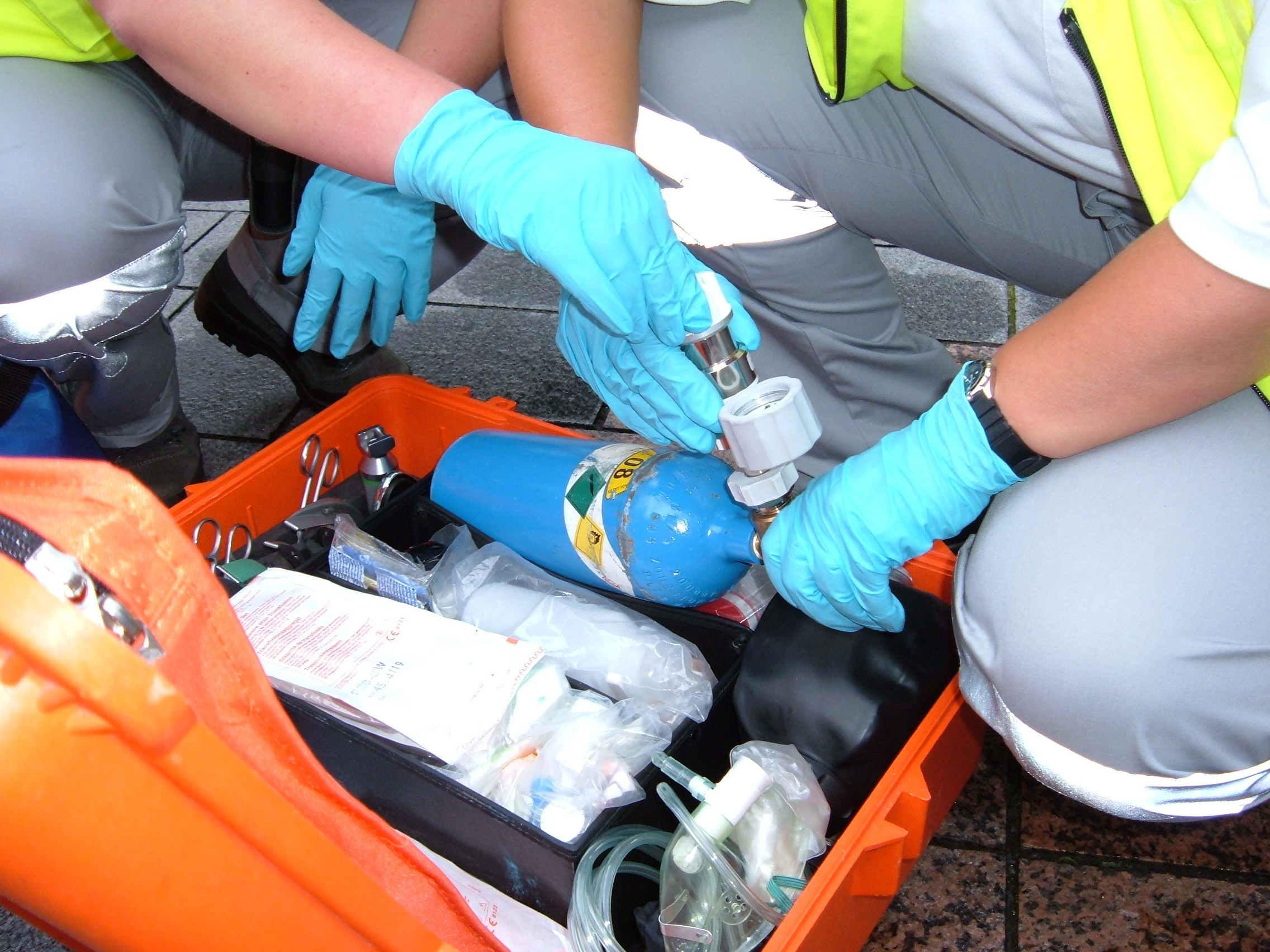
Apart from gun legislation, the theoretical part of the exam focuses also on first aid.

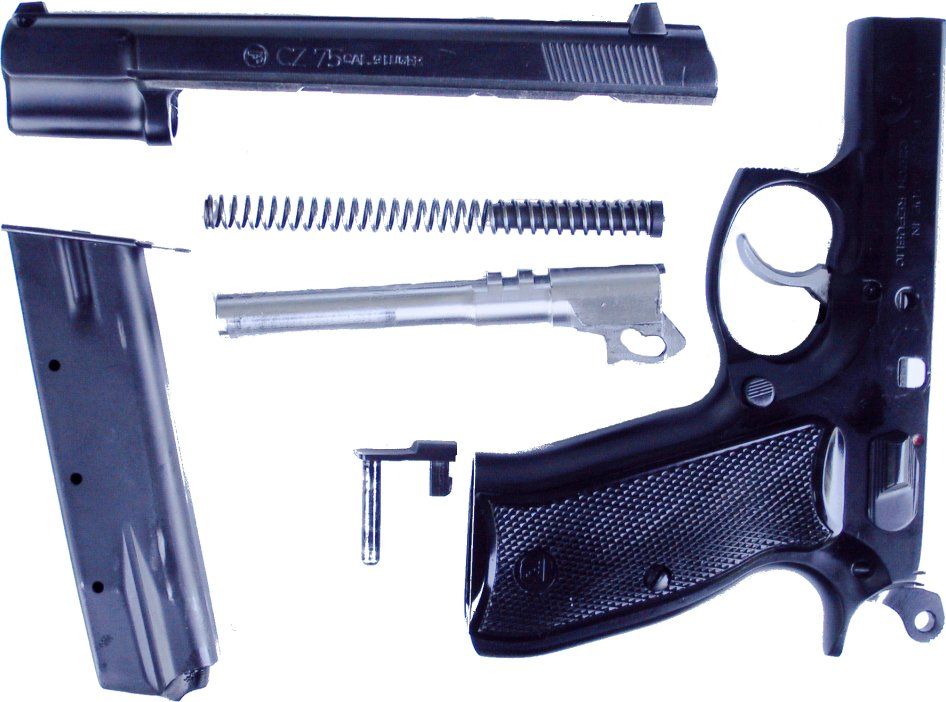
Field strip is usually required to demonstrate "safe handling".

Obtaining the license required passing a theoretical and practical exam.

- Theoretical exam: The theoretical exam consisted of a written test of 30 multiple choice questions (Created and distributed by the Ministry of the Interior) with a maximum of 79 points possible. To pass the written exam, 67 points were needed for type A, 71 for type B or C, and 74 for type D or E. The test dealt with the following issues:
  - knowledge of firearms legislation,
  - knowledge of legislation related to legitimate use of firearm (e.g. self-defense),
  - general knowledge of firearms and ammunition, and
  - first aid.
- Practical exam
  - Safe handling: this comprised
    - inspecting, whether the firearm is loaded (safely unloading),
    - field stripping as needed for clean-up,
    - preparation of firearm and ammunition for shooting, shooting, procedure of handling the firearm in case of malfunction, conclusion of shooting.
  - Touching the trigger, pointing in an other-than-safe direction or trying to field-strip a loaded gun (dummy round was used) resulted in the applicant failing the exam. Depending on the types of licenses sought, applicants may have been asked to show their ability safely to manipulate multiple firearms (typically CZ 75 and/or CZ 82 pistol, bolt-action CZ 452 rifle and a double-barreled shotgun).
  - A shooting test, which required specific scores dependent on the type of license applied for:
    - For the B type license it is 25m on rifle target (A4 sheet sized) with 4 out of 5 rounds hitting the target sheet shooting from a rifle (2 out of five for A type). .22 Long Rifle chambered rifle was used. Alternatively, an applicant could shoot a pistol on 50/20 pistol target at 10 m.
    - For the C type license, the applicant was shooting at 25m with a rifle (same as cat. B) and also had to successfully hit the rifle target from the distance of 25m shooting from a shotgun (Usually double-barreled), 3 out of 4 rounds must have hit the target (at least partially).
    - For the E type license, the applicant must have successfully hit the international pistol target 50/20 (50 cm x 50 cm) from a distance of 10m (15m for D type license) shooting from a pistol, 4 out of 5 rounds must have hit the sheet (2 out of 5 for A type).
  - In each of the cases above, the actual score was irrelevant; the projectiles simply had to hit the target sheet within the circles. Also in each case, the applicant was allowed 3 test shots to familiarise themselves with the particular firearm used for the test. The shotgun was an exception to this, where only one round was allowed as a test shot.

A person could obtain any combination of the types at once, but had to make his selections known before the exam and the highest score needed to be met. Typically, people obtained E and B type because these two types provided the best versatility (almost any firearm could be owned and carried concealed). The D type was required by law for members of the municipal police (members of the state police do not need a license for on-duty firearms) and did not itself permit private gun ownership (unless the person obtained at least one additional license type).

==== Health clearance ====
Applicant (license holder) had to be cleared by his general practitioner as being fit to possess, carry and use a firearm. The health check included probes into the applicant's anamnesis (i.e. medical history) and a complete physical screening (including eyesight, hearing, balance). The doctor may have requested examination by a specialist in case he deemed it necessary to exclude illnesses or handicaps stated in the respective governmental regulation. Specialist medical examination was obligatory in case of illnesses and handicaps that restrict the ability to drive a car.

Governmental Regulation No. 493/2002 Coll. divided the listed illnesses and handicaps into four groups, covering various issues from psychological and psychiatrical to eyesight and hearing (for example, the applicant must be able to hear casual speech over distance of 6 meters to be cleared for the E type). Generally, the regulation was more permissive when it comes to the license type A and B, and more strict with view to the other types, listing which illnesses and handicaps may curtail or outright prevent positive clearance by the general practitioner. The outcome of the medical examination may have been either full clearance, denial, or conditional clearance that listed obligatory health accessories (glasses, hearing aid, etc.) or set obligatory escort when armed (e.g. B – sport shooters with minor psychological issues, or with addiction habits cured more than three years prior to the health check).

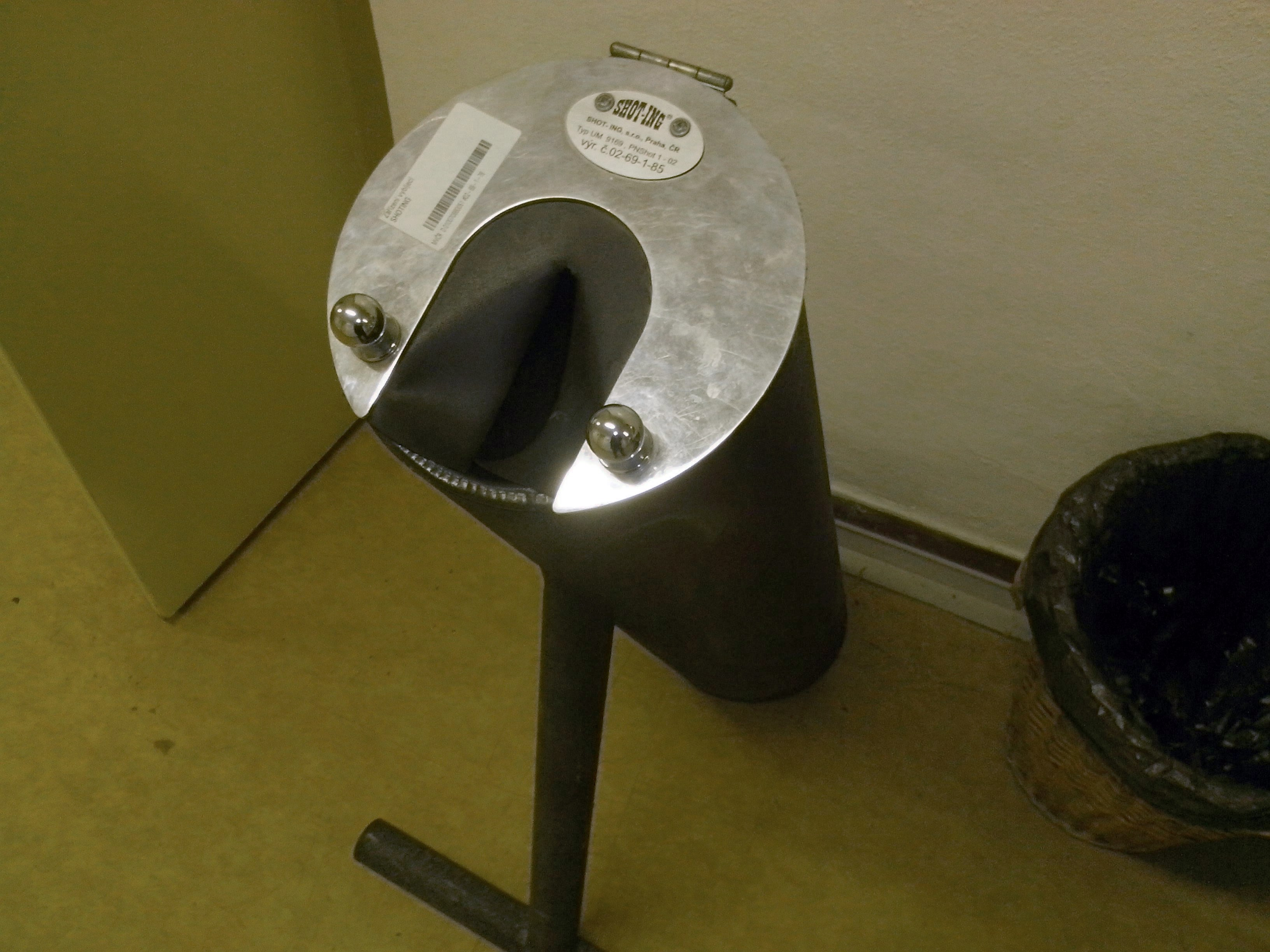
Barrel for dry firing for civilians at a police station in Karviná, Czech Republic. After unloading, a person aims the firearm into the barrel and dry fires it. The barrel is constructed so as to safely contain a fired bullet in case the owner mistakenly leaves a live cartridge in the chamber.

===== Criminal integrity =====
The enactment specified the amount of time that must had elapsed after a person was released from prison for serving time for particular groups of crimes. Ex-convicts punished for committing selected crimes, such as public endangerment, or participation in organized crime group or murder, if sentenced to more than 12 years imprisonment, could never fulfill this condition. There is a central registry of criminal offenses in the Czech Republic. The criminal integrity is reviewed notwithstanding any possible expungement of the records for other purposes.

- After being conditionally discharged, the criminal integrity was regained after the probation period ends or in 3 years in special cases
- After serving less than 2 years or being sentenced to different kind of punishment than imprisonment, the criminal integrity was regained after 5 years
- After being sentenced for 2 to 5 years, the criminal integrity was regained after 10 years
- After being sentenced for 5 to 12 years, the criminal integrity was regained after 20 years
- After being sentenced for more than 12 years (for defined crimes, such as murder, treason, etc.) the criminal integrity was never regained.

Conditional discharge did not count, only the original sentence.

Police may have ordered temporary seizure of firearm license and firearms in case that the holder was charged with any intentional crime, or a negligent crime connected with breach of duties relating to possession, carrying or use of firearms or ammunition.

===== Personal reliability =====
A person who verifiably excessively drinks alcohol or uses illegal drugs, as well as who was repeatedly found guilty of specified misdemeanors (e.g. related to firearms, DUI, public order, etc.) in the preceding three years, was considered unreliable for the purposes of issuing a gun license.

A person may have lost reliability by:

- Committing a crime and agreeing to conditional suspension of charges, until the probation period ended.
- Excessive use of alcohol or use of drugs.
- Committing multiple misdemeanors from specific segments of the law (on Firearms, Explosives, Driving under influence, public order, property and illegal hunting/fishing) within a three year period. Other types of misdemeanors did not count to personal reliability criteria.

Police may have ordered temporary seizure of firearm license and firearms in case that administrative proceedings against the holder were initiated for committing selected misdemeanors (e.g. carrying while intoxicated, refusing to undergo intoxication test while armed, shooting outside licensed range unless in self-defense).

===== Obtaining of a license by a foreigner =====
The law distinguished foreign residents according to their country of origin. For selected foreign residents, a license was shall-issue as same as for Czech citizens, while for others it was a may-issue.

- Shall-issue
  - foreigners from countries of the EU, European Economic Area and Switzerland (in case of their being granted temporary or permanent residency, then also their family members)
  - foreigners from NATO countries
  - foreigners having been granted permanent residency in the Czech Republic and long-term EU residency or long-term residency in other state of EU and longterm residency in the Czech Republic (and their family members, if having been granted long-term residency)
  - persons having been granted international asylum in the Czech Republic
- May-issue
  - other foreigners (no appeal possible against decision of appropriate police department to deny permit)

Foreign born residents were treated equally in the eye of Czech law (see above), but proof of a lack of criminal record in their country of origin must have been provided; persons having residence also in another EU country must have provided documentation showing that they are allowed to own a firearm therein. All the documents with the exception of the documents in Slovak must have been translated into Czech by a sworn translator.

Foreigners with registered place of residence in the Czech Republic may have purchased firearms after obtaining corresponding licenses and permits; persons having residence in another EU country must have provided documentation showing that they are allowed to own such a firearm therein in order to be granted a permit to purchase a B category gun.

The written test as well as the practical exam had to be taken in Czech. Until 31 December 2011, test-takers had been allowed to use a sworn interpreter/translator, but this has since been forbidden.

==== Categorization ====
===== Categories of guns =====
Under the 2002 Firearms Act, guns, ammunition and some accessories are divided into four categories (as of 2025):

Firearm category	Type of firearms	Requirements to acquire and possess	Number
Accessible to Firearms License holders
A – Restricted firearms	firearms with calibre of 20mm or larger intended for launching munitions, fully automatic firearms, insidious firearms (made or adapted in order to conceal their purpose or to inflict more serious effect, or masked as other objects), firearms made from non-metal elements if they are unidentifiable during baggage control by detection and RTG machines, shooting booby traps, ammunition with armor piercing, explosive, incendiary or other bullet with active charge, with exception of signal projectiles	Gun license; May-issue exemption; Registration	744
A-I – Restricted firearms	automatic firearms which have been converted into semi-automatic firearms; semi-automatic firearms, into which an over-the-limit magazine was inserted; semi-automatic long firearms that are originally intended to be fired from the shoulder that are fitted with a folding, telescoping or without-tools-removable stock, the folding, telescoping or removing of which can reduce its length of less than 600 mm without affecting functionality; air or blank-firing, unless made according to a special regulation; ammunition intended for short firearms with expanding bullet	Gun license; shall-issue exemption; Registration	7,041 (Category introduced in 2021 as EU Directive implementation / complete grandfathering)
B – Guns requiring permit	short repeating or semi-automatic firearms; short single or multiple shot firearms; rim-fire firearms under 280 mm of length; long semi-automatic firearms with magazine capacity over 3 rounds or with a detachable magazine; long firearms with non-rifled barrel under 600 mm of length; single or multiple shot, repeating or semi-automatic long firearms not mentioned in the previous two bullet-points; semi-automatic firearms if they resemble fully automatic firearms; signal weapons with calibre over 16 mm	Gun license; Shall-issue permit; Registration	494,229
C – Guns requiring registration	single shot or repeating rimfire firearms longer than 280 mm; single, multiple, repeating or semi-automatic long rifles for rimfire or centerfire ammunition or Lefaucheux cartridge not included in B category, air rifles with muzzle energy over 16J, apart from paintball, suppressors; more than two shot and repeating black powder firearms	Gun license; Registration	445,102
Firearms License not required
C-I – Guns requiring registration	originally A, A-I, B, C firearms that were deactivated in line with respective EU Regulation.; blank-firing made in accordance with special regulation; single or two shot black powder firearms; firearms for flobert, 4mm M20 or other cartridge with similar muzzle energy intended for adversarial training; gas weapons with caliber larger than 6,35mm, apart from paintball; firearms intended for adversarial training with muzzle energy no more than 20J; signal firearms with caliber larger than 16mm; taser	18 years of age; full legal capacity; place of residence in the Czech Republic; clean criminal record; full mental capacity; registration	2,692 (2021) (Category introduced in 2021 as EU Directive implementation / complete grandfathering)
D – Guns available to adults above 18	historical firearms, paintball; gas weapons with caliber smaller than 6,35mm; blank firing machines; deactivated firearms that are not subject to EU Regulation and which were made permanently inoperable; cut-away replicas; non-active torsos of firearms; non-active ammunition; firearms not mentioned in categories A,A-I,B,C,C-I,D	18 years of age	N/A

A person needed the Gun License (Zbrojní průkaz) to own a firearm of categories A, A-I, B and C. To own a gun in the D category only the age of 18 was required. A, A-I, B, C and C-I category weapon had to be registered within 10 working day with the police after they were bought.

===== Other =====
Item	Classification	Requirements
Ammunition reloading		Gun permit or possession of D category firearms of that caliber
Black powder		Possession of black powder firearm.
Standard ammunition		A, B, C type gun license, or; D, E type of gun license and firearm appropriate to use the ammunition
Expanding ammunition for use in long firearm		Gun license
Expanding ammunition for use in short firearm	A-I	gun license; shall-issue "exemption permit" (general one-time)
Armour piercing, incendiary, explosive ammunition	A	A type gun license; may-issue exemption (for particular type and number)
Magazines w/ capacity max 10/20 (long/short gun)		None
Magazines w/ capacity over 10/20 (long/short gun)	"Over-the-limit-magazines"	A-I category firearm (only mags for use in the firearm), or; shall-issue "exemption permit" (general one-time).
Silencers	C category accessory	gun license; registration
Tasers	C-I category firearm	18 years of age; full legal capacity; place of residence in the Czech Republic; absence of felony conviction; full mental capacity; registration
Laser sights		None
Night vision scopes		None
Mechanical weapons (bows, crossbows)		None
Cold weapons		None
Pepper sprays		None
Electric paralyzers		None

==== Obtaining firearms ====
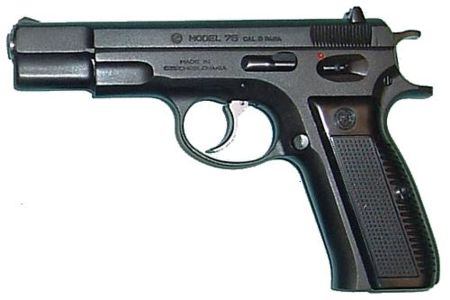
ČZ 75 is the most common firearm in the country.

A, A-I, B and C category of firearms may have been acquired and possessed only by gun license holders and their transfer had to be registered with police within 10 days. A-category firearms may have been acquired only for collecting purposes and were subject to may-issue exemption. Each of A-I and B category firearm was subject to shall-issue permitting process individually. C category firearms could be purchased by any gun license holder.

C-I category of firearms may have been acquired and possessed by a person older than 18, with full legal capacity, place of residence in the Czech Republic, without conviction for selected felonies, full mental capacity. Transfer must have been registered with police within 10 days.

D category firearms were available to anyone older than 18 and are not subject to registration.

There was no limit in the law on the number of owned guns. The law specified safe storage requirements for those owning more than two weapons or more than 500 rounds of ammunition. Additional safe storage requirements were stipulated for those owning more than 10 and more than 20 firearms.

Possession of a firearm that did not belong to category D or C-I without a gun license (as well as sale, manufacturing, procurement, etc.) was a criminal offense which carried a penalty of up to two years imprisonment (up to eight years in defined cases).

==== Using firearms and shooting ranges ====
Shooting is permitted only within licensed shooting ranges or when allowed by special laws, e.g. hunting or self-defense.

Shooting of blank rounds or signal weapons is also permitted in case that it does not threaten life, health and public order.

There are about two hundred places opened for the public. Any adult can visit such a range and shoot from available weapons. A person without a gun license has to be supervised (if younger than 18, then by a person at least 21 years old who has been a holder of a gun license for at least 3 years).

==== Rules on open and concealed carry ====
Gun safes for visitors at a Czech courthouse

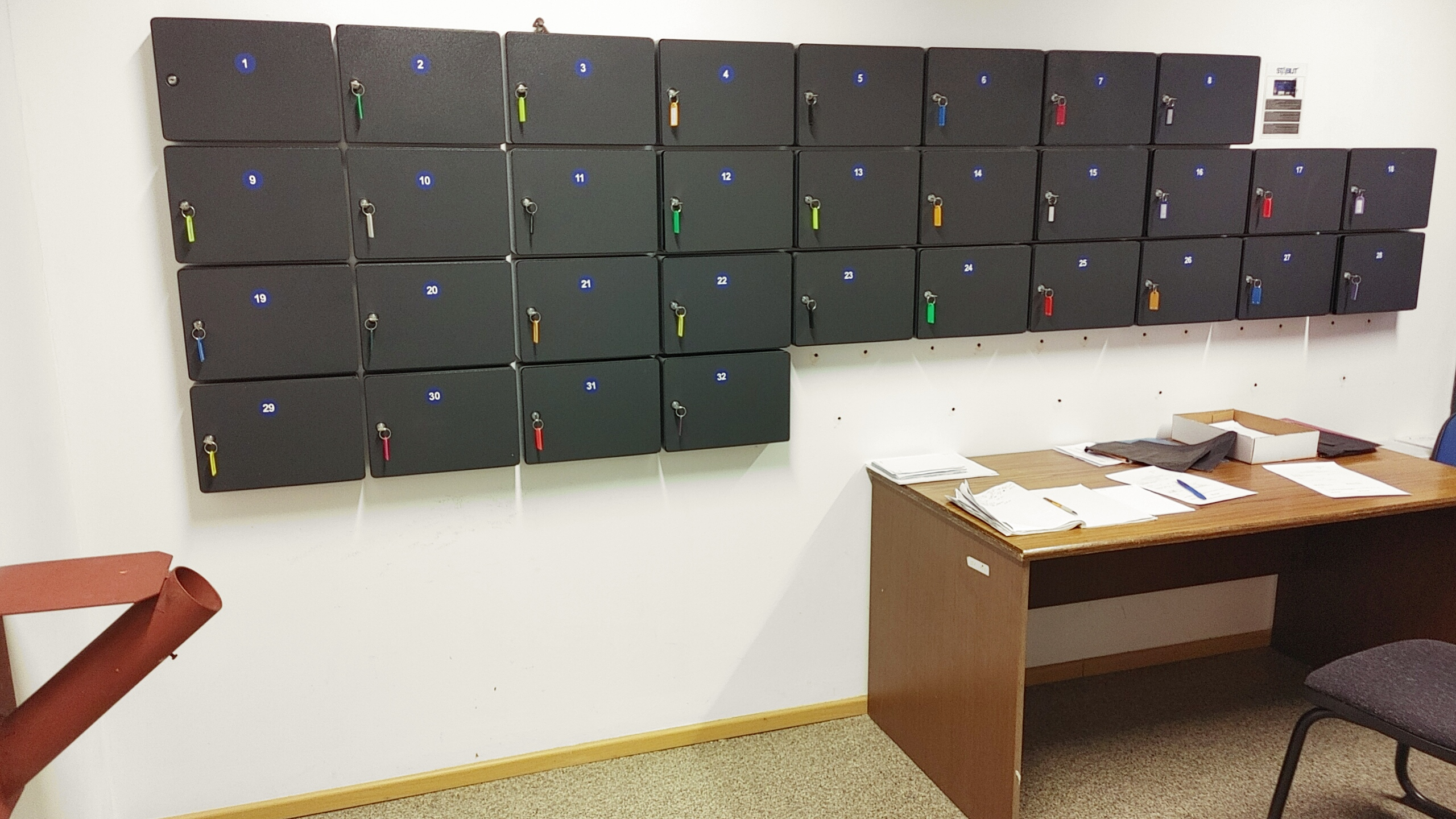
Gun safes for civilian firearms at a courthouse in Prague. It is forbidden to carry any weapons within a courthouse. Visitors can leave their firearms at gun safes upon entry, before undergoing airport-style security check.

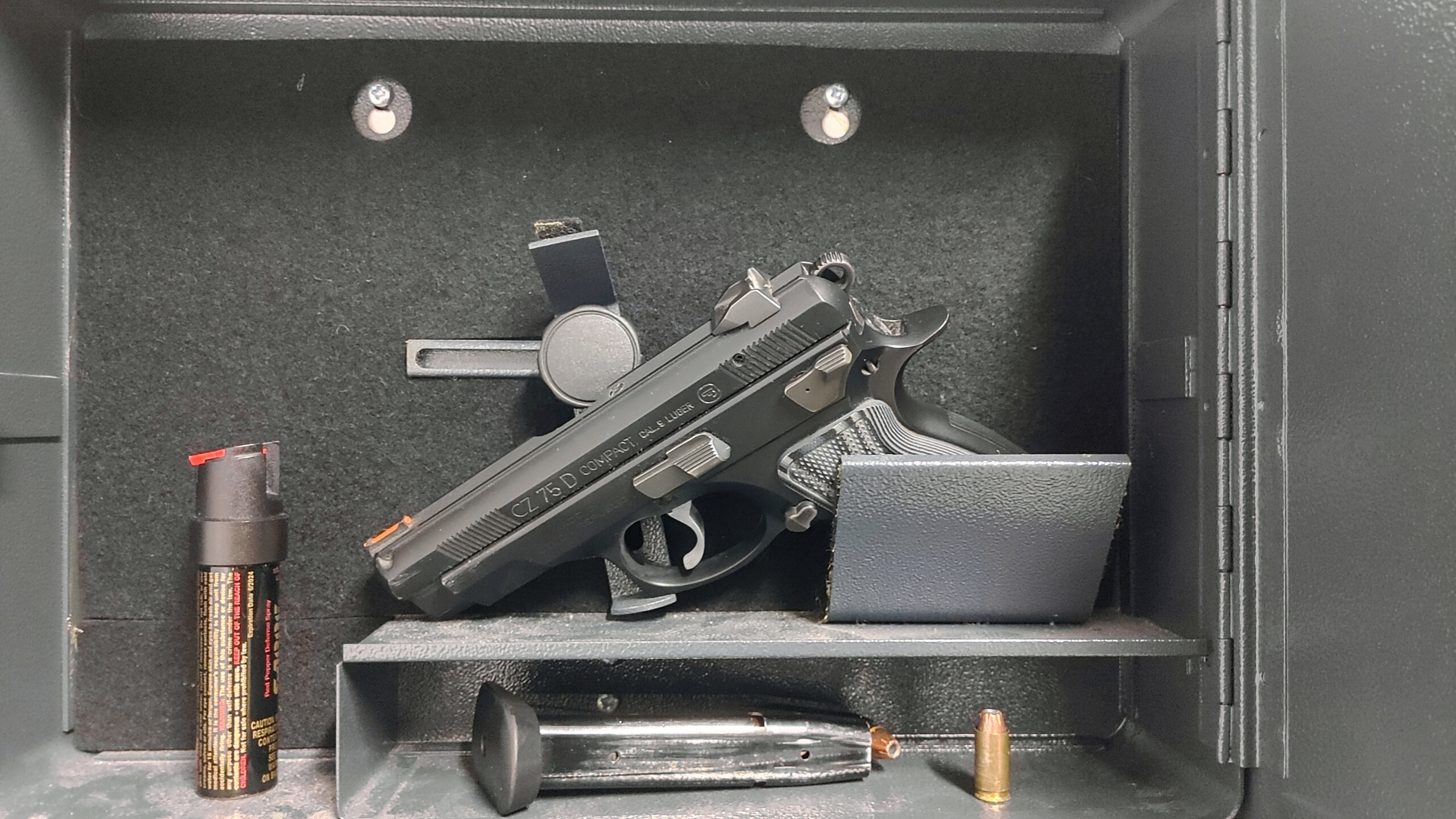
Visitor's unloaded pistol and a pepper spray within a courthouse gun safe

Rules on carrying of firearms underwent general overhaul on 30 January 2021, allowing more flexibility for open carry of firearms during special events when open carry is considered customary, e.g. military re-enactment (including movement of units in historical uniforms between reenactment locations) and sports (e.g. biathlon).

- Permitless carry
  - Concealed carry: Firearms of D and C-I category (e.g. black powder derringer or gas pistol) must be carried in concealed manner.
  - Open carry: Similar rules as in case of gun license holders below.
- A, B, C type gun license holders:
  - General rule: Firearms must be transported unloaded and in closed container.
  - Open carry in publicly accessibly areas is possible in case that all of the following conditions are met:
    - firearm is unloaded, and
    - it is done within context of conducting activity that includes shooting or similar handling of firearms and ammunition, the rules of which permit gun license holder to open carry of a firearm, and
    - it is permitted as regards the chosen means of transport; when using public transport, a firearm must always be within a closed container, and
    - it may be considered appropriate under local conditions and within given activity, and
    - it does not disturb public order.
  - Open carry of loaded long firearm is also possible within hunting areas.
- D, E type gun license holders:
  - Concealed carry: Up to two firearms (loaded, with a round chambered).
  - Open carry within privately owned premises: The Firearms Act defines having a firearm within "residential or commercial premises or within clearly demarcated real estate with the consent of the owner or tenant of said premises or real estate" as possession, not carrying within the legal meaning of the term. As such, owners or tenants of clearly demarcated privately owned, publicly accessible properties may allow factual open carry within their premises.
- D type gun license holders working for Municipal Police or Czech National Bank while on duty:
  - Open carry: Up to two firearms (loaded, with a round chambered).

It is prohibited to carry or transport a firearm with silencer installed.

Carrying firearm while intoxicated is illegal and can lead to heavy fines and loss of the gun license. Police often conduct intoxication tests of open-carrying hunters.

The law does not include any "gun-free zones" provisions, apart from general prohibition of firearm carry during protests and demonstrations. Public authorities that enact and practically enforce ban on firearm carrying within their premises are legally bound to provide option for storing a short firearm upon entry (either in a safe compliant with the Firearms Act or with a police officer).

The Czech Republic is a relatively safe country: Prague, with the highest crime rate in the country, still ranks as one of the safest capitals in the European Union. Considering the number of E type licenses issued, there are over 260,000 people who can legally carry a firearm for self-defense, of which over 210.000 people actually do so according to a 2024 survey.

==== Ammunition and magazine restrictions ====
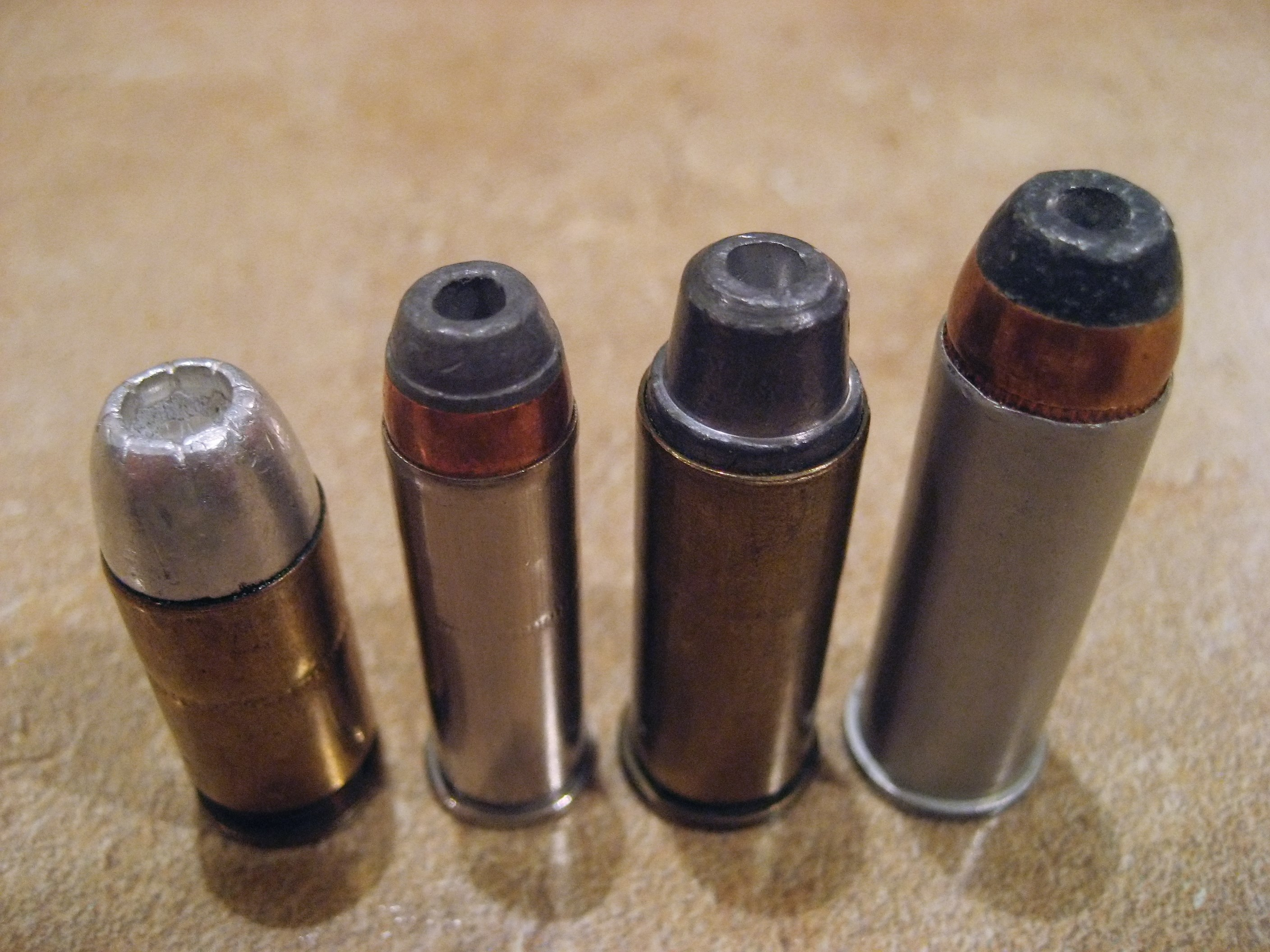
Hollow point ammunition may be used in short firearms subject to acquiring a shall-issue "exemption permit" and is unregulated for use in long firearms.

Ammunition may be purchased only by a gun license holder. Owners of historical firearms (D - category) can also purchase ammunition suitable for their firearm without a gun license.

High-penetrating (armor-piercing) ammunition is classified as category A.

Hollow point bullets for use in short firearms are classified in A-I category and available subject to shall-issue exemption permit. For use in long firearms, hollow point bullets are treated the same as other types of ammunition.

There are no restrictions on caliber type, however firearms with caliber larger than 20mm (apart from signal weapons) are classified as category A. Special safe storage requirements apply for those having more than 500, 10,000 and 20,000 cartridges.

A January 2021 amendment of the Firearms Act necessitated by the EU Gun Ban introduced a new category of "over-the-limit magazines", i.e. those holding more than 10/20 rounds for use in long/short firearms. These may be used in a B category firearm subject to shall issue exemption permit; previous owners were grandfathered.

==== Armament licences ====
Gun licences equivalent for conducting business with firearms. Divided into 11 types.

- A – Development or manufacturing of firearms/ammunition
- B – Repairs, modifications or deactivation of firearms/ammunition
- C – Firearms/ammunition buying and selling
- D – Lending and safekeeping of firearms/ammunition
- E – Deactivation or destruction of weapons/ammunition
- F – Training in handling and using firearms/ammunition
- G – Providing security for persons/property.
- H – Cultural, sports and hobby shooting activities.
- I – Collecting and displaying firearms/ammunition
- J – Securing tasks defined by special legal enactments.
- K – Pyrotechnical Survey (replaced F type gun licence in 2017)

==== Minor changes to the 2002 Firearms Act ====
The 2002 Firearms Act was amended multiple times, however most of the changes were minor. The main basics of the law were unchanged.

- 2004 – inclusion of pyrotechnical survey under the act (new type F license)
- 2005 – change of definition of historical firearms (i.e. D Cat not requiring license) from "developed or manufactured prior to 1890" to "manufactured prior to 1890" (i.e. functional replica possession requires license)
- 2008
  - inclusion of citizens of European Economic Area and Switzerland under the same set rules pertaining to citizens of EU countries
  - tighter sanctions for use of firearms (concealed carry, hunting, shooting at ranges) while intoxicated (loss of license)
- 2009 – exemption for A category firearms may now be given only A type license holder (e.g. exemptions for fully automatic firearms would newly be given only for firearms collection purposes, not for self-defense), A category firearms may not be conceal carried any more,
- 2014
  - new licenses issued for 10 years instead of 5
  - in case that police has a well founded suspicion that the gun owner's state of health has changed so as to lead to loss of his health clearance, they may ask him to present a new health clearance, failure to do so within 30 days may lead to revocation of license
  - new possibility of license owner to surrender the license, if he wishes to do so
  - possibility of B and C type license holders to obtain exemption for A category accessories (e.g. night vision scope for hunters)
  - E type license holder allowed to reload ammunition for their own purposes (before, only B and C type license holders)
- 2016
  - in case that police have a well founded suspicion that the gun owner's state of health has changed so as to lead to loss of his health clearance so that he may present danger to self or others, they may provisionally seize his firearms and ammo; in case that the given person fails to comply, police may also enter his home without judicial warrant to do so; however, firearms must be returned to the owner immediately after reasons for seizure expire (e.g. owner presents new health clearance) – adopted in reaction to Uherský Brod shooting
  - police allowed to enter home and other premises without judicial warrant in case that other reason for seizure of firearms exists and the owner has failed to surrender them (e.g. indictment for intentional felony)
  - police use new registry of misdemeanors for determination of personal reliability – adopted in reaction to Uherský Brod shooting
- 2017 (effective since August 2017, delayed part of 2016 amendment)
  - laser sights are not A category accessory any more
  - government loses authority to order surrender of firearms during state of emergency or war
  - F type license no longer issued, transferred to armament license

== Recent developments ==
=== 2014 European parliamentary elections ===
Generally, firearms possession is not a politicized issue that would be debated during Czech elections. The 2014 European Parliament election became an exception in connection with the Swedish European Commissioner Cecilia Malmström's initiative to introduce new common EU rules that would significantly restrict the possibilities of legally owning firearms.

In connection with that, a Czech gun owners association asked the parties running in the elections in the Czech Republic whether they agree (1) that the citizens should have the right to own and carry firearms, (2) that the competence on deciding firearms issues should lie in the hands of the nation states and not be decided on the EU level, and (3) whether they support Malmström's activity leading to the curbing of the right of upstanding citizens to own and carry firearms. Out of 39 parties running, 22 answered. The answers were almost unanimously positive to the first two questions and negative to the third one. Exceptions were only two fringe parties, the Greens – which, while supporting the right for gun ownership in its current form, also support further unification of rules on the European level and labeled the opposing reaction to Malmström's proposal as premature, and the Pirates which support unification of the rules leading to less restrictions elsewhere, commenting that one may not cross the borders out of the Czech Republic legally even with a pepper spray. Other fringe parties at the same time voiced their intent to introduce American style castle doctrine or to arm the general population following the example of the Swiss militia.

=== 2015 European Union "Gun Ban" Directive ===
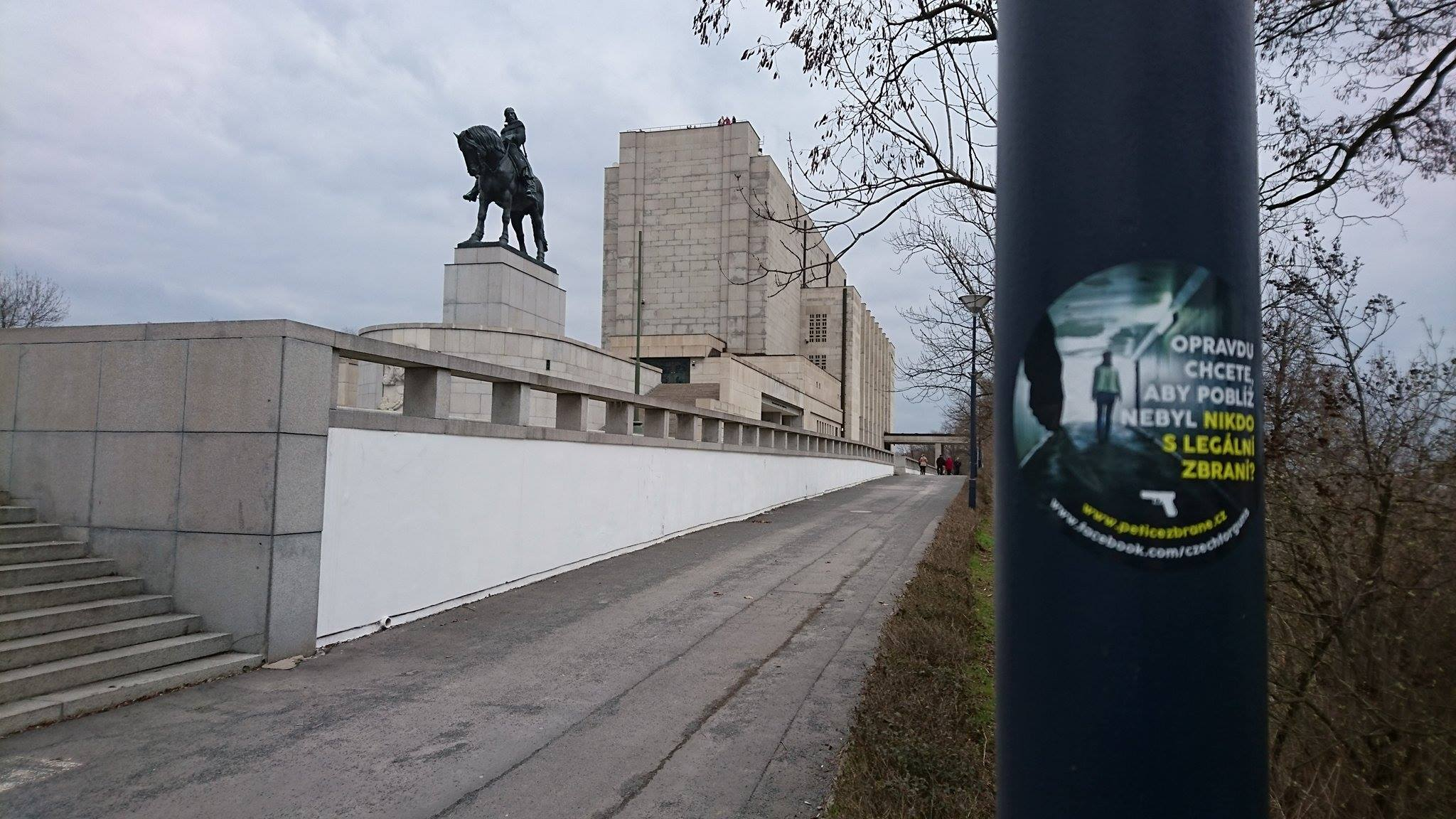
"Would you really like nobody legally armed to be anywhere nearby?" A sticker promoting petition against EU Gun Ban on a lamp post at the National Monument in Vitkov, Prague.

The European Commission proposed a package of measures aimed to "make it more difficult to acquire firearms in the European Union" on 18 November 2015. President Juncker introduced the aim of amending the European Firearms Directive as a Commission's reaction to a previous wave of Islamist terror attacks in several EU cities. The main aim of the Commission proposal rested in banning B7 firearms (and objects that look alike), even though no such firearm has previously been used during commitment of a terror attack in EU (of 31 terror attacks, 9 were committed with guns, the other 22 with explosives or other means. Of these 9, 8 cases made use of either illegally smuggled or illegally refurbished deactivated firearms while during the 2015 Copenhagen shootings a military rifle stolen from the army was used.)

The proposal, which became widely known as the "EU Gun Ban", would in effect ban most legally owned firearms in the Czech Republic, was met with rejection:

- Government Resolution No. 428/2016 of 11 May 2016

The Government tasks the Prime Minister, the First Vice-Prime Minister for Economy and Minister of Finance, Minister of Interior, Minister of Defense, Minister of Industry and Trade, Minister of Foreign Affairs, Minister of Agriculture and Minister of Labor and Social Affairs to (1) conduct any and all procedural, political and diplomatic measures necessary to prevent adoption of such a proposal of European Directive, that would amend the Directive No. 91/477/EEC in a way which would excessively affect the rights of the citizens of the Czech Republic and which would have negative effect on internal order, defense capabilities and economical or labor situation in the Czech Republic and (2) enforce such changes to the proposal of directive that would amend the directive no. 91/477/EEC that will allow preservation of the current level of civil rights of citizens of the Czech Republic and which will prevent negative impact on internal order, defense capabilities and economical and labor situation in the Czech Republic.

- Resolution of Chamber of Deputies No. 668/2016 of 20 April 2016

The Chamber of Deputies (1) expresses disapproval with the European Commission proposal to limit the possibility of acquisition and possession of firearms that are held legally in line with national laws of EU Member States, (2) refuses European Commission's infringement into a well established system of control, evidence, acquisition and possession of firearms and ammunition laid down by the Czech law, (3) expresses support for establishment of any and all functional measures to combat illegal trade, acquisition, possession and other illegal manipulation with firearms, ammunition and explosives, (4) refuses European Commission's persecution of Member States and their citizens through unjustified tightening of legal firearms possession as a reaction to terror attacks in Paris and (5) recommends the Prime Minister to conduct any and all legal and diplomatic steps to prevent enactment of a directive that would disrupt the Czech legal order in the area of trade, control, acquisition and possession of firearms and thus inappropriately infringe into the rights of the citizens of the Czech Republic.

- Senate Resolution No. 401/2016 of 20 April 2016

Senate (…) (2) points out that the Commission’s directive proposal should be primarily aimed at illegal acquisition and possession of firearms, their proper deactivation and illegal firearms trade, as it is illegal firearms that are used during terror attacks, not firearms possessed in line with law of Member States and thus (3) disagrees with measures proposed in the directive that would lead to limitation of legal firearms owners and to disruption of internal security of the Czech Republic without having any clear preventive or repressive impact on persons possessing firearms illegally; such measures are contrary to the principles of subsidiarity and proportionality (...)

- Joint Declaration of Ministers of the Interior of Visegrád Group of 19 January 2016

The Ministers are fully aware of the need to fight actively against terrorism. As regards the regulation of the possession of firearms, it is necessary to focus the adopted measures primarily on illegal firearms, not legally-held firearms. Illegal firearms represent a serious threat. Within the European Union, it is necessary to prevent infiltration of illegal firearms from the risk areas. It should be taken into account that bans on possession of certain types of firearms that are not, in fact, abused for terrorist acts can lead to negative consequences, especially to a transition of these firearms into the illegal sphere. The V4 states have profound historical experience with such implications.

Ministry of Interior published in May 2016 its Impact Assessment Analysis on the proposed revision of directive No. 91/477/EEC. According to the Ministry, the main impacts of the proposal, if passed, would be:

- Risks to internal security: According to Czech Ministry of Interior, the main danger of the proposal rested in massive transfer of now legal firearms into illegality, with up to hundreds of thousands of legal firearms entering black market. While the original Commission proposal would affect 40,000 – 50,000 firearms legally possessed by Czech citizens, Dutch EU Council Presidency proposal of 4 April 2016 would affect some 400,000 legally owned firearms, i.e. making half of all Czech legally owned firearms illegal with large proportion of gun owners likely refusing to surrender their firearms. The proposal as such is in direct contradiction with the Ministry's long-term objective of lowering of number of illegal firearms and of conducting effective supervision of firearm owners.
- Risk to defensive capabilities: Security forces are not changing armaments annually, and thus small arms manufacturers need civilians as key customers. Crippling of civilian firearms market would likely lead to end of firearms manufacturing in the Czech Republic. At the same time, familiarity with semi-automatic versions of army rifles by civilians is a clear defensive advantage in case these people need to be drafted to defend the country.
- Threat to national culture: The proposal would lead to permanent deactivation of firearms owned by collectors and museums, including army museums, even though there is no empirical data supporting need for such a measure.
- Rise of unemployment: The proposal would lead to cancellation of tens of thousands of work places in the Czech Republic alone.
- Impact on hunting: Semiautomatic rifles have been purposefully used for hunting in the Czech Republic since at least 1946 and they are especially effective and popular in curbing wild boar overpopulation that is responsible for large number of car accidents as well as damage to agriculture. Banning of these firearms would likely lead to increase of car accidents due to collisions with wild animals and consequent increase in number of injuries and fatalities.
- Impact on state budget: As Czech constitution does not allow confiscation without remuneration, the government would have to pay up to tens of billions of Czech crowns (billions of Euros) as compensation for banned firearms. Meanwhile, rise in unemployment would further impact budget income.

Despite reservations of the Czech Republic and Poland, the Directive was adopted by majority vote of the European Council and by first reading vote with no public debate in the European Parliament. It was published in the Official Journal under No. (EU) 2017/853 on 17 May 2017. Member States will have 15 months to implement the Directive into its national legal systems. The Czech Government announced that it will lodge a suit against the directive in front of the European Court of Justice, seeking postponement of its effectiveness as well as complete invalidation, and did so on 9 August 2017.

=== 2016 Constitutional Amendment Proposal (rejected) ===
1. The security of the Czech Republic is provided by the armed forces, armed security corps, rescue corps and emergency services.
2. The state authorities, territorial governments and legal and natural persons are obliged to participate in the provision of security of the Czech Republic. The scope of duties and other details are set by law.
3. Citizens of the Czech Republic have the right to acquire, possess and carry arms and ammunition in order to fulfill the tasks set in subsection 2. This right may be limited by law and law may set further conditions for its exercise in case that it is necessary for protection of rights and freedoms of others, of public order and safety, lives and health or in order to prevent criminality.

— Failed proposal to amend Article 3 of Constitutional Act no. 110/1998 Col., on Security of the Czech Republic lodged by 36 MPs on 6 February 2017 (Subsection 1 & 2 are preexisting, subsection No. 3 was newly proposed in the Amendment.)

Ministry of Interior proposed a constitutional amendment on 15 December 2016 aimed at providing constitutional right to acquire, possess and carry firearms. The proposed law would, if passed, add a new section to Constitutional Act No. 110/1998 Col., on Security of the Czech Republic, expressly providing the right to be armed as part of citizen's duty of participation in provision of internal order, security and democratic order.

According to explanatory note to the proposal, it aims at utilisation of already existing specific conditions as regards firearms ownership in the Czech Republic (2.75% of adult population having concealed carry license) for security purposes as a reaction to current threats – especially isolated attacks against soft targets. While there is constitutional right to self-defense, its practical utilization without any weapon is only illusory.

The note further elaborates that unlike the rest of the EU, where most guns are owned for hunting, the vast majority of Czech gun owners possess firearms suitable for protection of life, health and property, explicitly mentioning, inter alia, semi-automatic rifles (which are subject to the proposed EU Gun Ban, see above).

As regards adherence to EU law, the explanatory note states:

- The proposal falls outside of jurisdiction of EU law, as
  - Article 4(2) of TEU respects basic functions of state, including maintenance of public order and provision of national security.
  - Article 72 of TFEU states that "This Title shall not affect the exercise of the responsibilities incumbent upon Member States with regard to the maintenance of law and order and the safeguarding of internal security."
  - Article 276 of TFEU: "In exercising its powers regarding the provisions of Chapters 4 and 5 of Title V of Part Three relating to the area of freedom, security and justice, the Court of Justice of the European Union shall have no jurisdiction to review (...) the exercise of the responsibilities incumbent upon Member States with regard to the maintenance of law and order and the safeguarding of internal security."
- The proposal falls outside of scope of the Firearms Directive, as
  - territorial authority of the proposal falls strictly within the Czech Republic
  - personal authority of the proposal falls strictly on citizens of the Czech Republic and does not extend even to EU foreigners living in the country
  - the proposal does not deal with acquisition of firearms for the purposes of hunting and sport shooting, which are the main areas that the Firearms Directive is concerned with

The Minister of Interior Milan Chovanec stated that he aims, due to pressing security threats, at having the proposal enacted before the autumn 2017 Czech Parliamentary Elections. The right to be armed further became a major political issue with explicit impact as regards possible future Czech-EU relationship and membership, when the Civic Democratic Party took a pledge to "defend the right of law abiding citizens to be armed even if it would mean facing EU sanctions."

On 6 February 2017, Minister Chovanec and 35 other Members of Chamber of Deputies of the Czech Parliament officially lodged proposal of the constitutional amendment with modified wording. In order to pass, the proposal must gain support of 3/5 of all Members of Chamber of Deputies (120 out of 200) and 3/5 of Senators present. Explanatory note to the proposal states that it aims at preventing significant negative impacts of proposed EU Firearms Directive amendment that would lead to transition of now legal firearms to black market. It aims to utilize to the maximum possible extent both exemptions of the Directive proposal as well as the sole authority of national law provided in the EU's primary law for issues of national security The legislative process continued as follows:

- 27 February 2017: the proposal was discussed by the Government of the Czech Republic, showing a clear split between coalition parties as all 7 ČSSD Ministers supported the proposal, while ANO and KDU-ČSL Ministers either rejected it or abstained. Lacking majority in either way, the Government did not take any official position on the proposal. Legally, under the Article 44(2) of the Czech Constitution, failure to declare any opinion on a proposed act by Government means that the Government supports the proposal. Government's position is only advisory.
- 12 April 2017: The proposal entered first reading in the Chamber of Deputies. There were altogether 57 entries of MPs and Ministers into the debate. None proposed vote for dismissal. The proposal was assigned to Constitutional Committee (143 votes out of 146 present) and to Security Committee (136 votes out of 147 present) to make an advisory recommendation. The Committees' time for deliberation was shortened to 54 days (98 to 25 outcome out of 147 present).
- 19 April 2017: Following discussion, the Security Committee endorsed the proposal by a vote of 10 to 1.
- 31 March 2017: The Constitutional Committee endorsed the proposal. Out of 12 present deputies, 11 supported it and 1 abstained from voting.
- 7 June 2017: The proposal entered second reading in the Chamber of Deputies. With no motions for dismissal or for changes of the lodged text, the proposal moved to third reading in line with recommendation of the two Committees representatives, whose were the only entries into the debate concerning the proposal.
- 28 June 2017: The proposal entered third and final reading in the Chamber of Deputies. After nearly 3 hours of debate, the proposal passed with 139 votes. Only 9 deputies voted against it. The proposal was supported by Social democrats (40 voted in favour, 3 abstained or didn't log in), ANO (39 voted in favour, 1 against, 3 abstained or didn't log in), Communist party (24 voted in favour, 1 against, 7 abstained or didn't log in), Civic Democrats (All 15 present deputies voted for) and the original Dawn of Direct Democracy deputies (9 voted in favour and 3 abstained or didn't log in).The support was much lower in TOP 09 (9 voted in favour, 2 against and 11 abstained or didn't log in) and especially KDU-ČSL (3 voted in favour, 5 against and 4 abstained).
- 24 July 2017: The proposal was officially handed over from the Chamber of Deputies to the Senate. Before this happened, the Permanent Senate Committee for Constitution and Parliamentary Procedures adopted on 11 July 2017 Resolution No. 5 which labels the proposal as "useless and potentially harmful". Out of 8 Senators and non-senate members of the committee present, 6 supported the Resolution proposed by Committee's chair and former Constitutional Court Justice Eliška Wagnerová. Two senators abstained.
- 5 October 2017: A petition against the EU Gun Ban signed by over 100.000 citizens was debated during a public hearing in the Senate. Apart from the EU Directive, the debate largely centered on the proposed amendment.
- The plenary session of the Senate postponed a vote on the proposal planned on 11 October 2017 to a later date.
- The Senate voted on the proposal on 6 December 2017. Only 28 out of 59 Senators present supported the proposal, failing to reach the 36 votes necessary. The proposal was thus sacked. On the same day, the Senate adopted a resolution calling upon the Government not to implement parts of the EU Gun Ban that are not related to fighting terrorism, i.e. restrictions legal firearms that had not been used during commitment of any of terror attacks.

The proposal was generally expected to be submitted again in Parliament after the 2018 autumn Senate elections, which ended with a decisive victory for the Civic Democratic Party (ODS), a conservative party in favor of the amendment. However, late President of the Senate, Jaroslav Kubera (ODS), claimed that it would have "no chance to pass", simply due to the general Senate tendency to avoid any changes to the Constitution and Constitutional, which was in place as opposition to the PM Andrej Babiš, who had expressed his plans to introduce significant constitutional changes).

=== 2021 Constitutional Amendment (approved) ===
(1) Everyone has the right to life. Human life is worthy of protection even before birth.
(2) Nobody may be deprived of her life.
(3) The death penalty is prohibited.
(4) Deprivation of life is not inflicted in contravention of this Article if it occurs in connection with conduct which is not criminal under the law. The right to defend own life or life of another person also with arms is guaranteed under conditions set out in the law.

— 2021 Amendment of Article 6 of the Charter of Fundamental Rights and Freedoms, which was lodged by 35 Senators on 24 September 2019 (Text in italics was preexisting, the last sentence in subsection 4 was newly added in 2021.)

On 24 September 2019 a group of 35 Senators lodged formal proposal to amend the Charter of Fundamental Rights and Freedoms to include right to defend life with arms. The proposal was drafted by senator Martin Červíček (ODS), retired police brigadier general and 2012 - 2014 Police of the Czech Republic president. The proposal was originally planned for debate during a Senate meeting in October 2019. The Senate may formally propose adoption of the amendment through a simple majority of votes. In order to pass, the proposal must then gain support of 3/5 of all Members of Chamber of Deputies (120 out of 200) and then be voted through the Senate again, this time with majority of at least 3/5 of Senators present.

Media dubbed the proposal "Czech Republic's second amendment" both in connection with the protection of the right to keep and bear arms in the US constitution and due to the fact that the Czech Charter of Fundamental Rights and Freedoms had only been amended once since adoption in 1992. The first amendment to the Charter had been adopted in 1998 and extended the maximum length of police custody without charges from original 24 hours to 48 hours.

According to the Czech gun laws expert and attorney Tomáš Gawron the proposal bears no resemblance to the American second amendment. Unlike its US counterpart, the Czech proposal does not stipulate a restraint on Government's power, but only symbolically sets out significance of the mentioned right and otherwise leaves the Government a free hand in setting detailed conditions in law. By being mostly symbolic, the proposal is more similar to Article 10 of the Mexican constitution. Also while the American second amendment centers on the right to keep and bear arms, the Czech proposal deals primarily with right of personal defense, including with arms.

Senate voted to formally propose adoption of the Constitutional Amendment on 11 June 2020. 41 out of 61 senators voted for the measure. That was sufficient to start the legislative process, i.e. to submit the proposal for the vote at the Chamber of Deputies, for which a simple majority is needed. However the number fell one vote short of reaching constitutional majority. Constitutional majority must be reached once the amendment is accepted by the Chamber of Deputies and bill moved back to the Senate for final approval. The legislative process continued as follows:

- 13 July 2020: The Government formally recommended adoption of the proposal, which indicated support of Chamber majority. According to Government's formal opinion, the proposal does not bring material change into the legal system, only constitutionally confirms already existing legal state. The Government further pointed out that while the Senate clearly aimed at firearms, due to the proposal's wording it will cover all weapons, including knives, axes and other arms.
- October 2020: During the 2020 Czech Senate election, the most vocal opponents of the proposal lost their bids for re-election. This significantly raised chances of reaching constitutional majority in the Senate.
- 9 March 2021: Chamber of Deputies started formal debate on the proposal. It was assigned for consideration to the Constitutional Committee (83 votes out of 90 present, none against) and to the Security Committee (69 votes out of 91 present, none against). Proposal by a deputy from the Czech Pirate Party to assign the proposal also to the Permanent Committee on Constitution was rejected (35 votes out of 95 present, 9 against).
- 18 March 2021: Security Committee of the Chamber of Deputies endorsed the proposal and recommended its adoption.
- 28 April 2021: Constitutional Committee of the Chamber of Deputies endorsed the proposal and recommended its adoption.
- 2 June 2021: The proposal entered second reading in the Chamber of Deputies. Pirate Party member Vojtěch Pikal entered a proposal for a change, whereby instead of adding the aforementioned sentence into Article 6(4) of the Charter, a new Article 41(3) would be added into the Charter: "The right to defend basic rights and freedoms also with arms is guaranteed under conditions set out in the law." The proposal for a change was labeled as better than original amendment proposal, however with lower chances of passing through the Senate.
- 9 June 2021: Constitutional Committee recommended adoption of the original amendment proposal and rejection of Pirate Party Vojtěch Pikal's proposal for a change.
- 18 June 2021: The proposal entered third (final) reading in the Chamber of Deputies. Out of 159 deputies present, 141 deputies supported the proposal, only 3 deputies voted against it; the remaining 14 abstained. The proposal thus reached the constitutional majority of 120 votes.
- 14 July 2021: Senate's Constitutional Committee endorsed the proposal and recommended its adoption.
- 14 July 2021: Senate's Committee for Foreign Affairs, Defense and Security endorsed the proposal and recommended its adoption. Seven members voted for adoption (Patrik Kunčar (KDU-ČSL), Jaroslav Zeman (SLK), Marek Ošťádal (STAN), Tomáš Czernin (TOP 09), Tomáš Jirsa (ODS), Ladislav Faktor (independent) a Jan Sobotka (independent for STAN)), two against (Pavel Fischer (independent) a Miroslav Balatka (independent for STAN))

On 21 July 2021, the Senate approved the amendment by the majority of 54 of 74 present, i.e. significantly more than the 45 votes necessary. 13 Senators voted against, 7 abstained. The bill was signed by the President on 3 August 2021 and published in the collection of laws on 13 August 2021 under No. 295/2021. It became effective on 1 October 2021.

=== 2021 Firearms Act amendment ===
The right to acquire, keep and bear firearm is guaranteed under conditions set by this law.

— Article 1 Subsection 1 of the Czech Firearms Act added in 2021.

The Czech Republic was bound to implement the 2017 EU Firearms Directive. Originally, it was considered unworkable with the existing Czech firearms act. The government took a decision to adopt a completely new firearms law, which would fulfill the EU requirements while preserving rights of the Czech citizens. As the works on an entirely new enactment stalled due to the COVID-19 pandemic, the Parliament then amended the existing 2002 Firearms Act, using many of the concepts developed for the intended new law in the mere amendment instead.

The 2021 amendment brought sweeping changes, which include a new permitting process for magazines with capacity of more than 10 (long guns) or 20 rounds (short guns), change in firearms classification, or duty to register new types of guns (e.g. gas pistols, flobert guns, etc.). Interpretation of the new changes is subject to a new introductory sentence in Article 1 Subsection 1 of the Firearms Act.

At the same time rules were eased in a number of ways. Mechanical weapons (crossbows, bows) and night vision scopes became completely unregulated. Silencers, hollow point and simunition ammo became available to gun license holders. Tasers, which were previously restricted, became available without gun license. A change in open carry rules positively affected biathlon and reenactment societies.

A new provision allowed Government to arrange concealed carry reciprocity with other EU Member States.

== 2021 Establishment of the Designated Reserves of the State ==
Designated Reserves

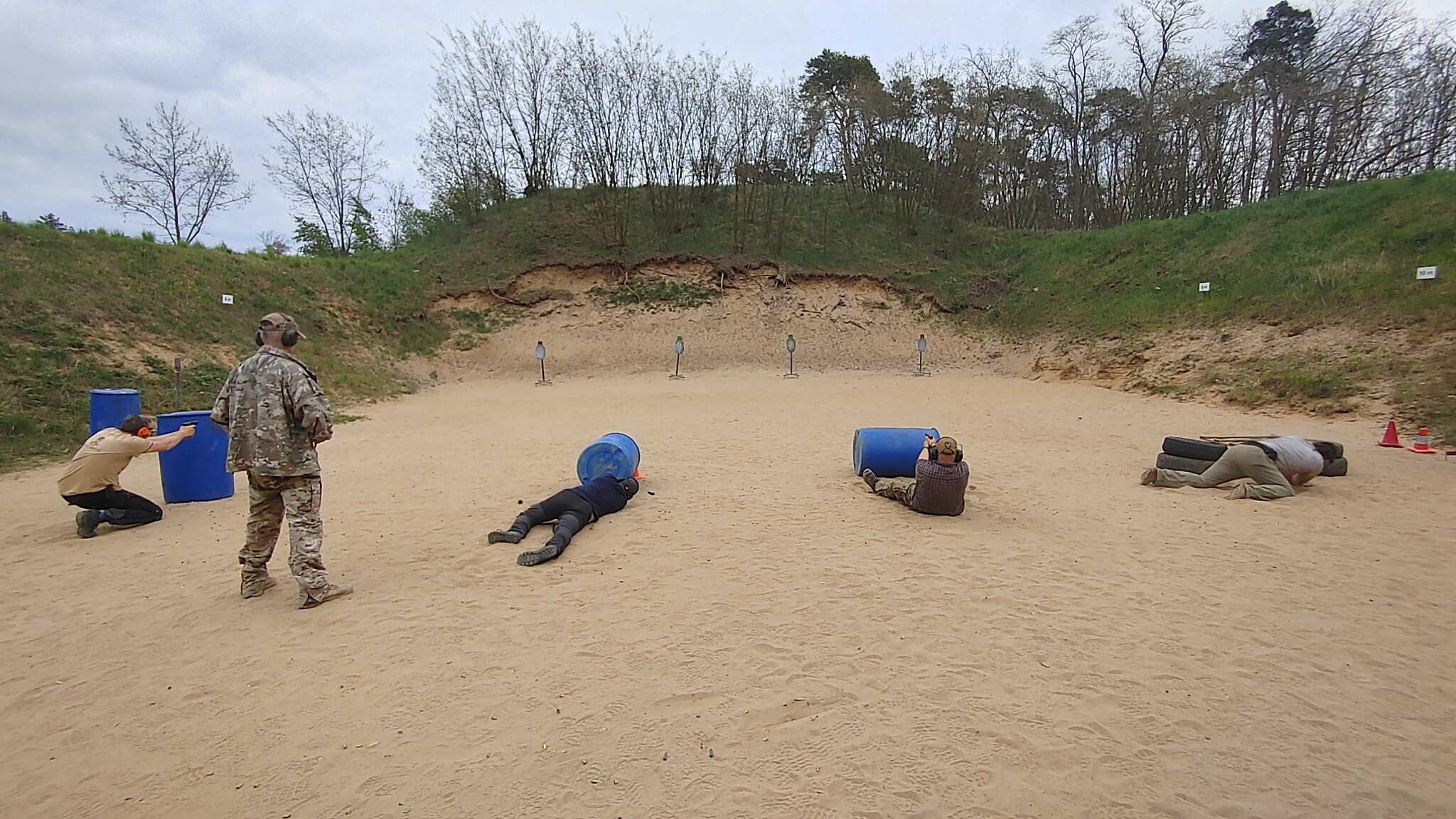
Level 1 training - shooting from concealment.

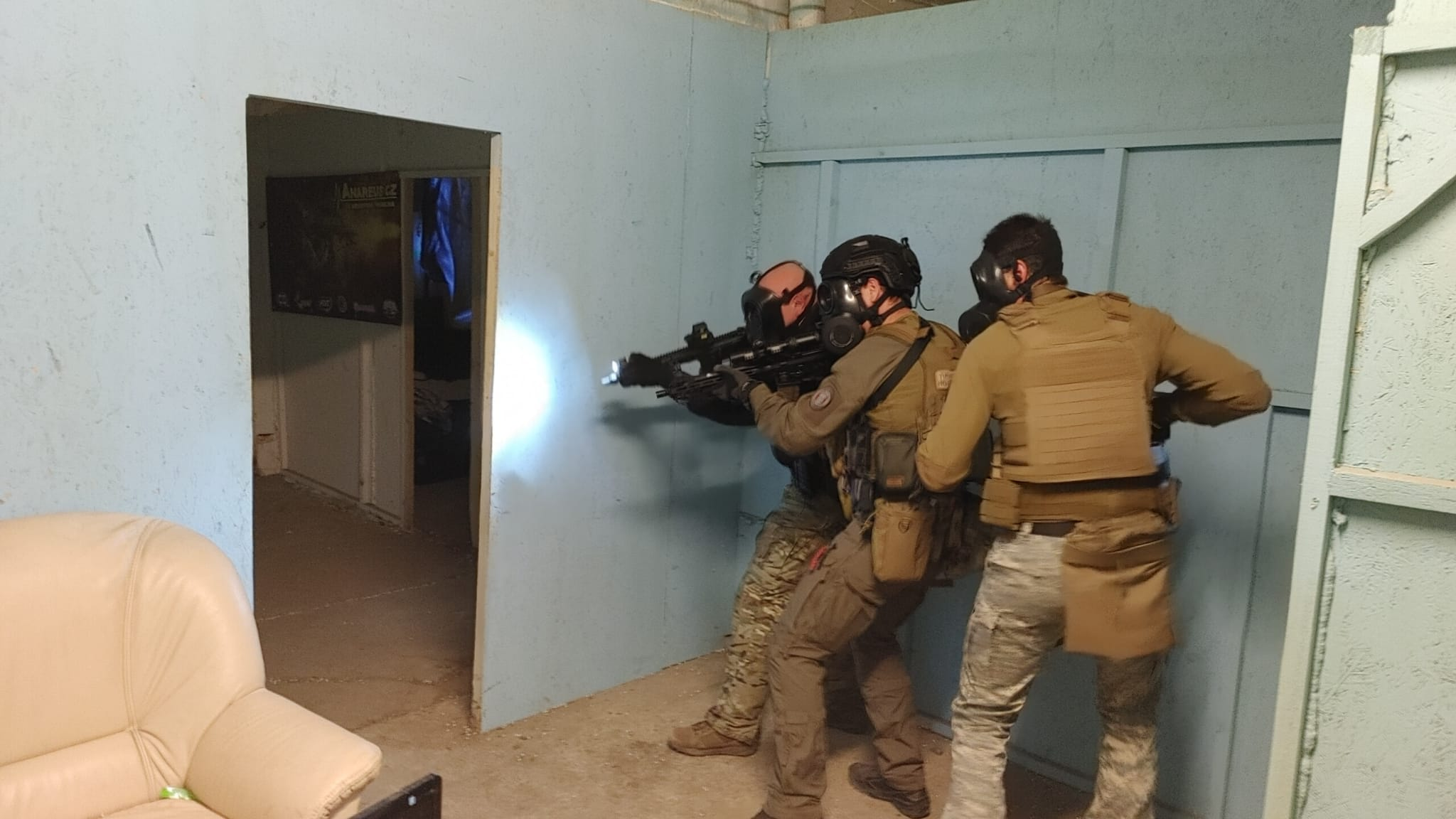
Level 3 training - teamwork elimination of active shooter (FX simmunition CQB combat).

Along with the 2021 Firearms Act Amendment, the Parliament passed also an Act No. 14/2021 Coll., on the handling of weapons in certain cases affecting the internal order or security of the Czech Republic. The Act's number 14/21 symbolically refers to the 600th anniversary of civilian firearms possession in the country. The legislation establishes "a system of firearms training, the purpose of which is to improve the knowledge, abilities and skills of persons authorised to handle firearms for the purpose of ensuring internal order or the security of the Czech Republic". Within the system, private companies approved by authorities provide advanced shooting training to firearm owners that have E (concealed carry) type of license. After passing a set of requirements and taking an oath, the participants become part of the Designated Reserve of the State, whereby they may be called up with their private firearms to support the work of police or armed forces in a crisis event. While the law anticipates founding of firearms training for both internal security as well as defense, as of 2023 only the former was in place.

== 2026 Comprehensive change of gun law ==
Firearms Act
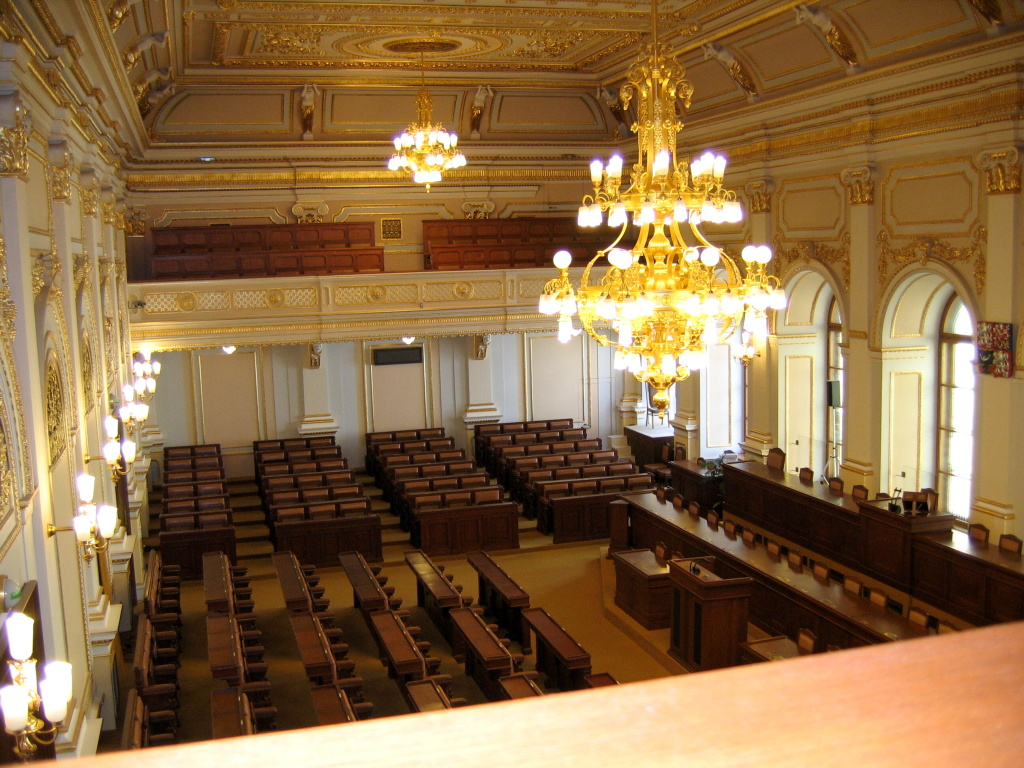

Parliament of the Czech Republic
- Long title: Act on Firearms and Ammunition
- Citation: No. 90/2024 Coll.
- Passed by: Chamber of Deputies
- Passed: 26 January 2024
- Passed by: Senate
- Passed: 6 March 2024
- Signed by: President Petr Pavel
- Signed: 22 March 2024
- Commenced: 1 January 2026

Legislative history

Initiating chamber: Chamber of Deputies
- Bill citation: Chamber Bill No. 465 (9th Legislature)
- Introduced by: Fiala Government; Represented by Vít Rakušan, Minister of the Interior
- Rapporteur: Petr Letocha
- Introduced: 5 June 2023
- Distributed to members: 5 June 2023
- Committee responsible: Security Committee
- First reading: 24 October 2023
- Second reading: 12 December 2023
- Third reading: 26 January 2024
- Voting summary: 151 voted for; None voted against; 18 abstained

Revising chamber: Senate
- Received from the Chamber of Deputies: 8 February 2024
- Rapporteur: Václav Láska
- Committee responsible: Foreign Affairs, Defence and Security Committee
- Passed: 6 March 2024
- Voting summary: 66 voted for; 1 voted against; 8 abstained

Repeals
- 2002 Firearms Act (No. 119/2002 Coll.)
- Status: In force

At the beginning of 2018, work on a completely new Firearms Act was started in order to properly implement the 2017 EU Firearms Directive. An expert workgroup was established at the Ministry of Interior that included also expert representatives of the general public. Preparation of the new legislation stalled during the COVID-19 pandemic, which led to implementation being done through the 2021 Amendment of the 2002 Firearms Act. The work on the new Firearms Act resumed later, and the law was passed in early 2024 in the Chamber of Deputies by majority of 151:0 and in the Senate by 66:1. It will come into force on 1 January 2026. The new legislation is significantly well organized than the 2002 Firearms Act, which had been amended 30 times. The most important practical change in the law is the move from licensing system, where licenses were subject to periodical renewal, to authorization system, where authorizations are granted for life. Also, instead of five types of licenses, the law will recognize only two classes of authorizations, non-carry and concealed carry. The legislation also moves towards electronic-only database system instead of previous physical licenses and gun registration cards.
