= Martin Dvořák =

Czech politician, diplomat, economist and publicist

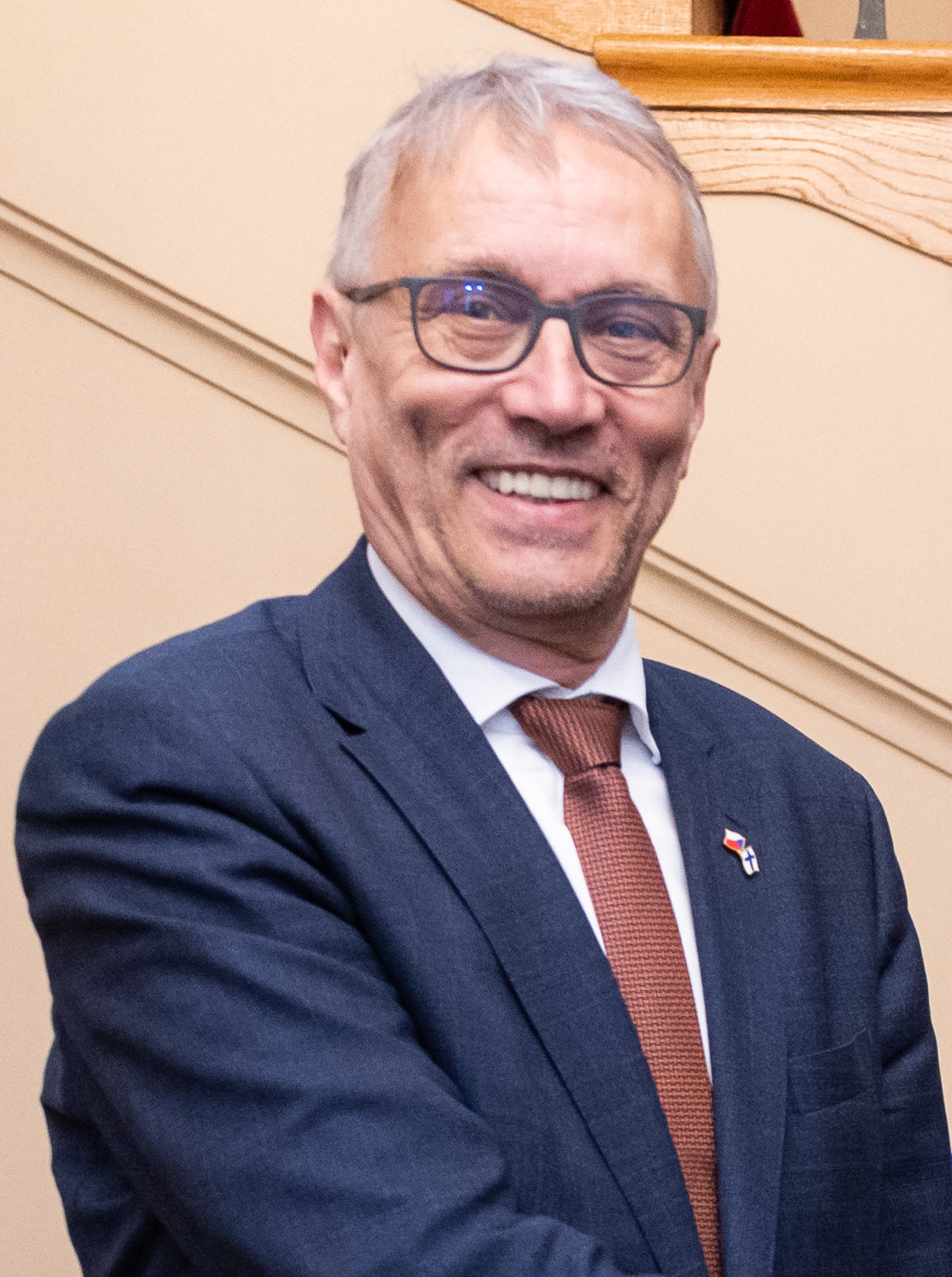
- Dvořák in 2024

5th Minister for European Affairs
- In office 4 May 2023 – 15 December 2025
- Prime Minister: Petr Fiala
- Preceded by: Mikuláš Bek

Deputy of Minister of Foreign Affairs
- In office 20 December 2021 – 4 May 2023

Leader of the Vote for the City
- In office 1998 – 10 February 2001
- Preceded by: Position established
- Succeeded by: Josef Malíř
- In office 29 March 2003 – 3 April 2004
- Preceded by: Josef Malíř
- Succeeded by: Josef Malíř

Mayor of Hradec Králové
- In office 1990 – 1 September 1998
- Preceded by: Josef Potoček
- Succeeded by: Jan Doskočil

Member of the Hradec Králové City Assembly
- In office 24 November 1990 – 21 October 2006
- In office 16 October 2010 – 12 December 2012

Personal details
- Born: 11 November 1956 (age 69) Prague, Czechoslovakia
- Party: Civic Forum; ODA (1994–1998); Vote for the City (1998–2021); STAN (2021–)
- Education: Prague University of Economics and Business

Martin Dvořák (born 11 November 1956) is a Czech politician, diplomat, economist, and publicist who served as Minister of European Affairs in the Cabinet of Petr Fiala from 2023 to 2025. Dvořák co-founded the Civic Forum in Hradec Králové in 1989. In 1990–1998, he was the mayor of Hradec Králové. He also participated in UN-missions in Kosovo and Iraq. He worked for the Ministry of Foreign Affairs on various position before he became the Minister for European Affairs.

== Life ==
=== Early life and education ===
Dvořák was born on born 11 November 1956 in Prague. He graduated at gymnasium in Pardubice. He holds a master's degree (Ing.) in finance from the Prague University of Economics and Business.

=== Era of Communist rule ===
Martin Dvořák was persecuted by the Communist regime for his performance during the Palach's week. He was moved to a production position at an abattoir.

== Political views ==
Dvořák emphasizes the positive role of Euro and advocates for greater European integration. He is a member of Mayors and Independents. Martin Dvořák is also known for his support of a wider usage of the short name Czechia.

=== Racist Remarks on Palestinians ===
In October 2024, Dvořák stated during a Czech Television debate that "not all Palestinians are Hamas members, but all Palestinians, from early childhood, are raised in hatred of Israel, and hatred of everything Israeli is part of their genetic makeup".

Three members of the Palestinian community in the Czech Republic subsequently brought a legal action against the state. In June 2026, the Prague 1 District Court ruled that the Czech Ministry of Foreign Affairs must apologise to the plaintiffs for Dvořák's statement. The court found that the remark concerned Palestinians as a group and constituted a discriminatory statement. According to the judgment, the statement served as a justification for attacks on Palestinians, including civilians and children, and was described as "completely unacceptable" in a democratic society governed by the Charter of Fundamental Rights and Freedoms.

The case attracted public attention and criticism from academics and human-rights advocates, who argued that the remarks contributed to the dehumanisation of Palestinians and normalised racist stereotypes in public debate.
