= Vladimír Balaš =

Czech politician and lawyer

Vladimír Balaš MP
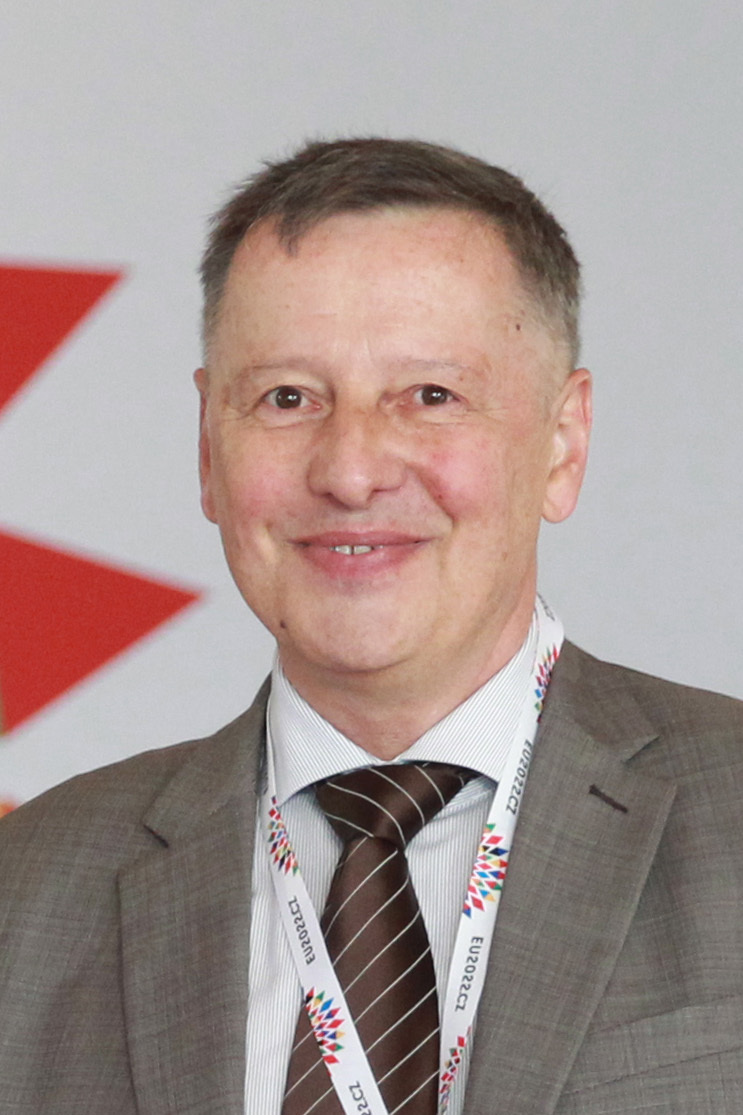
- Balaš in 2022

18th Minister of Education, Youth and Sports
- In office 29 June 2022 – 4 May 2023
- Prime Minister: Petr Fiala
- Preceded by: Petr Gazdík
- Succeeded by: Mikuláš Bek

Member of the Chamber of Deputies
- Incumbent
- Assumed office 9 October 2021

Personal details
- Born: 20 April 1959 (age 67) Prostějov, Czechoslovakia (now Czech Republic)
- Party: Mayors and Independents (2014–present)
- Other political affiliations: Pirates and Mayors (2020–present)
- Education: Charles University
- Profession: Lawyer, University teacher

Vladimír Balaš (born 20 April 1959) is a Czech politician, lawyer and university teacher. From July 2022 to May 2023, he served as the Minister of Education, Youth and Sports of the Czech Republic in the Cabinet of Petr Fiala.
