= Mikuláš Bek =

Czech teacher, musicologist and rector of Masaryk University

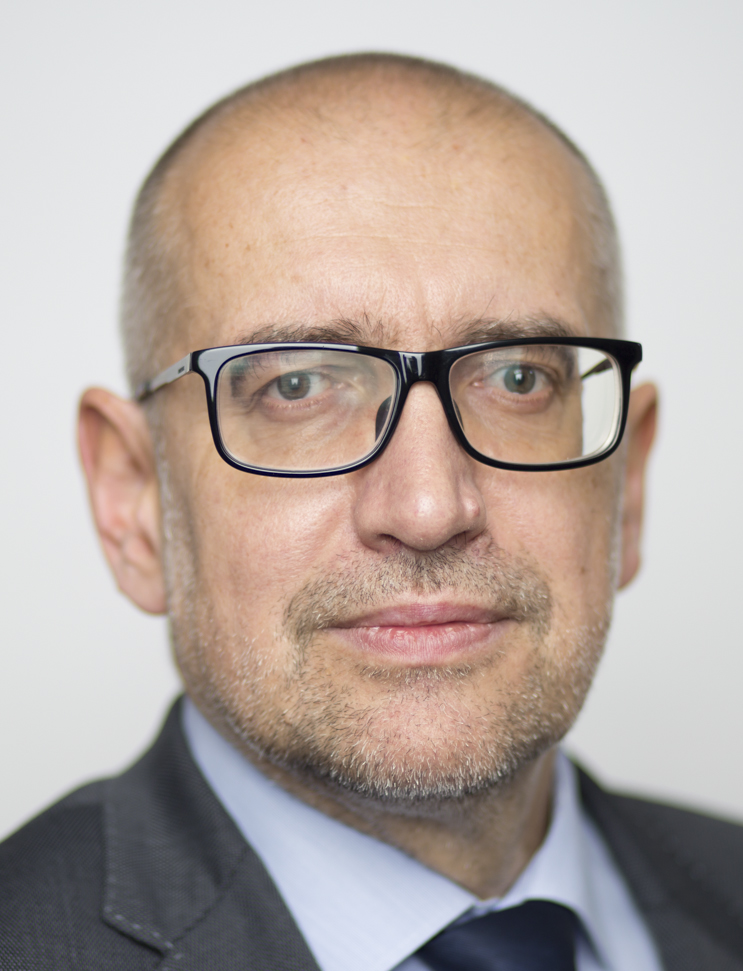
- Bek in 2019

19th Minister of Education, Youth and Sports
- In office 4 May 2023 – 15 December 2025
- Prime Minister: Petr Fiala
- Preceded by: Vladimír Balaš
- Succeeded by: Robert Plaga

4th Minister for European Affairs
- In office 17 December 2021 – 4 May 2023
- Prime Minister: Petr Fiala
- Preceded by: Juraj Chmiel (2010)
- Succeeded by: Martin Dvořák

Senator from Brno
- In office 13 October 2018 – 13 October 2024
- Preceded by: Eliška Wagnerová
- Succeeded by: Břetislav Rychlík

Personal details
- Born: 22 April 1964 (age 62) Šternberk, Czechoslovakia (now Czech Republic)
- Party: Independent (nominated by Mayors and Independents)
- Education: Masaryk University; Charles University in Prague
- Occupation: musicologist
- Website: mikulasbek.cz

Mikuláš Bek (born 22 April 1964) is a Czech musicologist and politician, who served as Minister of Education, Youth and Sports in the cabinet of Petr Fiala from May 2023 to December 2025. He previously served as the Minister of EU Affairs from December 2021 to May 2023.

== Early career ==
From 2011 to 2019 he served as rector of Masaryk University in Brno, succeeding his friend and future cabinet superior Petr Fiala.

== Political career ==
From 2018 to 2024 Bek had been a member of the Czech Senate representing the Brno-City electoral district, as a nominee of the Mayors and Independents. In the Senate, he chaired the Committee on EU Affairs. In November 2021, he stated that the Visegrád Group is overrated and that he wants to focus on cooperation with Germany and the Western European countries.

Academic offices
| Preceded by Petr Fiala | Rector of Masaryk University; 2011–2019 | Succeeded by Martin Bareš |
