= Richard Salzmann =

Czech politician (1929–2023)

Member of the Senate of the Czech Republic
- In office 23 November 1996 – 23 November 2000
- Preceded by: position established
- Succeeded by: Milan Šimonovský
- Constituency: Brno-město

Personal details
- Born: 10 May 1929 Plzeň, Czechoslovakia
- Died: 2 October 2023 (aged 94)
- Party: ODS
- Education: Charles University
- Occupation: Lawyer

Richard Salzmann (10 May 1929 – 2 October 2023) was a Czech lawyer and politician. A member of the Civic Democratic Party, he served in the Senate from 1996 to 2000.

Salzmann died on 2 October 2023, at the age of 94.
