= Eliška Wagnerová =

Czech judge and politician (1948–2025)

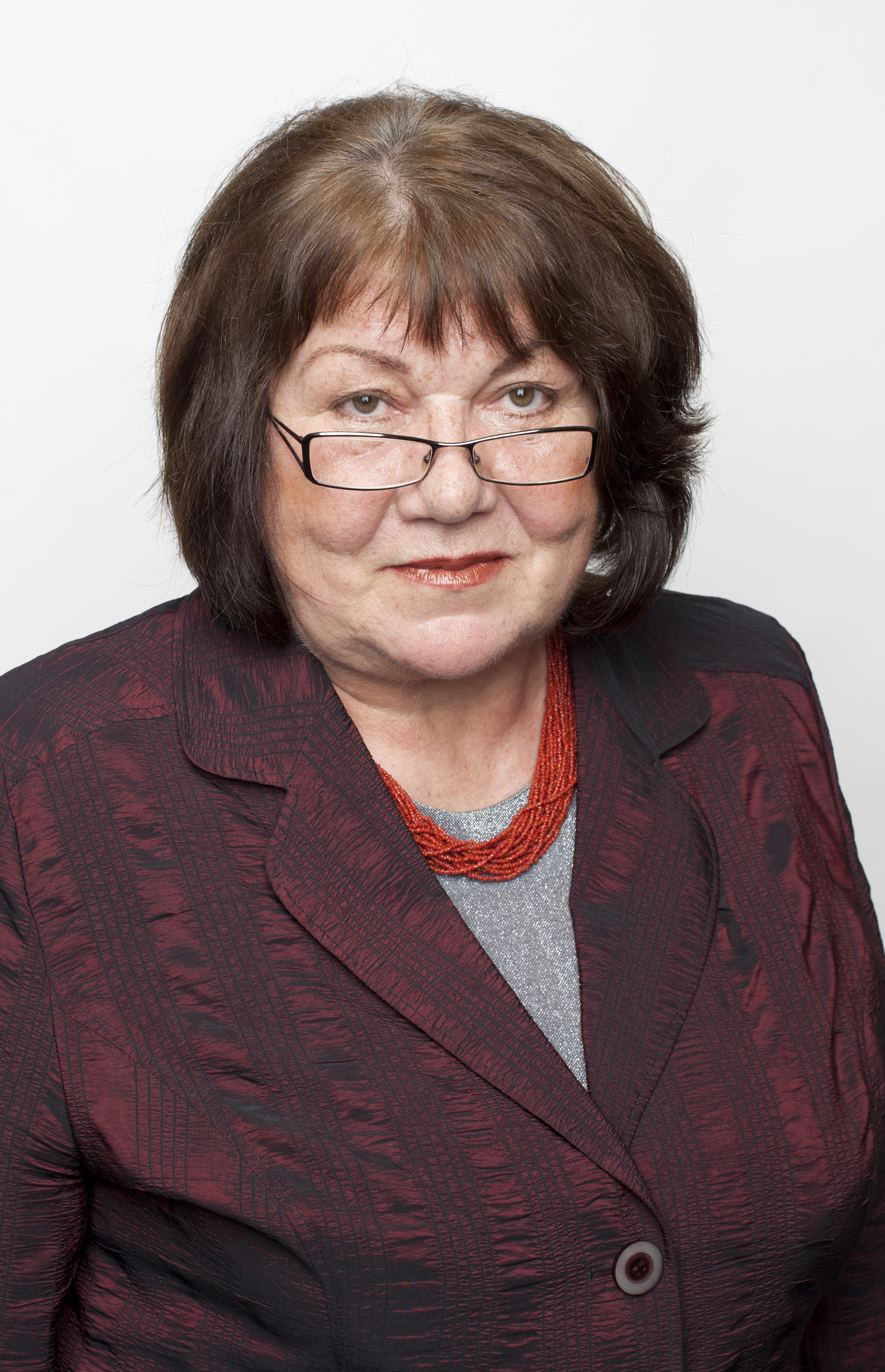
- Wagnerová in 2012

Member of the Senate of the Czech Republic for Brno-City
- In office 20 October 2012 – 20 October 2018
- Preceded by: Richard Svoboda
- Succeeded by: Mikuláš Bek

President of the Supreme Court of the Czech Republic
- In office 22 July 1998 – 20 March 2002
- Preceded by: Otakar Motejl
- Succeeded by: Iva Brožová

Personal details
- Born: 7 September 1948 Kladno, Czechoslovakia
- Died: 18 January 2025 (aged 76) Czech Republic
- Party: SZ
- Education: Masaryk University; Charles University
- Occupation: Lawyer; Judge

Eliška Wagnerová (7 September 1948 – 18 January 2025) was a Czech judge and politician. A member of the Green Party, she served as president of the Supreme Court from 1998 to 2002. From 2002 to 2012, she served on the Constitutional court, as its vice-president. She was later a Senator from 2012 to 2018. Wagnerová died on 18 January 2025 at the age of 76.

In 2026, Wagnerová was posthumously awarded the Order of Tomáš Garrigue Masaryk III. class
