= Břetislav Rychlík =

Czech actor (born 1958)

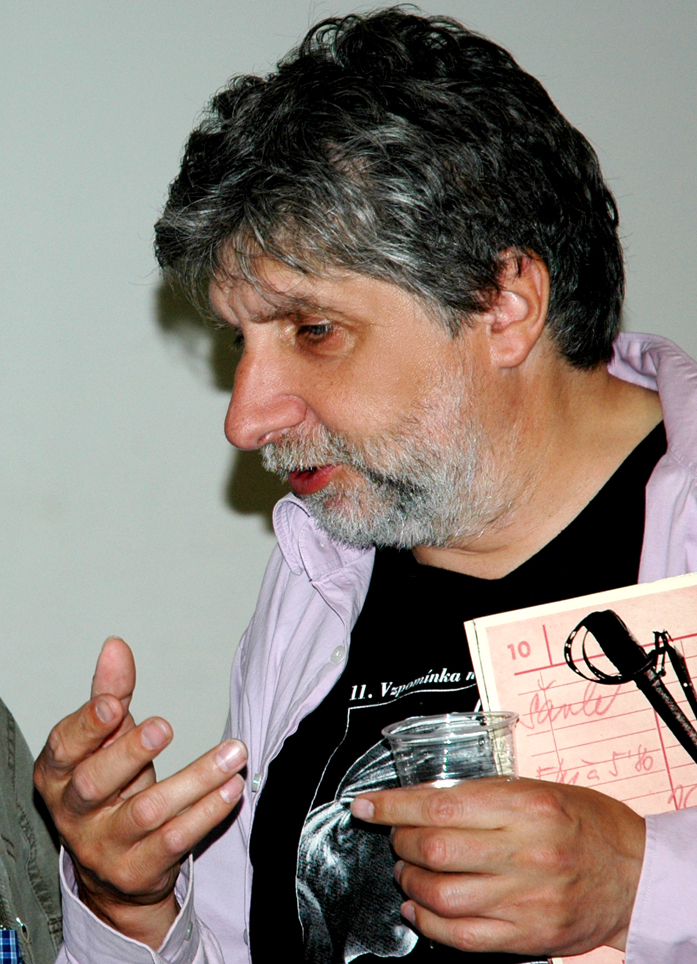
- Rychlík in 2012
- Born: 23 July 1958 (age 67); Uherské Hradiště, Czechoslovakia
- Occupation(s): Actor, director
- Years active: 1982–present
- Spouse: Monika Rychlíková
- Children: 2

Břetislav Rychlík (born 23 July 1958) is a Czech actor and director. He was born in Uherské Hradiště and began his career at the local theater. Later he worked in the theater in Brno and also taught at Janáček Academy of Music and Performing Arts. He also directed several documentary films.

== Filmography ==
- Quiet Happiness (1985)
- Pětka s hvězdičkou (1985)
- Vojtěch, řečený sirotek (1989)
- Pražákům, těm je hej (1990)
- The Inheritance or Fuckoffguysgoodday (1992)
- Ani smrt nebere... (1996)
- Dědictví aneb Kurva se neříká (2014)
