= Ivo Kraus =

Czech physicist (born 1936)

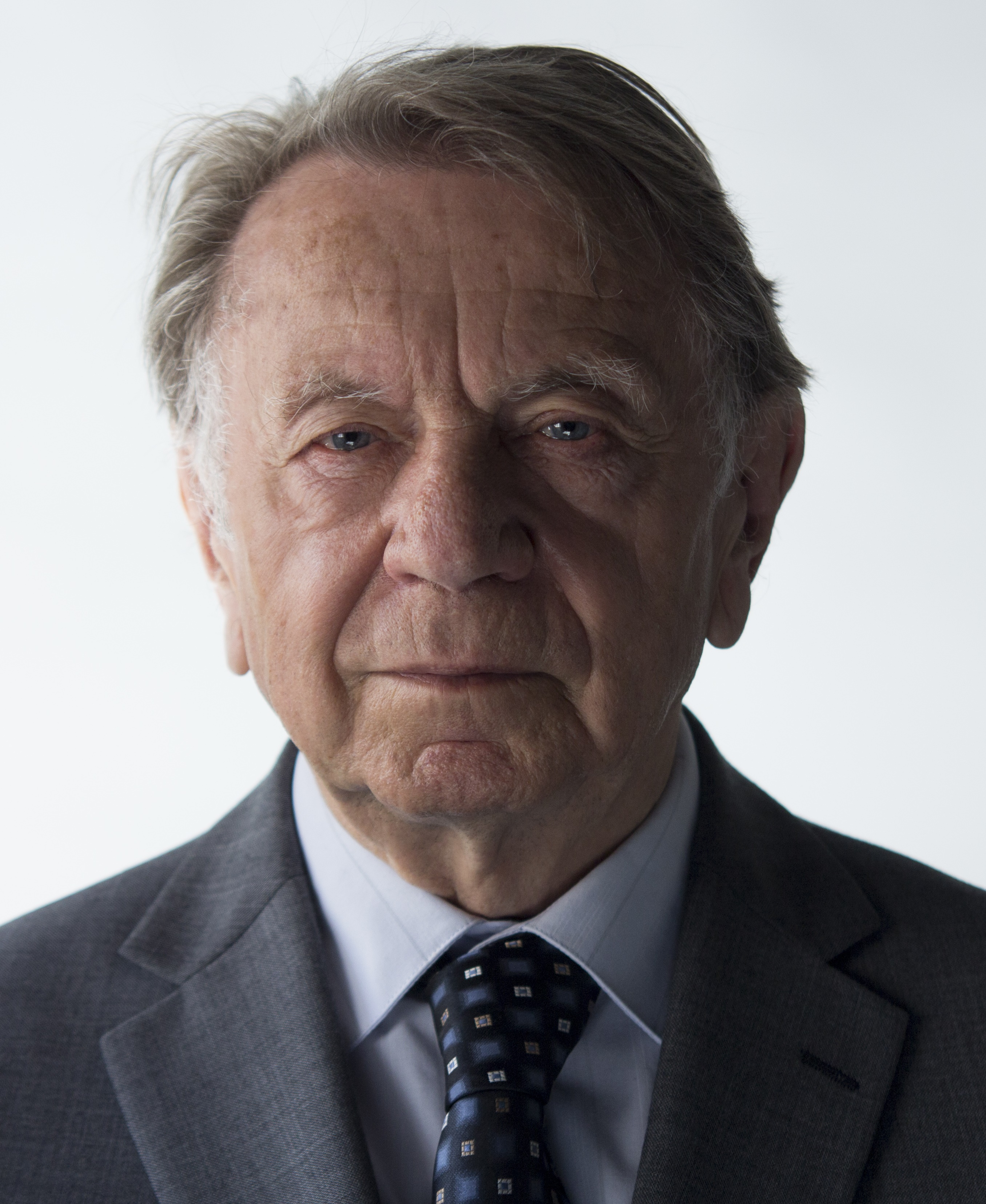
- Born: 29 January 1936 (age 90); Náchod, Czechoslovakia
- Education: Charles University
- Known for: Solid-state physicist, university professor, communicator of science and technology, author

Ivo Kraus (born 29 January 1936) is a Czech experimental physicist, university professor and author. Focusing on solid-state physics, he is a professor of physics at Czech Technical University in Prague, communicator of science and technology, and author of several dozen books on physics and its history.

== Education and career ==
Born in Náchod in Czechoslovakia (now the Czech Republic), he graduated from the grammar school in Nová Paka (1954), then he attended the Faculty of Mathematics and Physics of Charles University, majoring in physics, specialized in nuclear physics. Since 1959 his career has been firmly associated with the Czech Technical University in Prague (CTU), namely its former Faculty of Technical and Nuclear Physics, at present its Faculty of Nuclear Sciences and Physical Engineering), where he was an assistant (1959 to 1962), a senior assistant (1962 to1973) and an associate professor of experimental physics (1973 to 1991). Since 1991 he has been a professor in the field of condensed matter physics and acoustics. From 1980 to 1992 he also headed the Department of Solid-State Engineering at the Faculty of Nuclear Sciences and Physical Engineering.

In the physics of solid materials, he specialized in the use of X-ray diffraction to diagnose residual stress in technical materials. His doctoral thesis focused on this very field of science – it was entitled The Study of the Structure of Sintered Tungsten Carbides Using X-ray Measurements of Internal Stresses, supervised by professor Adéla Kochanovská. His postdoctoral thesis qualifying him as a university lecturer (i.e. “habilitation thesis”) was devoted to the Application of X-ray Stress Measurements in Pressed Pieces Made of Metal Powders. To obtain his Doctor of Science (DSc) degree, he submitted his thesis on X-rays in Inhomogeneous Stress Fields. The theory and application of X-ray stress measurement was the topic of the vast majority of articles published by himself or with collaborators in both domestic and foreign professional journals, conference proceedings, Czech monographs, as well as separate chapters in the Defect and Microstructure Analysis by Diffraction and Industrial Applications of X-ray Diffraction publications.

He has been teaching students in the bachelor, master and doctoral study programs at the Faculty of Nuclear Sciences and Physical Engineering of the CTU in the courses of Introduction to Solid-State Physics, Structure and Properties of Crystals, Physics of Metals, Diffraction Analysis of Mechanical Stress and Construction of Solid Materials. He was also a supervisor of 7 PhD students.

In addition to his pedagogical activities at the Czech Technical University, he gave regular lectures for both experts and the general public about the history of physics and technology (within the Lifelong Learning programs and the so-called University of the Third Age etc.).

He chaired and was a fellow of numerous expert and evaluation committees and boards including those responsible for subjects and final state exams in Bachelor, Master and Doctoral Study Programs, as well as the CTU Grant Agency, The Development Fund for Higher Education Institutions of the Czech Ministry of Education, Youth and Sports, the Czech Science Foundation (GAČR), the Jury of Magnesia Litera book award, editorial boards of the Academia publishing house, numerous journals including Prague Technology, Mathematical and Physical Reviews, Biographic Dictionary of the Czech Lands, History of Science and Technology, Siberian Journal of Science and Technology. He was a member of the CTU Scientific Council, the Scientific Council of the National Technical Museum as well as the council of the National Library of Technology, the CTU Committee for the Ethics of Research Activities. He accomplished dozens of study and lecture stays and tours in Poland (National Centre for Nuclear Research, Świerk), in Germany (Westsächsische Hochschule Zwickau) and in Russia (Siberian State Aerospace University in Krasnoyarsk, Peter the Great St. Petersburg Polytechnic University, Novosibirsk State Technical University, North-Eastern Federal University in Yakutsk).

== Selected works ==
He has published more than seven hundred scientific, professional, travel and non-fiction articles as well as a number of textbooks and specialized books on solid-state physics and the history of sciences.

- Introduction to X-ray Structure Analysis (1985)
- X-ray Stress Analysis (with Trofimov, V. V., 1989)
- X-ray Diffraction Analysis of Inhomogeneous Stress Fields (1990)
- Structure and Properties of Crystals (1993)
- Wilhelm Conrad Roentgen – Heir to the Happy Coincidence (1997),
- The History of European Discoveries and Inventions (2001)
- The History of Technical Sciences and Inventions in the Czech Lands (2004)
- Technical Application of Diffraction Analysis (with Ganev, N., 2004)
- The Tales of Learned Women (2005)
- Physics in the Cultural History of Europe I–V (2006–2010)
- Surfaces and Interfaces (with Fiala, J., 2009, 2nd edition 2016, 2017, 3rd edition 2023)
- Elementary Physics of Solid Materials (with Fiala, J., 2011, 2013, 2nd edition 2016, 2017, 3rd edition 2022)
- Electronic Structure and the Reactivity of Surfaces and Interfaces (with Frank, H. and Fiala, J., 2013, 2nd edition 2018)
- Honorary Doctors at Czech Technical University in Prague (with Kučerová, V., 2014, 2nd edition 2022)
- Women in the History of Mathematics, Physics and Astronomy (2015, 2017)
- Physics during the First Republic (with Zajac, Š., 2017)
- Science in the Czech Lands (Ivo Kraus et al., 2019)
- Physics. The Encyclopedia of Great Discoveries and Personalities (2020)
- Czech and Slovak Physics 1945–2005 (with Zajac, Š., 2020)
- Crystallography (with Fiala, J., 2021)
- Women Talented in Technology and Their Inventions (2023)
- Czech Imprint in the History of Physics (2025)
- A series of thirteen features entitled Stories of Learned Women, five features on the traditions of Austrian physics within the cycle of The Austrian Year and a five-part cycle of Ivo Kraus´s Life Story contributed to the Vltava broadcasting station of the Czech Radio.

== Selected awards and recognition ==
- Foreign Fellow of the Academy of Engineering of the Russian Federation (1991)
- Fellow of the Engineering Academy of the Czech Republic (FEng, 1996)
- Fellow of the St. Petersburg Academy of Sciences for Strength Problems (1996)
- Member of New York Academy of Sciences (1997)
- Fellow of International Higher Education Academy of Sciences (1998)
- The Bolzano Medal of the Society for the History of Sciences and Technology (2005)
- The Vojtěch Náprstek Honorary Medal for Merit in Science Popularization of the Czech Academy of Sciences (2005)
- The Felber Medal of the Czech Technical University in the 1st degree (2006)
- Honorary Fellow of the Czech and Slovak Crystallographic Association (2006)
- The CTU Rector's Award for prestigious Publications (2009, 2013)
- Honorary Fellow of the Union of Czech Mathematicians and Physicist (2018)
