= Senate district 17 – Prague 12 =

Electoral district in the Czech Republic

Coordinates: 49°59′21″N 14°26′49″E

17 – Prague 12
- inline Senate district of the Czech Republic

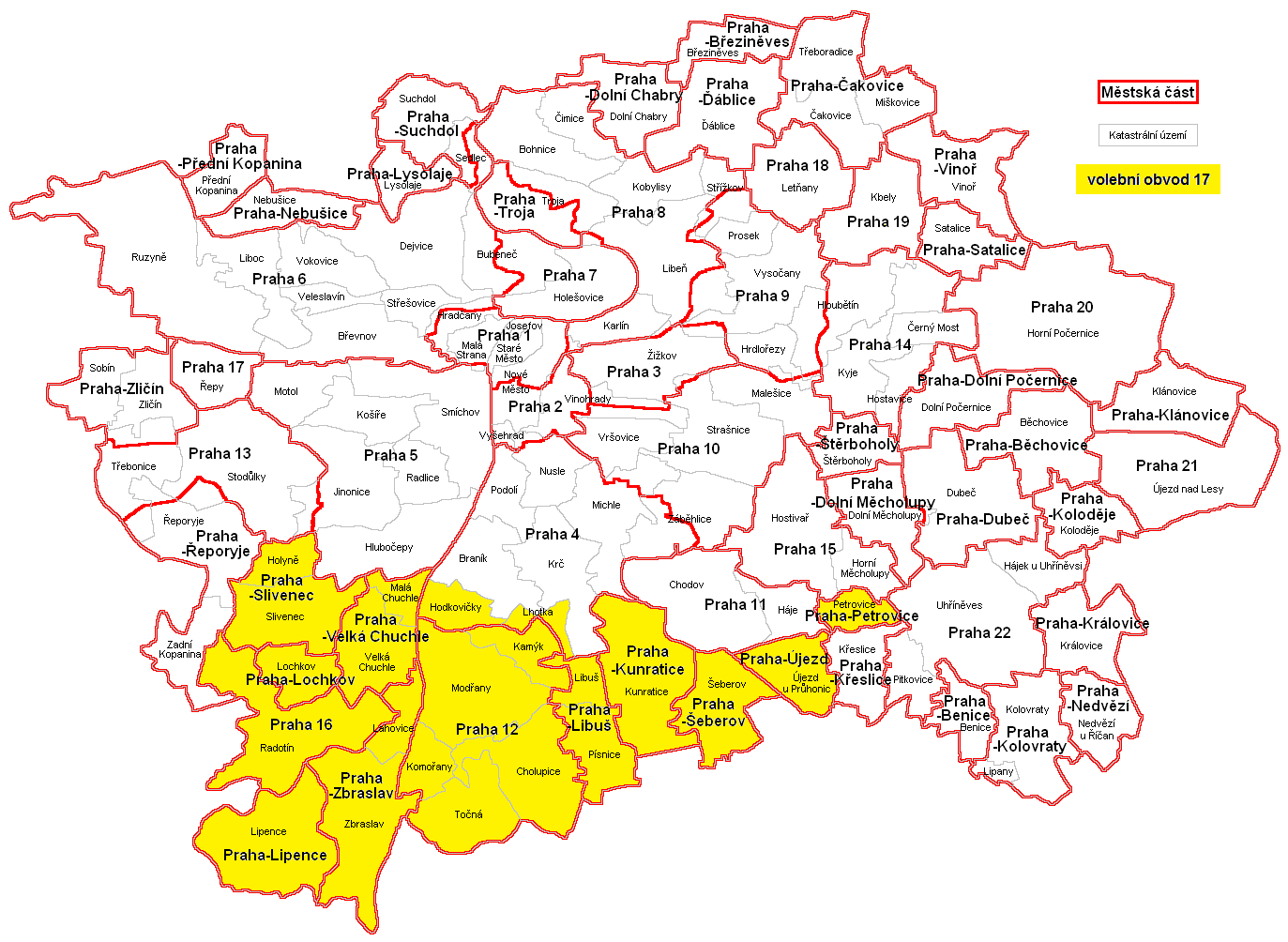
- Senator: Pavel Fischer; KDU-ČSL, ODS, STAN, TOP 09
- Region: Capital City of Prague
- District: Prague
- Electorate: 91334
- Area: 86.39 km²
- Last election: 2024
- Next election: 2030

Senate district 17 – Prague 12 is an electoral district of the Senate of the Czech Republic, which is entirely located in the Capital City of Prague. Since 2018, former presidential candidate and head of the Foreign Affairs committee, Pavel Fischer, is representing the district as an independent.

== Senators ==
Year	Senator	Party
1996 (Note: Election for shortened four-year term)	Jan Krámek	ODS
2000	Edvard Outrata	4KOALICE
2006	Tomáš Grulich	ODS
2012	Tomáš Grulich	ODS
2018	Pavel Fischer	Independent
2024	Pavel Fischer	KDU-ČSL, ODS, STAN, TOP 09

== Election results ==
=== 1996 ===
1996 Czech Senate election in Prague 12
Candidate	Party	1st round		2nd round	
Candidate	Party	Votes	%	Votes	%
Jan Krámek	ODS	18 671	48,65	24 511	68,75
Zdeněk Pleskot	ČSSD	5 907	15,39	11 141	31,25
Jan Sokol	KDU-ČSL	4 943	12,88	—	—
Milan Richter	KSČM	3 688	9,61	—	—
Vladimír Janský	ODA	3 565	9,29	—	—
Přibyslava Tichotová	DEU	1 142	2,98	—	—
Jiří Machač	KAN	459	1,20	—	—

=== 2000 ===
2000 Czech Senate election in Prague 12
Candidate	Party	1st round		2nd round	
Candidate	Party	Votes	%	Votes	%
Edvard Outrata	4KOALICE	7 478	24,17	12 659	62,25
Jan Krámek	ODS	6 843	22,12	7 676	37,74
Radim Uzel	ČSNS	6 223	20,11	—	—
Kateřina Besserová	Independent	4 681	15,13	—	—
Libuše Eliášová	KSČM	3 772	12,19	—	—
Otto Kechner	ČSSD	1 934	6,25	—	—

=== 2006 ===
2006 Czech Senate election in Prague 12
Candidate	Party	1st round		2nd round	
Candidate	Party	Votes	%	Votes	%
Tomáš Grulich	ODS	17 429	47,37	13 364	62,42
Pavel Klener	SZ	4 721	12,83	8 044	37,57
Květoslava Kořínková	ČSSD	4 508	12,25	—	—
Petr Šimůnek	KSČM	3 104	8,43	—	—
Svatopluk Karásek	US-DEU	2 922	7,94	—	—
Daniela Rázková	KDU-ČSL	1 891	5,13	—	—
Mirka Čejková	„21“	1 490	4,05	—	—
Petr Hannig	SZR	529	1,43	—	—
Václav Truhlář	ČP	196	0,53	—	—

=== 2012 ===
2012 Czech Senate election in Prague 12
Candidate	Party	1st round		2nd round	
Candidate	Party	Votes	%	Votes	%
Tomáš Grulich	ODS	5 284	20,02	12 416	61,29
František Adámek	ČSSD	4 574	17,33	7 841	38,7
Petr Šimůnek	KSČM	3 781	14,33	—	—
Ivan Gabal	KDU-ČSL, SZ	3 710	14,06	—	—
Jaroslav Vondráček	TOP 09, STAN	3 205	12,14	—	—
Miloslav Bednář	Svobodní	1 821	6,9	—	—
Karel Kasal	SD-SN	1 814	6,87	—	—
Vít Olmer	VV	1 118	4,23	—	—
Silvia Weiszová	Suverenity	671	2,54	—	—
Valentin Papazian	PP	407	1,54	—	—

=== 2018 ===
2018 Czech Senate election in Prague 12
Candidate	Party	1st round		2nd round	
Candidate	Party	Votes	%	Votes	%
Pavel Fischer	Independent	20 342	47,98	14 919	78,08
Eva Tylová	Pirates, LES	6 828	16,10	4 188	21,91
Ivan Pilný	ANO 2011	5 304	12,51	—	—
Aleš Gerloch	Independent	3 832	9,04	—	—
Ivan David	SPD	2 318	5,46	—	—
Marta Semelová	KSČM	1 685	3,97	—	—
Jiří Nouza	HPP	1 147	2,70	—	—
František Dobšík	ČSSD	933	2,20	—	—

=== 2024 ===
2024 Czech Senate election in Prague 12
Candidate	Party	1st round	
Candidate	Party	Votes	%
Pavel Fischer	KDU-ČSL, ODS, STAN, TOP 09	15 638	53,63
Boris Šťastný	ANO 2011, AUTO	7 664	26,28
Eva Tylová	Pirates, LES	3 651	12,52
Milan Urban	SPD	1 270	4,35
Petr Hůla	SOCDEM	562	1,92
Pynelopi Cimprichová	Swiss Democracy	371	1,27
