= Marcel Chládek =

Czech politician

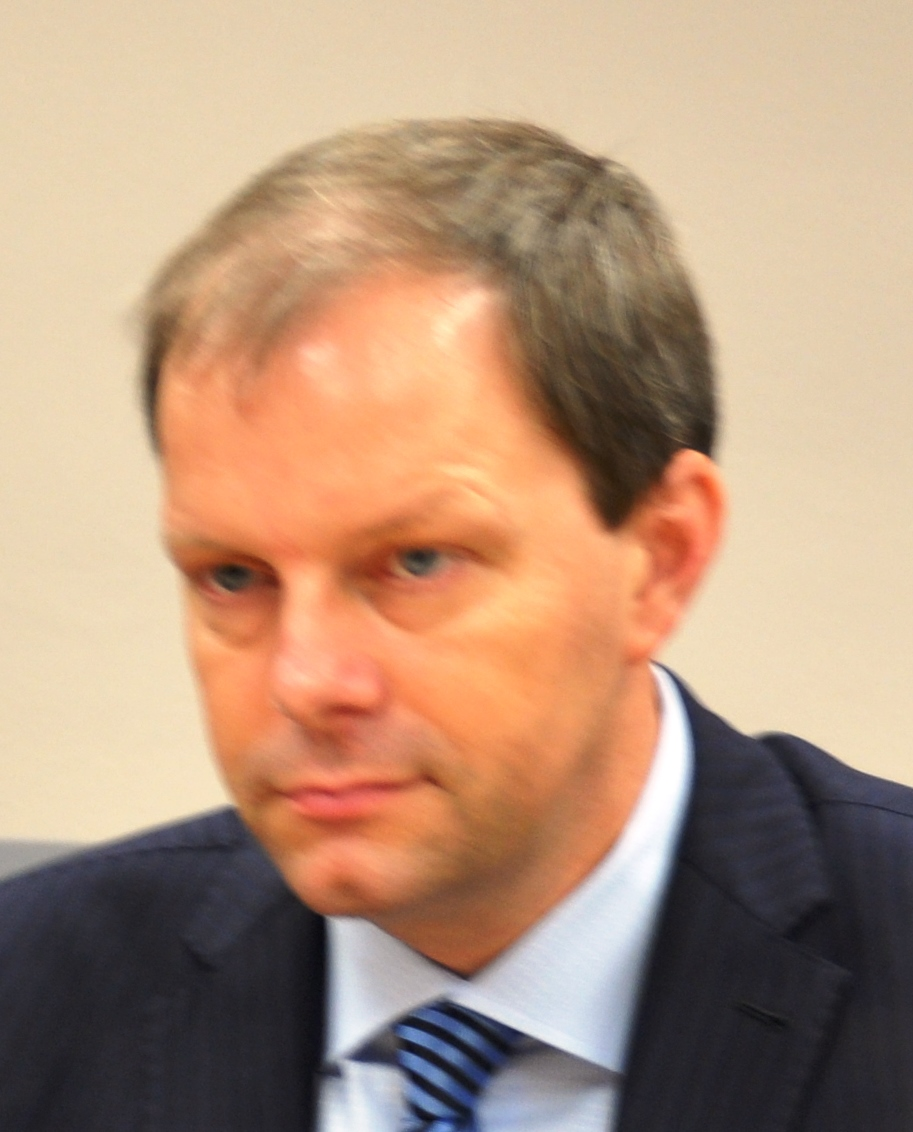

Minister of Education, Youth and Sports of the Czech Republic
- In office 29 January 2014 – 5 June 2015
- Prime Minister: Bohuslav Sobotka
- Preceded by: Dalibor Štys
- Succeeded by: Kateřina Valachová

Personal details
- Born: 9 April 1968 (age 58) Rakovník, Czechoslovakia
- Party: ČSSD
- Education: Faculty of Arts, Charles University in Prague

Marcel Chládek (born 9 April 1968) is a Czech social-democratic politician and former senator for Louny (2008 until 2014). He served as Minister of Education, Youth and Sports of the Czech Republic from 29 January 2014 until 6 June 2015.
