= Václav Žák =

Czech politician (1945–2025)

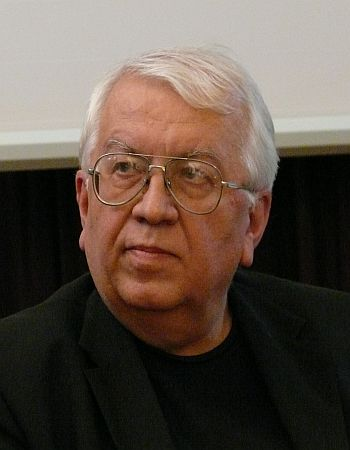
- Žák in 2014

Member of the Czech National Council
- In office 7 June 1990 – 4 June 1992

Personal details
- Born: 28 July 1945 Tábor, Czechoslovakia
- Died: 14 September 2025 (aged 80) Český Brod, Czech Republic
- Party: Civic Forum; Civic Movement
- Education: Faculty of Nuclear Sciences and Physical Engineering CTU in Prague
- Occupation: Politician, publicist

Václav Žák (28 July 1945 – 14 September 2025) was a Czech politician and publicist. He was a member of the Czech National Council (1990–1992) and signatory of Charter 77.

== Life and career ==
Žák was born in Tábor on 28 July 1945. He graduated from the Faculty of Technical and Nuclear Physics of the Czech Technical University in 1967 and after a study stay in England, he worked as a programmer at the Research Institute of Mathematical Machines in Prague. In 1977 he signed Charter 77 and participated in various dissident enterprises, he participated in the establishment of the Circle of Independent Intelligentsia and the Civic Forum. In 1990, he became the director of the Department of Informatization at the Ministry of Education and participated in the establishment of the university computer network. In June 1990, he was elected a member of the Czech National Council for the Civic Forum and then a vice-chairman of the Czech National Council. After the dissolution of the Civic Forum, he was a member of the Civic Movement and from 1992 he worked as an editor and publicist in magazines of the Ekonom publishing house, on the radio, etc. He also lectured on political theory at Charles University in Prague and at the University of Hradec Králové. From 2002 he was the editor-in-chief of the magazine Listy. From 2003 to 2009, he was a member of the Radio and Television Broadcasting Council and from 2006 to 2009 its chairman.

Žák died on 14 September 2025, at the age of 80.
