= 2017 Mayors and Independents leadership election =

- 25 March 2017
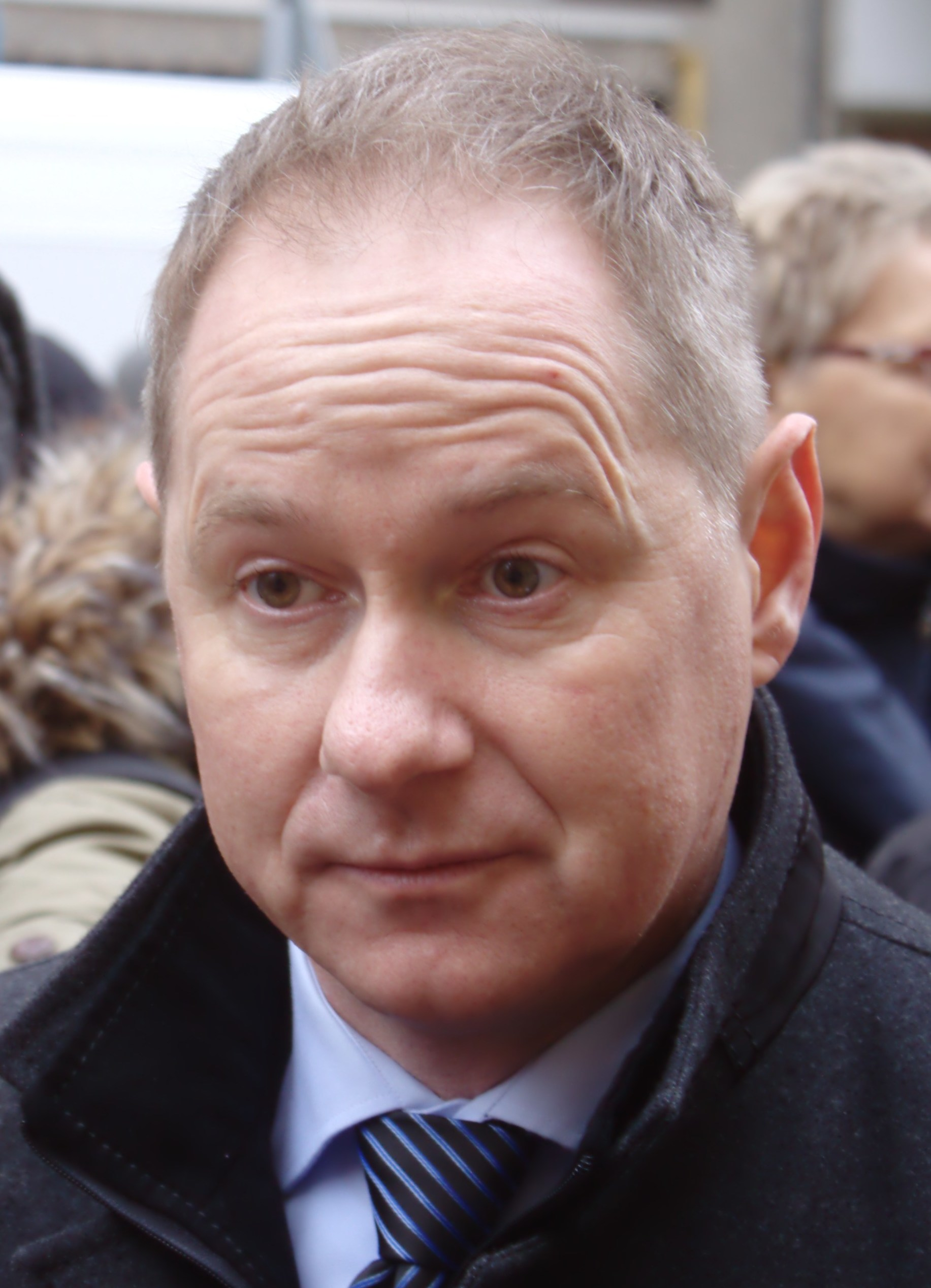
Candidate	Petr Gazdík
Electoral vote	135
Percentage	93%
leader of STAN before election
Petr Gazdík
Elected leader of STAN
Petr Gazdík

A leadership election for the Mayors and Independents (STAN) in 2017 was held on 25 March 2017. The incumbent leader Petr Gazdík was the only candidate. Gazdík received 135 of 145 votes and was elected for another term.
