= Jan Krámek =

Czech politician (1945–2026)

Member of the Senate of the Czech Republic for Prague 12
- In office 23 November 1996 – 23 November 2000
- Preceded by: Constituency established
- Succeeded by: Edvard Outrata

Member of the Chamber of Deputies of the Czech Republic
- In office 1993–1996

Mayor of Prague-Zbraslav
- In office 1990–1994

Member of the Czech National Council
- In office 1990–1994

Personal details
- Born: 18 December 1945 Prague, Czechoslovakia
- Died: 17 April 2026 (aged 80)
- Party: Civic Democratic Party

Jan Krámek (18 December 1945 – 17 April 2026) was a Czech politician and founding member of the Civic Democratic Party (ODS).

== Biography ==
Krámek was born in Prague, Czechoslovakia, on 18 December 1945. He graduated from the Secondary School of Mechanical Engineering in Písek in 1964. He worked as a designer for ZVVU Milevsko, the Příbram District Construction Company, and Subterra Zbraslav.

Krámek served as a member of the Czech National Council from 1990 to 1994 and a deputy of the Chamber of Deputies of the Czech Republic from 1993 until 1996. He was then elected to the Senate of the Czech Republic, becoming the first senator to represent the newly created Senate district 17 – Prague 12 from 1996 until 2000. While in the Senate, Krámek became vice chairman of the Committee on Foreign Affairs, Defence and Security. He also served as Mayor of Prague-Zbraslav, a district of Prague, from 1990 until 1994.

Krámek died on 17 April 2026 at the age of 80.
