= Kateřina Valachová =

Czech politician and lawyer

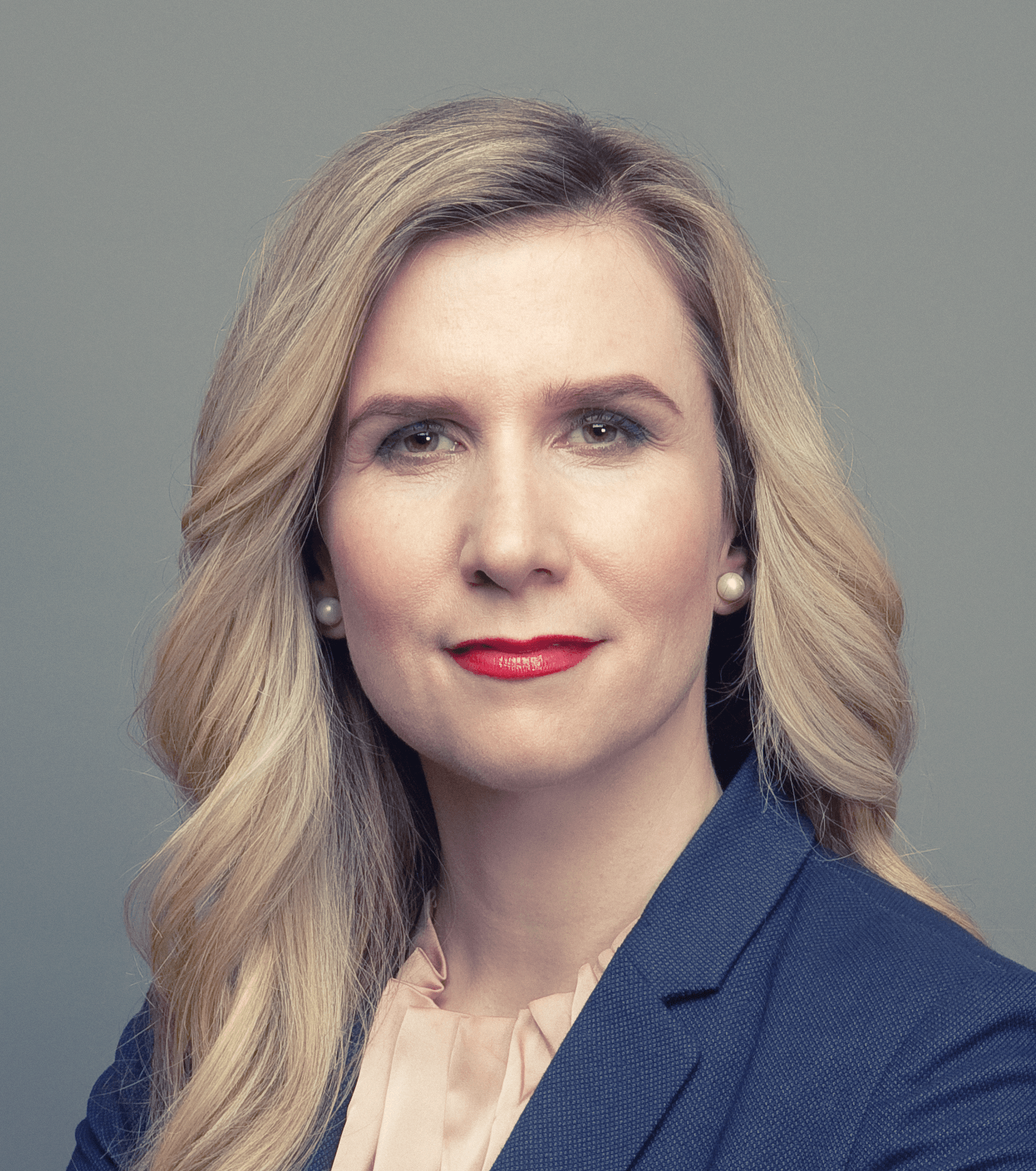

14th Minister of Education, Youth and Sports
- In office 17 June 2015 – 21 June 2017
- Prime Minister: Bohuslav Sobotka
- Preceded by: Marcel Chládek
- Succeeded by: Stanislav Štech

Member of the Chamber of Deputies
- In office 21 October 2017 – 21 October 2021

Personal details
- Born: 15 September 1976 (age 50) Brno, Czechoslovakia (now Czech Republic)
- Party: ČSSD (2015–2022)
- Children: 2
- Education: Masaryk University
- Profession: Lawyer
- Website: Official website

Kateřina Valachová (born 15 September 1976) is a Czech politician and lawyer who served as Minister of Education, Youth and Sports of the Czech Republic in the Cabinet of Bohuslav Sobotka from 2015 to 2017. Valachová was also a member of the Chamber of Deputies from October 2017 to October 2021.
