= Stanislav Štech =

Czech psychologist and politician

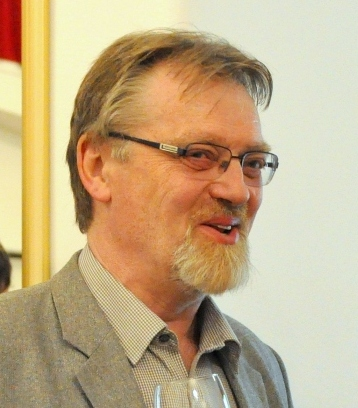

15th Minister of Education, Youth and Sports
- In office 21 June 2017 – 13 December 2017
- Prime Minister: Bohuslav Sobotka
- Preceded by: Kateřina Valachová
- Succeeded by: Robert Plaga

Personal details
- Born: 23 August 1954 (age 72) Podbořany, Czechoslovakia
- Children: 2
- Education: Charles University; Lycée Carnot in Dijon
- Profession: Psychologist
- Website: stanislavstech.cz

Stanislav Štech (born 23 August 1954) is a Czech politician and psychologist. From June to December 2017, he was the Minister of Education, Youth and Sports of the Czech Republic in the Cabinet of Bohuslav Sobotka.

On 23 June 2011, he was awarded the grade of Officer of the Order of Academic Palms for his contributions to education and training.

In 2012 he became the President of the International Congress of Psychology under the auspices of the International Union of Psychological Science - IUPsyS, to be held in Prague in 2020. Due to the COVID-19 pandemic, the congress was postponed until 2021, when it was held fully online. In the same year, the IUPsyS leadership decided to organize the 33rd International Congress of Psychology, held from 21–26 July 2024 in Prague, with Stanislav Štech still serving as the longest-serving President of the Congress of Psychology.
