= VR1 =

VR1 may refer to:

- Rishi Rich, British-Indian music producer
- TRPV1, a vanilloid receptor
- Training Reactor VR-1 pool-type nuclear reactor
- VR Class Vr1, a Finnish locomotive
- VR1, Madeira, the main freeway on the Portuguese island Madeira
- VR-1, a virtual reality system made by Sega.
