= Training Reactor VR-1 =

Light water reactor in Prague, Czech Republic

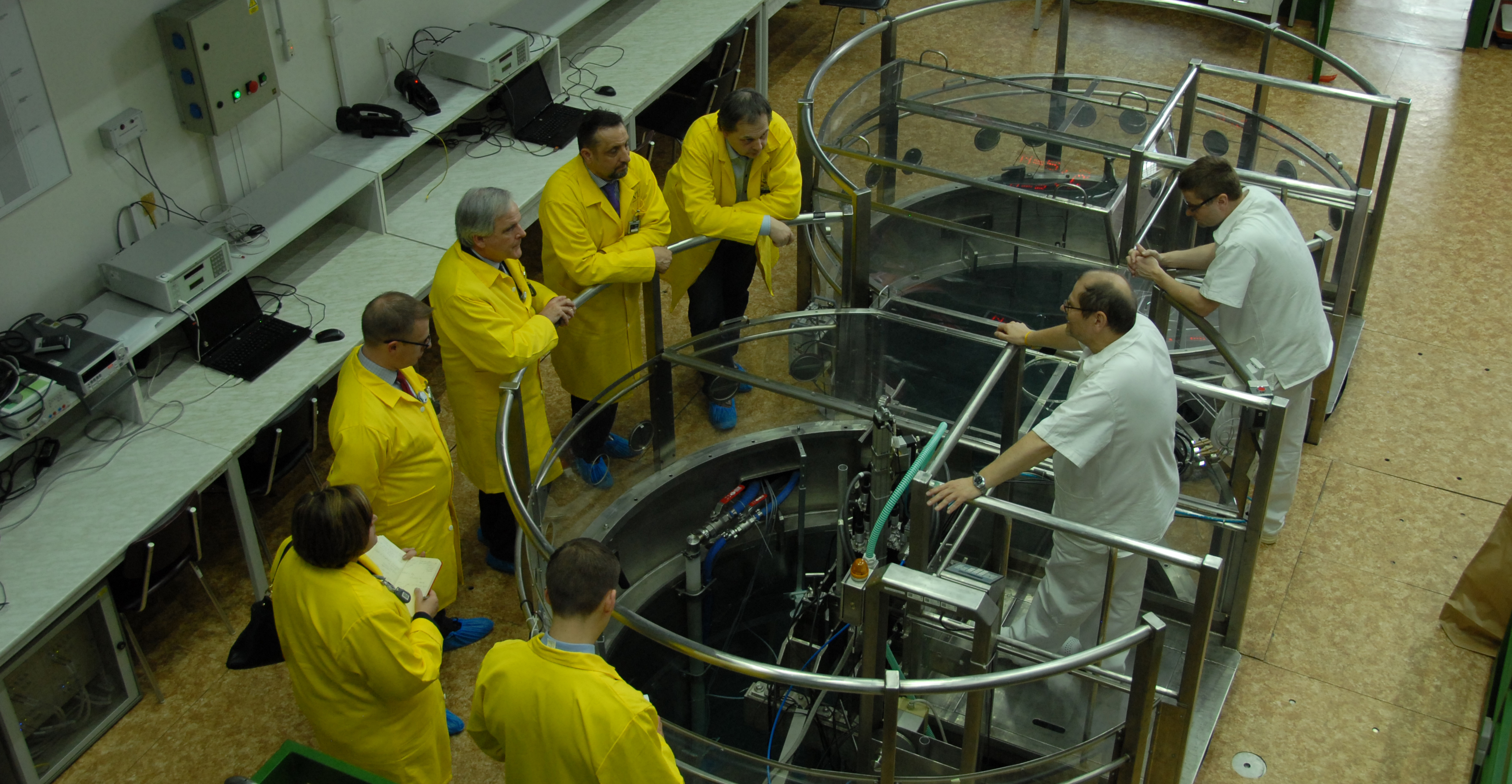
- NRC Chairman Stephen Burns visiting the VR-1 Sparrow research reactor
- Location: Czech Republic
- Coordinates: 50°6′55″N 14°27′1″E
- Type: pool type
- Power: 1000 W, 5000 W (max. 70 h/year) (thermal)

Construction and upkeep
- Construction began: 1982
- First criticality: December 3, 1990

Technical specifications
- Max thermal flux: 1-2×10^9 n/cm^2s
- Fuel type: IRT-4M
- Cooling: light-water
- Neutron moderator: light-water
- Neutron reflector: light-water
- Control rods: cadmium
- Cladding material: aluminium alloy

The VR-1 training reactor is a zero power pool-type light water reactor. It is located at the Czech Technical University in Prague. Its layout enables simple and comfortable access to the core, easy insertion and removal of experimental devices and samples, and simple and safe manipulation with fuel assemblies.

== Design ==
The reactor consists of two vessels placed in a shielding made of barytic concrete. The H01 vessel contains the reactor core; the H02 vessel serves for manipulations with fuel assemblies and for temporary storage of the fuel. The core is composed of IRT-4M tubular fuel assemblies with the enrichment in U-235 of almost 20 %. Four-, six-, and eight-tube modifications of the fuel assemblies are available.

For neutron moderation as well as for heat removal from the core the light demineralized water is used; it also acts as a neutron reflector and a biological shielding. Due to the low power of the reactor, natural convection is adequate for heat removal from the core. The reactor is operated under the atmospheric pressure and the temperature of ca. 20 °C (68 °F).

The reactor control is provided by 5-7 control rods of UR-70 type; their number depends on the particular core configuration. Detectors for power measurement, as well as experimental samples could be inserted in dry vertical channels. Moreover, radial and tangential channels are available.

== Education and training ==
The VR -1 reactor is basically used for education of students and training of experts in the field of nuclear energetics. Lectures and seminars at the reactor are organized for students from the Czech Technical University as well as from other universities. Intensive courses are held for training of nuclear power plants' staff. Training is focused on areas such as reactor physics, neutronics, dosimetry, nuclear safety and I&C systems.

Experimental exercises and the opportunity to practice the reactor control supplement the theoretical knowledge gained during the education process and help to train high-quality experts in the nuclear field. For example, students have the opportunity to design their core configuration for which they perform theoretical calculations and prepare data for obtaining authorization from the State Office for Nuclear Safety. Afterwards, they actively take part in assembling the designed core configuration.

The Reactor, as a specialized training facility of the Ministry of Education, Youth and Sports, is open not only to students of the Faculty of Nuclear Sciences and Physical Engineering, but also to students of other universities in the Czech Republic. Extensive international cooperation should be mentioned. It comprises organisations of courses for foreign universities (from Slovakia, United States, United Kingdom, Finland, etc.), as well as cooperation with international organisations (IAEA, ENEN) on realizations of workshops and seminars. In addition, VR-1 reactor hosts trainings for participants beyond standard nuclear engineering programs. E.g. trainings in non-proliferation for nuclear security experts, the hands on training in radiation for firefighter units. Integral part of reactor operation is improving the general public awareness of nuclear technology. Thus, technical visits are organized for students from secondary schools and universities.
