= Suchá Loz =

- Municipality
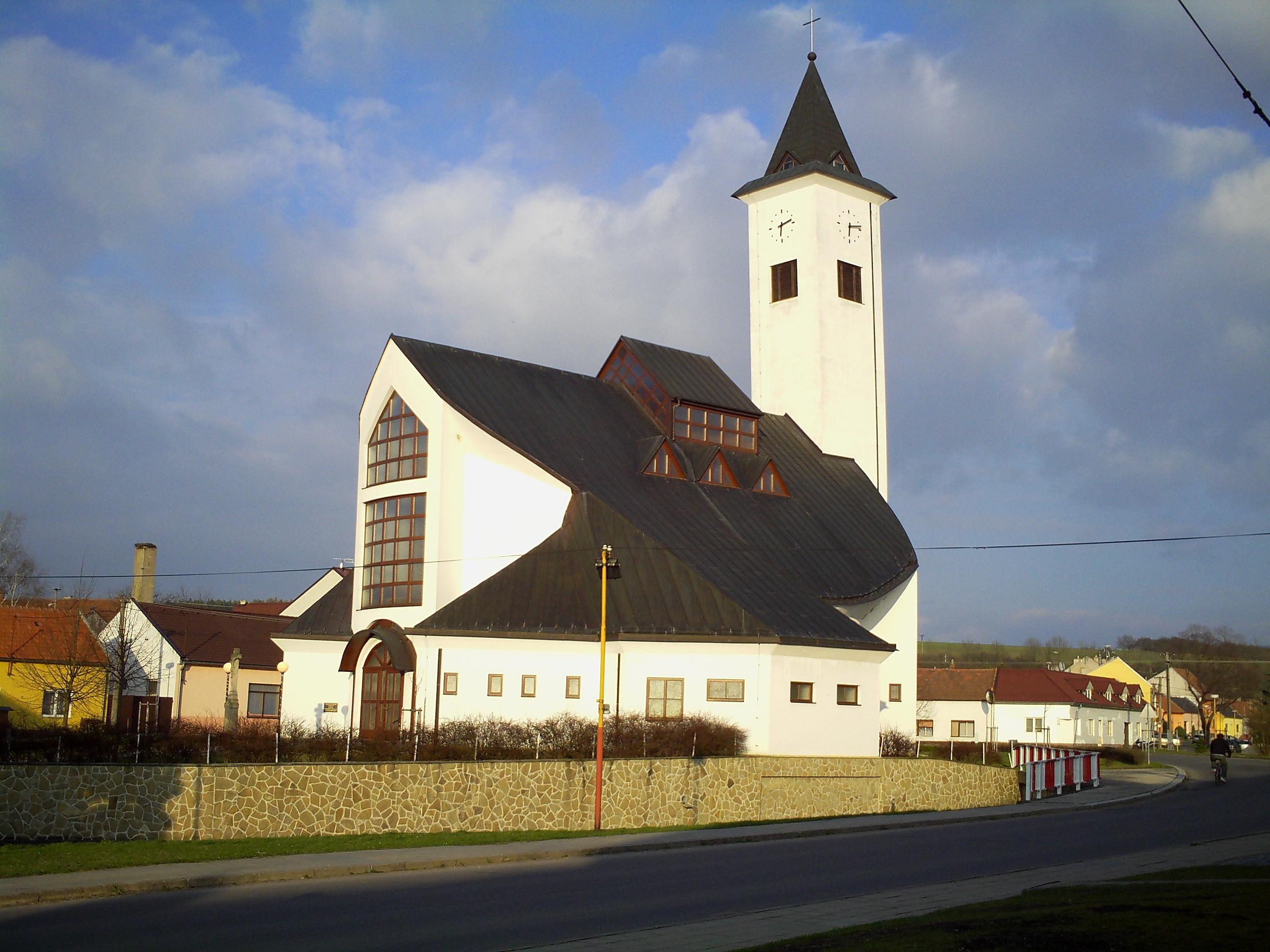
- Church of Saint Ludmila

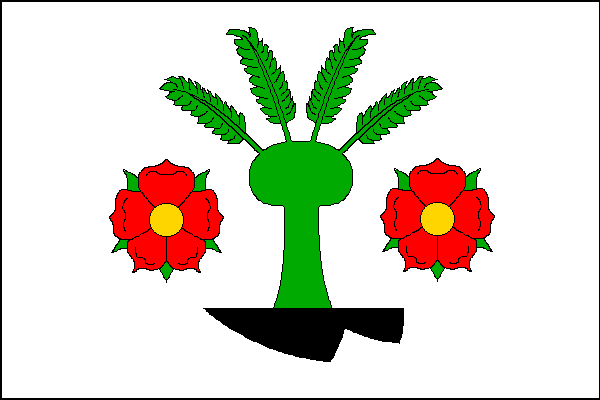
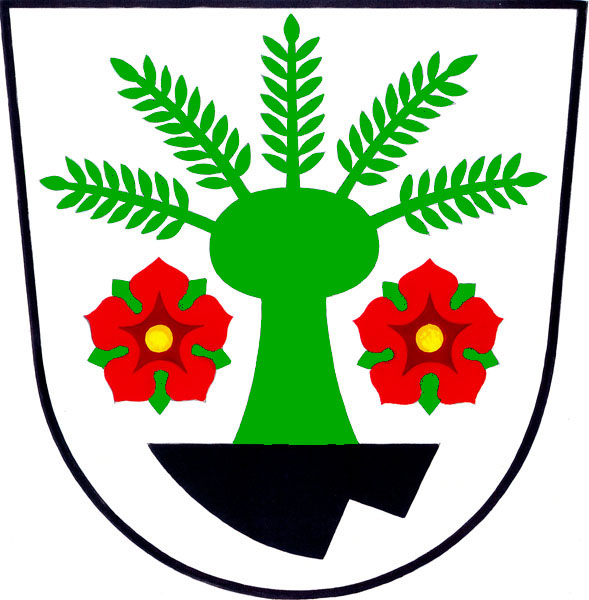
- Flag Coat of arms

- Location in the Czech Republic
- Coordinates: 48°58′12″N 17°42′50″E
- Country: Czech Republic
- Region: Zlín
- District: Uherské Hradiště
- First mentioned: 1261

Area
  - Total: 17.00 km^{2} (6.56 sq mi)
- Elevation: 304 m (997 ft)

Population (2026-01-01)
  - Total: 1,165
  - Density: 68.53/km^{2} (177.5/sq mi)
- Time zone: UTC+1 (CET)
  - Summer (DST): UTC+2 (CEST)
- Postal code: 687 53
- Website: www.suchaloz.cz

Suchá Loz is a municipality and village in Uherské Hradiště District in the Zlín Region of the Czech Republic. It has about 1,200 inhabitants.

== Geography ==
Suchá Loz is located about 20 kilometres (12 mi) southeast of Uherské Hradiště and 28 km (17 mi) south of Zlín. The northern part of the municipality with the built-up area lies in the Vizovice Highlands. The southern part lies in the White Carpathians mountain range. The highest point is the mountain Studený vrch at 646 m (2,119 ft) above sea level. The village is situated along the Nivnička Stream. Most of the municipality lies in the Bílé Karpaty Protected Landscape Area.

== History ==
The first written mention of Suchá Loz is from 1261.

== Demographics ==
Historical population

Year	Pop.	±%
1869	604	—
1880	664	+9.9%
1890	714	+7.5%
1900	823	+15.3%
1910	955	+16.0%

Year	Pop.	±%
1921	979	+2.5%
1930	909	−7.2%
1950	982	+8.0%
1961	1,213	+23.5%
1970	1,251	+3.1%

Year	Pop.	±%
1980	1,254	+0.2%
1991	1,158	−7.7%
2001	1,093	−5.6%
2011	1,084	−0.8%
2021	1,078	−0.6%

Source: Censuses

== Transport ==
There are no railways or major roads passing through the municipality.

== Sights ==
The main landmark of Suchá Loz is the Church of Saint Ludmila. It is a modern church, built in 1994–1999.

The only protected cultural monuments in the municipality so far is a rural house from the mid-19th century, but due to recent reconstruction it has lost its value.

The municipality is known for its mineral water spring, which are said to have restorative properties. The existence of the spring has been known since 1580.

== Notable people ==
- Petr Gazdík (born 1974), politician, mayor of Suchá Loz in 2002–2010
