= Robert Plaga =

Czech politician (born 1978)

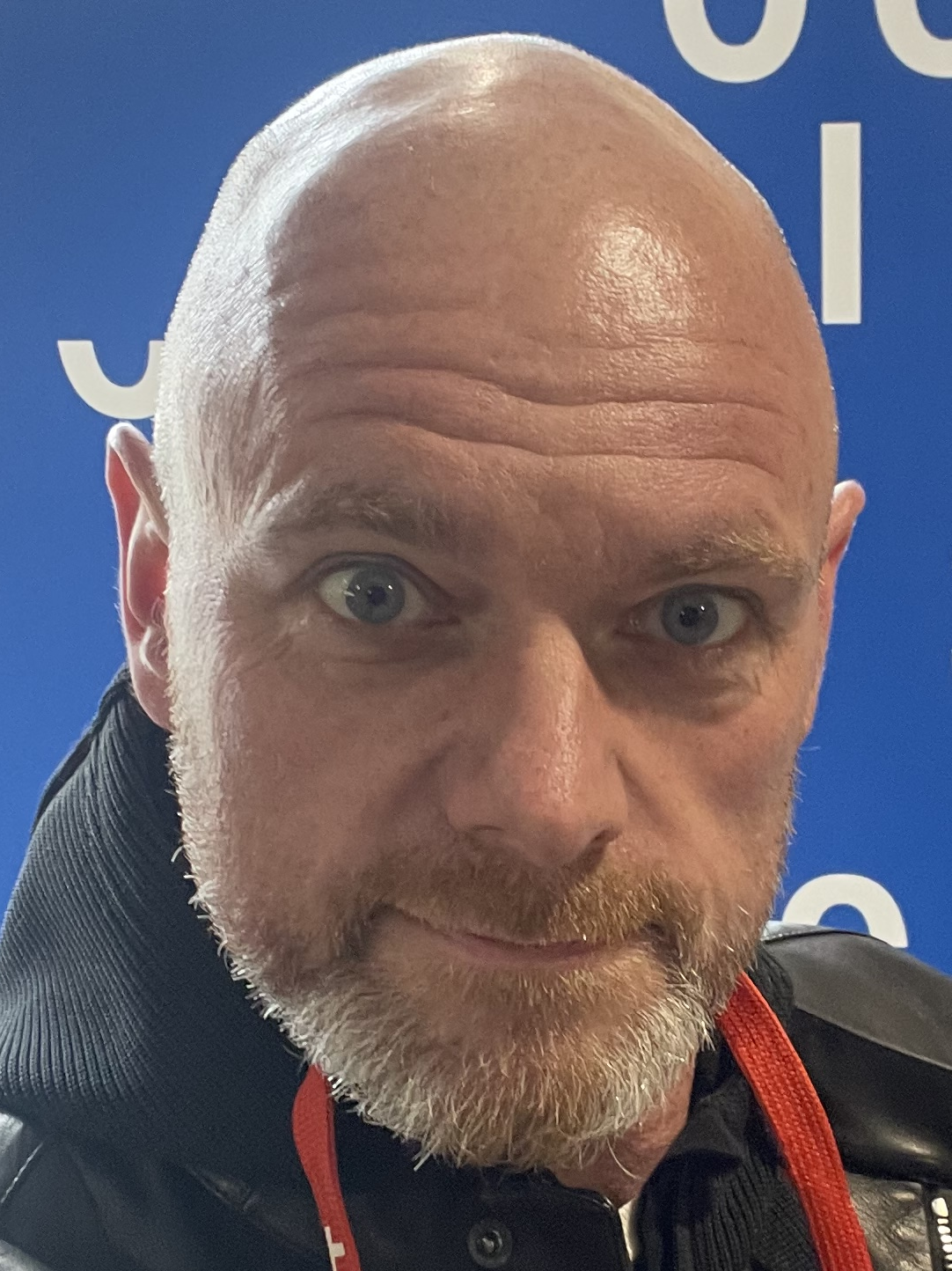
- Plaga in 2023

Minister of Education, Youth and Sports
- Incumbent
- Assumed office 15 December 2025
- Prime Minister: Andrej Babiš
- Preceded by: Mikuláš Bek
- In office 13 December 2017 – 17 December 2021
- Prime Minister: Andrej Babiš
- Preceded by: Stanislav Štech
- Succeeded by: Petr Gazdík

Deputy Minister of Education, Youth and Sports
- In office 18 December 2021 – 31 August 2022
- In office 1 February 2015 – 13 December 2017

Member of the Chamber of Deputies
- Incumbent
- Assumed office 4 October 2025

Personal details
- Born: 21 July 1978 (age 48) Ivančice, Czechoslovakia
- Party: ANO (2012–2020); Independent (nominated by ANO, 2020–present)
- Spouse: Jana Plagová
- Education: Mendel University Brno

Robert Plaga (born 21 July 1978) is a Czech politician and university teacher who has served as Minister of Education since December 2025 in the third cabinet of Andrej Babiš, and previously from 2017 to 2021 in the second cabinet of Andrej Babiš.

== Political career ==
In December 2011, Plaga joined the Ministry of Education, Youth and Sports, but later left his position, stating that his ideas about professional management of the agenda did not coincide with the ideas of the ministry.

Between 2012 and 2015, Plaga was the director of the Center for Technology Transfer of Mendel University in Brno.

After the resignation of rector Vojtěch Adam, Plaga was entrusted with the management of Mendel University in the beginning of February 2022 as Deputy Minister of Education. He held the position for two months, before Jan Mareš took over at the end of March 2022.

After leaving ANO, Plaga became Deputy Minister of Education, Youth and Sports in the cabinet of Petr Fiala.

== Personal life ==
Plaga is married to Jana Plagová.
