= Petr Gazdík =

Czech politician

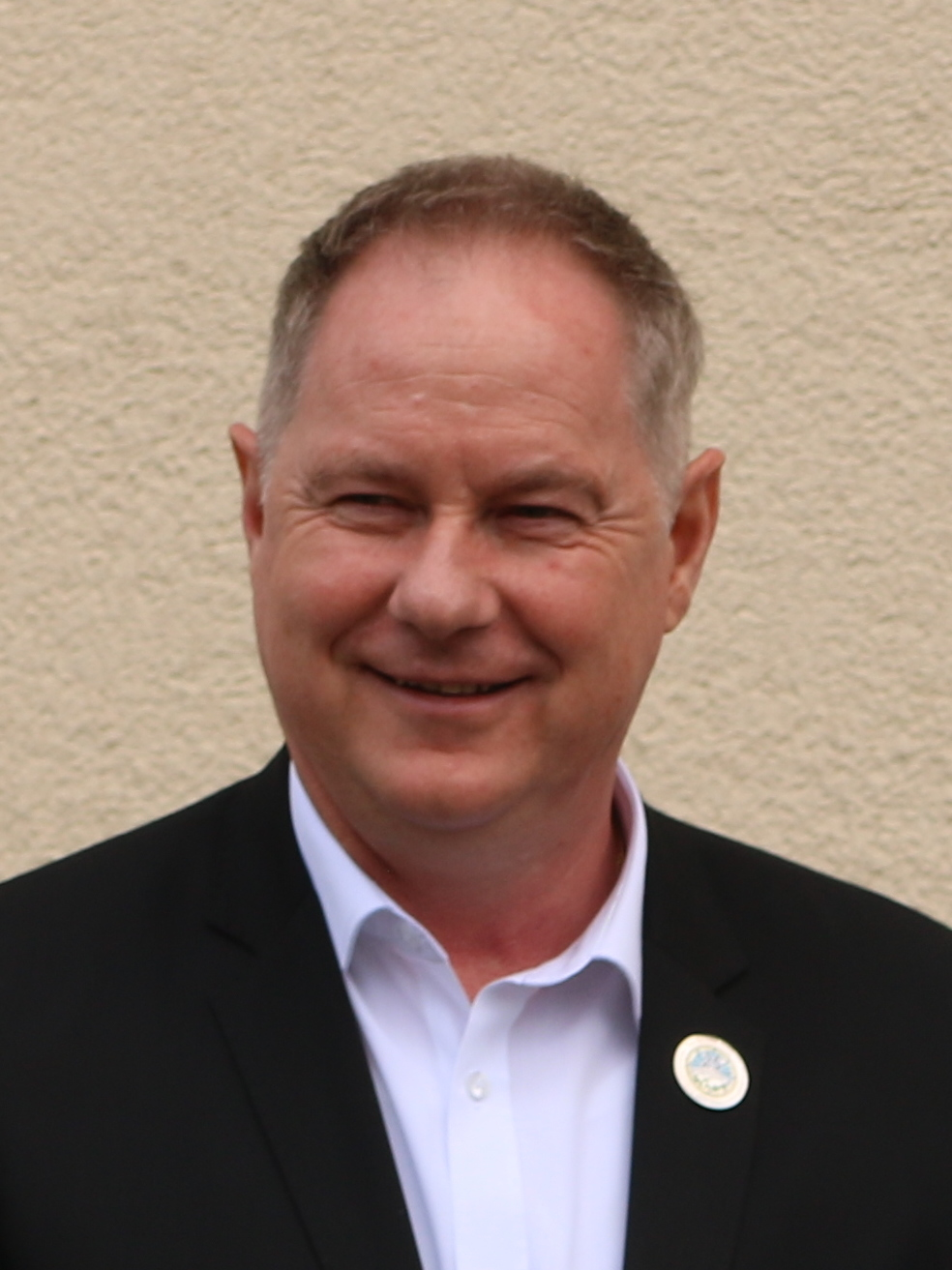
- Gazdik in 2022

Minister of Education, Youth and Sports
- In office 17 December 2021 – 29 June 2022
- Prime Minister: Petr Fiala
- Preceded by: Robert Plaga
- Succeeded by: Vladimír Balaš

Deputy Speaker of the Chamber of Deputies
- In office 12 December 2013 – 24 November 2017

Leader of STAN
- In office 16 April 2016 – 13 April 2019
- Preceded by: Martin Půta
- Succeeded by: Vít Rakušan
- In office 19 February 2009 – 28 March 2014
- Preceded by: Josef Zicha
- Succeeded by: Martin Půta

Member of the Chamber of Deputies
- In office 29 May 2010 – 8 October 2025

1st Vice-Chair of STAN
- In office 28 March 2014 – 16 April 2016
- Preceded by: Stanislav Polčák
- Succeeded by: Vít Rakušan

Mayor of Suchá Loz
- In office 2002–2010
- Succeeded by: Václav Bujáček

Personal details
- Born: 26 June 1974 (age 52) Uherské Hradiště, Czechoslovakia (now Czech Republic)
- Party: Mayors and Independents (2004-present)
- Spouse: Eva Gazdíková
- Children: 4
- Education: Masaryk University
- Occupation: politician, teacher
- Website: www.gazdik.cz

Petr Gazdík (born 26 June 1974) is a Czech politician who served as Minister of Education, Youth and Sports of the Czech Republic in the Cabinet of Petr Fiala from December 2021 to June 2022 and was a leader of Mayors and Independents party from 2009 to 2014 and 2016 to 2019. Previously he was a mayor of Suchá Loz. He is married and he has four children.

On 19 June 2022 Gazdík announced his resignation as Minister of Education, Youth and Sports in connection with his ties with businessman and lobbyist Michal Redl, he also resigned as vice-president of STAN.
