= Faculty of Nuclear Sciences and Physical Engineering CTU in Prague =

Faculty of Czech Technical University

Faculty of Nuclear Sciences and Physical Engineering
- Fakulta jaderná a fyzikálně inženýrská ČVUT v Praze (FJFI ČVUT)
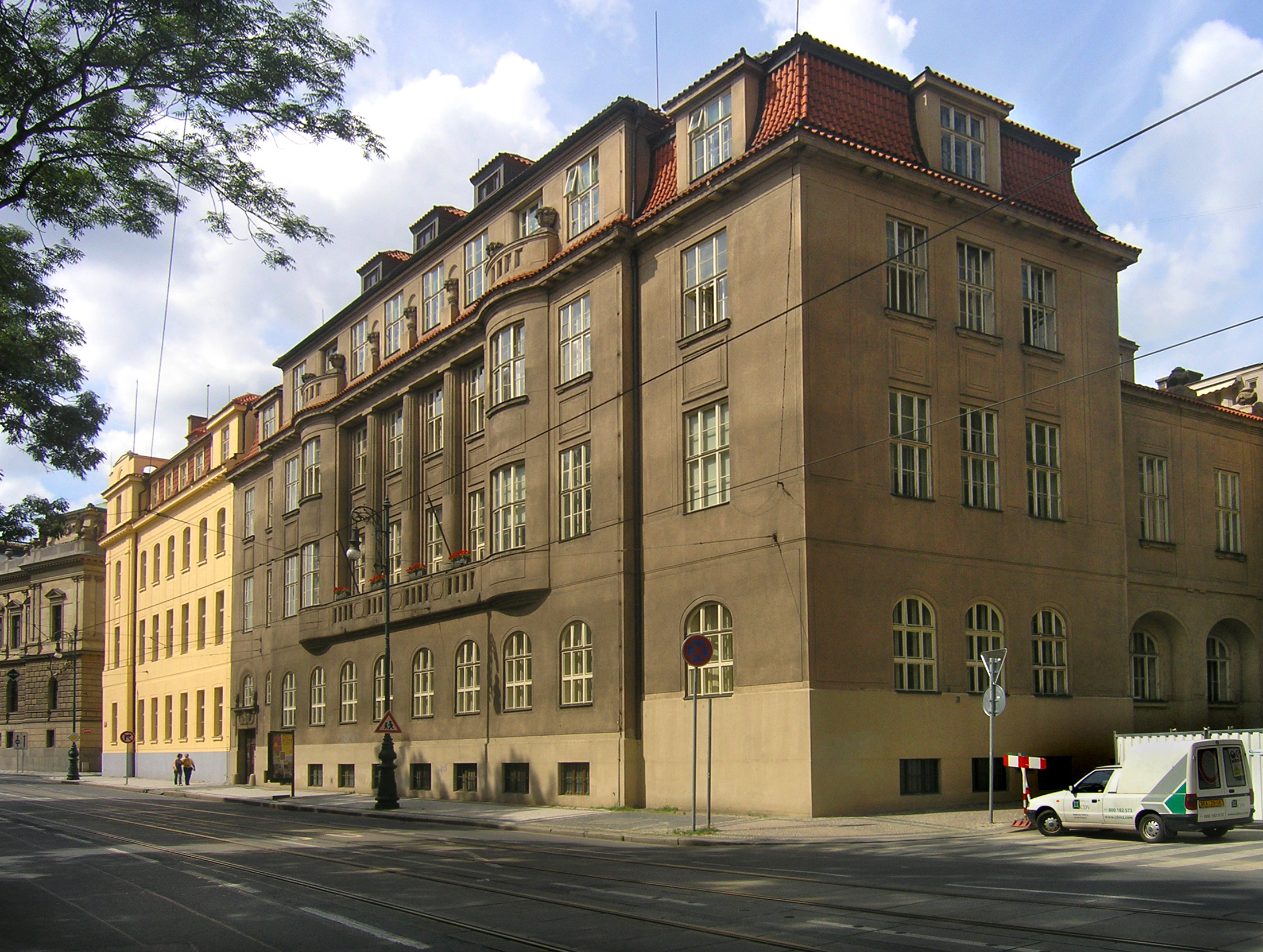
- The main building of FNSPE in the Old Town
- Former names: Faculty of technical and nuclear physics (1955 – 1959)
- Type: Public
- Established: 1955
- Dean: doc. Ing. Václav Čuba, Ph.D.
- Location: Prague, Děčín
- Campus: Urban
- Website: fjfi.cvut.cz/en

Faculty of Nuclear Sciences and Physical Engineering (abbreviated FNSPE CTU) is one of the 8 faculties of the CTU in Prague. It specializes in nuclear physics and chemistry, mathematical engineering and related fields.

== History ==
The faculty was established in 1955 as part of Charles University as the Faculty of Technical and Nuclear Physics. In 1959 the faculty became part of Czech Technical University (CTU) and renamed to its current name. The first dean of the faculty was doc. Václav Petržílka.

In its beginnings, the faculty had three departments (Department of Nuclear Physics, Nuclear Chemistry and Nuclear Engineering) and most of the equipment and academic staff were lent from the MFF UK. Its first students graduated in 1960.

In the following decades, the faculty expanded its study programmes and departments to include additional fields such as: plasma physics, detection systems, laser physics, artificial intelligence or radiotherapy.

Since 1990, the faculty has operated the training nuclear fission reactor VR-1 and since 2023, its second version VR-2. In cooperation with the International Atomic Energy Agency the reactors were equipped with the Internet Reactor Laboratory system, so that it is possible to conduct the teaching and training online.

Since 2007 the faculty also operates a tokamak-type nuclear fusion reactor called GOLEM.

== Departments ==
The faculty consists of 10 departments:

- Department of Dosimetry and Application of Ionizing Radiation
- Department of Humanities and Languages
- Department of Laser Physics and Photonics
- Department of Materials
- Department of Mathematics
- Department of Nuclear Chemistry
- Department of Nuclear Reactors
- Department of Physics
- Department of Software Engineering
- Department of Solid State Engineering

== Notable alumni ==
- Dana Drábová – Czech physicist, local politician and chair of the State Office for Nuclear Safety
- Jessica Fridrich – professor at the Binghamton University
- Karel Janák – Czech film director
- Eva Tylová – Czech environmentalist and politician
- Václav Žák – Czech politician and publicist, signatory of Charter 77

== Resources ==
=== Literature ===
- Lomič, Václav (1982), Vznik, vývoj a současnost Českého vysokého učení technického v Praze [Origin, development and present time of the Czech Technical University in Prague] (in Czech), Prague: SNTL, p. 99
