= Adéla Kochanovská =

Czech physicist and pioneer of X-ray crystallography

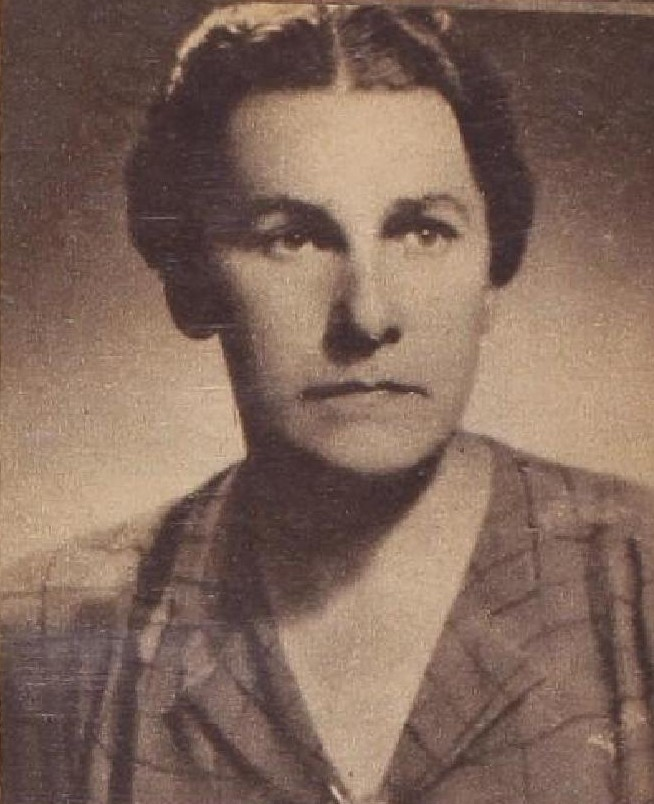
- Born: 8 March 1907; Slezská Ostrava, Austria-Hungary
- Died: 5 July 1985; Prague, Czechoslovakia
- Education: Charles University in Prague
- Known for: Pioneering work in X-ray structural analysis and radiocrystallography
- Awards: State Prize of Klement Gottwald (1953)
- Scientific career
- Fields: X-ray crystallography, radiography, solid-state physics
- Workplaces: Czech Technical University in Prague (ČVUT), Škoda Works, Spectroscopic Institute

Adéla Kochanovská (née Němejcová; 8 March 1907 – 5 July 1985) was a Czech physicist and crystallographer. She was the first woman to become a full professor of engineering in Czechoslovakia and one of the country's leading researchers in X-ray diffraction and crystallography.

== Early life and education ==
Kochanovská was born on 8 March 1907 in Slezská Ostrava, then part of Austria-Hungary. She completed her secondary education in Plzeň in 1926 and subsequently enrolled at the Faculty of Science, Charles University in Prague, where she studied mathematics and physics. During her studies, she attended lectures by physicist Václav Dolejšek, whose work on X-ray spectroscopy strongly influenced her scientific direction. She received her doctoral degree (RNDr.) under Dolejšek's supervision, focusing on X-ray and radiographic analysis.

== Career ==
After completing her studies, Kochanovská initially worked in a patent office before joining the Spectroscopic Institute and later the Physical Research Institute of the Škoda Works. During the German occupation, when Dolejšek was arrested by the Gestapo, she took temporary leadership of the institute's X-ray department.

Her research concentrated on:

- Structural analysis of materials using X-ray diffraction.
- Detection of crystal lattice defects using variable-wavelength X-rays.
- Investigation of rhombohedral and graphite modifications in solids.

She published around 70 scientific papers over her career and was considered a key figure in the development of X-ray crystallography in Czechoslovakia.

== Academic leadership ==
In 1968, Kochanovská became a full professor of physics at the Czech Technical University in Prague, making her the first woman professor in Czech engineering education. She also served as head of the Department of Solid State Engineering between 1968 and 1973.

Kochanovská founded the seminar series Rozhovory o aktuálních otázkách ve strukturní rentgenografii ("Conversations on Current Issues in Structural X-ray Crystallography"), which became an important platform for collaboration among physicists and material scientists.

== Awards and recognition ==
In 1953, she received the State Prize of Klement Gottwald for her studies on the rhombohedral modification of graphite and for developing new X-ray methods for determining fine structural properties of materials. In recognition of her pioneering contributions, a large lecture hall at the Czech Academy of Sciences' Institute of Physics was named in her honor.

== Personal life ==
Kochanovská married and adopted the surname Kochanovská-Němejcová. She faced personal challenges, including miscarriages attributed to early radiation exposure, and the loss of her only son. She died in Prague on 5 July 1985.

== Selected works ==
- Zkoušení jemné struktury materiálu röntgenovými paprsky (Testing the Fine Structure of Materials by X-rays) (1943)
- Strukturní rentgenografie (Structural X-ray Crystallography) (1964)
- "A contribution to the investigation of the rhombohedral modification of graphite" (1953)
- "The possibility of studying the distribution of lattice defects in crystallites by X-rays of various wavelengths" (1957)

== Legacy ==
Kochanovská is regarded as one of the founders of Czech radiocrystallography and a pioneer for women in engineering and physics in Czechoslovakia. Her career bridged academic and industrial research, and her teaching inspired a generation of Czech physicists.
