= Prague-Zbraslav =

- Municipal District of Prague
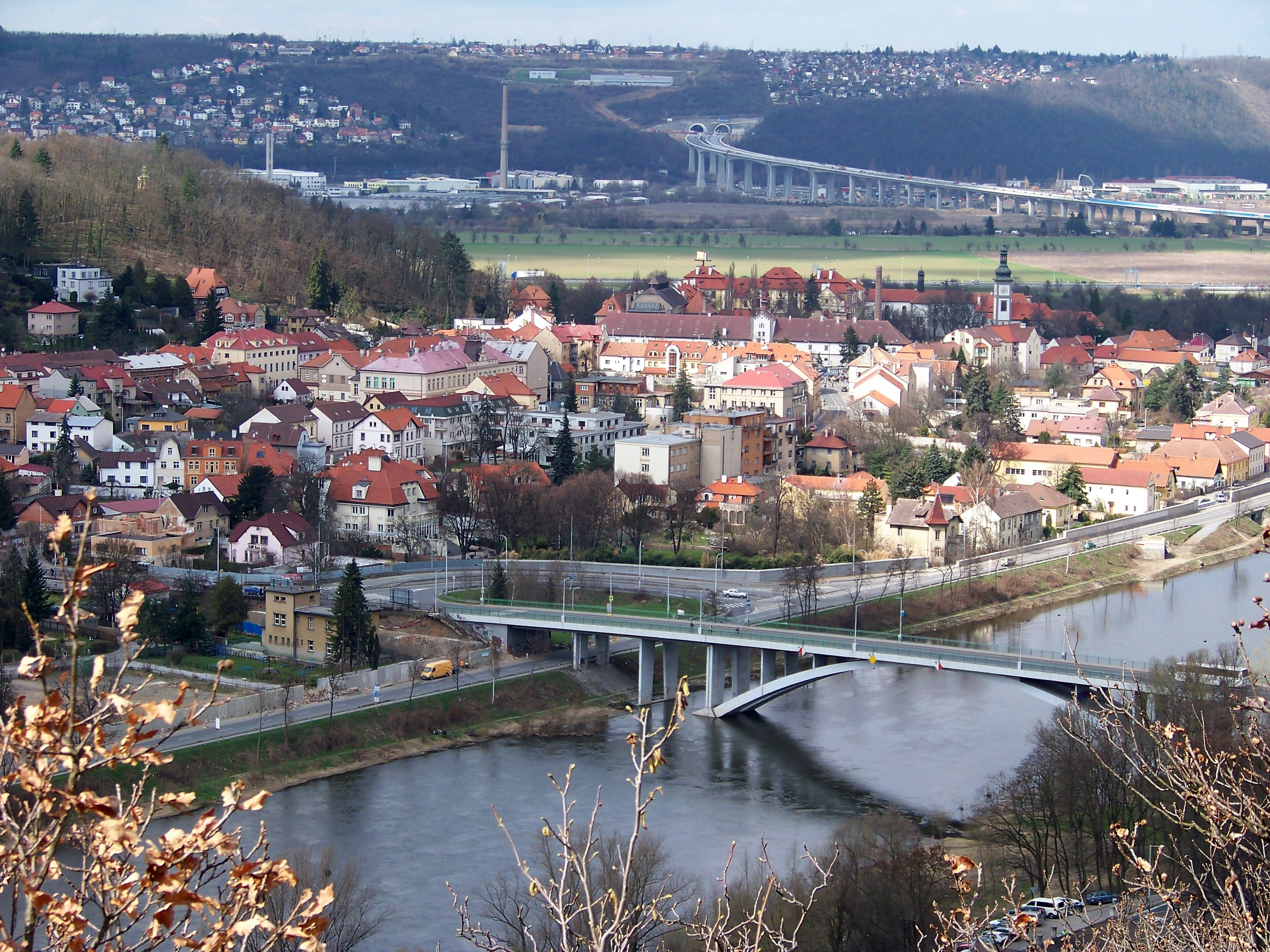
- Prague-Zbraslav from the right bank of the Vltava River

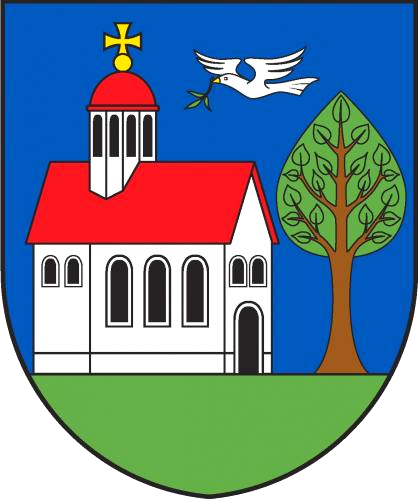
- Flag Coat of arms

- Location of Prague-Zbraslav in Prague
- Coordinates: 49.9675°N 14.386667°E
- Country: Czech Republic
- Region: Prague
- Administrative district: Prague 16
- Municipal district: Prague 5

Area
  - Total: 9.85 km^{2} (3.80 sq mi)

Population (2021)
  - Total: 10,140
  - Density: 1,030/km^{2} (2,670/sq mi)
- Time zone: UTC+1 (CET)
  - Summer (DST): UTC+2 (CEST)
- Postal code: 156 00

Prague-Zbraslav is a district in Prague, Czech Republic. It is situated in the southern part of the city, in the administrative district Prague 16. The cadastral area Zbraslav is part of this district.
