= Tomáš Grulich =

Czech politician (1951–2020)

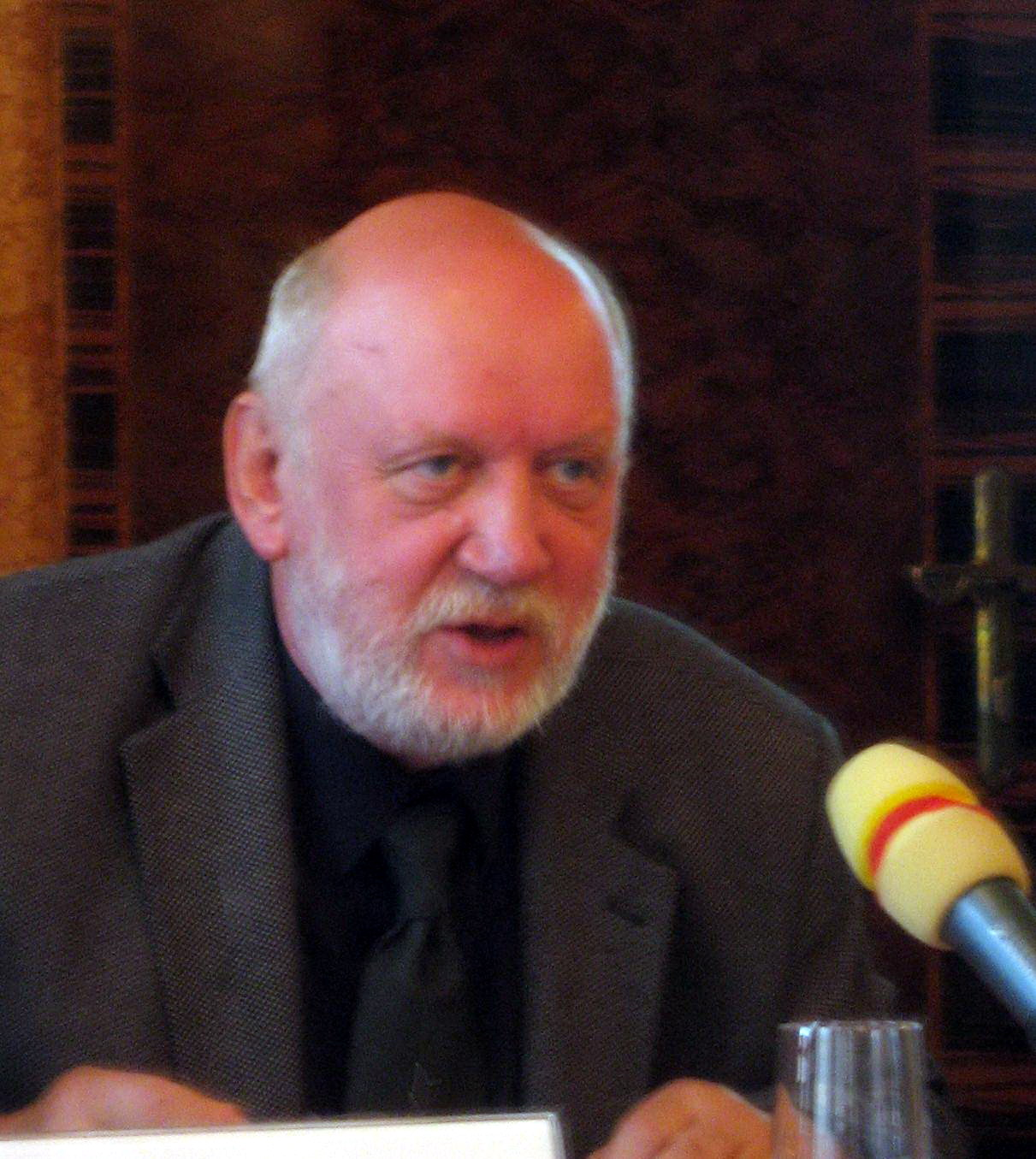

Senator from Prague 12
- In office 28 October 2006 – 20 October 2018
- Preceded by: Edvard Outrata
- Succeeded by: Pavel Fischer

Personal details
- Born: 14 January 1951 Prague, Czechoslovakia
- Died: 7 August 2020 (aged 69) Prague, Czech Republic
- Party: Civic Democratic Party (1992–2020)
- Education: Charles University
- Occupation: politician

Tomáš Grulich (14 January 1951 – 7 August 2020) was a Czech politician who served as a Senator from 2002 to 2018.
