= Eva Tylová =

Czech environmentalist and politician

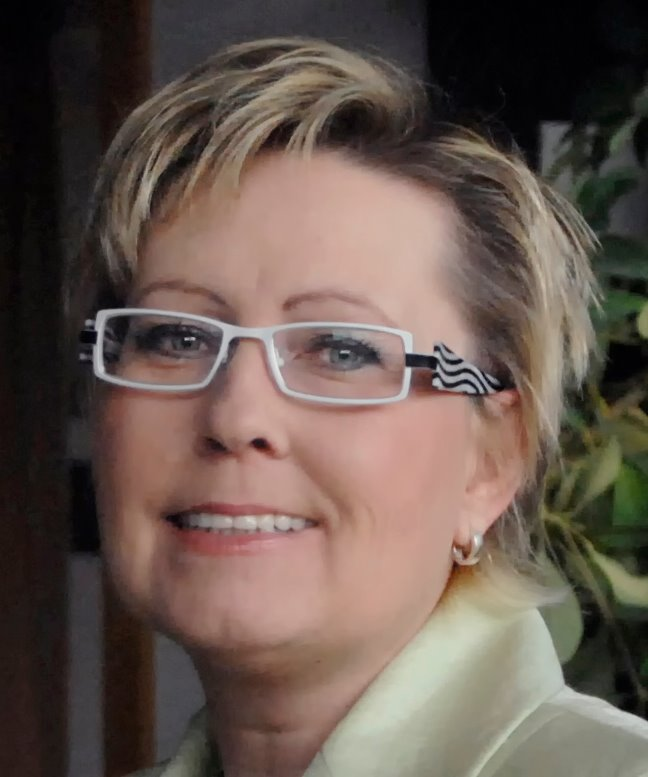
Eva Tylová

Eva Tylová (born 1959, Prague, Czechoslovakia) is a Czech environmentalist and politician.

She was Czech deputy minister of environment (1998-2002) a director of Czech environmental inspection (ČIZP) in 2002-3 and from 2007. Tylová is member of the Czech Green Party since 2005 a vicechairman of the Společnost pro trvale udržitelný život (Society for Sustainable Living).

In 2022, she was again elected as a Representative of the capital city of Prague, as a non-partisan for the Czech Pirate Party.
