= Ministry of Education, Youth and Sports (Czech Republic) =

Government ministry

Ministry of Education, Youth and Sports of the Czech Republic
- Ministerstvo školství, mládeže a tělovýchovy České republiky

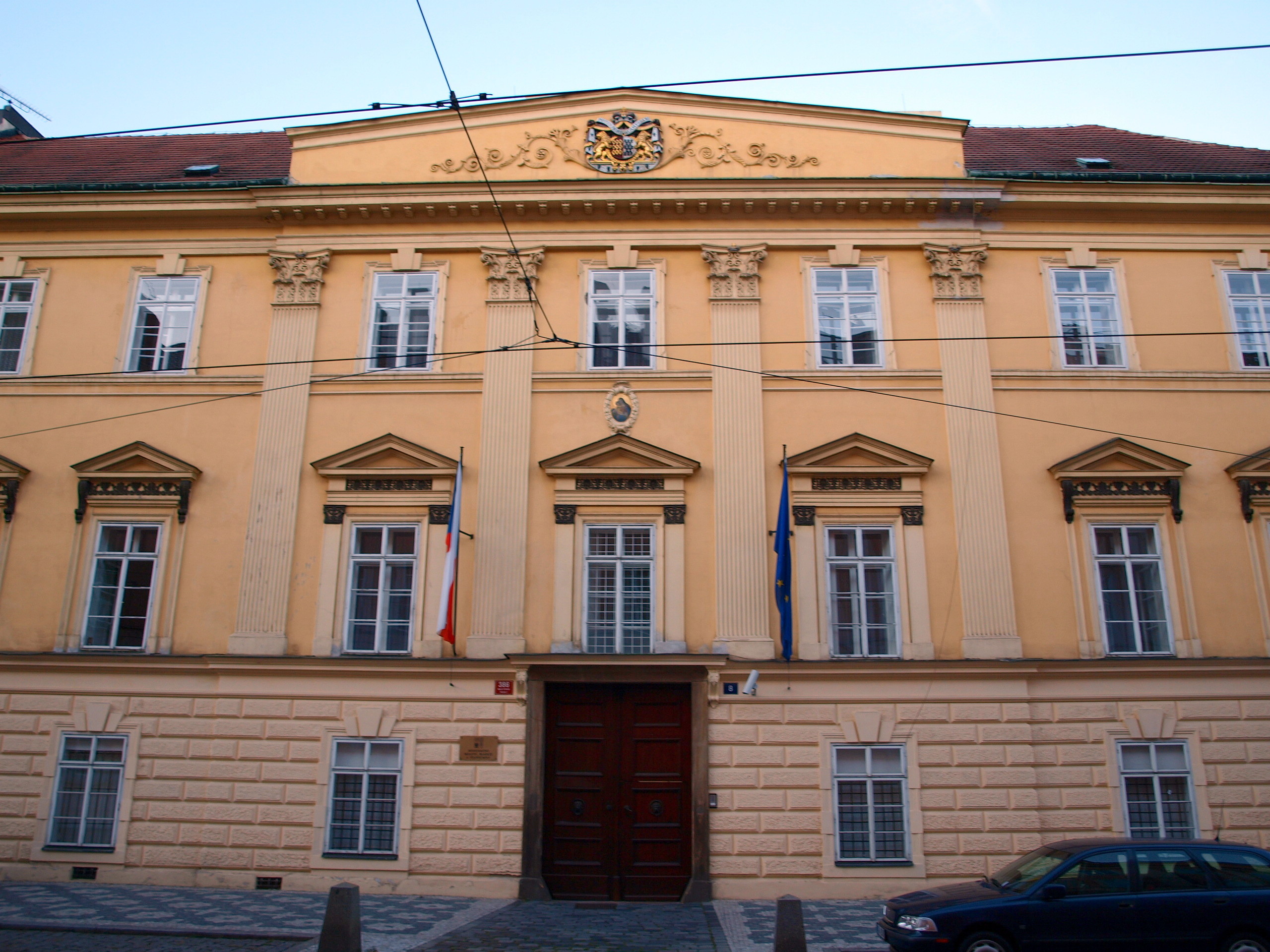

Agency overview
- Formed: 1969
- Headquarters: Karmelitská 7, 118 12 Prague 1 (Malá Strana); 50°5′7.38″N 14°24′13″E
- Agency executive: Robert Plaga, Minister of Education, Youth and Sports
- Website: msmt.gov.cz

The Ministry of Education, Youth and Sports of the Czech Republic (MEYS, Czech: Ministerstvo školství, mládeže a tělovýchovy České republiky; MŠMT ČR) is a government ministry that was established in 1969. Before the federalization of the Czechoslovak Socialist Republic, it was the Ministry of Education of Czechoslovakia.

Its head office is in Prague 1.
