= Chief of the General Staff (Czech Republic) =

Chief of the Czech military

- Náčelník generálního štábu
- Insignia of the general staff

- Flag of the General Staff

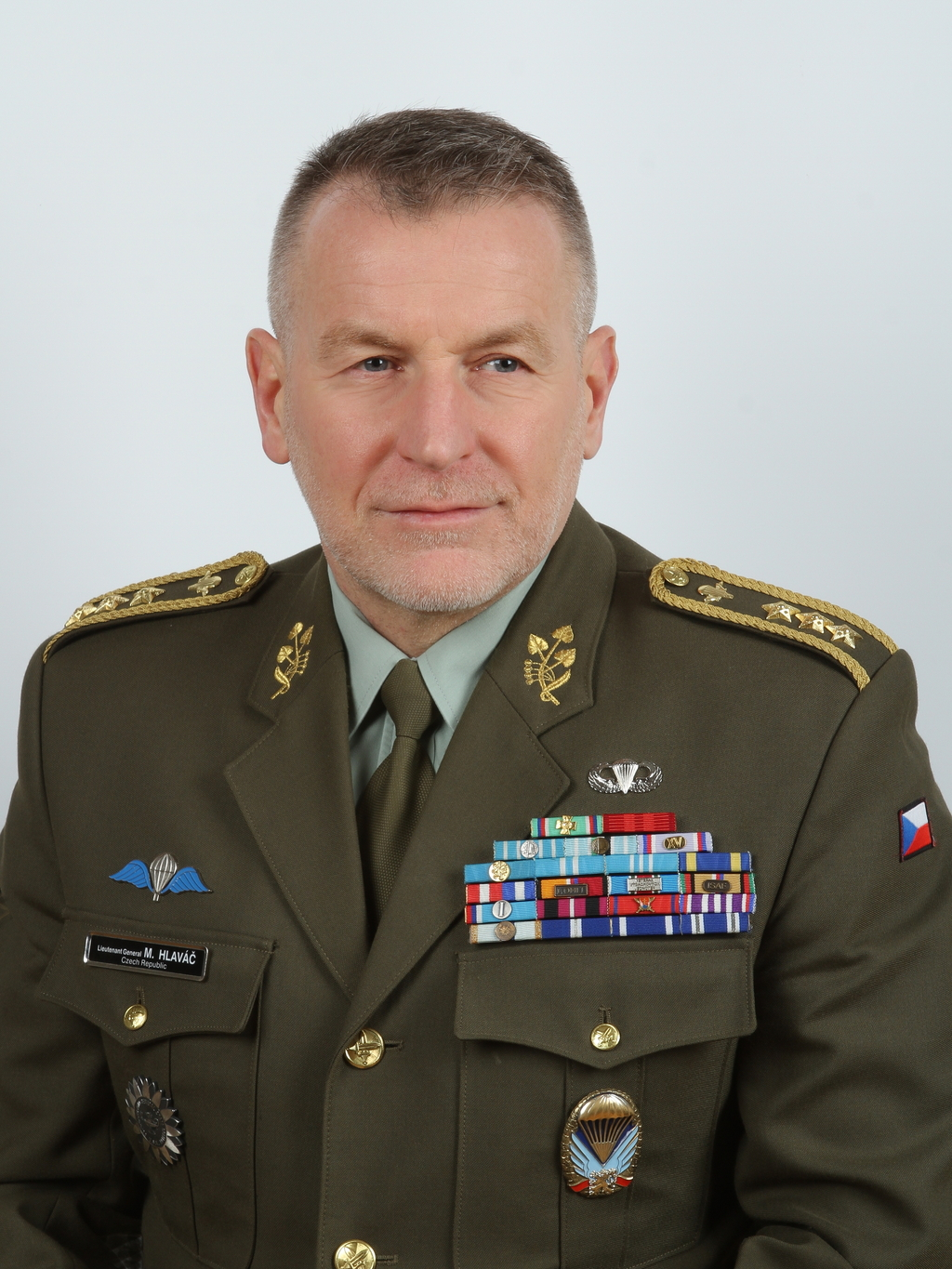
- Incumbent; Lieutenant general Miroslav Hlaváč since 1 July 2026
- Ministry of Defence
- Reports to: Minister of Defence
- Seat: Prague, Czech Republic
- Nominator: Government
- Appointer: President
- Term length: 3 years Renewable
- Precursor: Chief of the Czechoslovak General Staff
- Formation: 1 January 1993
- First holder: General of the Army Karel Pezl
- Website: www.mo.gov.cz

The Chief of the General Staff (Czech: Náčelník Generálního štábu) is the highest-ranking and most senior military officer of the Czech Armed Forces, the military of the Czech Republic. Candidate nominated to the position by the government is formally appointed by the president of the Czech Republic, who is the formal commander-in-chief, after being approved by defense committee of the Chamber of Deputies. Chief of the General Staff reports to the Minister of Defence and President of the republic removes him if government proposes his removal.

The current Chief of the general staff since July 2026 is Lieutenant general Miroslav Hlaváč.

== List of officeholders ==
For period from 1919 to 1992, see Chief of the General Staff of Czechoslovakia.

No.	Portrait	Chief of the General Staff	Took office	Left office	Time in office	Defence branch	Ref.
1	Karel Pezl [cs]	General of the Army; Karel Pezl (1927–2022)	1 January 1993	30 June 1993	180 days	Army	–
2	Jiří Nekvasil [cs]	General of the Army; Jiří Nekvasil (born 1948)	1 July 1993	30 April 1998	4 years, 303 days	Army	–
3	Jiří Šedivý	General of the Army; Jiří Šedivý (born 1953)	1 May 1998	30 November 2002	4 years, 213 days	Army	–
4	Pavel Štefka [cs]	General of the Army; Pavel Štefka (born 1954)	1 December 2002	28 February 2007	4 years, 89 days	Army	–
5	Vlastimil Picek	General of the Army; Vlastimil Picek (born 1956) (Note: Afterwards served as the Minister of Defence from 2013 to 2014.)	1 March 2007	30 June 2012	5 years, 121 days	Air Force	–
6	Petr Pavel	General of the Army; Petr Pavel (born 1961) (Note: Left the office due to appointment as Chairman of the NATO Military Committee.)	1 July 2012	1 May 2015	2 years, 304 days	Army	–
7	Josef Bečvář	General of the Army; Josef Bečvář (born 1958)	1 May 2015	1 May 2018	3 years, 0 days	Army	–
8	Aleš Opata	General of the Army; Aleš Opata (born 1964)	1 May 2018	1 July 2022	4 years, 61 days	Army	–
9	Karel Řehka	General of the Army; Karel Řehka (born 1975)	1 July 2022	30 June 2026	3 years, 364 days	Special Forces	–
10	Miroslav Hlaváč	Lieutenant general Miroslav Hlaváč (born 1965)	1 July 2026	Incumbent	68 days	Army	–

== See also ==
- Czech Armed Forces
