= Petr Pavel =

President of the Czech Republic since 2023

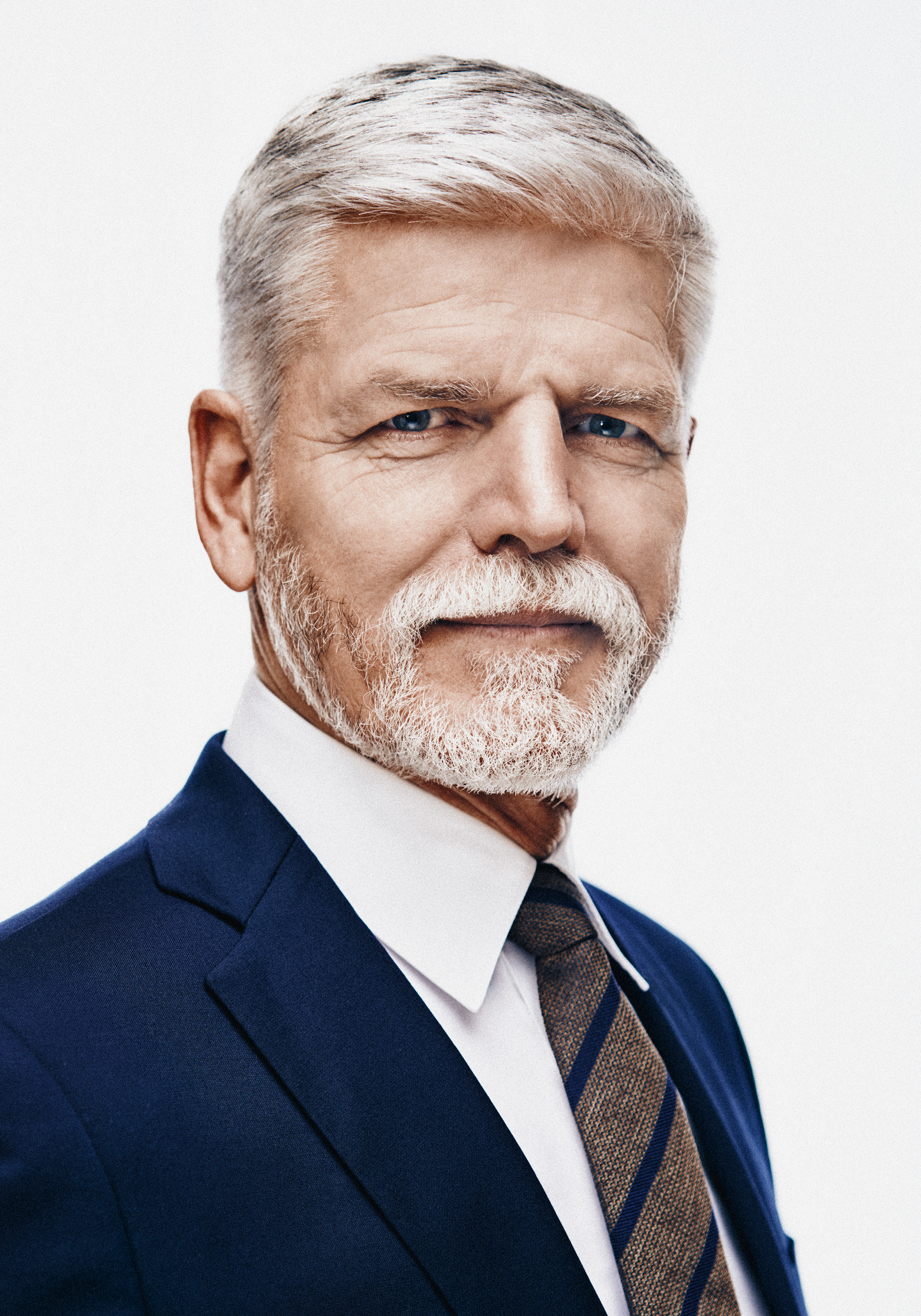
- Official portrait, 2023

4th President of the Czech Republic
- Incumbent
- Assumed office 9 March 2023
- Prime Minister: Petr Fiala; Andrej Babiš
- Preceded by: Miloš Zeman

Chair of the NATO Military Committee
- In office 26 June 2015 – 29 June 2018
- Preceded by: Knud Bartels
- Succeeded by: Stuart Peach

Chief of the General Staff
- In office 1 July 2012 – 1 May 2015
- President: Václav Klaus; Miloš Zeman
- Preceded by: Vlastimil Picek
- Succeeded by: Josef Bečvář

Personal details
- Born: 1 November 1961 (age 64) Planá, Czechoslovakia
- Party: Independent (since 1989)
- Other political affiliations: Communist (1985–1989)
- Spouse(s): Hana Pavlová (m. 1986; div. 2001) Eva Pavlová (m. 2004)
- Children: 3
- Education: Military University of the Ground Forces Vyškov (1979–1983, Ing.); Military Academy Brno (1988–1991); King's College London (2005–2006, MA)
- Awards: Cross of Merit of the Minister of Defence of the Czech Republic; Medal of Heroism; Commander of the Legion of Merit (United States); Officer of the Legion of Honour (France); Cross for Military Valour (France)

Military service
- Allegiance: Czechoslovakia (1979–1992); Czech Republic (1993–2018)
- Branch/service: Czechoslovak People's Army (1979–1990); Czechoslovak Army (1990–1992); Czech Army (1993–2018)
- Years of service: 1979–2018
- Rank: Army general
- Battles/wars: Yugoslav Wars; UNPROFOR missions; Afghanistan War; Operation Enduring Freedom; Iraq War; 2003 invasion of Iraq

Petr Pavel (Note: Czech pronunciation: [ˈpɛtr̩ ˈpavɛl]) (born 1 November 1961) is a Czech politician and retired army general, currently serving as the fourth president of the Czech Republic, in office since March 2023. Prior to this, he served as Chair of the NATO Military Committee from 2015 to 2018, and served as the Chief of the General Staff of the Czech Armed Forces between 2012 and 2015.

Born in Planá to a military family, Pavel enlisted right after graduating from military academy in 1983. He served in the Czechoslovak People's Army, joined the Communist Party of Czechoslovakia in 1985, and then joined the Communist military intelligence in 1988. Following the Velvet Revolution in 1989, and the subsequent dissolution of Czechoslovakia, Pavel served in the newly established Czech Army and participated in the 1993 evacuation of Karin Base during the Croatian War of Independence, which earned him praise and international recognition. Pavel rose through the ranks of the military to become the Chief of the General Staff of the Czech Armed Forces from 2012 to 2015. He was subsequently selected as Chairman of the NATO Military Committee between 2015 and 2018, becoming the first military officer from the former Eastern Bloc to hold the post. At NATO, he oversaw the Alliance's response and fallout of the 2014 Russian annexation of Crimea and the 2018 Turkish invasion of Afrin, as well as efforts to tackle rising Chinese influence. Pavel retired from the military after 34 years and was discharged with honors after his term expired.

In 2021, Pavel announced his presidential bid in the 2023 election. He ran on a platform of closer cooperation with NATO allies, support for Ukraine and greater involvement in the European Union. He embraced a hawkish stance on Russia and China. Pavel won the first round of the election with 35 percent and went on to win the runoff against former Prime Minister Andrej Babiš with 58 percent of the vote, to become the fourth president of the Czech Republic and 12th president since the Czechoslovak declaration of independence in 1918. Pavel was inaugurated on 9 March 2023, succeeding Miloš Zeman. He is the second president with a military background (after Ludvík Svoboda) and the first without political experience.

In office, Pavel appointed several justices to the Constitutional Court and has been actively traveling abroad. Following the 2025 parliamentary election, Pavel swore Andrej Babiš in as prime minister, but refused to appoint Filip Turek to the cabinet, triggering a wider political conflict with the Babiš government. In June 2026, he sued the government after Babiš chose to exclude him from the 2026 NATO summit in Ankara. Pavel has enjoyed high approval ratings throughout his presidency and has expressed willingness to run for a second term.

== Early life (1961–1980) ==
Pavel was born on 1 November 1961 in Planá, then part of Czechoslovakia. His father was an intelligence officer who served at the Western Military District command in Tábor from 1973 to 1989. During grammar school, Pavel was a member of Pioneer Organization of the Socialist Youth Union. Pavel then studied at Jan Žižka Military gymnasium in Opava in 1975-1979, where he became a member of Socialist Youth Union.

== Military career (1980–2018) ==
=== Recon paratroopers and military intelligence ===
In 1979, Pavel started studies at the Military University of the Ground Forces in Vyškov. He became a professional soldier in the Czechoslovak Army in 1980 with rank of Sergeant First Class, and was promoted to Second Lieutenant in 1982.

In his graduate year of 1983, Pavel filed an application to join the Communist Party of Czechoslovakia, and he was admitted in 1985 after a two-year mandatory waiting period. In 1988 he became the chair of a local branch of the Communist Party at the Military Academy in Brno and remained a party member throughout the Velvet Revolution in November 1989.

In 1983, Pavel joined the paratroopers, serving as a leader of a reconnaissance platoon intended for operations deep behind enemy lines. Through subsequent promotions, he became a captain in charge of a paratrooper reconnaissance company in 1985.

In 1987, Pavel applied to join the Intelligence Service of the General Staff, the Czechoslovak equivalent of the Soviet GRU. Pavel joined the elite 26th Department of the Intelligence Service of the General Staff (26. oddělení ZS GŠ), whose members were being trained for espionage abroad. Pavel remained subordinate to the Military Intelligence until 1999.

After the revolution, he completed studies at the Defense Intelligence College in Bethesda, Staff College in Camberley, Royal College of Defence Studies in London, and graduated from King's College London with a master's degree in international relations.

=== United Nations Protection Force ===
Pavel served in the 1st Czechoslovak Battalion of the United Nations Protection Force in Bosnia. In January 1993, his unit was sent as part of the evacuation of Karin Base, a French military post under siege by Serbian troops. The French Army was unable to evacuate the base because the local infrastructure and bridge had been destroyed, and the unit from the combined Czech and Slovak Battalion (last Czechoslovak military unit) was sent to conduct the evacuation as they were stationed only 30 kilometres from Karin Base. Pavel went to the base with 29 soldiers and two OT-64 SKOT armoured personnel carriers. During the two-hour journey, his unit faced various obstacles that slowed down the operation, including fallen trees which soldiers had to remove from the road while under mortar fire. When the unit reached Karin Base, two French soldiers were already dead and several others wounded. Eventually, 55 French soldiers were evacuated from the base in armed transporters.

Pavel was recognized and decorated by both the Czech Republic and France for his conduct of the rescue.

=== Senior management career ===
After the operation in Bosnia, Pavel served in various positions in the Czech Army, including military intelligence and diplomacy. He represented the Czech Republic in several military diplomatic positions in Belgium, the Netherlands, and the United States.

From 1993 to 1994, Pavel was the deputy military attaché of the Czech Republic in Belgium. From 1997 to 1999, he served as the commander of 6th Special Brigade. From 1999 to 2002, he was the representative at the NATO headquarters in Brunssum. In 2003, he served as the National Military Representative at the United States Central Command at Operation Enduring Freedom headquarters in Tampa. During the U.S. invasion of Iraq in 2003, he served as a liaison officer at the U.S. headquarters in Qatar. During this time, he warned that Iraq might use weapons of mass destruction against invading forces.

Pavel was appointed brigadier general in 2002. From 2002 to 2007, he served as the commander of the specialized forces, the deputy commander of the joint forces and the deputy director of the section of the Ministry of Defence. In the years 2007–2009, he was the military representative of the Czech Republic at the European Union in Brussels, and subsequently in the years 2010–2011 was the representative of the Czech Republic at the Supreme Headquarters Allied Powers Europe in Mons. Pavel became major general in 2010 and lieutenant general in 2012. In 2011, he was a member of the expert commission that wrote the White Book on Defense, evaluating the state and proposing measures to improve the defense of the Czech Republic.

Pavel served as Deputy Chief of the General Staff of the Armed Forces of the Czech Republic from July 2011 to June 2012. On 1 June 2012, he was promoted to Chief of the General Staff. In this position, he organised cooperation between the army and academics and forums on defence and security issues.

=== Chair of the NATO Military Committee ===
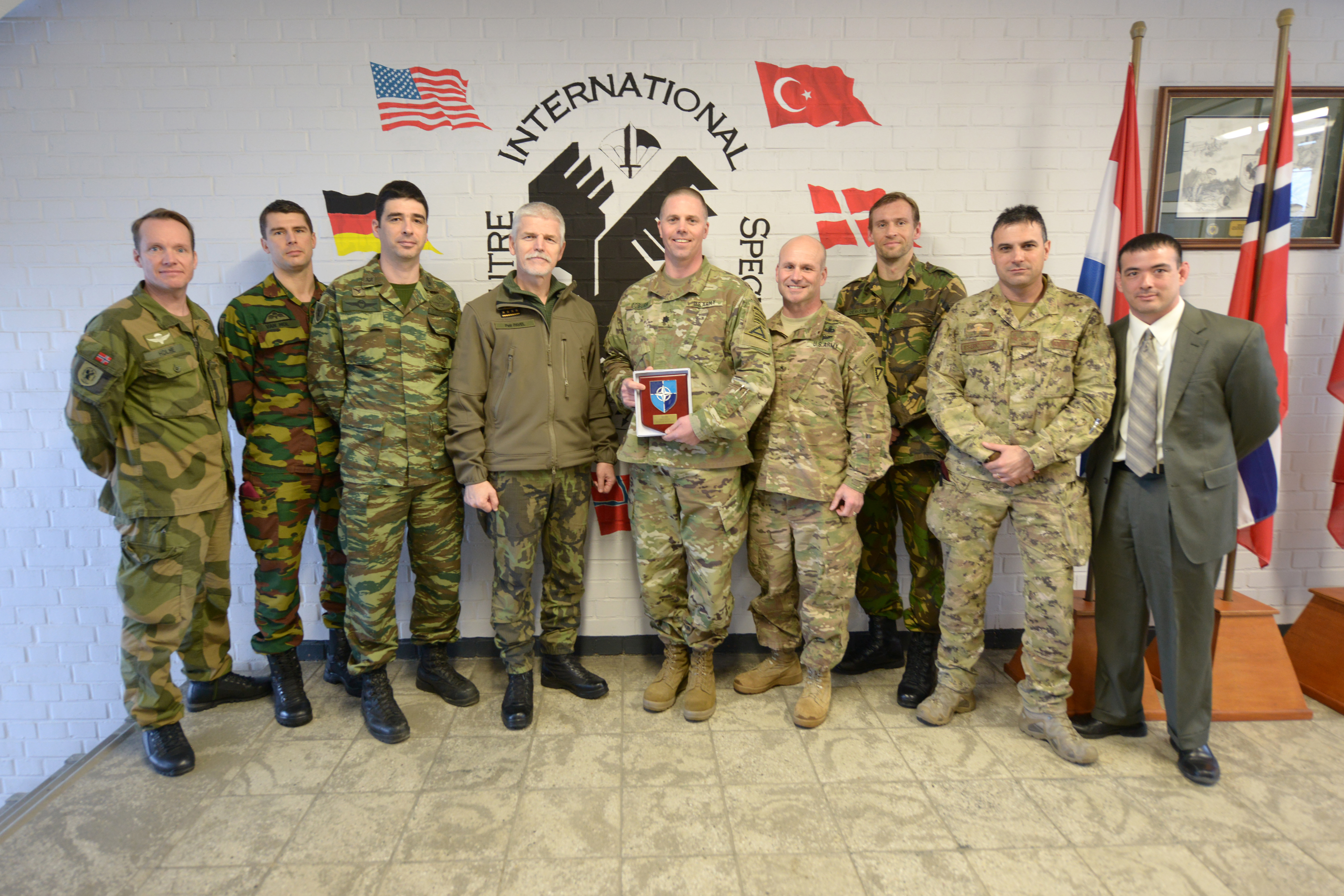
Pavel (4th from left) at the International Special Training Centre in Pfullendorf, Germany in February 2016

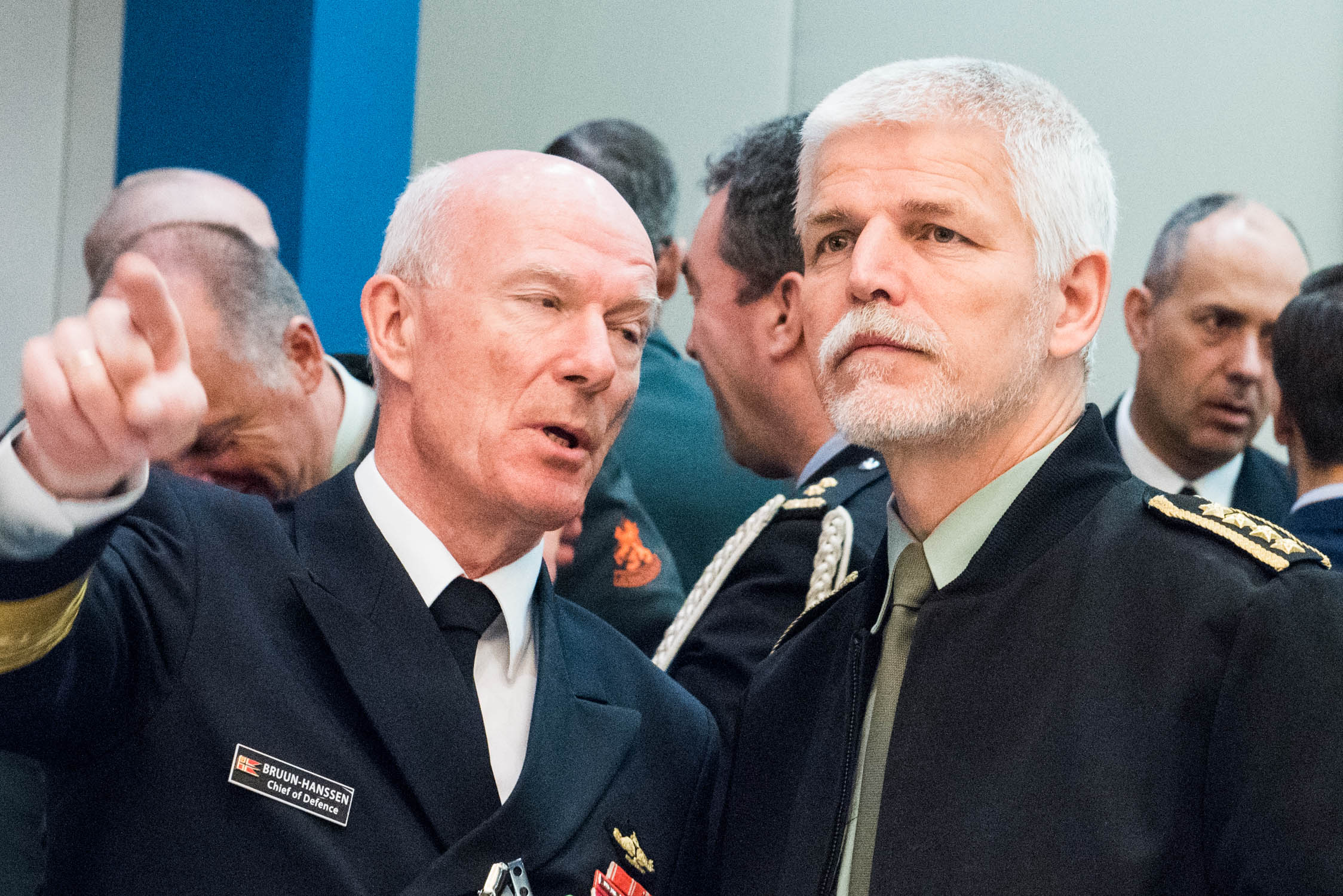
Haakon Bruun-Hanssen (left), Norway's Chief of Defence, in a discussion with Pavel in 2016

Already a general of the army, Pavel was nominated by the Cabinet of Bohuslav Sobotka as Chair of the NATO Military Committee in July 2014, and elected to this position in Vilnius in September 2014, beating candidates from Italy and Greece. He was the first chair of the organisation from a former Warsaw Pact member. His mandate commenced in 2015. During his chairmanship, Pavel had to handle the Turkish invasion of Afrin and the growing influence of China. The Islamic State (ISIS) experienced both territorial gains and losses in Iraq and Syria, while NATO's involvement in Afghanistan continued. Pavel implemented the decisions taken at the 2014 Wales summit, including the Readiness Action Plan. He reestablished dialogue with Russia, disrupted after the annexation of Crimea by the Russian Federation, even though he considered Russia a major threat.

At the end of his term of office in 2018, Jens Stoltenberg, the secretary general of NATO to whom Pavel was an advisor, commended Pavel for leading the Military Committee with great distinction during a key period in NATO's history. He was awarded the Commander of the Legion of Merit for his work in the Military Committee.

== Retirement from the army (2018–2022) ==
Following his departure from the army in 2018, Pavel became a lecturer and consultant, and participated in the conferences of the Aspen Institute.

In 2019, Pavel co-founded the association 'Pro bezpečnou budoucnost' ("For a safe future"), together with diplomat Petr Kolář, entrepreneur František Vrabel, and manager Radek Hokovský.

On 6 April 2020, Pavel launched the 'Spolu silnější' (Stronger Together) initiative, with the aim of helping people linked with the fight against the COVID-19 pandemic in the Czech Republic, especially crowdfunding financial assistance for volunteers helping in hospitals and creating medical tools. The initiative also aimed to prepare the country for future crises.

Pavel gathered various experts in the initiative including head of the State Office for Nuclear Safety Dana Drábová, businessman Martin Hausenblas, president of the Czech Society of Emergency Medicine and Disaster Medicine Jana Šeblová, and former governor of the Olomouc Region Jan Březina. Pavel started travelling around Czech regions and gathering information about the fight against the epidemic from experts, authorities and institutions. Based on the initiative's findings, Pavel met Prime Minister Andrej Babiš to present him an anti-crisis plan created by the initiative.

Some political commentators such as Petr Holec and Ondřej Leinert linked the initiative to Pavel's potential presidential bid, noting similarities with Hillary Clinton's slogan during the 2016 United States presidential election.

== 2023 presidential campaign ==
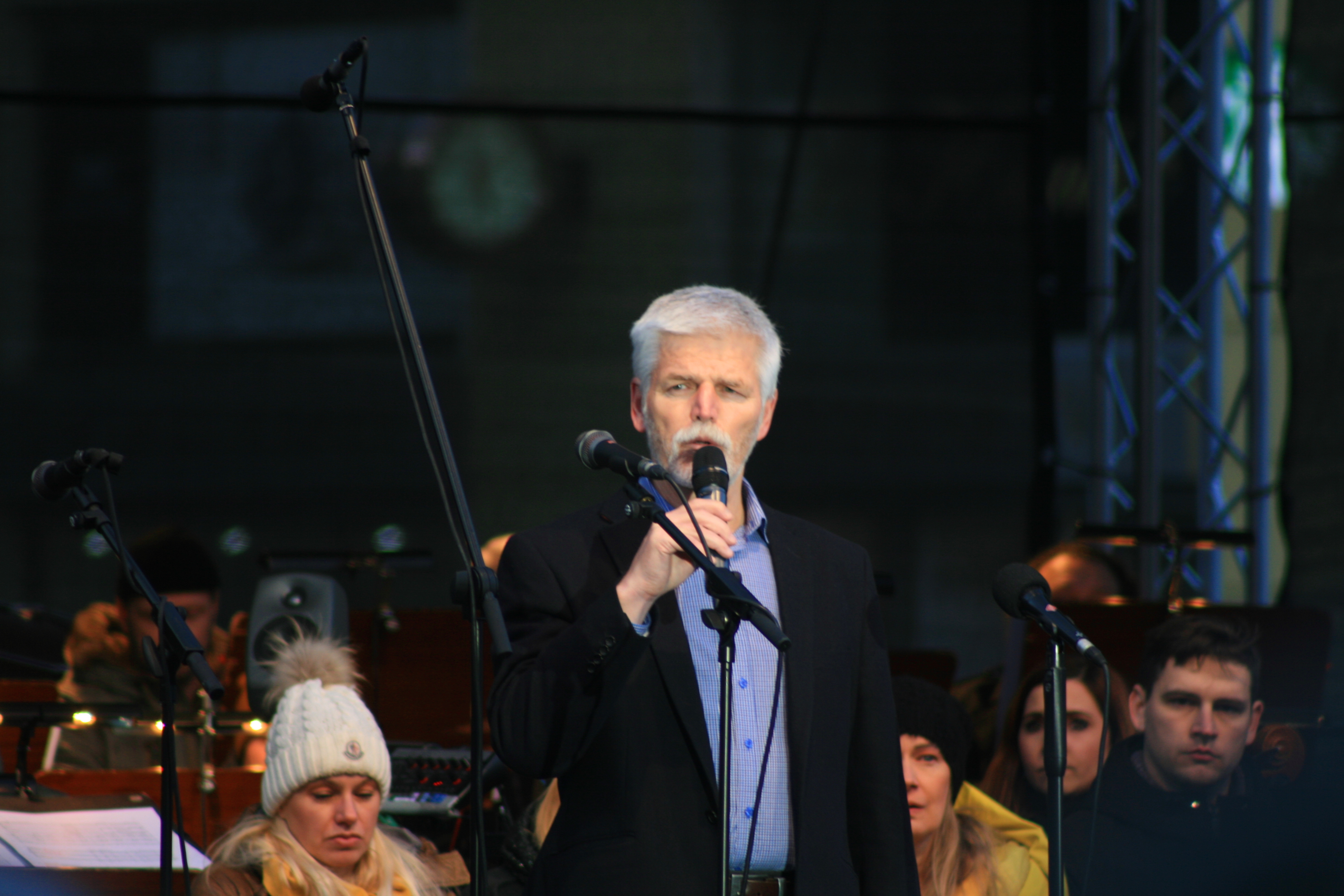
Pavel during a rally in support of Ukraine in Brno, March 2022

In 2019, leaders of the Civic Democratic Party, KDU-ČSL, TOP 09, Mayors and Independents, and Czech Pirate Party met to discuss potential candidates for the next presidential election. Pavel was reported to be the most discussed candidate at the meeting.

On 29 June 2022, Pavel announced his intention to run in the 2023 Czech presidential election. He said he wanted to win the election so that the Czech Republic would not have to feel embarrassed by its president. Pavel launched his official campaign on 6 September 2022, saying he wanted to "return order and peace to the Czech Republic", running on a pro-Western, pro-European, and anti-populist platform, the views he advocated for throughout his senior military management career. On 4 October 2022, he was one of three candidates endorsed by the Spolu electoral alliance (the Civic Democratic Party, KDU-ČSL, and TOP 09).

During the campaign, Pavel referred to his membership in the Communist Party as a mistake, and his supporters pointed out that after the Velvet revolution, he had gained the trust of former dissidents such as Luboš Dobrovský and Radovan Procházka.

The first round was held on 13 and 14 January 2023. Pavel received 1,975,056 votes (35.4%). He finished narrowly ahead of former Czech prime minister Andrej Babiš, with whom he advanced to the second round. Pavel defeated Babiš in the second round on 28 January, receiving 58.32% of the vote to Babiš's 41.67%. On the same day, the president of Slovakia Zuzana Čaputová personally congratulated him on his victory in Prague. Pavel succeeded outgoing president Miloš Zeman on 9 March.

Pavel was planning to make his first foreign trips to Slovakia, Poland and Ukraine to reassure the Czech Republic's international commitments and express support for Ukraine against the 2022 Russian invasion. Polish president Andrzej Duda and Ukrainian president Volodymyr Zelenskyy were also the first foreign leaders he spoke to as president-elect. He also had a telephone conversation with Taiwanese President Tsai Ing-wen in the first days after the election to reaffirm the closer diplomatic relations between the Czech Republic and Taiwan, triggering criticism from China.

== Presidency (2023–present) ==
=== Domestic policy ===
Pavel was inaugurated as president on 9 March 2023. In his inaugural address, he emphasized dignity, respect and decency, and stated that he would like to participate in the creation of a common vision for the Czech Republic. His first presidential trip was to Slovakia, where he met President Zuzana Čaputová, Prime Minister Eduard Heger, and the Speaker of the National Council, Boris Kollár.

During his first 100 days in office, Pavel worked to open Prague Castle to the public, improve the communication and decision-making of the presidential office, and sought to mediate and find common ground on key domestic political issues between the government and the opposition. Pavel appointed three judges to the Constitutional Court, and addressed sessions of the Chamber of Deputies and the Senate. Political analysts praised his symbolism and open communication with the public. At the same time, Pavel faced criticism for his new system of appointing judges to the Czech Constitutional Court, as critics argued that his advisory board was playing too large a role in selecting candidates. Although Pavel presented the process as more transparent, it was criticized due to the decisions still being made behind closed doors, making the selection less transparent than promised. Some scholars also argued that constitutional court appointments are inherently political and should not be treated as purely expert-driven decisions. Additionally, some senators believe they were excluded from the pre-selection process. Despite these criticisms, the Senate approved all of Pavel's nominees. One of his nominees, Robert Fremr, withdrew his Constitutional Court nomination after criticism of his communist-era rulings raised public doubts about his integrity, which was seen as embarrassing for Pavel.

==== Dispute with Babiš government ====
In May 2025, before the 2025 Czech parliamentary elections, Pavel said that he may refuse to appoint ministers who support the Czech Republic's withdrawal from NATO or the European Union. In the aftermath of the elections, Pavel held meetings with the leaders of all parties that made it into parliament. On 6 October 2025, Pavel said it was "clear" that there was interest in forming a coalition government composed of ANO, SPD, and AUTO. On 27 October 2025, Pavel asked Babiš to form a government. Babiš met Pavel on 26 November to present his cabinet and proposed government ministers. Pavel stated that he would appoint Babiš as the new prime minister within a week of him publicly addressing his business interests, and also expressed his ongoing disagreement with the nomination of Filip Turek as the candidate for Minister of Environment. AUTO leader Macinka stated that he saw no legal reasons why Turek could not be appointed minister. Babiš announced on Facebook on 5 December that he would shift his holding company Agrofert to an independently governed trust structure, and in response Pavel agreed to appoint him as Prime Minister, which he did on 9 December at Prague Castle.

Babiš submitted a new proposed cabinet to Pavel, from which Filip Turek was omitted, citing health reasons. Babiš' cabinet was appointed by Pavel on 15 December 2025. On 22 December 2025, Turek and Pavel met for further discussions, but Turek was unable to convince Pavel to withdraw his objections to Turek's appointment. Pavel said he expected Babiš not to propose Turek for the post, and said he may reject Turek's nomination if it is proposed. Macinka stated that the Motorists' position on Turek's nomination remained the same, and they will ask Babiš to propose Turek as environment minister. On 7 January 2026, Pavel hosted Babiš at a traditional New Year's lunch at Prague Castle. Babiš again submitted the nomination of Turek for environment minister, but Pavel refused to appoint him. The Motorists insisted on Turek's nomination and criticised what it described as "the president's approach to his constitutional duties." In a letter to Babiš, Pavel said he must protect fundamental constitutional values, including the rejection of totalitarian ideologies, arguing that Turek's past statements and conduct cast doubt on his loyalty to those values, such as remarks that praised or downplayed Nazi Germany, and that Turek had repeatedly shown a lack of respect for the Czech legal order. Protests were held expressing support for Pavel in the dispute. Turek said Pavel's reasoning had deeply offended him and he would file a lawsuit for protection of personality rights. On 12 January 2026, Turek was appointed government commissioner for climate policy. On 16 January 2026, MPs from the governing coalition urged Pavel to appoint ministers proposed by the prime minister, in reference to Turek. Babiš stated that he would not submit the nomination of Turek for environment minister again, because Pavel would not appoint him anyway. Babiš further said he was not considering a competence lawsuit over Pavel's refusal to appoint Turek as the presidency could be granted additional powers by the Constitutional Court.

In June 2026 Pavel was initially excluded from the Czech government's delegation to the NATO summit in Ankara, with the Babiš government arguing that executive authority over foreign policy rests with the cabinet. Pavel challenged the decision before the Constitutional Court, which issued an interim ruling requiring the government to ensure his participation while the case is reviewed. Following the ruling, Pavel announced that he would lead the Czech delegation and decide which summit events to attend. He described the dispute as originating from his refusal to appoint Filip Turek as a minister, and said it had strengthened his determination to seek a second term in 2028. Foreign Minister Petr Macinka criticized the court's intervention, saying it was an "attempted constitutional coup", while acknowledging that the government would comply with the interim ruling and accredit Pavel. Macinka maintained that Babiš would lead the Czech delegation and that the government would decide what role Pavel should have.

==== Approval ratings ====
After Pavel took office, public trust in the president rose by 20% to 58%, the highest in several years. In 2026, three years after his inauguration, it was still at 57%, which analysts attributed to Pavel's engaged role in appointing the Babis government. At the same time, almost half of those surveyed said he was interfering excessively in the political system.

=== Foreign policy ===
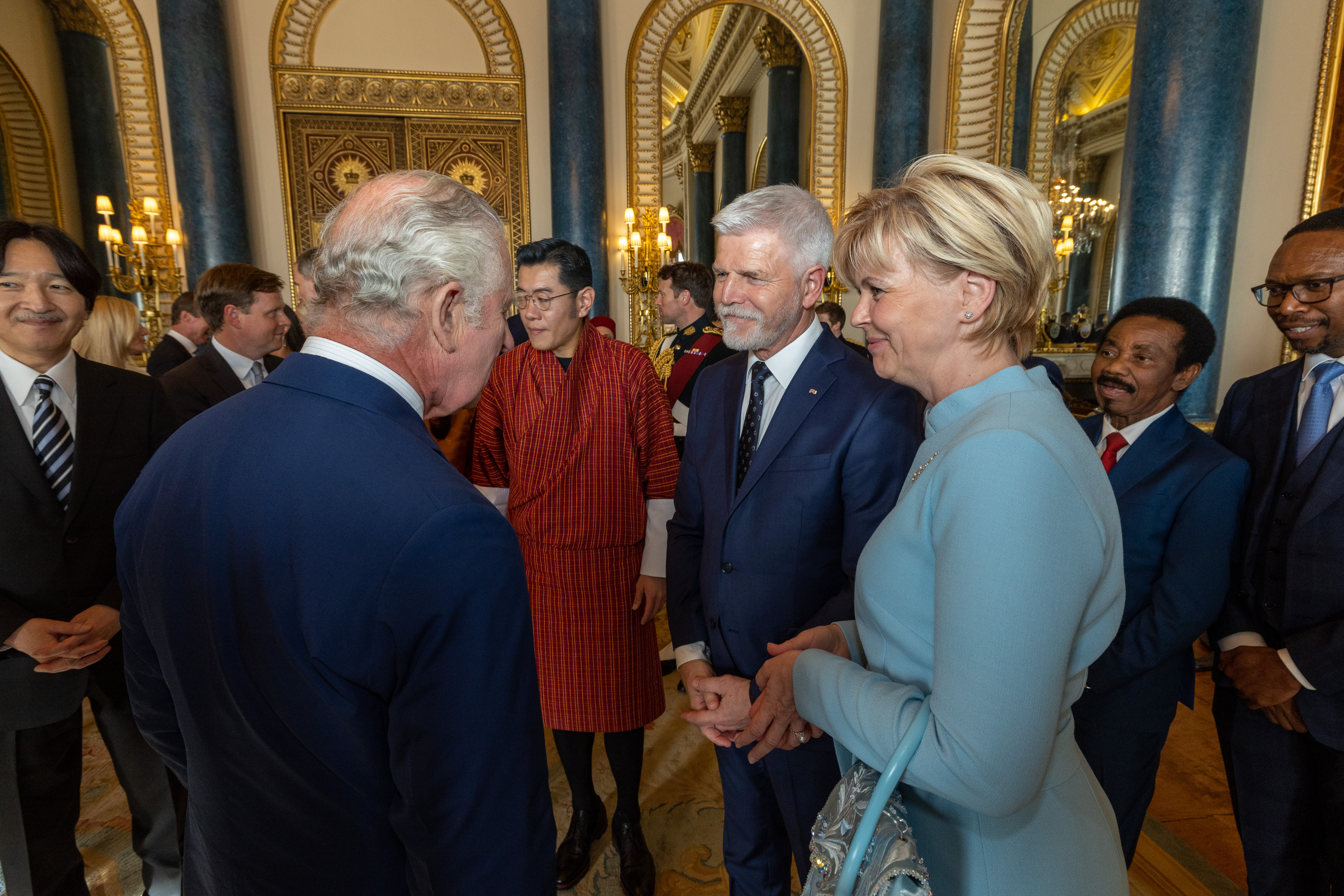
Petr Pavel and his wife during a Charles III reception at Buckingham Palace, May 2023

Before the inauguration, Pavel gave a number of interviews to both domestic and foreign media organizations. He spoke with several leaders, including Ukrainian President Volodymyr Zelenskyy, Polish President Andrzej Duda and Taiwanese President Tsai Ing-wen becoming the first elected European head of state to talk to the Taiwanese president on the phone in recent history.

As president-elect, he attended the Munich Security Conference where he met French President Emmanuel Macron and Austrian President Alexander Van der Bellen, among others. He then visited Karlovy Vary Region and Ústí nad Labem Region.

Pavel visited all neighboring countries (Slovakia, Poland, Germany and Austria) by June 2023. He proposed deepening co-operation between the Czech Republic and Germany, and made steps to improve relations between the Czech Republic and the Sudetendeutsche Landsmannschaft. His visit to Bavaria for the Bavarian-Czech Friendship Weeks in May 2023 on a motorcycle attracted considerable attention.

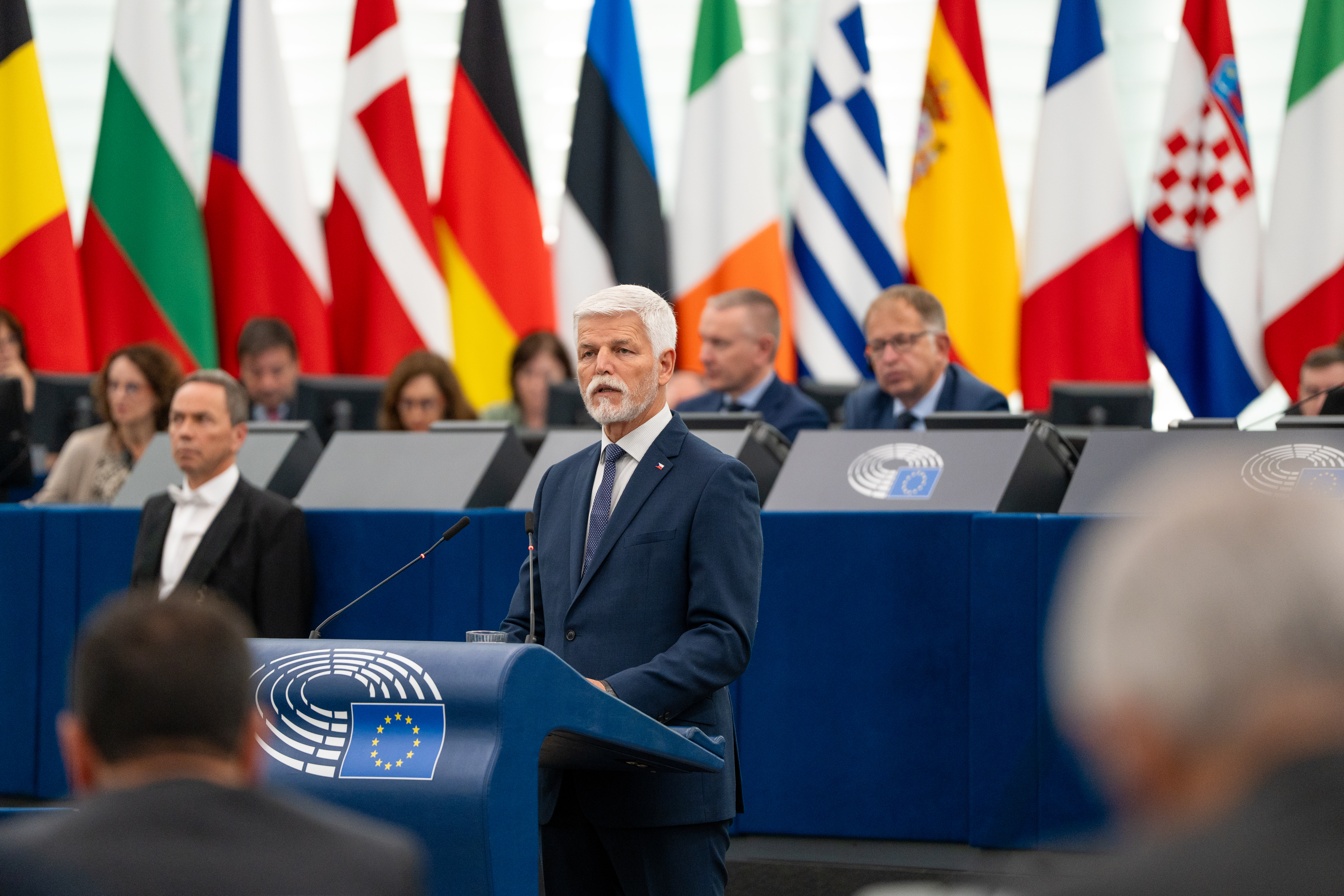
Pavel addressing the European Parliament, October 2023

Pavel has been a vocal supporter of Ukraine in its war against Russia, rallying for a continued united Western stance. In April 2023, he was the first foreign president to visit eastern Ukraine since the war began, offering Czech support in the reconstruction of Dnipropetrovsk Oblast. In June 2023, in an interview for Radio Free Europe, Pavel spoke in favor of enhanced surveillance of all Russian citizens living in the West. When elaborating, he invoked the treatment of Japanese Americans during World War II. His words were met with criticism from the Russian opposition and media. Pavel later clarified that he was talking about necessary security measures to prevent attacks like the 2014 Vrbětice ammunition warehouses explosions and the spread of Russian propaganda, not surveillance on an individual level, and that he did not approve of the treatment of Japanese Americans. Following the initial interview, Vyacheslav Volodin, the speaker of the Russian State Duma, misrepresented Pavel's words and urged Russians living in the West to return to Russia if feasible, saying they were at risk of being sent to concentration camps.

In 2023, Pavel delivered speeches at, among others, the 4th Council of Europe Summit, the 78th session of the UN General Assembly, the Climate Ambition Summit, the UN Security Council and the European Parliament, calling for a fight against populism, for explaining to citizens the principles on which Europe stands, for resisting war fatigue and making no concessions to Russia. At the SDG Summit he presented a statement on behalf of the 46 member states of the Pathfinders for Peaceful, Just and Inclusive Societies.

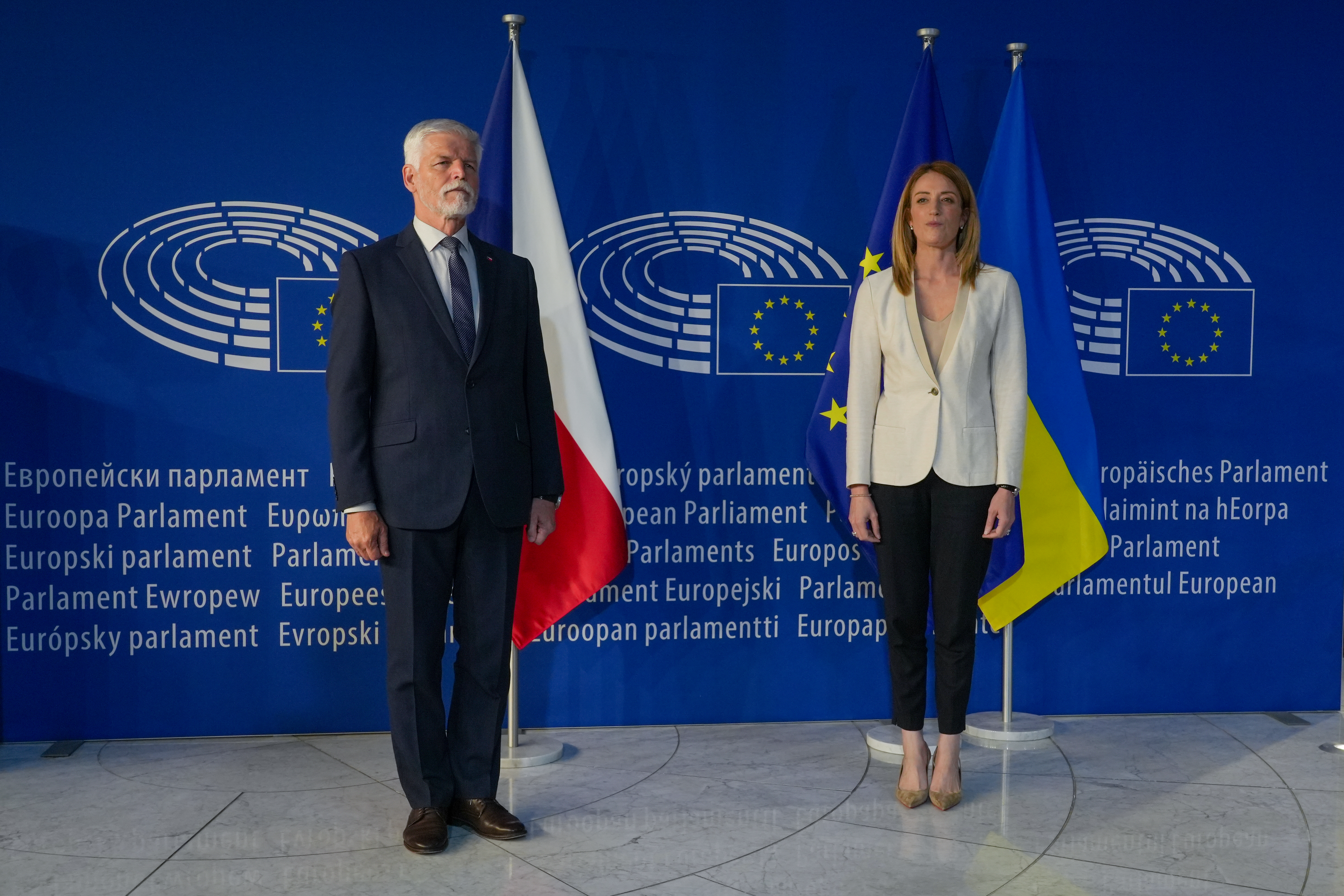
Pavel with European Parliament President Roberta Metsola in 2023

On 15 January 2024, Pavel visited Israel to express solidarity with the country during the Gaza war. There were protests in Prague against his visit to Israel. After meeting with Israeli politicians, Pavel said that he supports a two-state solution. He then visited Qatar, where he discussed the Israeli-Palestinian conflict with Qatar's Emir Tamim bin Hamad Al Thani.

On 6 February 2025, Pavel signed a bill that prohibits Russian nationals from obtaining Czech citizenship, even if they have lived in the Czech Republic for a long time, which critics denounced as discriminatory and contrary to European values.

On 21 May 2025, Pavel issued a presidential pardon halting the criminal prosecution of four members of the Czech Army's 601st Special Forces Group. The soldiers had been investigated in connection with the death of Afghan soldier Vahidullah Khan in 2018, following an insider attack at the Shindand Air Base in Afghanistan that resulted in the death of a Czech dog handler and injuries to two others. The charges, which included extortion and dereliction of duty, stemmed from allegations concerning the treatment of the captured Afghan suspect. Pavel justified the pardons by citing the extraordinary and complex wartime conditions, the non-violent nature of the alleged offences, and the protracted length of the investigation. The decision, endorsed by the Czech government, was a rare example of presidential clemency in military matters.

On 17 July 2025, Pavel signed a comprehensive amendment to the Czech Criminal Code that criminalizes public support for Communism, legally equating it with Nazi propaganda. While the law passed with wide parliamentary support, it drew criticism from the Communist Party of Bohemia and Moravia, which described it as a politically motivated attempt to silence opposition.

On 27 July 2025, Pavel met with the Dalai Lama to congratulate him on his 90th birthday during a private visit to India, prompting the Chinese government to suspend official relations with him on 12 August.

Following the March 2026 US-Israeli strikes on Iran, Pavel condemned the Iranian regime’s human rights violations, support for terrorism, and backing of Russia's war in Ukraine.

== Political views ==
=== Foreign policy ===
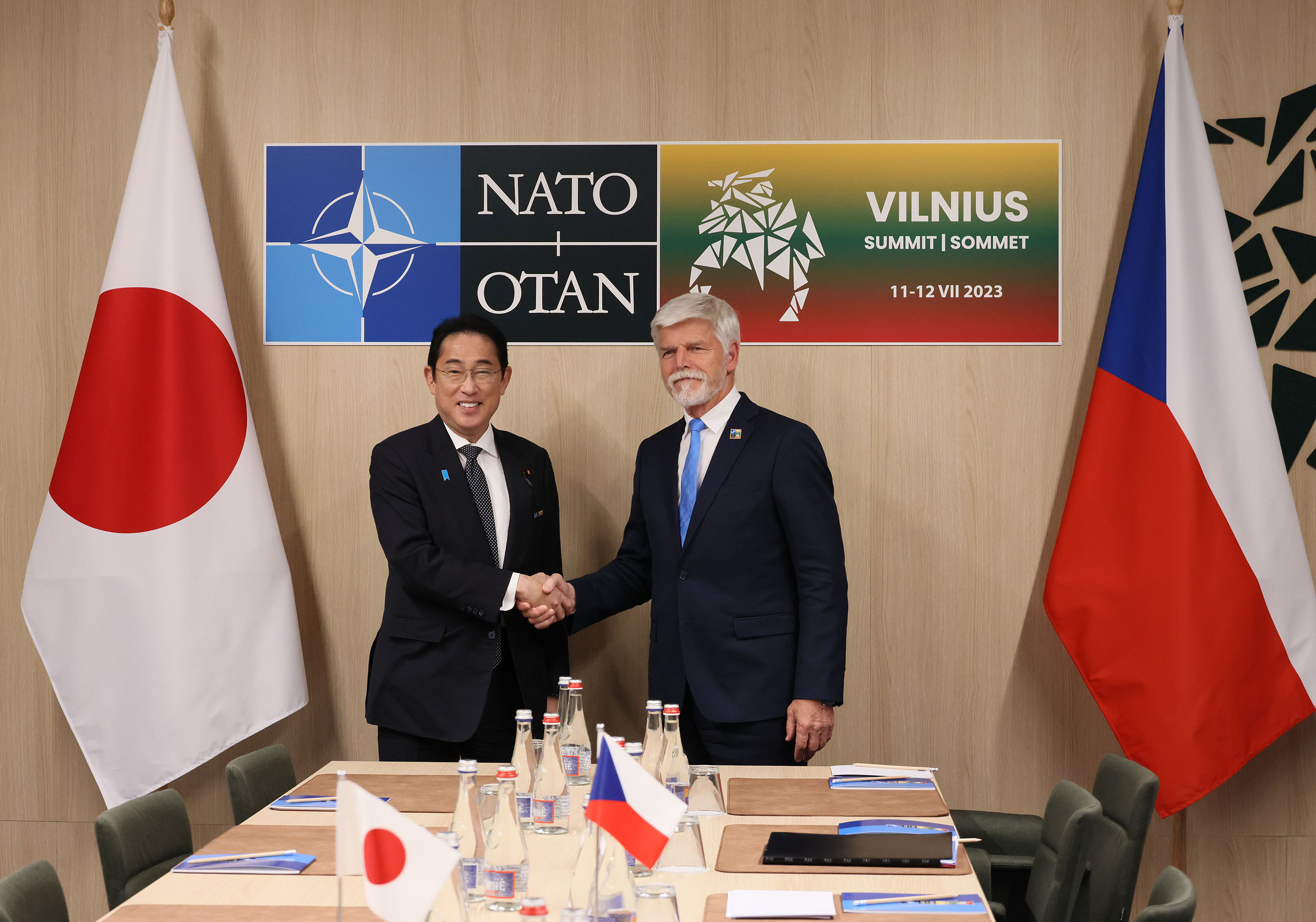
Pavel meeting with Japanese Prime Minister Fumio Kishida at the 2023 NATO Summit in Vilnius

Pavel holds Atlanticist and pro-Western views and advocates active Czech membership in the European Union and NATO. In April 2026, he said that the creation of a United States of Europe is "almost inevitable" and might be necessary in response to Europe getting caught between the increasing brinkmanship between Russia, China and the United States.

In 1987, in his biography, Pavel expressed understanding for the invasion of Czechoslovakia by Warsaw Pact troops. He is said to have taken this view at the age of six from his father, Josef Pavel, who was at the time an officer in the Czechoslovak Army and a member of military intelligence. Pavel later apologized for the stance expressed in his biography and condemned the invasion.

Asked if he would have fought against the West in the event of a war before November 1989, Pavel said that "a soldier defends his country and the people who live in it. ... every soldier fights for the people he likes and for whom it is worth sacrificing his life".

In 2015, Pavel called for a balanced and pragmatic approach to international security. Originally rejecting hawkish positions, he opposed immediate arms deliveries to Ukraine during the conflict with Russia, warning that such moves could escalate violence. Instead, he advocated for strengthening Ukraine's defense capacity over time and supported a broader NATO strategy that combined deterrence with diplomacy. Pavel also stressed the need for post-conflict planning in military interventions and highlighted the complexity of counterinsurgency operations, arguing that success requires not just military strength but also political and societal engagement. In later years, particularly following Russia's full-scale invasion of Ukraine in 2022, Pavel adopted a more assertive stance, publicly supporting strong military aid to Ukraine and a firmer deterrent posture within NATO.

As Chairman of the NATO Military Committee in 2018, Pavel said of the Turkish invasion of Afrin: "Turkey is a target of terrorism and has the right to defend itself." He said it was necessary not to view the Kurds as a homogeneous group, and that some of them were effectively fighting extremists.

During his presidency, Petr Pavel adopted a more assertive Czech foreign policy toward China, with a particular emphasis on deepening ties with Taiwan. Shortly after his election in 2023, he held a phone call with Taiwanese President Tsai Ing-wen, becoming the first European head of state to do so. He described Taiwan as a democratic partner and expressed interest in closer cooperation. Although he affirmed respect for the One China policy, his actions reflected a more independent interpretation focused on shared democratic values. The call was sharply criticized by Beijing. Pavel’s position followed a precedent set by Czech Senate leaders Jaroslav Kubera and Miloš Vystrčil, the latter of whom visited Taiwan in 2020 and publicly affirmed support for Taiwanese sovereignty. As president, Pavel hosted Taiwanese officials, warned of Chinese cyber threats, and supported intelligence claims of attempted Chinese intimidation during official visits, signaling a cautious but firm stance toward Beijing. He met the 14th Dalai Lama on 27 July 2025 in India, and advocated for the Middle Way Approach.

In 2025, Pavel maintained the Czech Republic’s support for Israel as a state but drew a clear line between that support and the actions of Prime Minister Benjamin Netanyahu’s government. He criticized the Israeli leadership for lacking a broader political vision in Gaza, warning that its military-heavy approach risked deepening the humanitarian crisis and further destabilizing the region. Pavel expressed concern over Netanyahu’s reliance on radical coalition partners, suggesting this alliance influenced Israel’s hardline policies. He called for an urgent resolution to the humanitarian situation in Gaza, stressed the need to ensure safe delivery of aid, and announced plans to initiate a national debate on the Czech position toward the conflict. His remarks stood out in the context of Czech politics, where strong support for Israel is the norm, though a few others, including Senate President Miloš Vystrčil, voiced similar unease over the scale of civilian suffering. Pavel expressed the belief that a negotiated two-state solution as the only sustainable resolution to the Israeli-Palestinian conflict.

==== Russian invasion of Ukraine ====
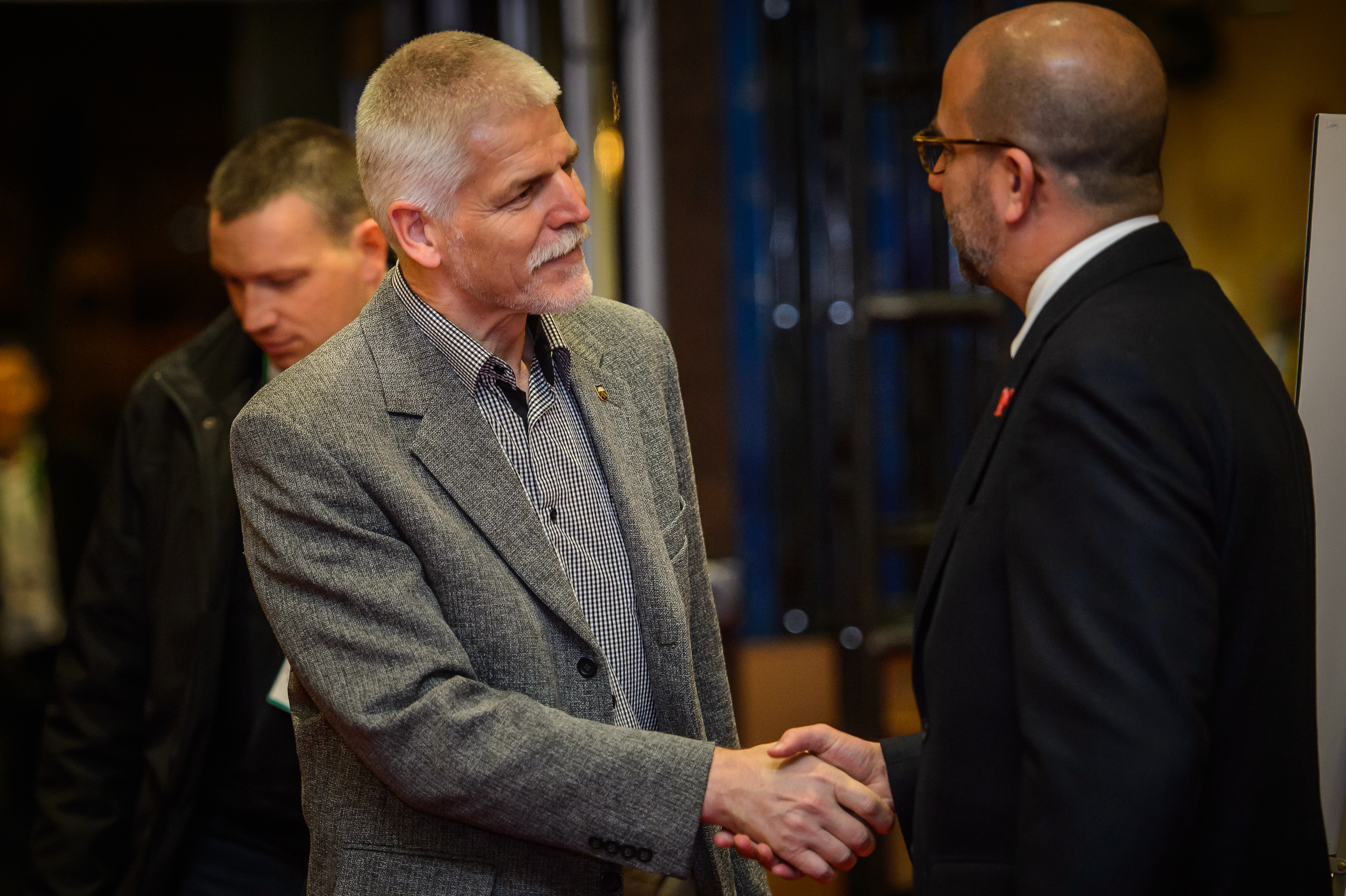
Pavel with Charles Michel, the prime minister of Belgium, at the 2015 Halifax International Security Forum

Pavel supported Ukraine during the 2022 Russian invasion, which he described as a "war against the system of international relations", calling for military and humanitarian aid. He said that the West should have acted more forcefully in response to the invasion. He argued that following the annexation of Crimea by Russia and the control of parts of the Donbas by Russian-backed separatists, the West should have established protected corridors for civilians enforced by the OSCE. Once the invasion began, he initially expressed the view that the Russian army would be able to hold what they had occupied, and Ukraine would not have sufficient resources to push out the Russian military, including Crimea, even with the help of Western countries. In December 2022, he stated that Ukraine could win the war and pointed to the importance of aid to Ukraine for the security of the Czech Republic. In 2023, Pavel reiterated his support for Ukraine joining the NATO alliance after the end of the war.

In April 2023, he stated that it was in China's interest to prolong the Russo-Ukrainian war because "it can push Russia to a number of concessions."

Following accusations that the Czech Republic would be mobilized and directly involved in the war in Ukraine if he won the second round presidential election, Pavel stated:

"I know what war is and I certainly don't wish it on anyone. The first thing I would do is try to keep the country as far away from war as possible. But I'm not saying that keeping a country as far away from war as possible means resigning yourself to bad things that are happening. Because if we just watch, the war will come to us too. ... Soldiers do not start wars. Politicians start them, and then soldiers solve it for them."

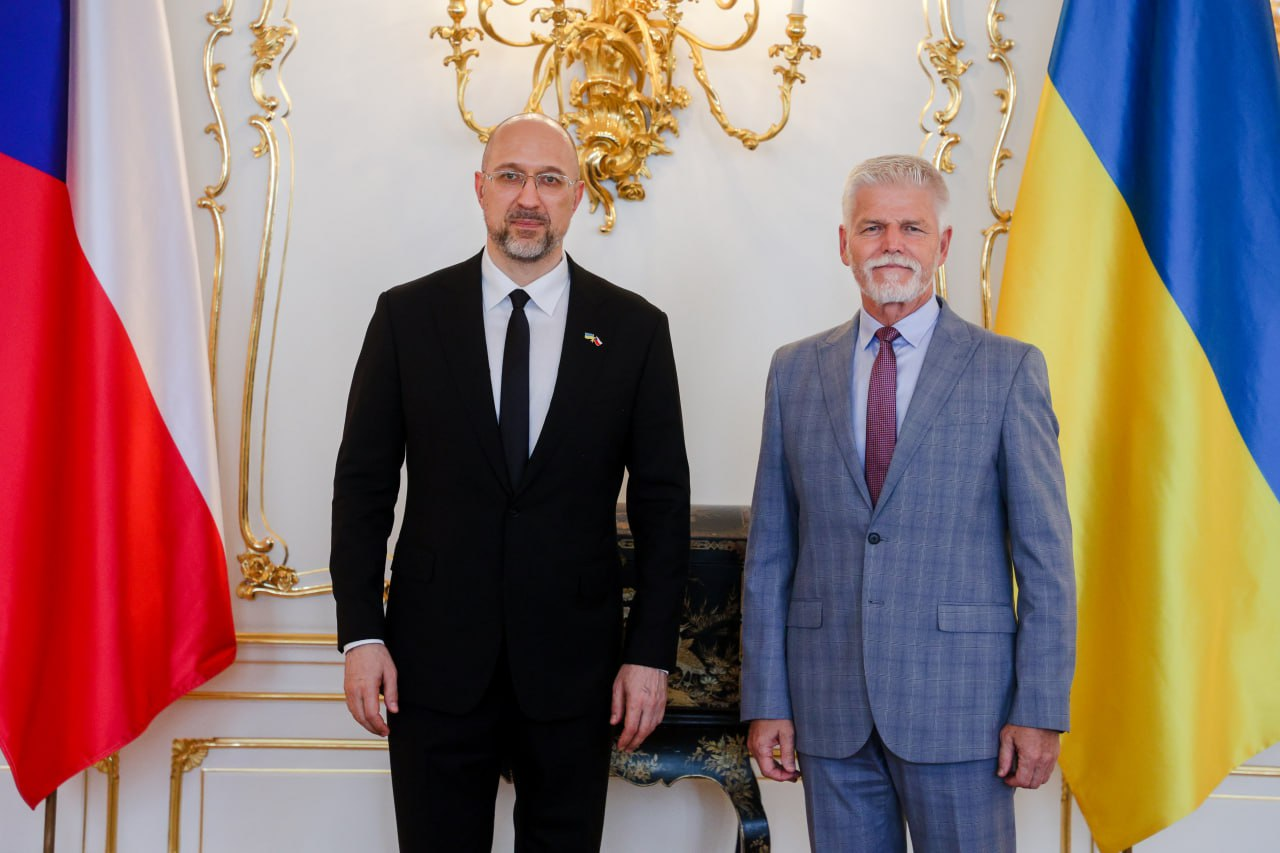
Pavel with Ukrainian Prime Minister Denys Shmyhal, 16 July 2024

In May 2023, Pavel called for the donation of L-159 fighter jets to Ukraine.

In an August 2024 interview with Darius Rochebin in Paris, Pavel repeatedly stressed that the Charter of the United Nations gives states the right of self-defence, and furthermore that this right is unconditional. His position was clear that the west should not limit Ukraine's ability to defend itself, technologically or geographically. Pavel said that the Czech ammunition coalition had supplied 500,000 shells to that date.

=== Social issues ===
Pavel holds progressive views on socio-cultural issues. He supports same-sex marriage and same-sex adoption, and confirmed he would not veto a law permitting recognition of same-sex unions in the Czech Republic. Pavel supports the introduction of euthanasia, and rejects the death penalty.

After his election as Chair of the NATO Military Committee in 2014, Pavel criticised political correctness, arguing that it creates an environment in which those in charge are told only what they want to hear. He said that during his tenure as Chair of the NATO Military Committee he saw many Chiefs of General Staff who were unable to call problems by their right name due to political correctness.

As president, Pavel advocated for the Czech Republic to ratify the Istanbul Convention, a Council of Europe treaty aimed at preventing and combating violence against women and domestic abuse.

=== Domestic policy ===
During the presidential campaign, Pavel described himself as "right of centre, with a strong social emphasis". In 2019, he argued that rich people should pay higher taxes and supports stronger redistribution of wealth. He has cited Scandinavian countries as an inspiration. He said he voted for the centre-right Spolu alliance in the 2021 Czech parliamentary election. He discussed political support from Spolu during the early stages of his presidential bid, eventually stating that he did not want to be its nominee, but would welcome its endorsement. Spolu endorsed him in October 2022 together with two other candidates. Pavel said he had voted for Karel Schwarzenberg in both rounds of the 2013 Czech presidential election. In the 2018 Czech presidential election, he voted for Pavel Fischer in the first round and Jiří Drahoš in the second.

== Personal life ==
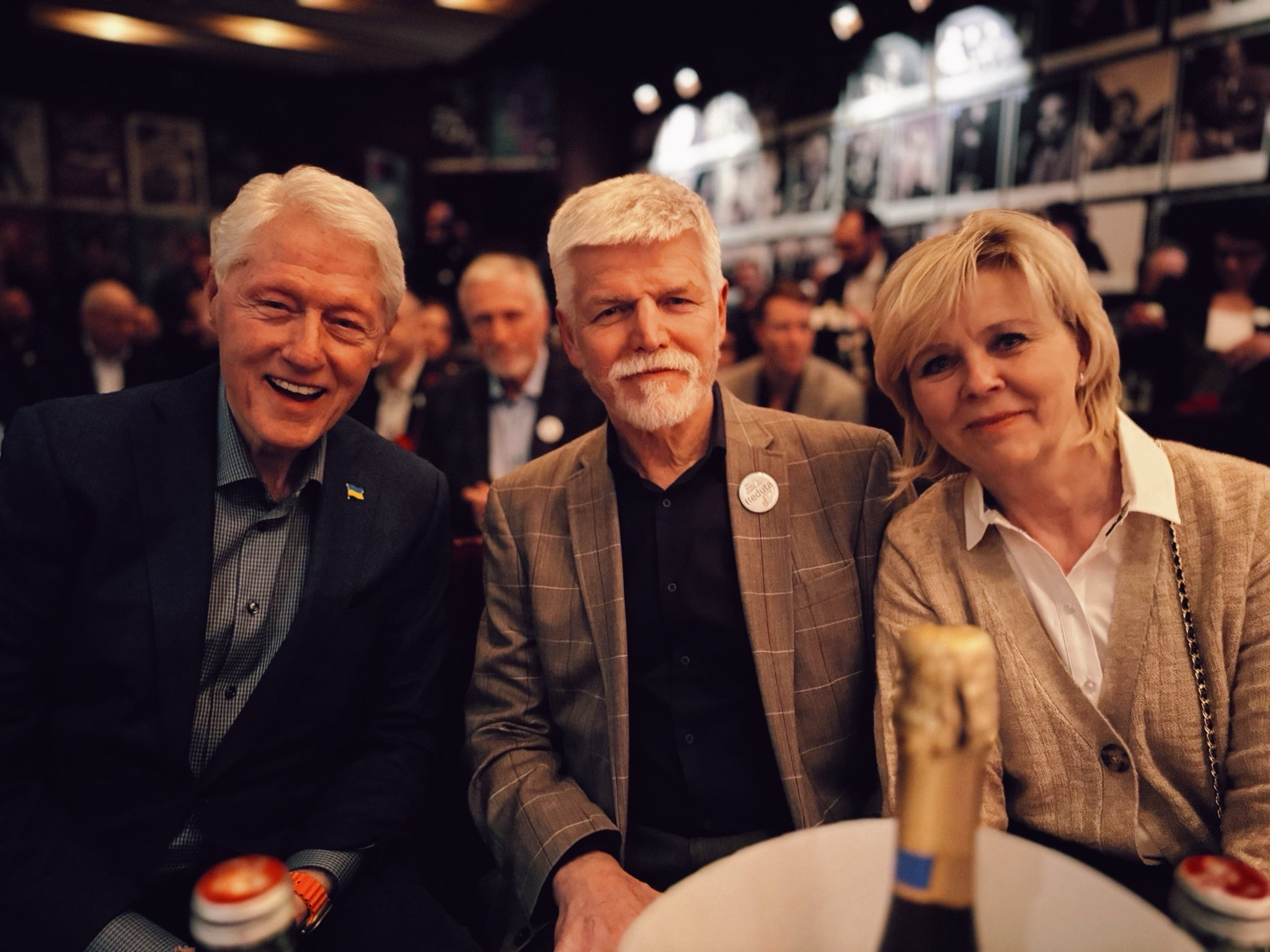
Pavel, his wife Eva Pavlová and Bill Clinton in March 2024

Pavel speaks Czech, English, French, and Russian. He has two sons by his first wife, Hana; they later divorced. He is married to his second wife, Eva Pavlová, who holds the rank of lieutenant colonel in the Czech Army. Before 2012, Pavel moved to Černouček, where he has lived ever since. Pavel holds a concealed carry license.

He is an atheist.

=== Motoring ===
Motorsport is among Pavel's favourite pastimes, and he frequently attends races and organises events related to auto and motorcycle racing. In 2025, he test drove a NASCAR Euro Series car at Autodrom Most and a Toyota GR Yaris at the Meeting of Champions in Sosnová. Pavel has also spoken with the racing industry in an official capacity, such as meeting Fédération Internationale de l'Automobile president Mohammed Ben Sulayem and Toyota Gazoo Racing Europe executives in June 2026 to discuss road safety and developing Europe's automotive field, respectively.

He is an avid motorcyclist. In May 2024, Pavel was hospitalized after suffering light injuries in an accident while riding his motorcycle. He also led the 2025 Czech Republic motorcycle Grand Prix parade into Brno Circuit on his BMW F900GS.

Pavel is also a longtime fan of the Dakar Rally. He attended the 2025 race during a private trip to Saudi Arabia, following from a media vehicle and staying in the bivouac alongside racers. One of the participating race trucks, the Tatra FF7 of Tomáš Vrátný, was christened by Pavel during its unveiling at the 2024 Colours of Ostrava. In April 2025, he and Pavlová hosted a reception at Lány Castle for Czech Dakar teams.

As a hobby photographer, Pavel frequently joins official media in taking photos of motor-racing events. He said in 2025 that "motorsport is a fascinating world and I am happy to not only follow it, but also record it in some way and share it with others." Major events he has photographed include Dakar, MotoGP in Brno, NASCAR and the Superbike World Championship in Most, 24 Hours of Le Mans, and the Hungarian Grand Prix. His pictures from the 2025 Dakar Rally were put on display at the National Technical Museum in March as part of an exhibition titled In the Desert with a Finger on the Trigger. In late 2025, Pavel auctioned off an album of his racing images from the year, raising 668,555 Kč for the Eva Pavlová Foundation.

== Honours ==
=== National honours ===
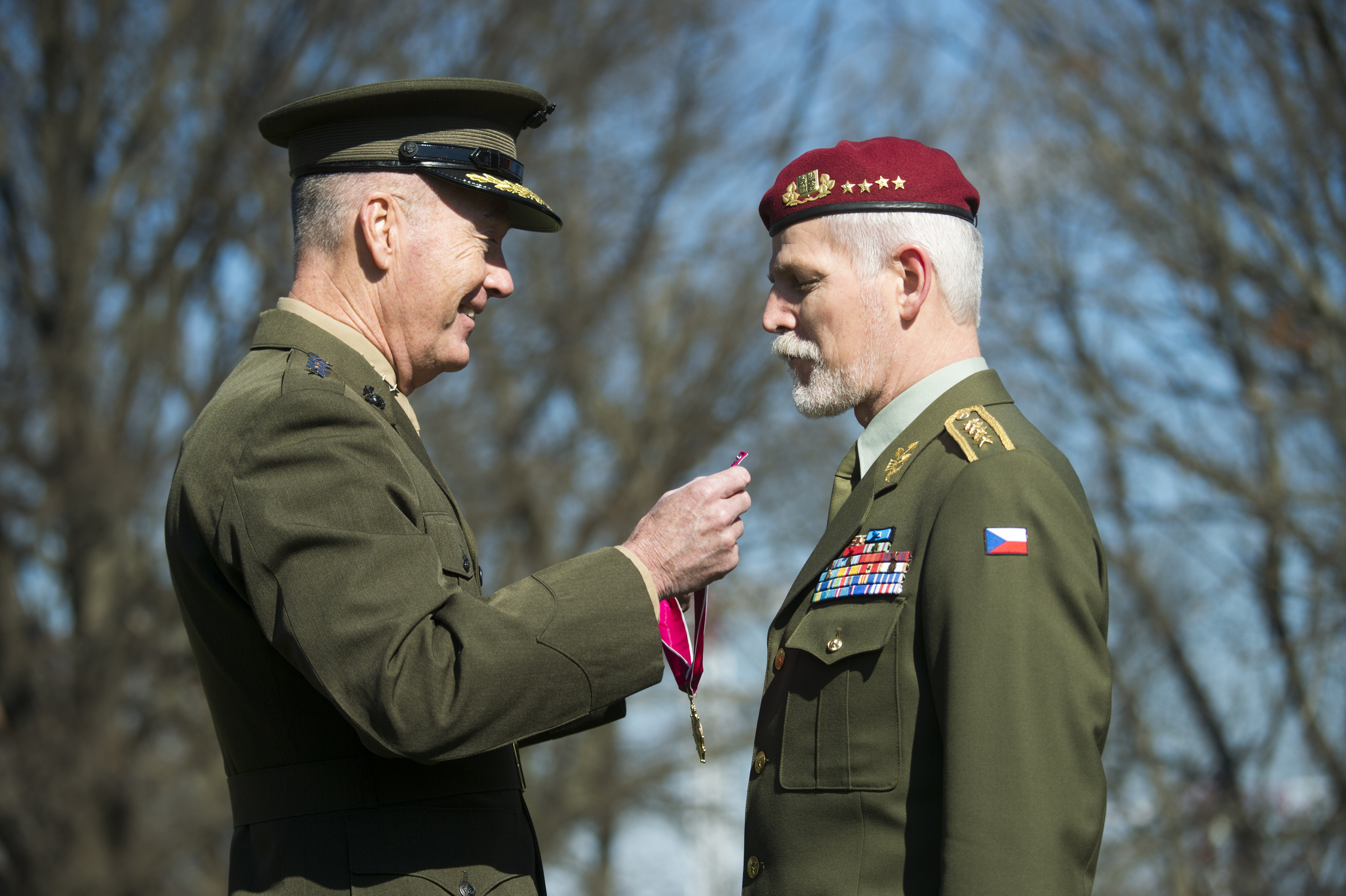
American General Joseph Dunford, Chairman of the Joint Chiefs of Staff, presents Pavel with the Legion of Merit in 2018.

- Czechoslovakia:
  - Medal for Service to the Fatherland (1988)
- Czech Republic:
  - Medal of Heroism (1995)
  - Medal ribbon For service in the Armed Forces of the Czech Republic
  - Medal of Armed Forces of the Czech Republic, 1st, 2nd & 3rd Class
  - Cross of Merit of the Minister of Defence of the Czech Republic, 2nd & 3rd Class
  - Medal of the Minister of Defence of the Czech Republic For service abroad, 3rd & 3rd Class
  - Honorary Commemorative Badge For the Service of Peace
  - State Defence Cross of the Minister of Defence of the Czech Republic (2018)
  - Order of the White Lion (ex officio, 2023)
  - Order of Tomáš Garrigue Masaryk (ex officio, 2023)

=== Foreign honours ===
- Belgium: Grand Cross of the Order of the Crown (2018)
- Bulgaria: Badge of Honour of the Ministry of Defence "Saint George", 1st Class (2017)
- France:
  - Cross for Military Valour with Bronze Star (1993)
  - Officer of the Legion of Honour (2012)
  - Commander of the National Order of Merit (2016)
- Latvia: Commander Grand Cross with Chain of the Order of the Three Stars (10 March 2026)
- Lithuania: Grand Cross with Golden Chain of the Order of Vytautas the Great (12 March 2026)
- Netherlands: Knight Grand Cross of the Order of the Netherlands Lion (4 June 2025)
- Slovakia: Member 1st Class of the Order of the White Double Cross (2024)
- Ukraine: Order of Prince Yaroslav the Wise, 1st Class (16 January 2026)
- United States: Commander of the Legion of Merit (2018)
- United Nations: United Nations 'In The Service Of Peace' Medal – UNPROFOR (1993)

== Notes ==
Military offices
Preceded by Vlastimil Picek	Chief of the General Staff; 2012–2015	Succeeded by Josef Bečvář
Preceded by Knud Bartels	Chairman of the NATO Military Committee; 2015–2018	Succeeded by Stuart Peach
Political offices
Preceded by Miloš Zeman	President of the Czech Republic; 2023–present	Incumbent
Academic offices
Preceded by Roberta Metsola	Invocation Speaker of the College of Europe; 2023	Succeeded by Ursula von der Leyen
