= Bečvář (surname) =

Bečvář (feminine: Bečvářová) is a Czech surname, meaning 'cooper'. Notable people with the surname include:

- Antonín Bečvář (1901–1965), Czech astronomer
- Josef Bečvář (born 1958), Czech army officer
- Miloš Bečvář (born 1957), Czech cross-country skier
- Roman Bečvář (handballer, born 1966), Czech handball player
- Roman Bečvář (handballer, born 1989), Czech handball player
- Václav Bečvář (born 1957), Czech sport shooter
- Václav Bečvář (weightlifter) (1908–1978), Czech weightlifter
