= Bečvář =

Bečvář may refer to:

- Bečvář (surname), Czech-language surname
- Antonín Bečvář (1901–1965), Czech astronomer
- Bečvář (crater), lunar crater
- 4567 Bečvář, minor planet
