= Opata =

Opata may refer to:

- Opata people, an ethnic group of Mexico
- Opata language, their language
- Aleš Opata, Czeck military officer
- Zoltán Opata, Hungarian football player and manager
