= Roman Bečvář =

Roman Bečvář may refer to:

- Roman Bečvář (handballer, born 1966), Czech former handball player
- Roman Bečvář (handballer, born 1989), Czech handball player
