= Jiří Šedivý (general) =

Jiří Šedivý (born 3 January 1953) is a Czech retired army general. He was the Chief of the General Staff of the Czech Army from 1 May 1998 to 30 November 2002.

== Early life and education ==
Šedivý was born in Příbram. He attended the military gymnasium in Moravská Třebová and graduated from the Military University of the Ground Forces in Vyškov in 1975. Šedivý later graduated from the Military Academy Brno. From 1993 to 1994 he attended the United States Army War College in Carlisle.

== Career ==
His initial assignment was to 57th Motor Rifle Regiment in Stříbro. He served as a company commander. In 1978 Šedivý commanded the 2nd Battalion, 18th Tank Regiment in Tábor. In 1982, he was assigned as the executive officer for the 18th Tank Regiment. In 1985, Šedivý served as commander of the 17th Tank Regiment in Týn nad Vltavou. Through the mid-1990s he commanded the 4th Rapid Deployment Brigade. In 1996 he represented the Czech Army in the Implementation Force (IFOR) and commanded Czech forces which formed part of IFOR. From 1 May 1998 to 30 November 2002, Šedivý was the Chief of the General Staff of the Czech Army.

Military offices
Preceded by Jiří Nekvasil	Chief of the General Staff; 1998–2002	Succeeded by Pavel Štefka
