= Pavel Štefka =

Czech army general

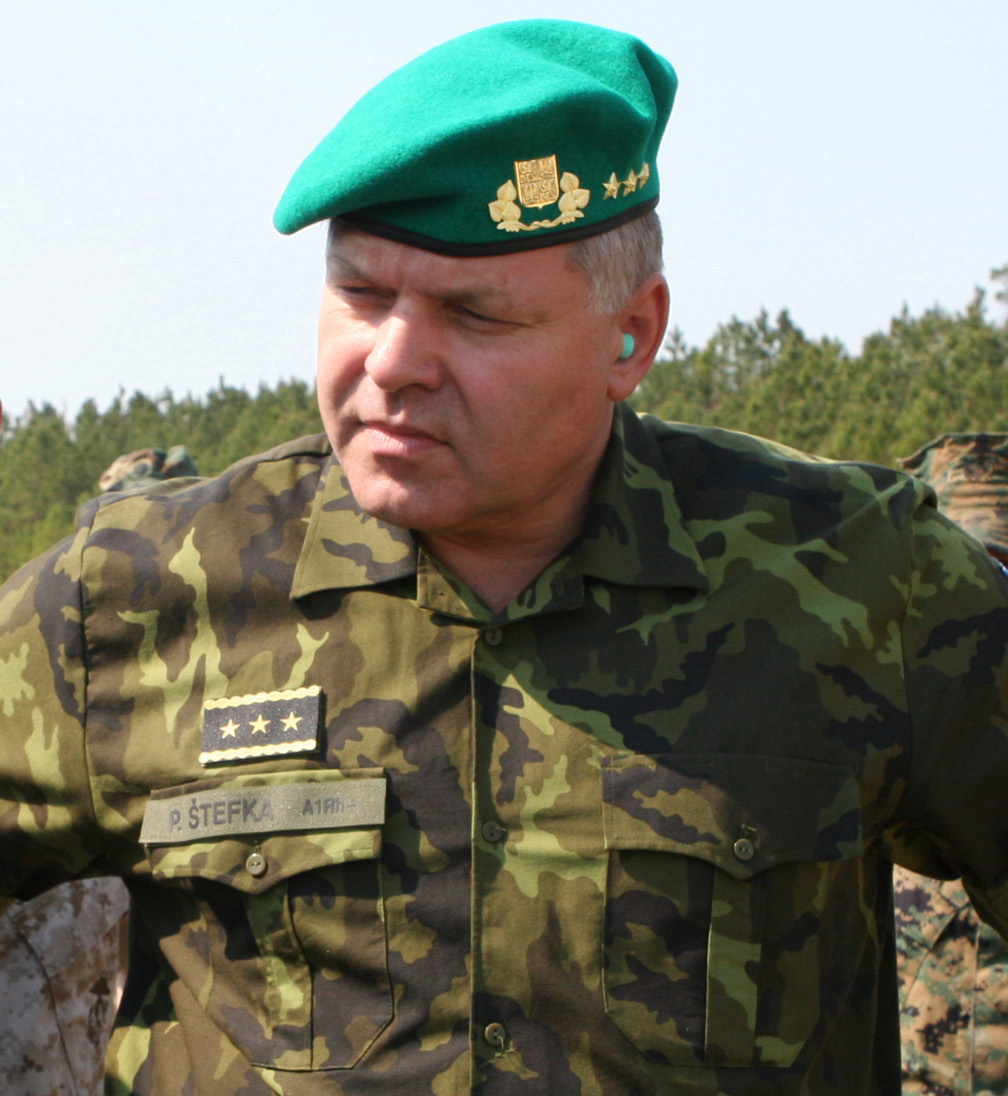

Pavel Štefka (born 15 September 1954) is a Czech retired army general who was the Chief of the General Staff of the Czech Armed Forces from 2002 to 2007.

== Early life and career ==
Štefka was born on 15 September 1954 in Ruda nad Moravou in Czechoslovakia. He attended the military gymnasium in Opava and graduated from the Military University of the Ground Forces in Vyškov in 1977. His initial assignment was to a Motor Rifle Regiment in Stříbro. On 1 December 2002, he was appointed Chief of the General Staff of the Army of the Czech Republic by presidential order with the rank of Major General, which is the highest position a soldier of the Czech Armed Forces can achieve. The day after that, he was awarded the rank of Lieutenant General, to which he was promoted five months later. On 8 May 2006, Václav Klaus appointed Štefka an General, the highest military rank in the Czech Armed Forces. He transferred command to Lieutenant General Vlastimil Picek on 1 March 2007. After leaving the army, he considered for the post of ambassador to Uzbekistan, but was never appointed due to scandals that during his time as head of the army.
