= Inauguration of Petr Pavel =

Presidential Inauguration of Petr Pavel
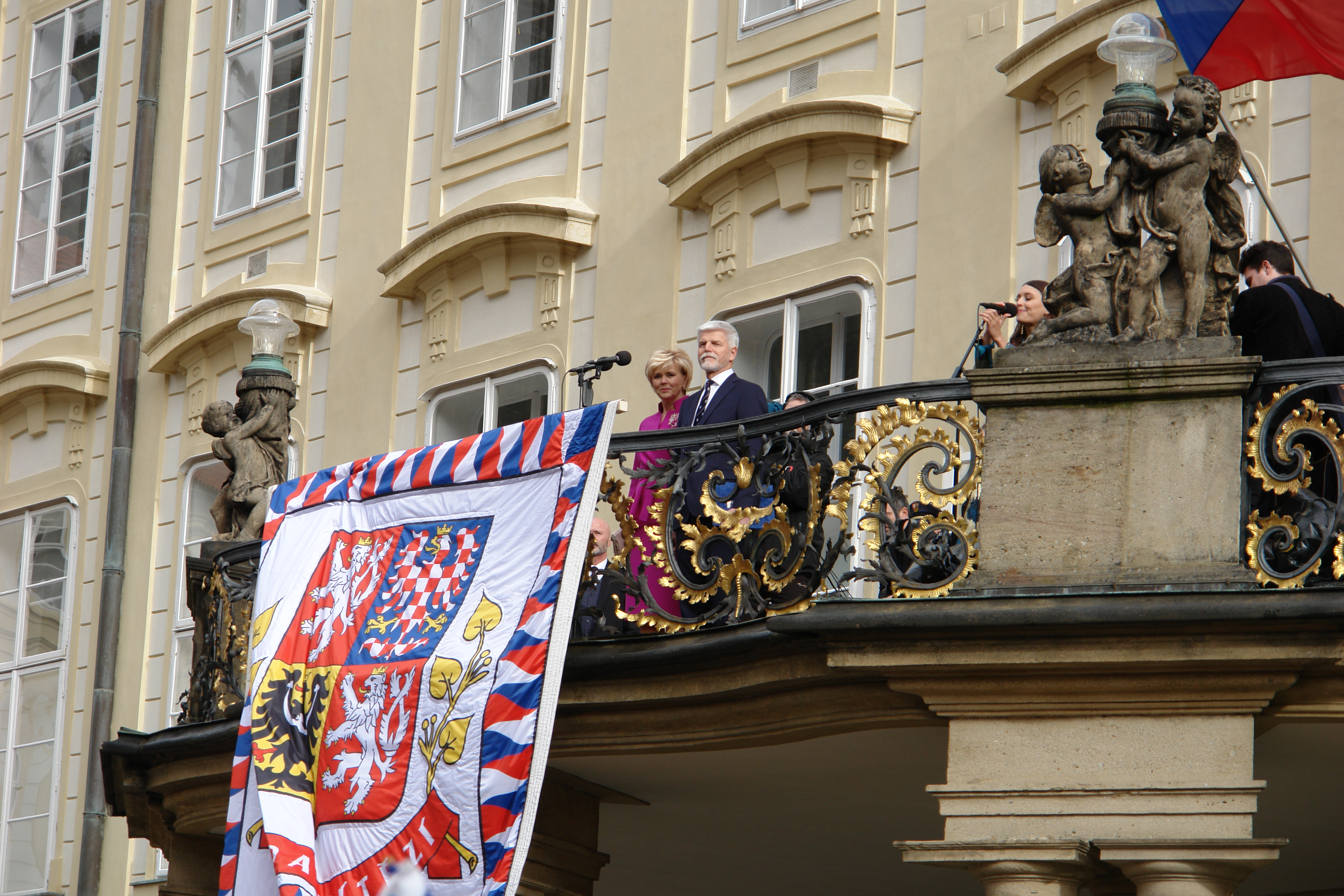
- Petr Pavel gives speech on the balcony of the third courtyard of the Prague Castle shortly after taking the oath of office.
- Date: March 9, 2023; 3 years ago
- Location: Prague Castle, Prague
- Participants: Petr Pavel; 4th president of the Czech Republic — Assuming office Miloš Vystrčil; President of the Czech Senate — Administering oath Petr Fiala; Prime Minister of the Czech Republic Markéta Pekarová Adamová; President of the Chamber of Deputies of the Czech Republic

The inauguration of Petr Pavel as President of the Czech Republic took place on 9 March 2023 at a ceremonial joint meeting of both chambers of the Parliament of the Czech Republic in the Vladislav Hall of Prague Castle. This is the seventh inauguration in the history of the independent Czech Republic.

== Previous election ==
The inauguration of Petr Pavel follows the 2023 Czech presidential election, in which Petr Pavel defeated Andrej Babiš gaining of 58.32% of votes in second round.

== Preparations ==
The preparation of the inauguration was ensured by the Office of the President of the Republic headed by Vratislav Mynář, the Office of the Chamber of Deputies headed by Martin Plíšek and the team of President-elect Petr Pavel led by the future head of the Office of the President of the Republic Jana Vohralíková.

The place of inauguration became the Vladislav Hall, in which all Czechoslovak and Czech inaugurations were held since 1934. Originally, the participation of foreign heads of state was intended, but in the end this idea was abandoned.

== Inauguration ==
The inauguration was attended by around 850 guests, mainly deputies and senators of the Parliament of the Czech Republic, members of the government of the Czech Republic, former presidents of the republic with their wives and Dagmar Havlová and the President of the Constitutional Court of the Czech Republic Pavel Rychetský. The inauguration was also attended by representatives of the judiciary, the academic community, the Army of the Czech Republic, security forces, diplomatic guests, the family of Petr Pavel and other guests invited by Petr Pavel.

== See also ==
- List of heads of the Czech state
