= List of international presidential trips made by Petr Pavel =

This is a list of international presidential trips made by Petr Pavel, the fourth President of the Czech Republic, since his inauguration on 9 March 2023.

== Countries ==
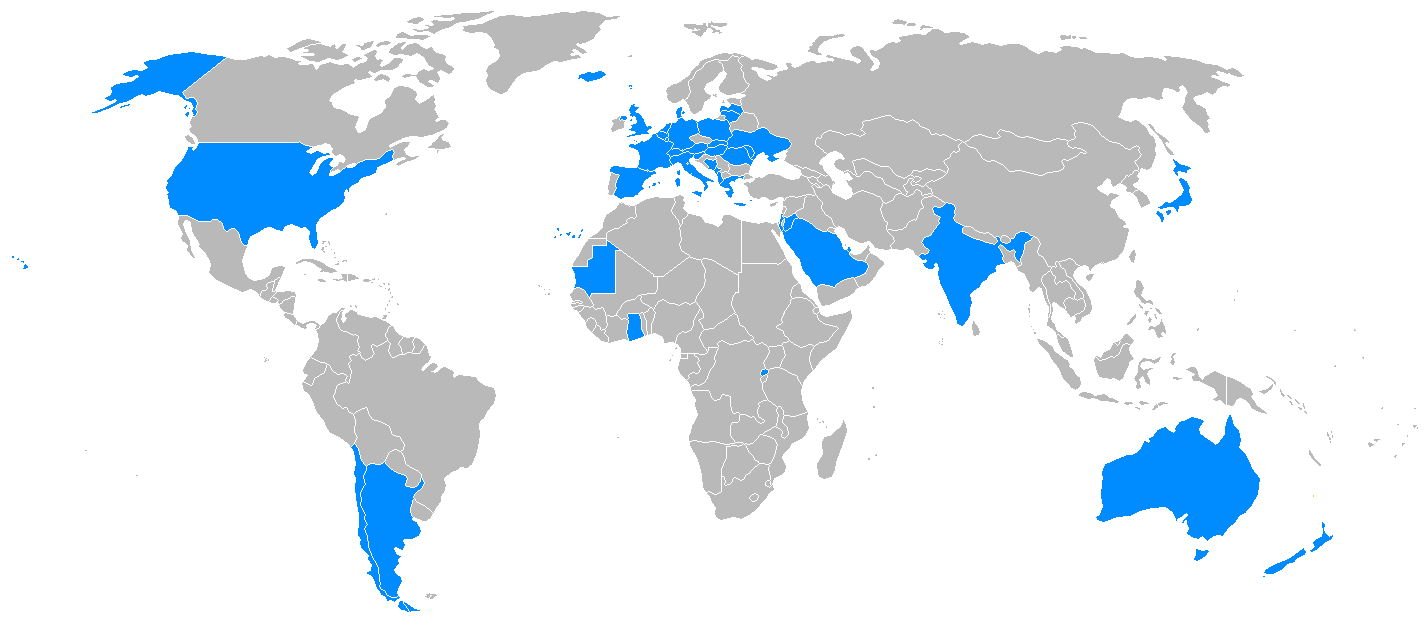

Since March 2023, he has visited these countries:

- One visit to Albania, Australia, Bosnia and Herzegovina, Croatia, Denmark, Estonia, Ghana, Greece, India, Israel, Japan, Jordan, Luxembourg, Mauritania, Moldova, Montenegro, New Zealand, Norway, Qatar, Rwanda, Saudi Arabia, Slovenia, Turkey, the United Kingdom and Vatican City
- Two visits to Hungary, Latvia, Romania, and Switzerland.
- Three visits to Austria, Belgium, Italy, Spain and Ukraine
- Four visits to Lithuania.
- Five visits to Poland, and the United States.
- Six visits to France and Slovakia.
- Eight visits to Germany.

== List ==
=== 2023 ===
| No. | Country | Venue | Date | Details |
|---|---|---|---|---|
| 1 | Slovakia | Bratislava | 13–14 March 2023 | Meeting with President Zuzana Čaputová, Prime Minister Eduard Heger and Speaker of National Council Boris Kollár. Visiting location of 2022 Bratislava shooting and honoration of Ján Kuciak. |
| 2 | Poland | Warsaw | 16–17 March 2023 | Meeting with President Andrzej Duda, and prime minister Mateusz Morawiecki. |
| 3 | Germany | Berlin | 21 March 2023 | Meeting with German President Frank-Walter Steinmeier and Chancellor Olaf Scholz. Visit of Gedenkstätte Berliner Mauer and Steinmeier's predecessor Joachim Gauck. |
| 4 | Belgium | Brussels | 19–20 April 2023 | Summit of NATO. |
| 5 | Ukraine | Kyiv; Dnipro | 28–30 April 2023 | Pavel visited Kyiv together with Slovak president Zuzana Čaputová. He then visited Dnipro becoming the first foreign head of state visiting Eastern Ukraine since Russian invasion of Ukraine. |
| 6 | United Kingdom | London | 5–6 May 2023 | Coronation of Charles III and Camilla. |
| 7 | Denmark | Copenhagen | 15–16 May 2023 | Attended Copenhagen Democracy Summit. Met Danish Prime Minister Mette Frederiksen, Queen Margrethe II of Denmark and former Secretary General of NATO Anders Fogh Rasmussen. |
| 8 | Iceland | Reykjavík | 16–17 May 2023 | Attended Council of Europe Summit. |
| 9 | Germany | Selb | 19 May 2023 | Attended start of Bavarian-Czech friendship weeks. |
| 10 | Austria | Vienna | 31 May – 1 June 2023 | Meeting with President Alexander Van der Bellen, Speaker of National Council Wolfgang Sobotka and Defense Minister Klaudia Tanner. |
| 11 | Slovakia | Bratislava | 6–7 June 2023 | Pavel attended Bucharest Nine meeting and then visited Czech soldiers who are part of Multinational Battle Group in Slovakia. |
| 12 | Lithuania | Vilnius | 11–12 July 2023 | 2023 Vilnius summit, NATO Public Forum |
| 13 | United States | New York City | 17–22 September 2023 | Session of the United Nations General Assembly, United Nations Security Council, bilateral meetings with other heads of state |
| 14 | Belgium; France | Bruges; Strasbourg | 3–4 October 2023 | Opening ceremony of the academic year at the College of Europe, plenary session of the European Parliament, meeting with the president of the European Parliament Roberta Metsola |
| 15 | Italy | Rome; Milan | 27–29 November 2023 | Working visit, meeting with President Sergio Mattarella and Prime Minister Giorgia Meloni |
| 16 | France | Paris | 20–21 December 2023 | Working visit, meeting with President Emmanuel Macron, Prime Minister Élisabeth Borne and President of the National Assembly Yaël Braun-Pivet |

=== 2024 ===
| No. | Country | Venue | Date | Details |
|---|---|---|---|---|
| 17 | Israel | Jerusalem; Beersheba | 15–16 January 2024 | Meeting with President Isaac Herzog, Prime Minister Benjamin Netanyahu and Speaker of the Knesset Amir Ohana, among others. |
| 18 | Qatar | Doha | 17 January 2024 | Meeting with emir Tamim bin Hamad Al Thani. |
| 19 | Spain | Madrid, Andalusia | 5–11 February 2024 | A private visit to Andalusia in southern Spain, which the president traveled on motorcycles, for example on a Honda Africa Twin off-road motorcycle. |
| 20 | Germany | Munich | 16–17 February 2024 | Attended Munich Security Conference, held bilateral talks with the President of Ukraine Volodymyr Zelenskyy, the President of Montenegro Jakov Milatović, the Swedish Minister of Defense, and the US Special Representative for Ukraine Reconstruction. |
| 21 | Luxembourg | Luxembourg | 28 February – 1 March 2024 | Meeting with Grand Duke Henri, Prime Minister Luc Frieden, Deputy Prime Minister Xavier Bettel and Speaker Claude Wiseler. |
| 22 | Germany | Dresden | 15 March 2024 | Meeting with Minister-President Michael Kretschmer. |
| 23 | Rwanda | Kigali | 5–7 April 2024 | Meeting with President Paul Kagame, attended the 30th commemoration of the Rwandan genocide. |
| 24 | Lithuania | Vilnius | 11 April 2024 | Three Seas Initiative summit, meeting with Ukrainian president Volodymyr Zelenskyy, and several bilateral meetings. The President is accompanied by a business and academic delegation under the auspices of the Confederation of Industry and Transport. |
| 25 | Jordan | Amman | 27–29 May 2024 | Meeting with Jordanian King Abdullah II, Crown Prince Hussein and other senior officials. The delegation brought with it a ton of powdered infant milk for distribution in the war-torn Gaza Strip. The President also visited two hospitals. Petr Pavle was accompanied by a business and academic delegation |
| 26 | France | Normandy | 11 June 2024 | Attended the ceremony marking the 80th anniversary of the Normandy landings. |
| 27 | Latvia | Riga | 11–12 June 2024 | Attended Bucharest Nine Summit. |
| 27 | Switzerland | Lucerne | 15–16 June 2024 | Attended Global Peace Summit. |
| 28 | United States | Washington, D.C., Houston | 9–11 July 2024 | Attended 2024 Washington NATO summit, meeting with selected congressmen, representatives of leading American think tanks, and participating as one of the keynote speakers at the NATO Public Forum. The President also visited the Johnson Space Center, met with Czech compatriots, and with representatives of the Texas and Nebraska National Guards. |
| 29 | Austria | Salzburg | 25–26 July | Opening ceremony of the Salzburg Festival and meeting with President Alexander Van der Bellen. |
| 30 | France | Paris | 28–29 July | Opening ceremony of the XXXIII Summer Olympic Games in Paris. Meeting with representatives of the Czech Paralympic Committee and with the President of France Emmanuel Macron. |
| 31 | Greece | Athens | 2–12 September | He began his private visits. |
| 31 | Albania | Tirana | 12–13 September | He then rode his motorbike with friends to Albania. |
| 32 | United States | New York City, Chicago, Cedar Rapids | 22–28 September | Working trip to the 78th session of the United Nations General Assembly in New York. Visit to the World Jewish Congress in New York. Visit to the University of Chicago and meeting with Illinois Governor JB Pritzker. Meeting with Iowa Governor Kim Reynolds and the opening ceremony of the renovated National Czech-Slovak Museum and Library together with Slovak President Peter Pellegrini in Cedar Rapids. |
| 33 | Switzerland | Bern | 5–7 November | State visit at the invitation of Swiss President Viola Amherd. |
| 34 | Australia | Sydney, Canberra, Adelaide | 24 November-1 December 2024 | State Visit Meeting with Anthony Albanese, official opening of the new Czech Embassy building in Canberra. |
| 34 | New Zealand | Auckland, Wellington | 1–5 December 2024 | Official visit to New Zealand. Meeting with Prime Minister Christopher Luxon, Minister of Defense Judith Collins and Governor-General Cindy Kiro. Meeting with compatriots. |
| 35 | Poland | Wisła | 16 December | President attended the meeting of the presidents of the Visegrád Group. |

=== 2025 ===
| No. | Country | Venue | Date | Details |
|---|---|---|---|---|
| 36 | Saudi Arabia | Bisha | 1–5 January | Private visit of Czech representatives to the Dakar Rally. Gala lunch with Saudi Prince Mohammed bin Salman. |
| 37 | Montenegro | Podgorica | 20–22 January | Meeting with Montenegrin President Jakov Milatović and Deputy Prime Minister Filip Ivanović, visit to the Faculty of Montenegrin Language and Literature in Cetinje and the Government Center for Cybersecurity. |
| 37 | Bosnia and Herzegovina | Sarajevo | 22–24 January | Meeting with the Bosnian Presidency and government delegation. |
| 38 | Poland | Oświęcim | 27 January | Participation in the commemoration ceremony of the 80th anniversary of the liberation of the Auschwitz concentration camp. |
| 39 | Spain | Málaga, Andalusia | 29 January – 6 February | A private visit to Andalusia, southern Spain, which the president traveled on motorcycles, such as a Honda Africa Twin off-road motorcycle. |
| 40 | France | Paris | 10–11 February | Attending the artificial intelligence summit of the international organization Project Syndicate at the Grand Palais. |
| 41 | Germany | Munich | 14–16 February | Attended 61st Munich Security Conference |
| 42 | Moldova | Chișinău | 20 March | Official visit at the invitation of President Maia Sandu. |
| 43 | Ukraine | Odesa, Kyiv, Moshchun | 20–21 March 2025 | Meetings with President Volodymyr Zelenskyy and Prime Minister Denys Shmyhal, honoring fallen Ukrainian soldiers. |
| 44 | Mauritania | Nouakchott | 6–8 April 2025 | Meeting with Mauritanian President Muhammad ould Ghazouani, Czech soldiers and representatives of the Office of the United Nations High Commissioner for Refugees, visit to the Mauritanian National Museum. |
| 44 | Ghana | Accra | 8–10 April 2025 | Meeting with Ghanaian President John Darmani Mahama, participation in the opening ceremony of the Czech House. |
| 45 | Poland | Warsaw | 28–29 April 2025 | Visit to the Three Seas Initiative summit, which unites thirteen Central and Eastern European countries. |
| 46 | Belgium | Brussels, Mons | 19–21 May 2025 | Visit to the European Union institutions based in Belgium. Meetings with the President of the European Council António Costa, the President of the European Parliament Roberta Metsola and the President of the European Commission Ursula von der Leyen. |
| 47 | Lithuania | Vilnius | 2 June 2025 | Attended Bucharest Nine Summit. |
| 48 | Netherlands | The Hague | 24–25 June 2025 | Attended 2025 The Hague summit. |
| 49 | Germany | Berlin | 9 July | Together with German President Steinmeier, the President attended the announcement of the winners of a competition for Czech and German students commemorating the 80th anniversary of the end of World War II. A memorial service at the Plötzensee Memorial and a discussion lunch, organized by the Körber Stiftung, together with NATO Secretary General Rutte. |
| 49 | Italy | Rome | 10 July | Speech at the International Conference for the Reconstruction of Ukraine. |
| 50 | Japan | Himeji, Hiroshima, Osaka, Tokyo | 22–26 July 2025 | Pavel arrived in Japan on the evening of July 22, and his program began the following day, July 23, in the city of Himeji, where a Memorandum on cooperation between Himeji Castle and Prague Castle was signed in his presence. Both landmarks are UNESCO World Heritage Sites and face similar challenges in the protection and management of cultural heritage. On the same day, the President travelled to Hiroshima, where he commemorated the 80th anniversary of the atomic bombing. He paid tribute to the victims by laying a wreath at the Peace Memorial. He visited the local museum, and signed the memorial book. His program in Hiroshima also included a visit to the interior of the Atomic Bomb Dome, which was designed by Czech architect Jan Letzel. The day concluded on Miyajima Island, where the President visited the Itsukushima Shrine, another prominent UNESCO site in Japan. On July 24, President Pavel, along with Her Imperial Highness Princess Takamado and other Japanese dignitaries, attended the National Day of the Czech Republic at the World Expo 2025 in Osaka. The festive day featured a rich cultural program, including performances by the Czech Philharmonic, the Children’s Choir of Czech Radio, the La Putyka circus ensemble, and singer Aiko as part of the project The Strings. On this occasion, the President also signed the Expo’s memorial book and took part in further programming at the Czech National Pavilion. On the following day, July 25, in Tokyo, the President opened the Czech-Japanese Business Resilience Forum, organized in cooperation with the Japan Chamber of Commerce and Industry, the Confederation of Industry of the Czech Republic, and the Japan Institute for Overseas Investment. |
| 51 | India | Dharamsala | 27 July | Private visit of the 14th Dalai Lama of Tibet, Tenzin Gyamtse. Visit of the exiled spiritual leader to Dharamsala in the Indian state of Himachal Pradesh at the invitation of the celebration of his 90th birthday. The President also met with representatives of the Tibetan government-in-exile, the Central Tibetan Administration, and its chairman, Penpa Tsering. The visit caused a diplomatic rift, after which China decided to end all diplomatic contacts with President Peter Pavel on August 12, 2025. |
| 52 | Slovenia | Ljubljana, Bled | 1–2 September | Visit to Jože Plečnik's house in Ljubljana. Participation in the Bled Strategic Forum, meetings with President Nataša Pirc Musar. Meetings with the foreign representative of the European Union Kaja Kallas. |
| 53 | Slovakia | Košice | 3 September | He began his private visit to Slovakia, Hungary and Romania in Košice. |
| 53 | Hungary | Săpânța | 3–6 September | |
| 53 | Romania | Alba Iulia | 6–15 September | He traveled to the Făgăraș Mountains with his friends on motorcycles, where he visited the Transfăgărășan mountain road on a BMW F 900 GS. |
| 54 | United States | New York City | 24 September 2025 | Attended the General debate of the eightieth session of the United Nations General Assembly. Met with President of Syria Ahmed al-Sharaa. |
| 55 | Slovakia | Bratislava | 1 October | Participation in the opening of an exhibition dedicated to the architect Jože Plečnik. |
| 56 | Hungary | Esztergom | 3 December | Participation in the summit of the presidents of the V4 countries. |

=== 2026 ===
| No. | Country | Venue | Date | Details |
|---|---|---|---|---|
| 57 | Ukraine | Lviv, Kyiv | 15–16 January 2026 | Meeting with President Volodymyr Zelenskyy, Prime Minister Yulia Svyrydenko and First Lady Olena Zelenska, honoring the memory of fallen Ukrainian soldiers, visiting a Lviv hospital, meeting with representatives of the Czech diaspora, entrepreneurs and representatives of the People in Need organization, receiving the Order of Prince Yaroslav the Wise. |
| 58 | Vatican City | Vatican City | 19 January 2026 | Meeting with Pope Leo XIV and Secretary of State Pietro Parolin. |
| 59 | Spain | Malaga, Andalusia | 27 January – 3 February | A private visit to Andalusia, southern Spain, which the president undertook after the publication of controversial reports from the Minister of Foreign Affairs, Petr Macinka. He completed the traditional trip with friends on motorcycles on the new BMW R 12 G/S enduro motorcycle. |
| 60 | Italy | Milan, Livigno | 6–8 February | Attending the opening ceremony of the 2026 Winter Olympics. |
| 61 | Germany | Munich | 13–14 February | Attended the 62nd Munich Security Conference. |
| 62 | Austria | Michaelerberg-Pruggern | 25 February – 1 March | Private visit to the Austrian Alps in the federal state of Styria. |
| 63 | Latvia | Riga | 9–11 March | Petr Pavel paid a state visit to Latvia, where he held talks with President Edgars Rinkēvičs focusing on bilateral relations, security and defence cooperation, and support for Ukraine. The visit also included meetings with Prime Minister Evika Siliņa and other senior officials, as well as participation in a Czech–Latvian business forum and commemorative events. The programme further included visits to cultural and historical sites and a trip to the Ādaži military base, where Pavel met Czech troops serving within NATO’s presence in the Baltic region. |
| 63 | Lithuania | Vilnius | 11–13 March | He paid a state visit to Lithuania, where he held talks with President Gitanas Nausėda and other senior officials, focusing on bilateral relations, security and defence cooperation within NATO, and support for Ukraine. The visit also included a joint business forum and the signing of cooperation agreements in areas such as defence, biotechnology, and research, as well as visits to border security facilities and a military base, where Pavel met Czech troops deployed in the Baltic region. |
| 64 | Croatia | Dubrovnik | 28–29 April 2026 | Attended the 11th Three Seas Initiative summit. |
| 65 | Slovakia | Bratislava | 12 May | Attended the Slavkov Format Summit. During their talks, the Presidents discussed current foreign policy issues, the region’s energy security and the use of artificial intelligence in education. |
| 65 | Romania | Bucharest | 13 May | Attended the Bucharest Nine summit. |
| 66 | Estonia | Tallinn, Narva, Sinimäed | 26–28 May | On the first day, Pavel and his wife, Eva Pavlová, began their state visit to Estonia with an official welcoming ceremony hosted by President Alar Karis and First Lady Sirje Karis. Pavel held talks with Karis on bilateral relations, European security, continued support for Ukraine, and strengthening NATO's eastern flank. The programme also included a meeting with the Speaker of the Riigikogu Lauri Hussar. On next day he and his wife met with Prime Minister Kristen Michal and discussed defence cooperation, transatlantic security, and the European security environment. They also attended the CyCon International Conference on Cyber Conflict, where Pavel delivered remarks alongside President Karis. The programme included briefings on Estonia's cybersecurity capabilities and discussions on digital innovation, resilience, and education. On last day, visited the Baltic Defence Line project and held discussions on regional security, resilience, and defence cooperation. The programme also included visits to educational and innovation institutions, where Czech–Estonian cooperation in education and digital technologies was discussed. Eva Pavlová participated in the official programme of the state visit. |
| 67 | France | Le Mans | 16–17 June | Private visit to the 24 Hours of Le Mans race, where the President, as an accredited photographer, took a collection of motor racing photos. Meeting with the President of the International Automobile Federation, Mohammed Ben Sulayem. |
| 68 | Poland | Jurata, Poznań | 27–29 June | On the 1st day, Petr Pavel, together with Estonian President Alar Karis, Latvian President Edgars Rinkēvičs, Lithuanian President Gitanas Nausėda, Slovak President Peter Pellegrini, and Romanian President Nicușor Dan, met with Polish President Karol Nawrocki in Jurata for an informal meeting, where the discussion focused on preparations for the NATO Ankara Summit, strengthening European defense capabilities, and continued support for Ukraine. On next day, they participated in a commemoration event in Poznań to mark the 70th anniversary of the protests. |
| 69 | Turkey | Ankara | 7–8 July | Attended the 2026 Ankara NATO summit. |
| 70 | Slovakia | Trenčín | 11 July | Visit to the Pohoda festival in Trenčín. Debate with former Slovak President Zuzana Čaputová. |
| 71 | Norway | Oslo | 9 September | Pavel travelled to Oslo at the invitation of King Haakon VIII of Norway to attend the funeral of King Harald V of Norway. |
| 72 | United States | New York City, Nebraska | 22–24 September | Pavel attended the 81th United Nations General Assembly. After that moving to Nebraska to conclude the local schedule finished the schedule. |
| 73 | Germany | Berlin | 21–22 October | Pavel paid a working visit, where he met with German Chancellor Friedrich Merz at the Federal Chancellery, where they discussed bilateral relations, mutual trade, transport links, European security and closer Czech-German cooperation in defence and security, including the supply of strategic raw materials and food. Pavel also participated in a roundtable organised by the German Council on Foreign Relations (DGAP). On next day, he took part in the Berlin Global Dialogue, speaking in a panel discussion entitled "A Continent on Guard: Redefining Europe's Security Reality", where he addressed Europe's preparedness for security challenges and the need for a coordinated response to hybrid threats. |

== Future trips ==
| Country | Location | Date | Details |
|---|---|---|---|
| Hungary | Budapest | 22-23 October | Pavel is expected to attend the 70th Anniversary Commemoration Ceremony Hungarian Revolution of 1956. |

== Multilateral meetings ==
Multilateral meetings of the following intergovernmental organizations took place during Petr Pavel's presidency (2023–Present).

| Group | Year | | | | |
| Group | 2023 | 2024 | 2025 | 2026 | 2027 |
|---|---|---|---|---|---|
| UNGA | 19 September, (United States) New York City | 22 September, (United States) New York City | 24 September, (United States) New York City | September, (United States) New York City | TBD, (United States) New York City |
| NATO | 11–12 July, (Lithuania) Vilnius | 9–11 July, (United States) Washington, D.C. | 24–25 June, (Netherlands) The Hague | 7–8 July, (Turkey) Ankara | TBD, (Albania) Tirana |
| Bucharest Nine | 6 June, (Slovakia) Bratislava | 11 June, (Latvia) Riga | 2 June, (Lithuania) Vilnius | 13 May, (Romania) Bucharest | TBA |
| Three Seas Initiative | 6–7 September, (Romania) Bucharest | 11 April, (Lithuania) Vilnius | 28–29 April, (Poland) Warsaw | 28–29 April, (Croatia) Dubrovnik | TBA |
| Others | Coronation of King Charles III and Queen Camilla; 5–6 May, (United Kingdom) London | Global Peace Summit; 15–16 June, (Switzerland) Lucerne | AI Action; 10–11 February, (France) Paris | | |
██ = Future event ██ = Did not attend / participate.
