= Evacuation of Karin Base =

Evacuation of French soldiers surrounded by Croat and Serbian units in 1993

- Part of United Nations Protection Force
Date	January 1993
Location	Karin near Benkovac, Croatia
Result	Successful evacuation of French peacekeepers from the base

Belligerents
(United Nations) UNPROFOR; Czech Republic; Slovakia; France	Croatia Republic of Serbian Krajina

Commanders and leaders
(Czech Republic) Petr Pavel (France) Eric Zanolini	(Croatia) Unknown Arkan

Strength
(Czech Republic) (Slovakia) 29–60 peacekeepers (France) 55 peacekeepers	(Croatia) Unknown Unknown

Casualties and losses
(United Nations) (France) 2 French peacekeepers killed	(Croatia) Unknown Unknown

The Evacuation of Karin Base occurred in January 1993 around Karin, Croatia. A unit of Czech and Slovak soldiers evacuated French soldiers of the UNPROFOR mission, who were surrounded by the Croatian and Serbian (Republic of Serbian Krajina) units during the Croatian War of Independence.

== Events ==
At the turn of 1992 and 1993, the French Karin military base found itself under mortar fire from the Croatian side of the front. Other French troops were unable to rescue the soldiers at the base because they were separated from the base by a destroyed bridge. There were 55 French soldiers trapped there at the time. The Czechoslovak battalion was at the time the only functional UNPROFOR unit in the area. 29 soldiers with 2 OT-64 transporters led by Lt. Col. Petr Pavel were sent to help the soldiers blocked in the Karin base. They were 30 kilometres from the base. The journey took two hours. Among other things, the Czechoslovaks were held back by trees that had fallen on the road. The soldiers had to clear them while under mortar fire.

As soon as the Czechoslovak transporters arrived at the threatened base, the French commander there began the evacuation to the transporters. 30 soldiers were located at the Karin base itself. By this time two Frenchmen were already dead and several wounded, one of whom had lost his foot. The base was bombed from both the Croatian and Serbian fronts. The unit had to get through the Serbian Arkan paramilitary units. Czechs and Slovaks also had to cross a minefield through which they were led to by Serbians. French soldiers were isolated at several locations near Karin. One group was surrounded by Serbian troops in Golesh. Once the unit reached them, Pavel had to negotiate with the Serbian commander to allow the Czech-Slovak unit to evacuate the Frenchmen. Croatian troops launched artillery fire when the Czech-Slovaks were allowed into Golesh, forcing Pavel to call the French liaison officer who was an observer of the Croatian staff, telling him that the Croatian artillerymen should stop. Croatian troops then stopped firing. Another group was trapped under artillery fire near Drače on a beach. Two French soldiers were killed there.

== Aftermath ==
The evacuation of the French soldiers was ultimately successful. For the entire event, the French Minister of Defense awarded four Czechoslovak soldiers with the French Cross for Military Valour – Lt. Col. Petr Pavel, Major Karel Klinovský, Major Stanislav Zaplatílek and psychologist Lieutenant Colonel Pavel Jirkovský. It is considered the biggest success of the Czechoslovak battalion during the UNPROFOR mission. Petr Pavel became famous thanks to the operation and eventually became Chairman of the NATO Military Committee. He was later elected as the fourth Czech president in the 2023 presidential elections.

== List of soldiers who participated in the operation ==
List of publicly known participants of the operation:

- (Czech Republic) Petr Pavel, commander
- (Czech Republic) Karel Klinovský, deputy commander
- (Czech Republic) Aleš Opata, future Chief of the General Staff
- (Czech Republic) Stanislav Zaplatílek
- (Czech Republic) Pavel Jirkovský, psychologist
- (Czech Republic) Ladislav Páteček, driver of OT-64 SKOT
- (Czech Republic) Pavel Vymetálek, driver of OT-64 SKOT
- (Czech Republic) Jaroslav Svoboda
