= Miroslav Hlaváč =

Czech lieutenant general

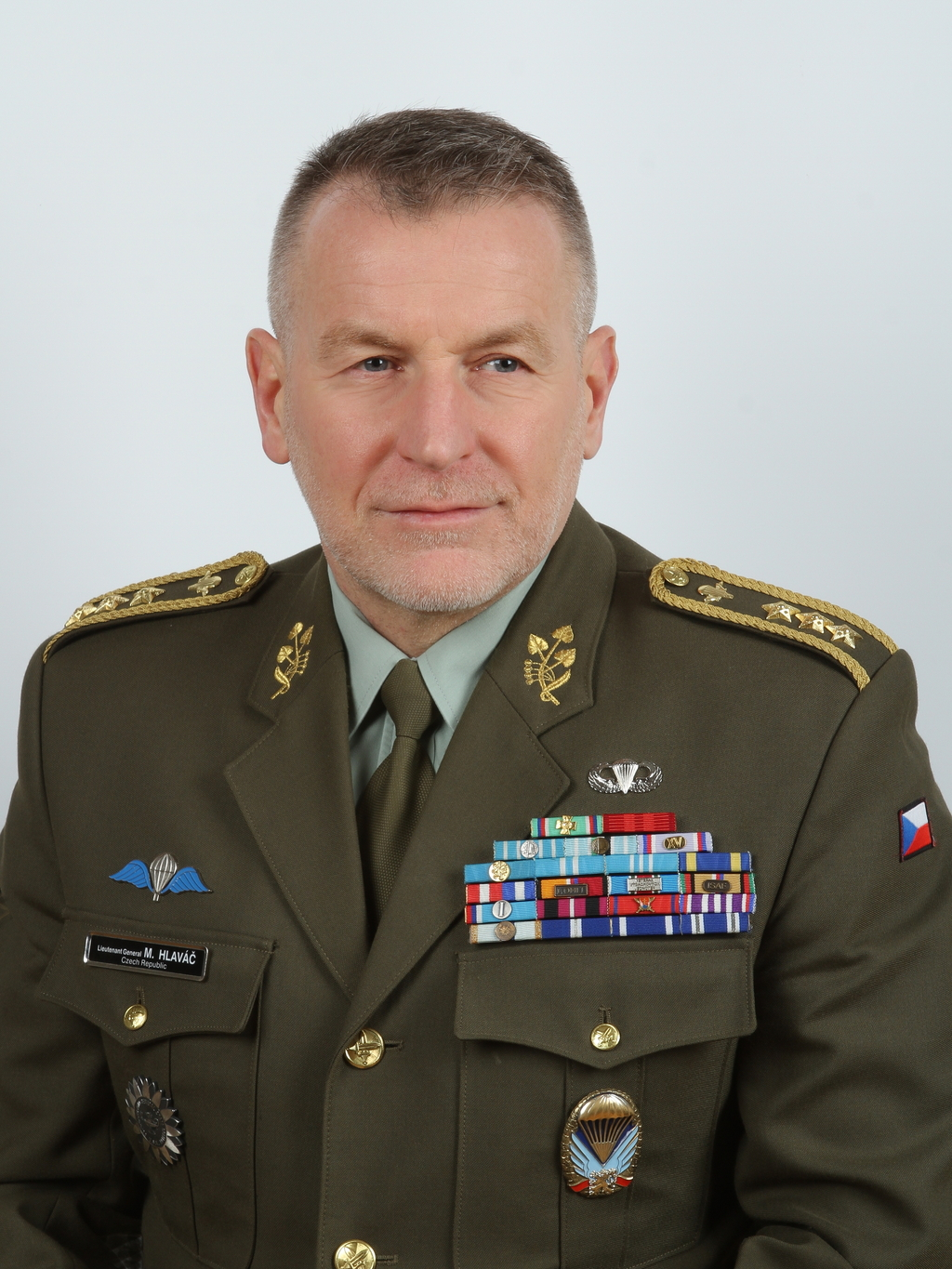
- Hlaváč in 2022

30th Chief of the General Staff
- Incumbent
- Assumed office 1 July 2026
- Preceded by: Karel Řehka

Personal details
- Born: 28 April 1965 (age 61) Stod, Czechoslovakia
- Party: KSČ (1986–1989)

Miroslav Hlaváč (born 28 April 1965 in Stod) is a Czech military leader. He is a Lieutenant General of the Czech Armed Forces who has since 1 July 2026 served as Chief of the General Staff of the Military of the Czech Republic. From 2023 to 2026, he was the First Deputy Chief of the General Staff of the Army of the Czech Republic.
