= Third courtyard of Prague Castle =

Courtyard at Prague Castle, Czechia

Coordinates: 50.0904°N 14.4006°E

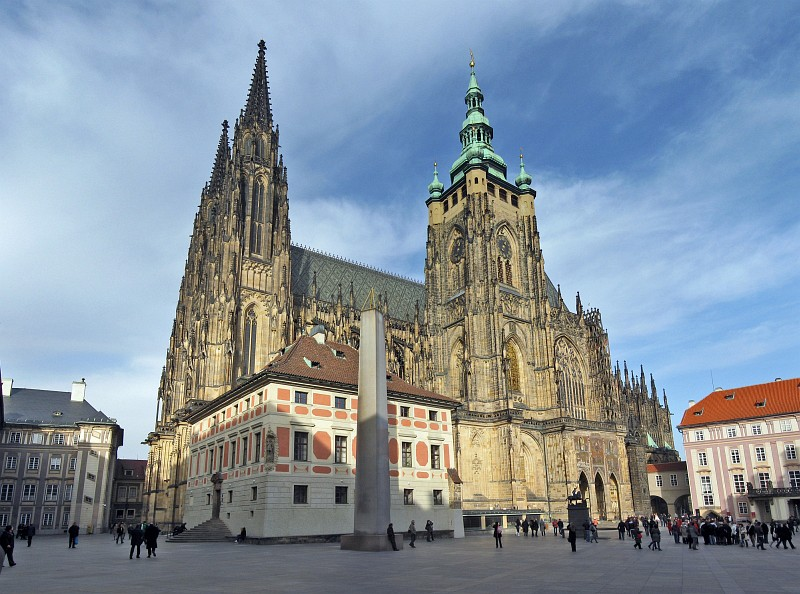
The courtyard in 2011

The third courtyard (Czech: Třetí nádvoří Pražského hradu) is one of four at Prague Castle, in Prague, Czech Republic. It features an obelisk and statue of Saint George.
