= Roman Bečvář (handballer, born 1966) =

Czech handball player

Roman Bečvář (born 2 July 1966 in Louny) is a Czech former handball player who competed in the 1992 Summer Olympics.
