= Josef Bečvář =

Czech general

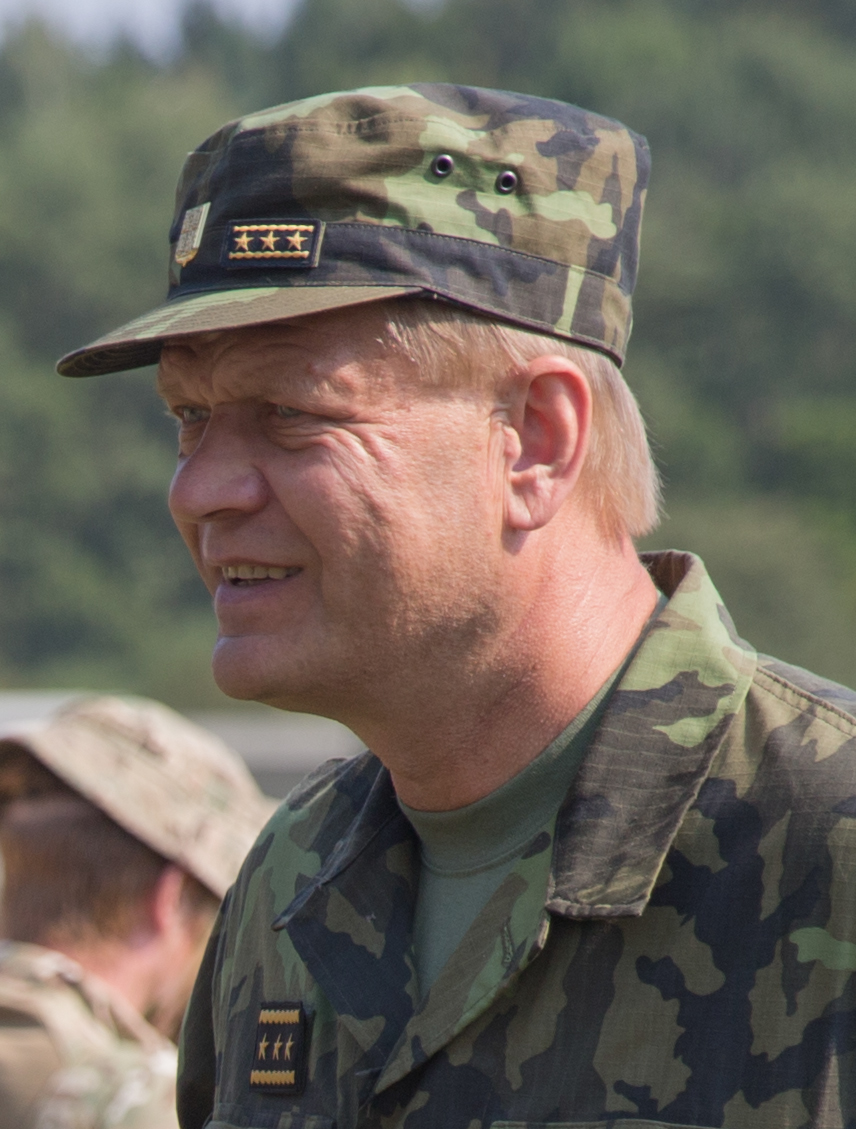
- Josef Bečvář during NATO exercise Allied Spirit II, 2015
- Born: 11 August 1958 (age 68); Plzeň, Czechoslovakia (now Czech Republic)
- Military career
- Allegiance: Czech Republic
- Branch: Czech Army
- Service years: 1981–2018
- Rank: General of the Army

General of the Army Josef Bečvář (born 11 August 1958) is a retired Czech army officer who served as the Chief of the General Staff of the Military of the Czech Republic from 2015 to 2018.
