= Aleš Opata =

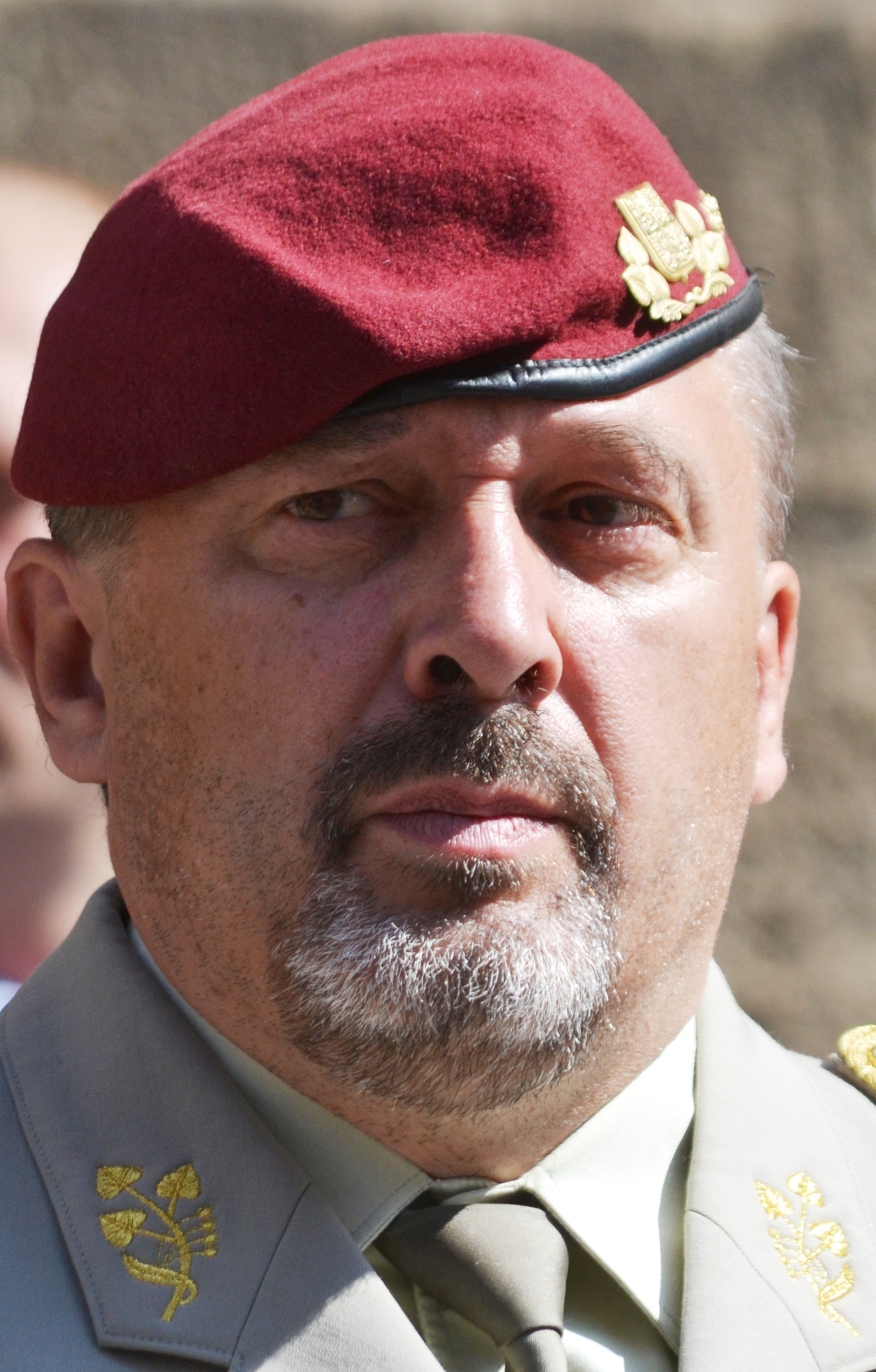
- Born: 9 September 1964 (age 62); Hranice, Czechoslovakia
- Military career
- Branch: Czech Army
- Rank: General

Signature
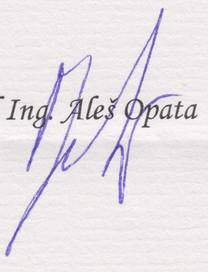

Aleš Opata (born 9 September 1964) is a Czech soldier who served from 2018 to 2022 as Chief of the General Staff of the Czech Army. In the years 2017 to 2018, he was the Deputy Chief of the General Staff.

== Biography ==
Between 1983 and 1987, he studied the field of theory of control and use of combat units at the Military University of the Ground Forces in Vyškov. He further completed his education between 1998 and 1999 at the Marine Corps University in Virginia, USA, and in 2004 at The Royal College of Defence Studies in London, United Kingdom.

Between 1987 and 1990, he worked at the 4th tank division in Jihlava, where he was a tank platoon commander up to tank battalion commander within the tank regiment units. In the years 1990 to 1992, he was the battalion commander of the reserve preparation group of the 13th tank material depot. He was deployed in Yugoslavia where he participated in Evacuation of Karin Base. Between 1994 and 1997, he held positions in the 4th Rapid Deployment Brigade in Havlíčkův Brod, where he successively performed the functions of officer of the mechanized troop training group, officer of the parachute and airborne training group and officer of airborne training.

In 1998, he became deputy commander of the 43rd Parachute Mechanized Battalion in Chrudim, which he commanded from 1999 to 2003. Between 2004 and 2008, he was the commander of the 4th Rapid Deployment Brigade in Žatec. In 2008, he became the deputy director of the section – the director of the operational department of the Section for the Development of Forces of the Ministry of Defense.

In the years 2009 to 2010 he worked as the director of the Section for the Development of Types of Forces – the Operations Section of the Ministry of Defense and in the years 2010 to 2014 as the Deputy Chief of the General Staff – the director of the Joint Operations Center of the Ministry of Defense. Between 2014 and 2017, he worked as the national military representative of the Czech Republic at the NATO SHAPE strategic command in Mons, Belgium.

In October 2023, he was appointed the ambassador of the Czech Republic to Lithuania.
