= Vlastimil Picek =

Czech politician

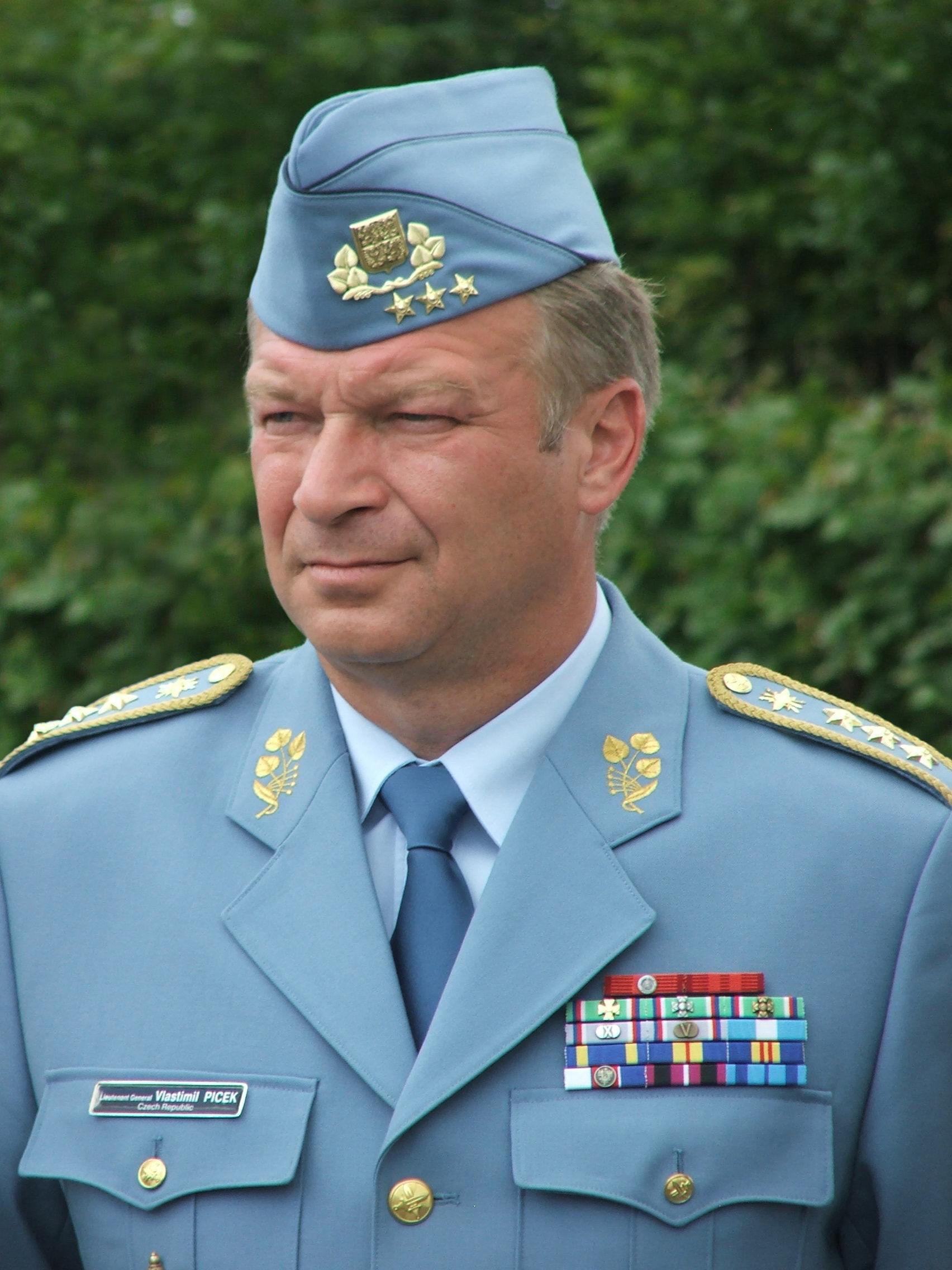
- Born: 25 October 1956 (age 69); Turnov, Czechoslovakia
- Allegiance: Czech Republic
- Service years: 1975–2012
- Rank: General
- Commands: Chief of the General Staff of the Armed Forces of the Czech Republic
- Awards: Cross of Merits of the Minister of Defence 3rd Grade ACR Medal 3rd Grade National Service Medal Medal for Merits in National Defence Honorary Commemorative Badge for Service in Peace Operation in the Balkans NATO 50th Anniversary Medal Honorary Commemorative ACR Badge of Premysl Otakar II, the Iron and Gold King

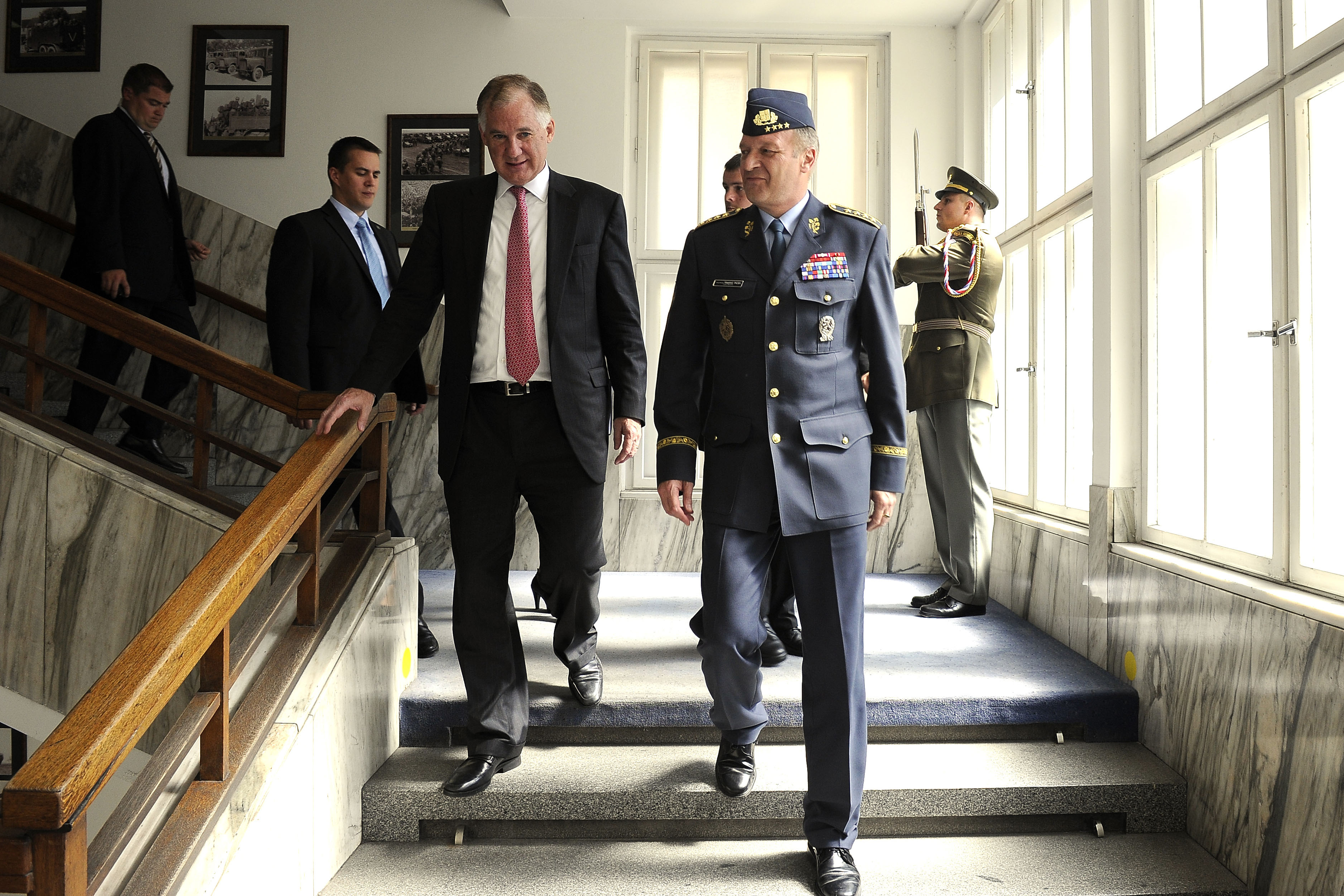
Vlastimil Picek and Deputy Secretary of Defense William J. Lynn III in Prague on June 15, 2011.

Vlastimil Picek (25 October 1956) is a Czech politician. He served as the Minister of Defence of the Czech Republic from March 2012 to January 2013. From 2007 to 2012, he was the Chief of the General Staff of the Armed Forces of the Czech Republic. He was the fourth person and the first member of Czech Air Force to serve at this position. He was appointed by President Václav Klaus and took office on 1 March 2007. He was replaced by Major General Petr Pavel as from 1 July 2012. On 18 September 2012 he was appointed the 1st Deputy Defence Minister. On 13 December 2012, he was dismissed by then new minister Karolína Peake and on 21 December 2012 reinstalled by Prime Minister Petr Nečas, after Nečas dismissed Peake. In March, 2013, he was appointed Minister of Defence.

== Personal background ==
Picek is divorced and has one son. He enjoys tennis and skiing. He was a member of Communist Party of Czechoslovakia until 1990.

== Education ==
He graduated from Military Technical Secondary School in Nové Mesto nad Váhom in 1975. From 1976 to 1981 he studied at Military Academy in Brno. While studying at Military Academy, he attended two special courses, Internal study and internal study of intelligence. In 1993, Picek finished his postgraduate degree from Czech Technical University in Prague and in 1997 he finished the follow-on academic course of the General Staff at the Military Academy in Brno.

== Career ==
- 1975 – 1978
  - Senior radio operator
- 1983 – 1986
  - Deputy Battalion Commander for Technical Issues
- 1986 – 1989
  - Senior officer at the National Air Defence HQ
- 1989 – 1993
  - Head of HQ Group for AF and NAD
- 1993 – 1994
  - Chief of Signal Branch 4th Air Defence Corps HQ
- 1994 – 1995
  - Section Chief of the Signal Branch at the General Staff of ACR
- 1995 – 1996
  - Deputy Chief of the Signal Branch at the General Staff of ACR
- 1996 – 1997
  - Chief of the Signal Branch at the General Staff of ACR (GS)
- 1997 – 2000
  - Chief of the Operational-Tactical C2 Systems Department, GS
- 2000 – 2001
  - Chief of the ACR Signal Branch – Chief of the Command and Control Division, GS
- 2001 – 2003
  - Chief of the ACR Control and Command Division, GS – MoD Security Director
- 1 May 2003 – 1 March 2007
  - Chief of the Military Office of the President of the Czech Republic
- 1 March 2007 – 30 June 2012
  - Chief of the General Staff of Armed Forces of the Czech Republic
- 18 September 2012 – 13 December 2012, 21 December 2012 – 19 March 2013
  - 1st Deputy Defence Minister
- 19 March 2013 – 29 January 2014
  - Minister of Defence of the Czech Republic
- since November 2014
  - mayor of Brandýs nad Labem-Stará Boleslav

== Dates of rank ==
- Brigadier General: 14 March 2001
- Major General: 8 May 2003
- Lieutenant General: 8 May 2006
- Army General: 28 October 2009

== Awards and decorations ==
- Cross of Merit of the Minister of Defence 2nd and 3rd Grade
- ACR Medal 3rd Grade
- National Service Medal
- Medal for Merits in National Defence
- Honorary Commemorative Badge for Service in Peace Operation in the Balkans
- NATO 50th Anniversary Medal
- Honorary Commemorative ACR Badge of Premysl Otakar II, the Iron and Gold King
- Knight Grand Cross of the Order of the Crown of Thailand (2011)
