= State visit =

Formal visit by a head of state to a foreign country

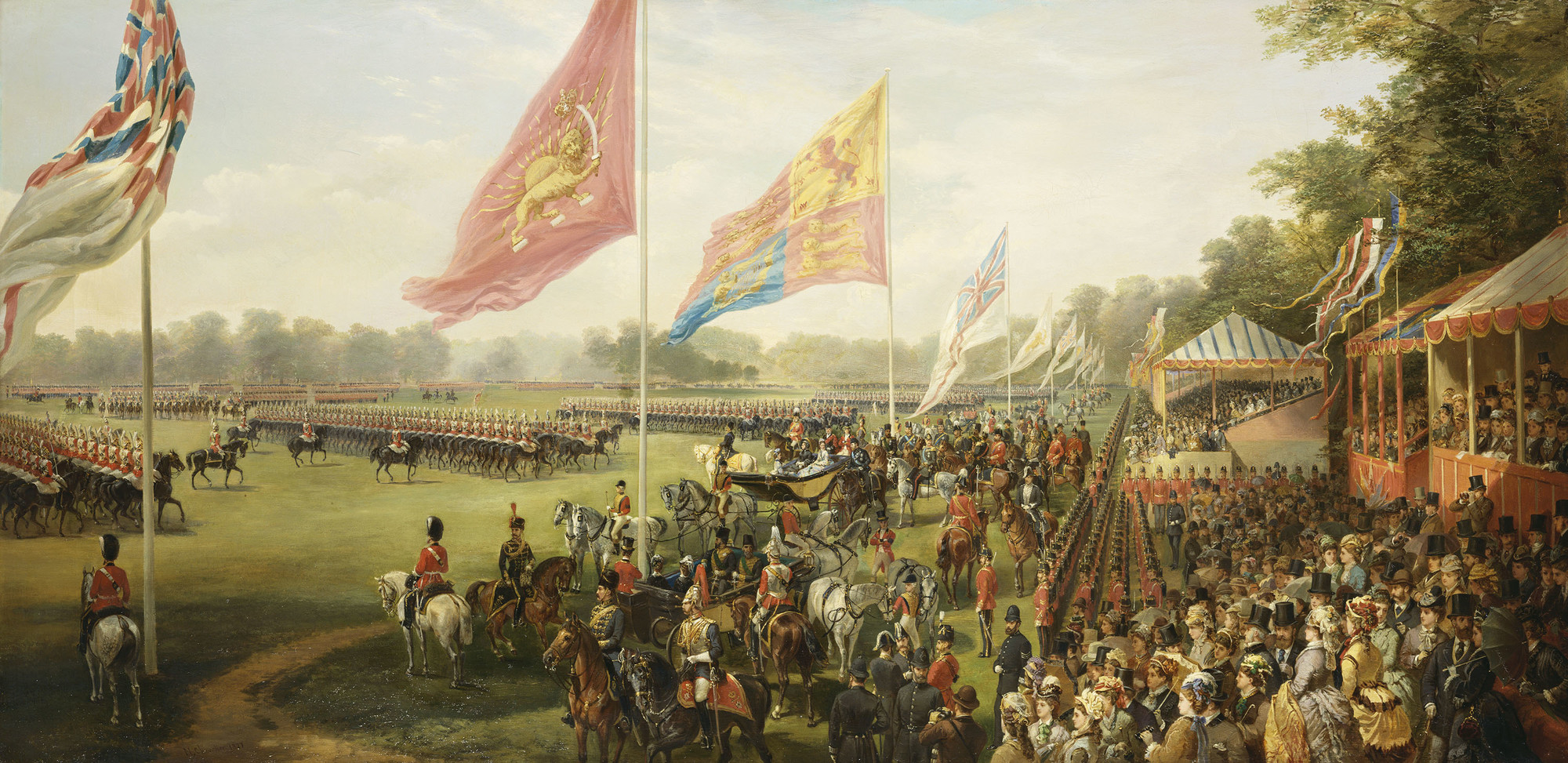
The Review in Windsor Great Park in Honour of the Shah of Persia, 24 June 1873 (Nicholas Chevalier, 1877). Naser al-Din Shah Qajar, the first Iranian monarch to make state visits to Europe, visited Queen Victoria twice.

A state visit is a formal visit by the head of a sovereign country (or representative of the head of a sovereign country) to another sovereign country, at the invitation of the head of state (or representative) of that foreign country, with the latter also acting as the official host for the duration of the state visit. Speaking for the host, it is generally called a state reception. State visits are considered to be the highest expression of friendly bilateral relations between two sovereign states, and are in general characterised by an emphasis on official public ceremonies.

A less formal visit, with less emphasis on ceremonial events, can be classified in descending order of formality as an official visit, an official working visit, a working visit, a guest-of-government visit, or a private visit.

In parliamentary democracies, while heads of state (or their representative) may formally issue and accept invitations, they do so on the advice of their heads of government, who usually decide on when the invitation is to be issued or accepted in advance.

Queen Elizabeth II was the most travelled head of state in world history, having made 261 official overseas visits and 96 state visits to 116 countries by the time of her Diamond Jubilee in 2012. Although she was sovereign of each of the Commonwealth realms, in practice, she usually performed full state visits as Queen of the United Kingdom, while the relevant governor-general undertook state visits for their respective country on the sovereign's behalf. However, the Queen occasionally made some state and official visits representing one of her other Commonwealth realms.

== Components of a state visit ==
State visits typically involve some or all the following components (each host country has its own traditions):

- The visiting head of state (or representative) is immediately greeted upon arrival by the host (or by a lesser official representative, if the two heads of state are to meet later at another location) and by their ambassador (or other head of mission) accredited to the host country.
- A 21-gun salute is fired in honor of the visiting head of state.
- The playing of the two national anthems by a military band. The guest country's anthem is usually played first.
- A review of a military guard of honour.
- The visiting head of state (or representative) is formally introduced to senior officials/representatives of the host country and the hosting head of state is introduced to the delegation accompanying the visiting head of state.
- An exchange of gifts between the two heads of state (or representatives).
- A state dinner, either white tie or black tie, is celebrated by the hosting head of state (or representative), with the visiting head of state being the guest of honour.
- A visit to the legislature of the host country, often with the visiting head of state (or representative) being invited to deliver a formal address to the assembled members of the legislature.
- High-profile visits by the visiting heads of state (or representative) to host country landmarks such as laying a wreath at a military shrine or cemetery.
- The staging of cultural events celebrating links between the two nations.

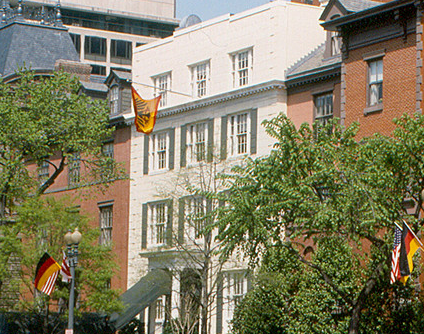
The German presidential standard displayed at Blair House, the American presidential guest house in Washington, D.C., during the visit of Richard von Weizsäcker, President of Germany. Several countries maintain guest houses used for state visits.

The visiting head of state (or their representative) is usually accompanied by a senior government minister, usually by a foreign minister. Behind the diplomatic protocol, delegations made up from trade organizations also accompany the visiting head of state, offer an opportunity to network and develop economic, cultural, and social links with industry leaders in the nation being visited. At the end of a state visit, the foreign head of state (or representative) traditionally issues a formal invitation to the head of state (or representative) of the nation being visited who at another time in the future, would pay a reciprocal state visit.

While the costs of a state visit are usually borne by state funds of the host country, most nations host fewer than ten state visits per year, with some as few as two. Most foreign heads of state (or their representative) will stay in the official residence of the head of state (or representative) who is hosting the state visit, in a guest house reserved for foreign visitors, or in their own nation's embassy located in the foreign nation being visited.

State visits by well-known global leaders or figures, such as the British monarch, the president of the United States or the pope, often draw much publicity and large crowds. Occasionally, these include protesters.

== State visits by country ==
=== Armenia ===
State visits to Armenia are held in the capital of Yerevan, with a welcoming ceremony usually being held at Zvartnots International Airport. Foreign heads of state are welcomed at the President's Residence while heads of government are welcomed at the Residence of the Prime Minister. These visits consist of the following components:

| | Rank of visitor | State dinner | Arrival ceremonies | | | Exchange of diplomatic gifts | Meeting with religious leaders | Address to the National Assembly |
| | Rank of visitor | State dinner | Prime Minister's Residence | President's Residence | Airport | Exchange of diplomatic gifts | Meeting with religious leaders | Address to the National Assembly |
|---|---|---|---|---|---|---|---|---|
| State visit | head of state | Yes | No | Yes | Maybe | Yes | Yes | Maybe |
| Official visit | head of government | Yes | Yes | No | Maybe | Maybe | Maybe | Maybe |

Since 1991, foreign leaders who embark on visits to Armenia have paid tribute to the victims of the Armenian genocide at the Tsitsernakaberd complex. During a visit to the complex, most leaders receive a tour of the museum, plant trees near the memorial, and lay wreaths at the eternal flame.

=== Belgium ===
A state visit in Belgium starts with an inspection of the troops in front of the Royal Palace of Brussels, whereafter the King and Queen have a private audience with the visiting head of state and their spouse. The first day of the state visit traditionally comes to a close with a state banquet at the Royal Palace of Laeken, which is the official residence of the King and Queen of the Belgians.

It is customary to be awarded the Knight Grand Cross of the Order of Leopold during state visits.

=== Canada ===
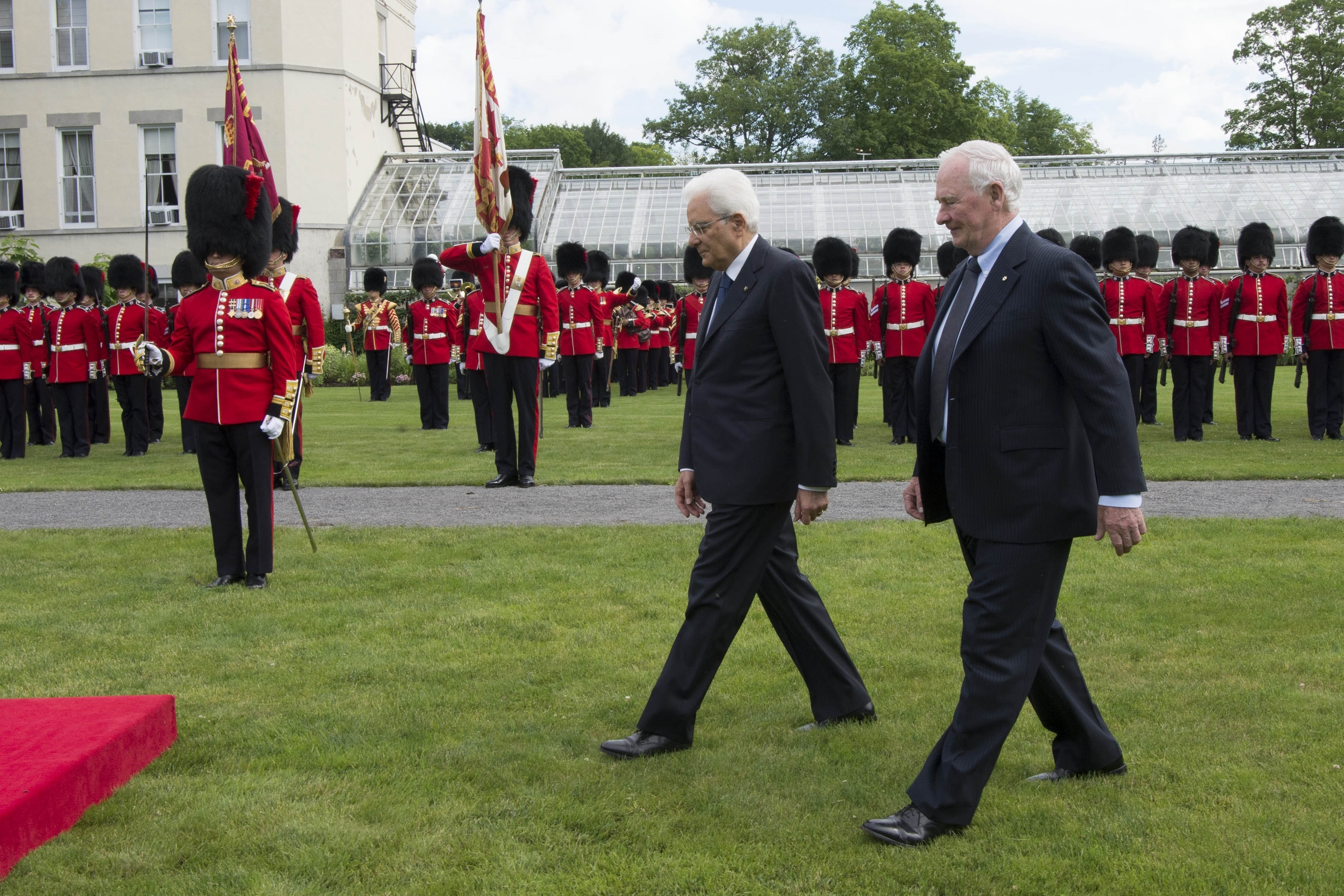
The Governor General's Foot Guards mounting the guard of honour during state visits of Italian President Sergio Mattarella

The Office of Protocol coordinates the operational aspects of state and official visits to Canada and manages all events that are related to the visit. It also defines the protocol standards for state visits of heads of state and government.

The Governor General's Foot Guards, one of two household foot guards, take part in state and official visits to Ottawa. Arrival ceremonies take place at either Parliament Hill or Rideau Hall, where the visitor will be received by the governor general of Canada (for state visits) or prime minister of Canada (for official visits). State visits also include a visit to the National War Memorial.

State and official visits by Canada are performed by the Canadian monarch or a representative—the governor general, a lieutenant governor, or another member of the royal family. The first state visit by Canada was to the United States in 1937, when the US accorded the governor general the equivalent status given to a visiting head of state.

Tours of Canada by the country's monarch (and other members of the royal family) are not state or official visits, as the monarch conducts royal tours in his capacity as the Canadian head of state, not as a foreign head of state. Additionally, because the Canadian sovereign is shared with 14 other Commonwealth realms, state visits are not conducted between realms, with official visits performed by the realms' respective governor-general, or prime minister.

=== China ===
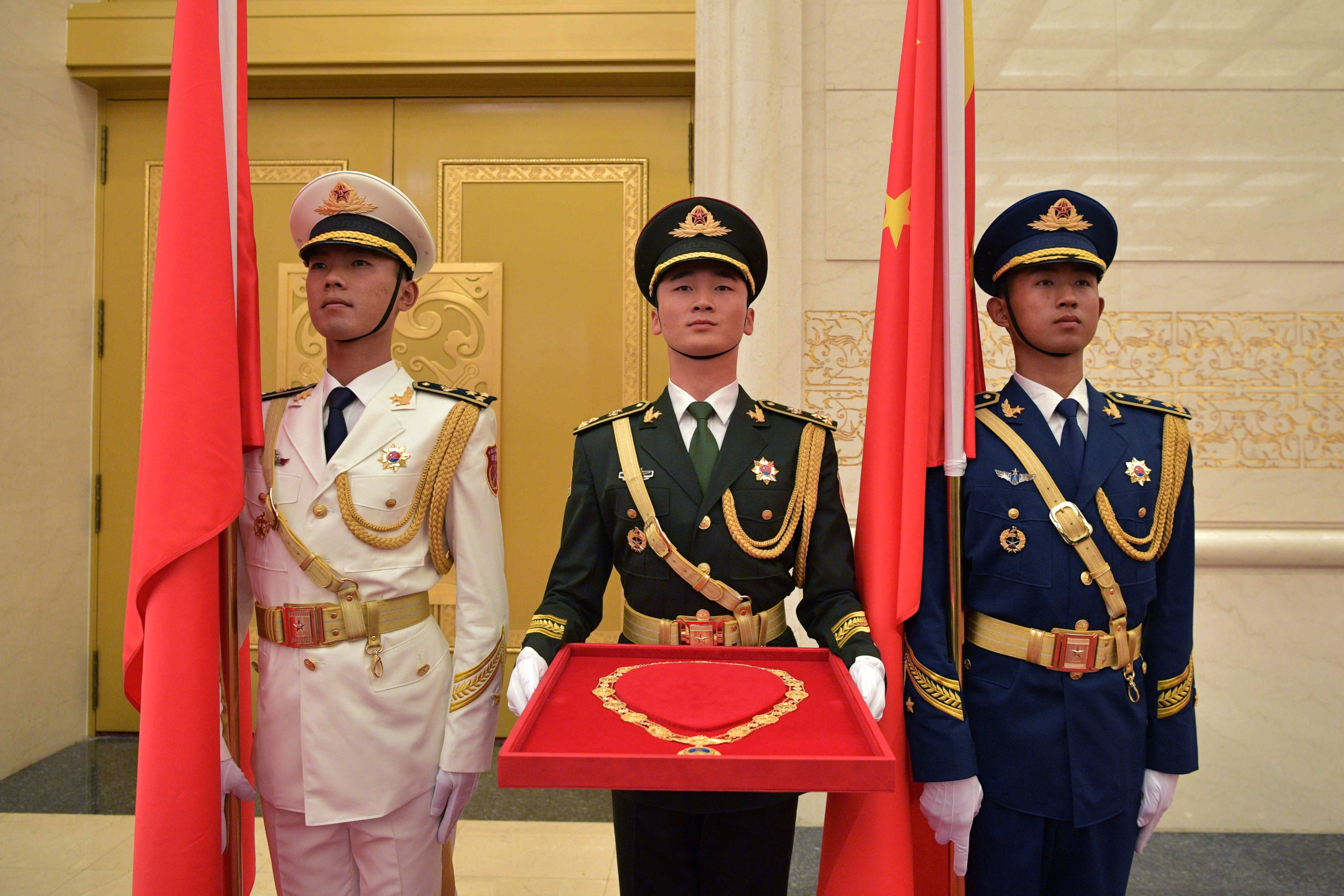
The Beijing Garrison Honor Guard with the Order of Friendship, an award occasionally given during state visits

State arrival ceremonies in China take place at the East Court of the Great Hall of the People on Tiananmen Square in Beijing. The guard of honour for the ceremony is provided by the Beijing Garrison Honor Guard, with musical accompaniment provided by the Central Military Band of the People's Liberation Army of China.

As the military band plays the national anthems of the two countries, an artillery battery fires a 21-gun salute. After the band finishes its performance, the two leaders then inspect the guard of honour at the invitation of the guard commander. Following the inspection, both leaders embrace schoolchildren who wave flowers and the flags of both countries. At this time, the band performs a military march or folk song from the guest country. If a prime minister or chancellor or crown prince visits China, the welcoming ceremony is held by the premier. If a president, governor-general or king visits, the welcoming ceremony is held by the president.

The People's Liberation Army (PLA) Honor Guard then marches off the square to the tune of the March of the Chinese People's Liberation Army. The ceremony ends with the marching band of the PLA performing an exhibition of military drill.

During state visits, national awards are presented to visiting dignitaries, including the Order of Friendship. Since 1954, the State Protection Unit has provided motorcades for visiting dignitaries traveling from the airport to their meeting place.

=== Republic of China (Taiwan) ===
A 30-minute ceremony at the Plaza of the National Theater and Concert Hall in Taipei takes place to honor visiting dignitaries to the Republic of China (Taiwan). After the anthems are played, the president escorts the visitor past the tri-service honor guard of the Republic of China Armed Forces, led by a colonel. After inspecting the troops, the president of Taiwan delivers welcome remarks, after which the foreign leader speaks, before receiving a key to the city from the mayor of Taipei, and the director of the Department of Protocol of the Ministry of Foreign Affairs then introducing members of the cabinet to the dignitary and members of the delegation to the ROC president.

=== Czech Republic ===
The military welcome accorded to foreign leaders at Prague Castle are provided by troops of the Prague Castle Guard, Honor Guard of the Czech Armed Forces, the Czech Army Central Band, the Band of the Castle Guards and Police and units of the Prague Garrison Command.

=== Finland ===
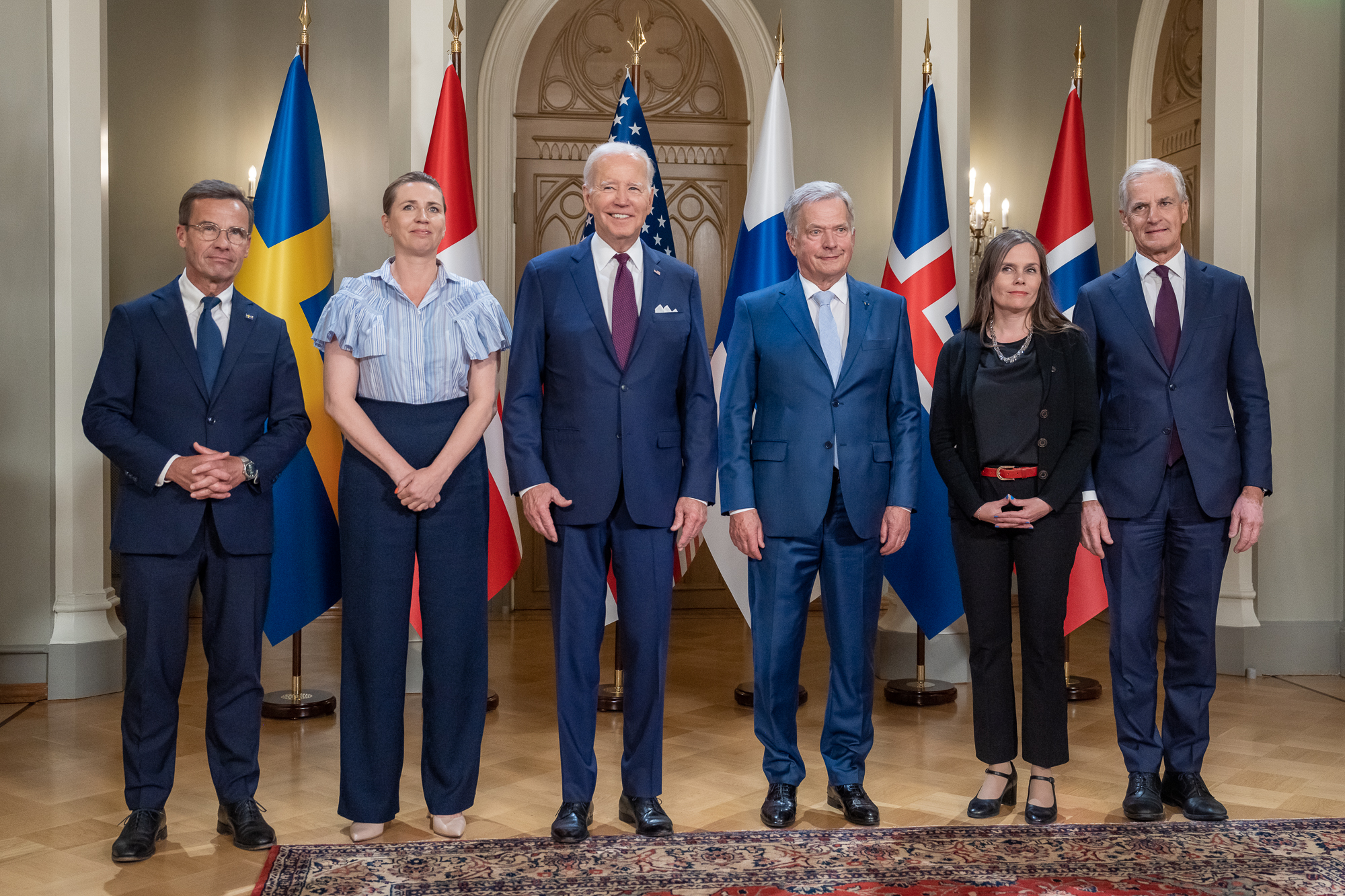
US President Joe Biden meeting the leaders of the Nordic countries in Helsinki, in July 2023

The Protocol Services of the Ministry of Foreign Affairs is responsible for arranging high-level international visits and Finland's own state events. The task of the protocol services is to take care of receiving, escorting, accommodation, transportation and meal arrangements for guests.

In Finland, state visits usually follow a certain pattern that has already become a tradition. The official reception ceremonies take place in front of the Presidential Palace or alternatively at Helsinki Airport. At the reception ceremony, the head of the visiting country, together with the President of Finland, inspects the guard of honor to the rhythm of the Björneborgarnas marsch. After the inspection of the honor guard and the performance of the national anthems, the heads of state greet the public from the balcony of the Presidential Palace, from where they move to the yellow salon to drink welcome toasts, take official photos and exchange gifts and badges of honor.

Usually, the official program includes at least the laying a wreath on Marshal Mannerheim's grave at the Hietaniemi Cemetery, and a visit to the Parliament House or the Helsinki City Hall. The visit usually ends with state dinners held at the Presidential Palace, where the heads of state give their speeches.

=== France ===
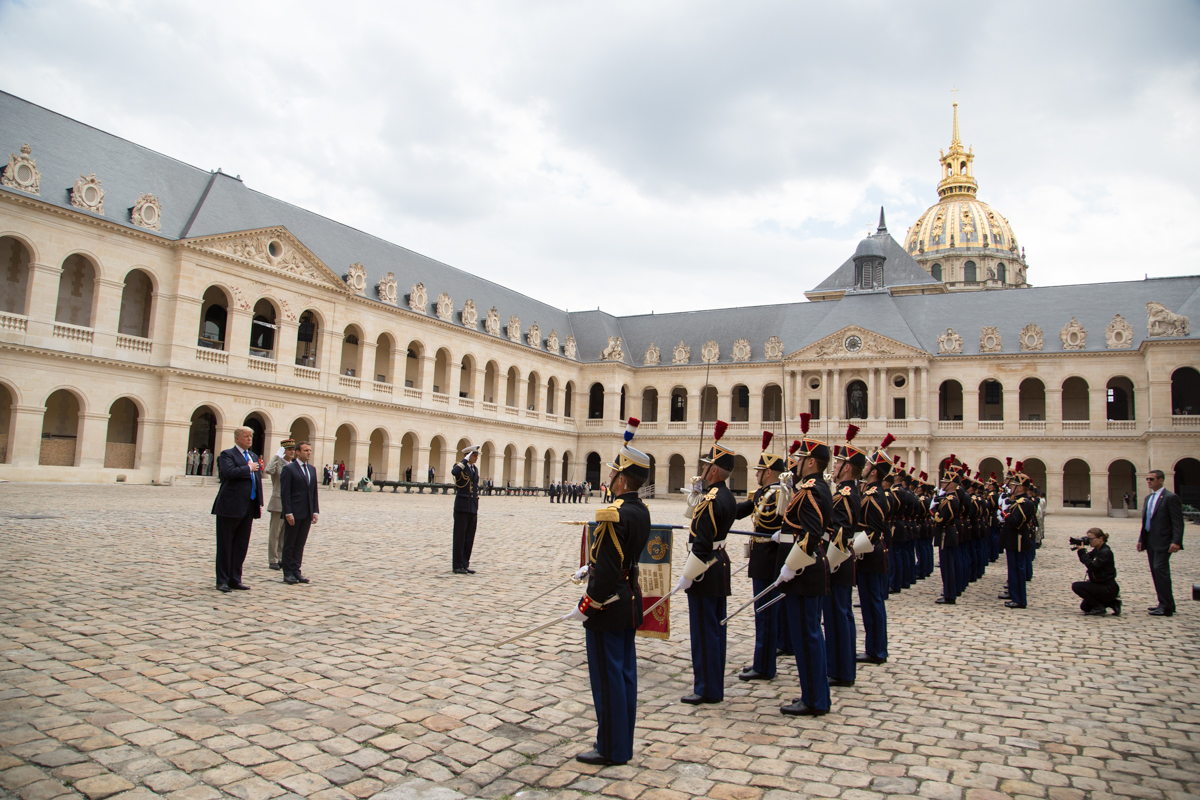
Donald Trump at Les Invalides during his state visit to France, 13 July 2017. Arrival ceremonies typically take place at Les Invalides, or the Elysee Palace.

State arrival ceremonies are held at either the Elysee Palace or Les Invalides, with the participation of the Infantry and Fanfare Band of the French Republican Guard Band and the 1st Infantry Regiment of the Republican Guard. The Vestibule d'Honneur (Hall of Honour) in the Elysee is where the president of France meets visiting dignitaries and holds bilateral meetings. Towards the end of the visit, the head of state or governments will give a speech at the Palais Bourbon to the Senate of France, and will hold meetings with members of parliament. Sometime during the state visit, the visiting dignitary will lay a wreath at the Tomb of the Unknown Soldier at the Arc de Triomphe.

=== Georgia ===
State visits in Georgia are held outside the Presidential Palace of Georgia in Tbilisi. Ceremonial honours are provided by the Honour Guard and the Band of the National Guard of Georgia. The band plays Georgian Army songs during the inspection of the honour guard. During the presidency of Mikheil Saakashvili, the band played the March of the Preobrazhensky Regiment during state visits.

During state visits, dignitaries usually meet with the prime minister, chairperson of the Parliament, and the Catholicos-Patriarch of All Georgia separately from the president. State dinners are also held inside the presidential palace with officials from both countries present.

=== Germany ===
During state visits to Germany, honours are provided by the German Wachbataillon (Guard battalion) and the Staff Band of the Bundeswehr. An exception to this was on 3 May 2007 during the visit of French President Jacques Chirac to Berlin, during which the Franco-German Brigade provided the honors. Depending on the status of the guest, state ceremonies are either held at the Bellevue Palace or the Federal Chancellery Complex. In recent years, state visits have been marked with dignitaries paying homage at memorials such as the Berlin Victory Column, the Memorial to the Murdered Jews of Europe, and the Soviet War Memorial (Tiergarten).

During state visits, foreign dignitaries typically visit German federal states outside the capital. It this regard, a full honors ceremony is also held with the minister-president being the presiding officer. In break with the traditional Berlin military protocol, chairs have since July 2019 been set up outside the Chancellery due to Chancellor Angela Merkel's unusual episodes of shaking and uneasiness during the honours ceremony. Currently, only Moldovan Premier Maia Sandu and Danish Prime Minister Mette Frederiksen have had to be received under this arrangement.

=== India ===
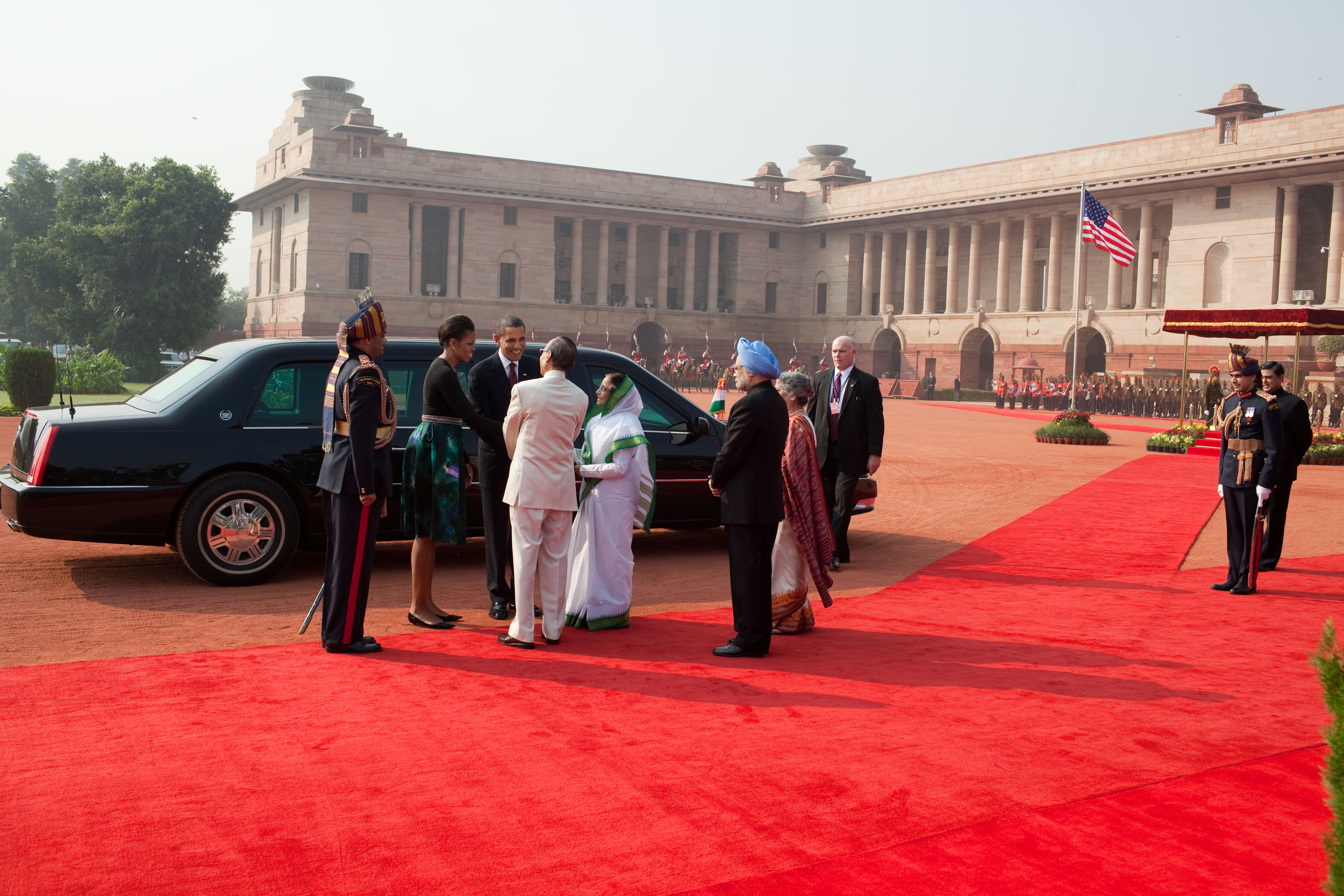
Barack and Michelle Obama met by President Pratibha Patil and the Prime Minister Manmohan Singh, together with their spouses, 8 November 2010. Foreign leaders in India are typically received at the Rashtrapati Bhavan, the official residence for the president of India.

Foreign leaders are received at the Rashtrapati Bhavan in New Delhi during state visits. The dignitary first receives the salute from the President's Bodyguard (PBG), and the Tri-Services Guard of Honour. Heads of state are also given a 21-gun salute, with a 19-gun salute being to heads of government. The massed bands and the commander of the guard of honour is chosen by a rotation between the Indian Army, Navy, and Air Force. In 2015, Wing Commander Pooja Thakur became the first female officer to lead the guard of honour for a foreign leader. All military honours are organized by Section D of the Ministry of Defence.

State banquets are also held for foreign dignitaries at the Rashtrapati Bhavan which are hosted by the president of India. Over 100 guests are invited to attend state banquets, including the vice-president of India, the prime minister of India, as well as government officials and leaders of the ruling party.

=== Israel ===
The president of the State of Israel, in their position as head of state, leads the welcoming events and is the official host of foreign leaders who visit Israel. A guard of honor made up of personnel of all the service branches of the Israel Defense Forces (IDF) are usually lined up at the main V.I.P terminal of Ben Gurion International Airport. Following the British precedent, the chief of military protocol reports to the visitor, in Hebrew:

"[תואר רשמי של המבקר: לדוגמא, כבוד הנשיא], משמר כבוד של חיילי צבא ההגנה לישראל, ערוך ונכון לסקירתך. אדוני!"
"[title of the visitor: e.g. Honorable President], a guard of honor of the soldiers of the Israel Defense Forces, is formed up and ready for your inspection. Sir!"

While historically, guests were also greeted by a 21-gun salute, the practice has since been discontinued.

During some state visits, the itinerary has included a visit to the Yad Vashem memorial. There the leader, accompanied by the prime minister, will rekindle the Eternal Flame, and will also lay a wreath in memorial of the 6 million Jews murdered in the holocaust.

=== Italy ===
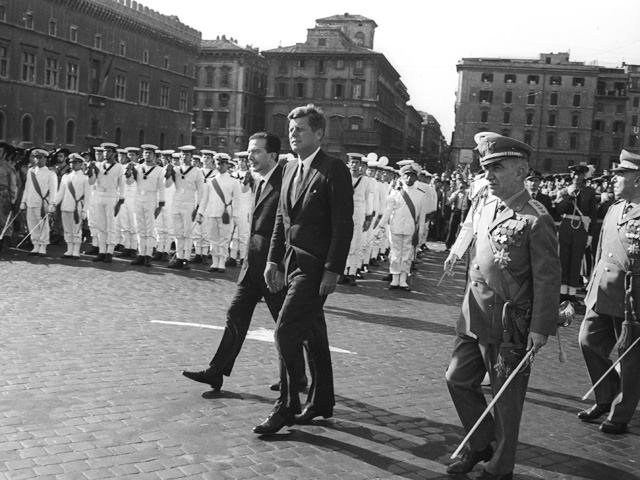
John F. Kennedy arrives at the Tomb of the Unknown Soldier in Rome with Italian Minister of Defence Giulio Andreotti, 1 July 1963. Visits to the tomb are a typical component of state visits to Italy.

When dignitaries arrive in the Italian capital of Rome, they are received in a short reception ceremony at the airport by the head of the Diplomatic Ceremonial Office among other officials, who then briefly entertain the guest in the boardroom to allow the handling of airport formalities. Arrival honors for foreign dignitaries visiting Rome are held either at the Quirinal Palace (official residence of the president of the Italian Republic) or the Palazzo Chigi (official residence of the prime minister of the Italian Republic). During the ceremony, the guard of honor is provided by a military unit (most likely the Corazzieri and a selected ceremonial unit such as the Honour Company "Goito" from the 1° Regiment "Granatieri di Sardegna") and a supporting military band that performs 3 Ruffles and flourishes known as "Onori" ("Honors") prior to playing the national anthem of the dignitary's home country and Il Canto degli Italiani. In recent years, the Bersaglieri, the Carabinieri, and the Italian Navy have provided honor guards for the ceremony.

The rest of the day includes bilateral meetings, one on one conversations, a joint press conference, and a state dinner, where the exchange of gifts and the awarding of honors takes place. The next day sees the laying of wreaths at the Tomb of the Unknown Soldier in the Altar of the Homeland. All protocol events in the capital are organized by the State Ceremonial Office. In particular, the Ceremonial Office of the Ministry of Defense handles protocol related to the Italian Armed Forces, and the Diplomatic Ceremonial Office of the Ministry of Foreign Affairs handles protocol related to the diplomatic corps.

=== Japan ===
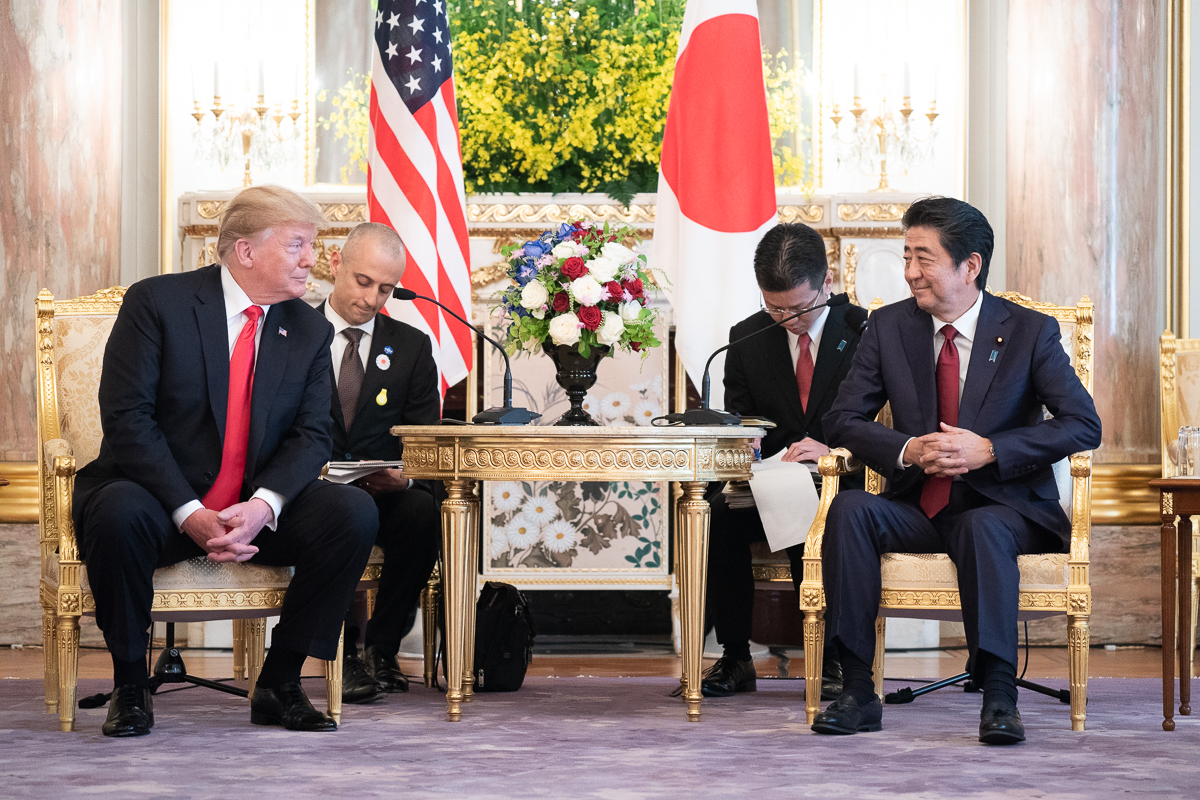
Donald Trump with Prime Minister Shinzō Abe, during an American state visit to Japan in May 2019

Japan extends invitations for state visitors and official visitors aims to promote the friendship and relation between Japan and the country of the invitee. In addition to state and official visits, the Japanese government also extends several other forms of invitations to visit the country.

The invitation of official practical visitors, practical visitors, and visitors to Japan's Ministry of Foreign Affairs aim to promote negotiations, to strengthen security and to be used for policy coordination, etc.

The invitation of ministers is an invitation extended to ministers from other countries, and aims to have them deepen their understanding of Japan and send information about Japan based on the knowledge obtained through invitations through conference, inspection, etc. with Japanese VIPs and experts.

The invitation of strategic practitioners is an invitation extended to certain members in certain positions or those who are expected to hold a certain leadership position in the future, in political, economic, governmental, academic, etc., in foreign countries or international organizations. It aims to promote understanding of Japan's various policies and fields such as culture and society, to facilitate the promotion of Japan's foreign policy through personal connections with Japanese experts, and to promote pro-Japan in the medium- and long-term through briefings with private experts, Japanese cultural experiences, and local visits.

The invitation programs in Japan
| | Visitor | Stay | Reception | Talk with Emperor | Luncheon | Banquet |
|---|---|---|---|---|---|---|
| State Visitor | Monarch, president, etc. | Akasaka Palace | Yes | Yes | Luncheon with the prime minister | Banquet at the palace |
| Official Visitor | Prince, prime minister, etc. | Akasaka Palace | Yes | Yes | Luncheon at the palace | Banquet with the prime minister |
| Official Practical Visitor | A person equivalent to a state visitor or an official visitor | A strictly secured public accommodation | No | Yes | No | No |
| Practical Visitor | A person equivalent to a state visitor or an official visitor | A public accommodation | No | Yes/No | No | No |
| Visitor to the Ministry of Foreign Affairs | The secretary-general of the United Nations, etc. | A public accommodation | No | No | No | No |

During the state visits by people belonging to the upper two categories, guards of honour are mounted by the Imperial Guard of the National Police Agency and the 302nd Military Police Company of the Japan Self-Defense Forces.

=== Kyrgyzstan ===
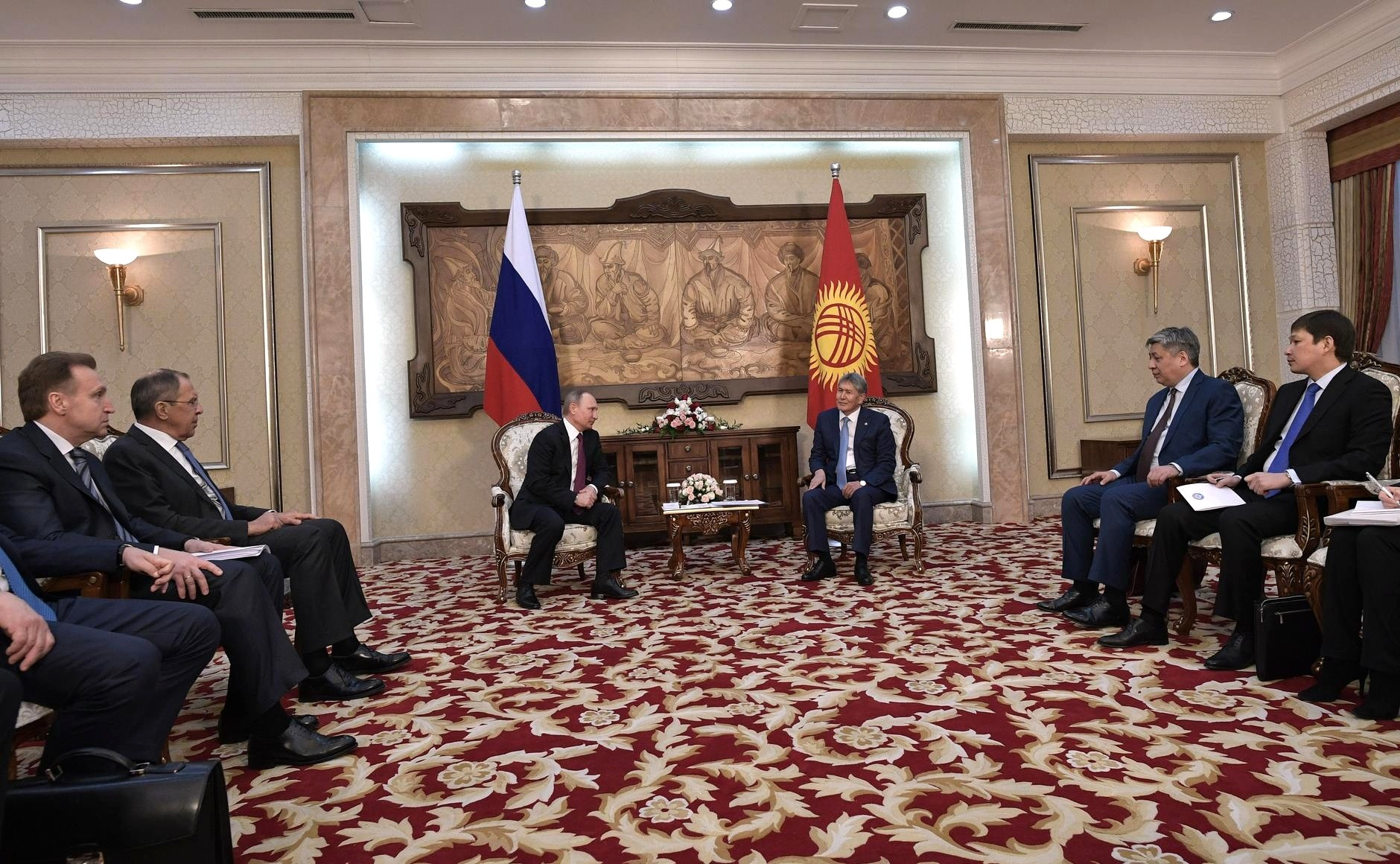
Bilateral meetings during state visits to Kyrgyzstan typically take place at the Ala Archa State Residence.

State visits are planned in accordance with the Ministry of Foreign Affairs one month in advance. Arrival ceremonies for state visits to Kyrgyzstan typically take place at Manas International Airport with the participation of the Honour Guard Battalion of the 701st Military Unit of the National Guard and the Band of the General Staff of the Armed Forces of Kyrgyzstan. A wreath-laying ceremony is also held at Victory Square. A bilateral meeting, press conference, and state dinner are all held at the Ala Archa State Residence.

The Kyrgyz official welcoming group includes the chairman of the Supreme Council, the prime minister, and the minister of foreign affairs. The official morning breakfast reception takes place from 11:00 am to 3:00 pm. Arrival ceremonies are also held at the state residences all over the country.

=== Madagascar ===
A state visit by President Emmanuel Macron of France from 23 to 25 April 2025 was declared a public holiday.

=== Mexico ===
State visits to Mexico City are held on a regular basis. Arrival ceremonies are usually held at the National Palace, the president's workplace or at Mexico City International Airport. On certain occasions, a full honors ceremony with the participation of the National Guard's Presidential Guards Corps are held at Campo Marte, where the corps' two military police brigades are stationed.

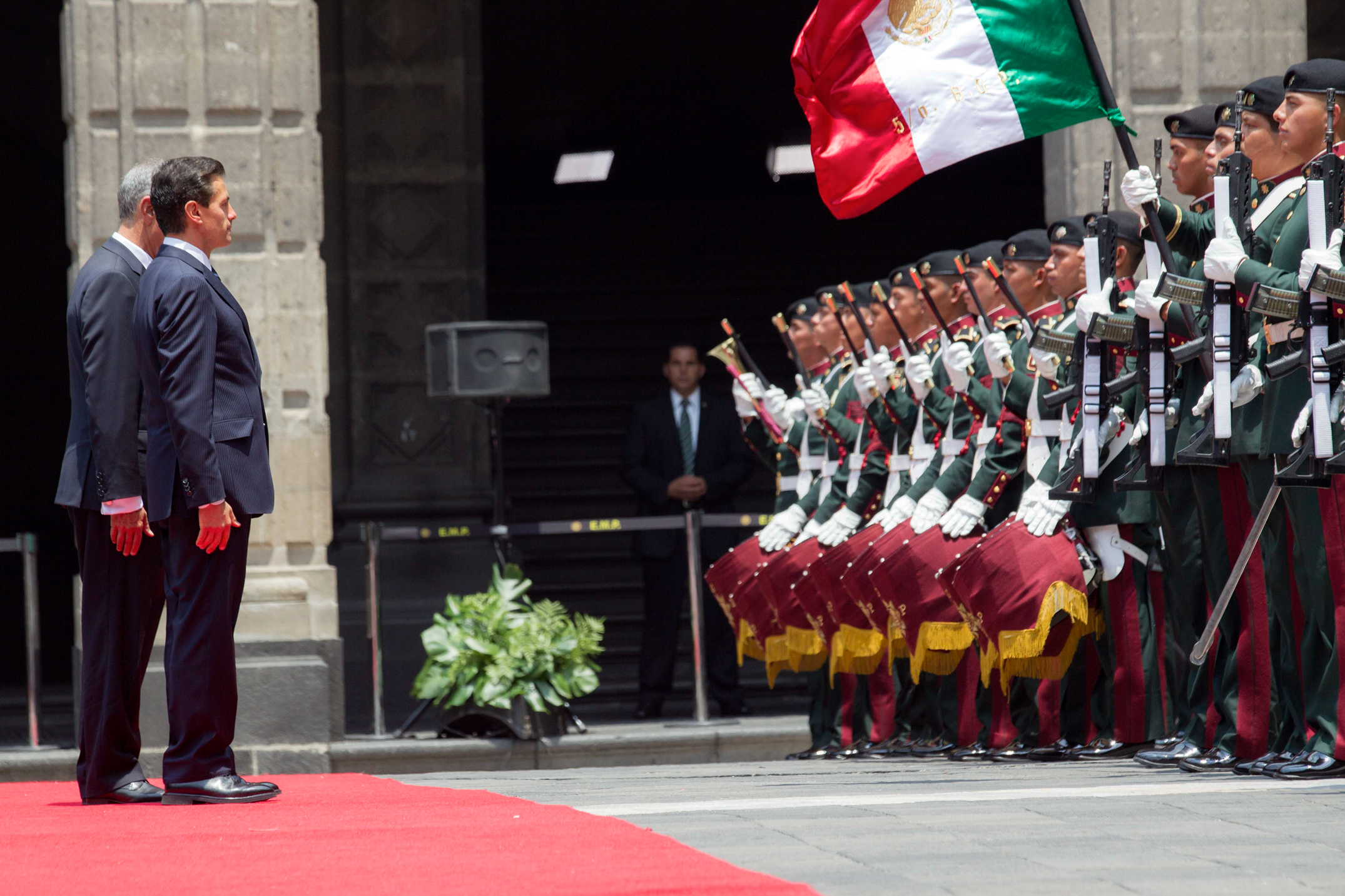
Marcelo Rebelo de Sousa inspecting the guard of honor, 17 July 2017. An inspection of the Mexican guard of honour typically occurs near the end of the state arrival ceremony.

The arrival ceremony begins with a platoon of National Guards presenting arms at the arrival of the state guest at the entrance of the National Palace. After the state guest arrives with the president of Mexico (and their first partner, if present) in the palace' south courtyard the NG's Presidential Guards honor guard company presents arms while the Representative Music Band of the Mexican Armed Forces plays the anthems of the two countries (the Himno Nacional Mexicano is always played first). Then the president of Mexico introduces members of their cabinet before the visiting dignitary introduces members of their delegation accompanying them on this visit. After this is done, the commander of the National Guard's honour guard company then delivers the following report to the dignitary:

“With your permission Mr/Madam President of the United Mexican States, I am the commander of the honour guard of the (states dignitary's position) and I invite you to review the guard of honour present, sir/ma'am."

The president and the dignitary then inspect the guard, paying homage to the Mexican flag and the flag of the guest country along the way. The ceremony then ends and the two go into the palace to begin their bilateral meeting. The Campo Marte ceremony is similar in style to the palace ceremony with the main differences being a 21-gun salute, opening remarks, and the military parade being added to the program. The unit responsible currently for the 21-gun salute is the State Honors Artillery Battery, coming under the 1st Artillery Battalion (Separate) of the 1st Army Corps.

=== Moldova ===
The State Diplomatic Protocol (SDP) of the Ministry of Foreign Affairs and European Integration of Moldova organizes activities concerning state visits to the Moldovan capital of Chișinău. All state arrival ceremonies take place at the Presidential Administration or the Presidential Palace, involving the Honor Guard Company and the Presidential Band. During the inspection, the foreign guest will greet the personnel of the company in the Romanian language (the dignitary will say buna ziua or "good morning" to which the soldiers will respond by saying salutari or "greetings"). Foreign guests may also visit the Gagauz capital of Comrat.

=== Morocco ===
State visits to Morocco typically involve a reception by the king of Morocco, government officials and members of the royal family, as well as a state dinner offered by the king at the Royal Palace of Rabat. The visiting leader may also make a speech to a joint session of the country's parliament.

=== Netherlands ===
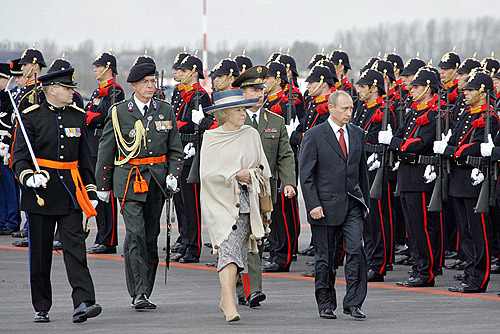
Queen Beatrix and Vladimir Putin participating in a formal welcome ceremony during his state visit to the Netherlands, 1 November 2005

State visits in the Netherlands revolve around and are centered on the capital of Amsterdam. A characteristic of a state visit is that it is usually carried out by a foreign head of state, rather than a head of government. Upon arrival to the country, the dignitary will be given a tour through the capital, which includes a wreath-laying ceremony at the National Monument. Foreign dignitaries are usually received by the monarch at the Royal Palace of Amsterdam, where they receive a guard of honour formed by the Grenadiers' and Rifles Guard Regiment upon arrival. It is here where all matters of state and bilateral meetings take place over the course of the visit.

During a state visit, the Dutch monarch always hosts a state dinner in honor of the guest, sometimes at the Royal Palace in Amsterdam and at other times at the monarch's residence at the Noordeinde Palace in The Hague. It is customary to be awarded the Knight Grand Cross Order of the Netherlands Lion during state visits.

=== North Korea ===
Although state visits to North Korea do not happen often, they are held to the highest standard when they occur. Portraits of the visiting leader and the Supreme Leader of North Korea are hung all over the city and at Pyongyang Sunan International Airport, where the arrival ceremony takes place. During the ceremony, the Guard of Honour Company of the Korean People's Army's Supreme Guard Command, made up of servicemen from the Ground Forces, Navy, Air Force, Special Operations and the Strategic Forces, together with a platoon of the Worker-Peasant Red Guards renders honours while the Central Band of the KPA performs the visiting anthem and Aegukka, the anthem of the DPRK. After this, the commander of the guard reports to the leader before they inspect the troops and review a marchpast. They then ride in a motorcade that takes them to the Paekhwawon State Guest House and or the Kumsusan Guesthouse for bilateral negotiations. The former guest house was first used for state visits in the early 2000s for the visits of Madeleine Albright and Junichiro Koizumi and became relevant once again during the 2018–19 Korean peace process. The latter was only built in the spring of 2019 in time for the visit of the Chinese President and General Secretary of the Chinese Communist Party. En route to the guesthouse, a Korean Children's Union guard of honour company takes its position to award an honorary red neckerchief to the visiting leader in the name of all members present, and in addition, flower bouquets can be given by representatives on behalf of the KPA, the people of Pyongyang, and the city government.

Notable state visits held in the 21st century were those by South Korean leaders such as Roh Moo-hyun in 2007 and Moon Jae In in 2018, as well as Chinese leader Xi Jinping that same year. During Xi's visit, he became the first Chinese Paramount leader to visit the Kumsusan Palace of the Sun and took part in the reopening of the Arirang Mass Games at Rungrado 1st of May Stadium. For many state visits, the Korean People's Army State Merited Chorus and Symphony Orchestra have performed pieces native to the visitors homeland, such as Katyusha during Vladimir Putin's visit in 2000. Other lower-level world leaders who have undertaken state visits to the DPRK include Cuban leader Miguel Diaz-Canel in November 2018 and Mongolian President Tsakhiagiin Elbegdorj in 2013, with the latter being played down as it did not include a meeting with Chairman Kim Jong Un.

=== Norway ===
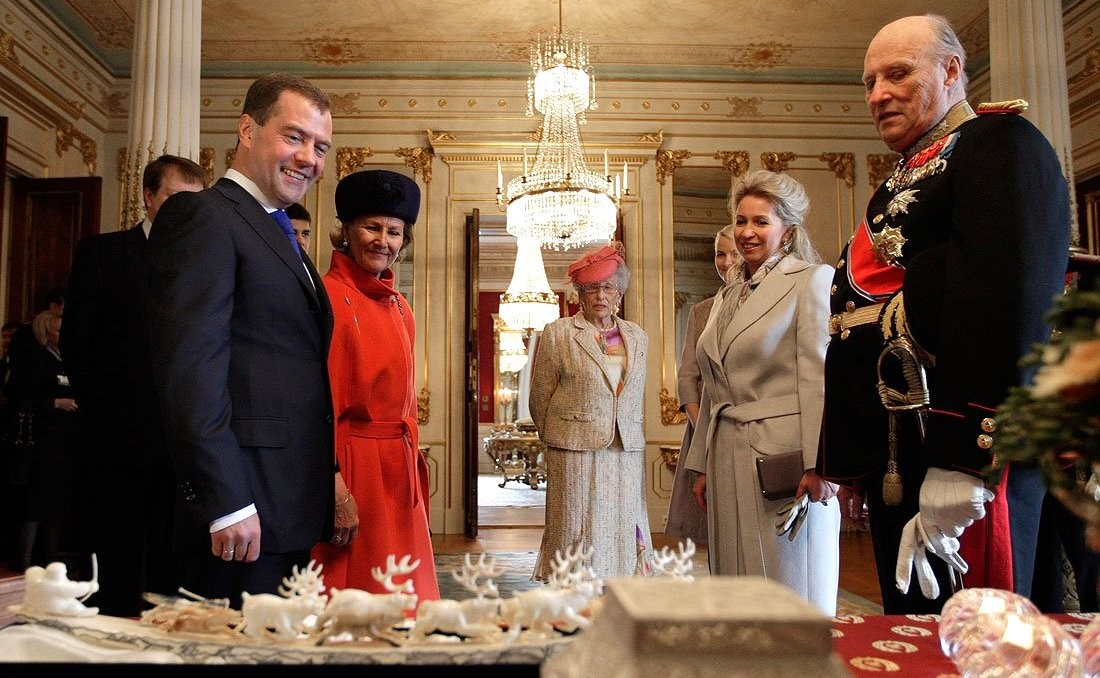
Dmitry Medvedev exchanges gifts with Harald V of Norway. A formal gift exchange is typically made at the Bird Room of the Royal Palace.

State visits to the Norwegian capital of Oslo begin with the inspecting of the 3rd Company, Hans Majestet Kongens Garde at the Royal Palace by the visiting dignitary and the Norwegian monarch. Once they are in the palace, the monarch takes the dignitary to the Bird Room to engage in an exchange of gifts. The visit also includes a wreath-laying ceremony at Akershus Fortress, which is also an official residence of the prime minister of Norway. In the evening, a gala dinner hosted by the royal family of Norway is held at the Royal Palace in honour of the visiting head of state.

As it refers to state visits by the monarch of Norway, they are always accompanied by the Norwegian foreign minister and representatives of the Government. Between two and four state visits to Oslo and royal visits to other countries are made per year, usually by the reigning monarch.

=== Philippines ===
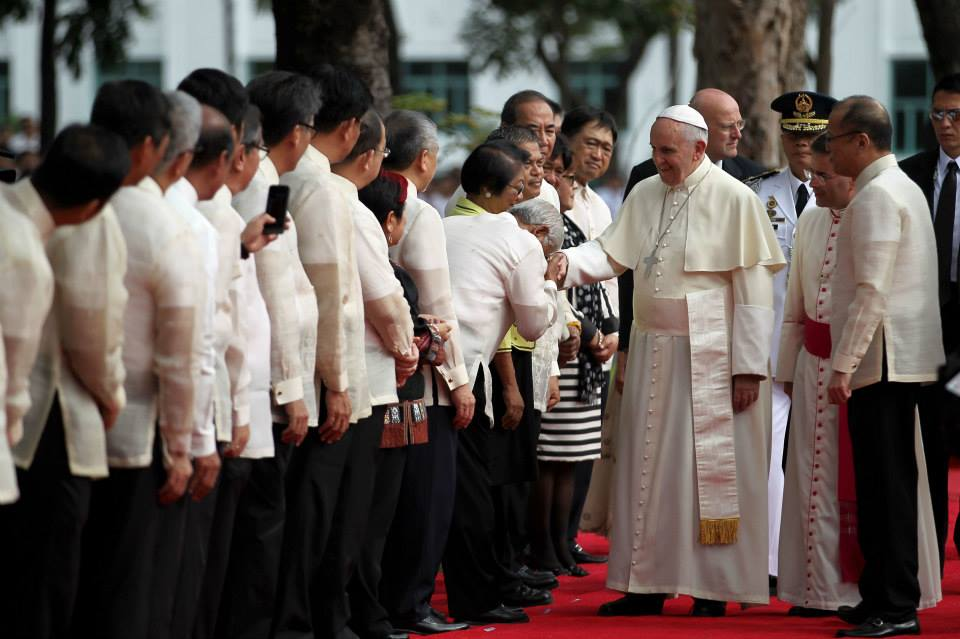
Pope Francis with President Benigno Aquino III heading towards the Malacañan Palace during the papal visit to the Philippines in January 2015

In the Philippines, state visits are organized by the Department of Foreign Affairs and the Office of the President, adhering to established diplomatic protocols. Visiting dignitaries typically arrive at Villamor Air Base in Pasay. Upon arrival, they are accorded military honors and welcomed by local government officials, usually Cabinet members, and occasionally, the President of the Philippines. For instance, during Pope Francis's visit in 2015, he was welcomed by then-President Benigno Aquino III and several Cabinet officials.

A customary component of state visits is the wreath-laying ceremony at the Rizal Monument in Rizal Park, Manila, where the visiting dignitary is received by the Mayor of Manila. This act honors Dr. José Rizal, widely considered to be the national hero of the Philippines, and symbolizes the visiting leader's respect for Filipino history and values.

The official welcome continues at Malacañang Palace, where the visiting leader is received at the Kalayaan Hall Grounds. Arrival honors are rendered once more, including the playing of both national anthems by a military band. Afterwards, they ascend the grand staircase and sign the Official Guest Book in the Reception Hall. Later that evening, a state dinner is hosted in honor of the visiting leader, often held at the Aguinaldo State Dining Room or the Rizal Ceremonial Hall. The event includes an exchange of toasts and may feature cultural performances showcasing Filipino heritage. As a gesture of goodwill, the Philippines may confer national honors upon the visiting dignitary, such as the Order of Lakandula or the Order of Sikatuna.

To ensure public safety and facilitate the smooth conduct of state visits, local authorities may declare suspensions of classes and government work. In 2015, several local governments and schools suspended class during Pope Francis's visit due to road closures for the pontiff's motorcade. During Chinese leader Xi Jinping's state visit to the Philippines in November 2018, the government of Manila and the barangays of Fort Bonifacio, Pinagsama, and Western Bicutan in Taguig suspended classes and government work due to road closures and security.

=== Poland ===
State visits take place on a regular basis in Poland. Ceremonial honours a provided by the Representative Honor Guard Regiment of the Polish Armed Forces at the Presidential Palace. Musical accompaniment is provided by the Representative Central Band of the Polish Armed Forces.

The White Hall in the Presidential Palace is used to host foreign heads of state. The hall is located at the main entrance from the courtyard, where the welcoming ceremony takes place.

=== Russia ===
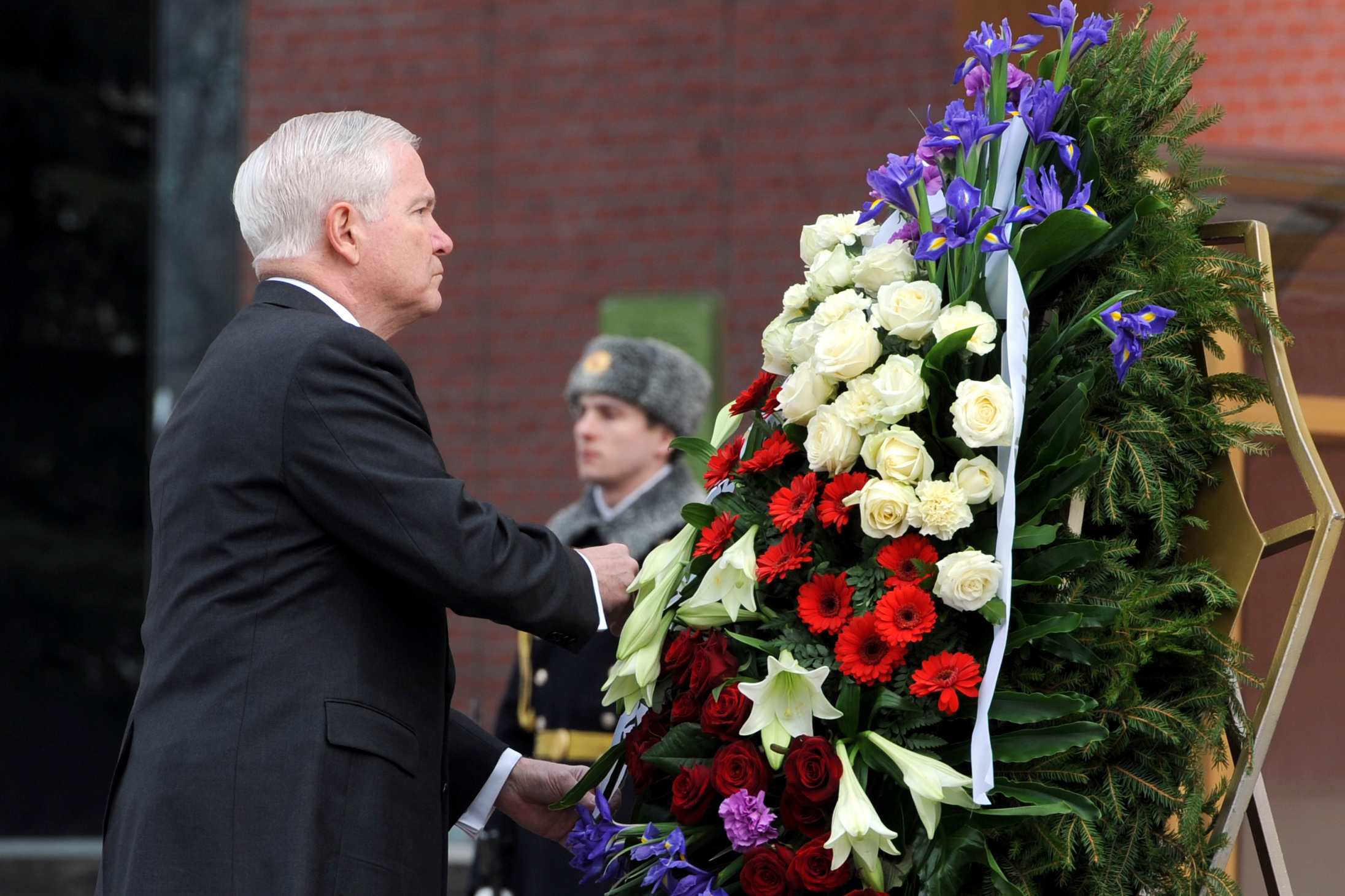
The Russian Foreign Ministry organizes the itinerary for official visits to the country, scheduling events such as Robert Gates laying a wreath at the Tomb of the Unknown Soldier, 22 March 2011.

The Department of State Protocol of the Russian Foreign Ministry is responsible for organizing the itinerary for state visits to the country. It was founded on 18 December 1991, by Decree No. 291 of President Boris Yeltsin on the basis of the Foreign Policy Service of the RSFSR. The decree, in effect, provided a new unified protocol practice in the Russian Federation. Its duties range from organizing invitations to the country to developing an event schedule for the dignitary's visit. Common practices organized by the department include protocol events meetings, wreath-laying, breakfast, and lunch, among others. The Presidential Protocol Office in the Presidential Administration of the Russian Federation also serves a similar purpose.

A foreign head of state or government receives arrival honours from the 154th Preobrazhensky Independent Commandant's Regiment and the Special Exemplary Military Band upon their arrival at the VIP terminal at Vnukovo International Airport in Moscow, where they are usually greeted by the Russian deputy foreign minister. Heads of state also take part in a welcoming ceremony with the president of Russia in the Hall of the Order of St. George of the Grand Kremlin Palace.

The following is Estonian diplomat Tiit Matsulevitš's opinion on Russian protocol for state visits:

"Russian diplomacy has a centuries-old tradition, I consider the Russian protocol to be one of the best in the world. The protocol service of Russia is very correct."

— Tiit Matsulevitš, Estonian Ambassador to Russia from 1999–2001

=== Spain ===
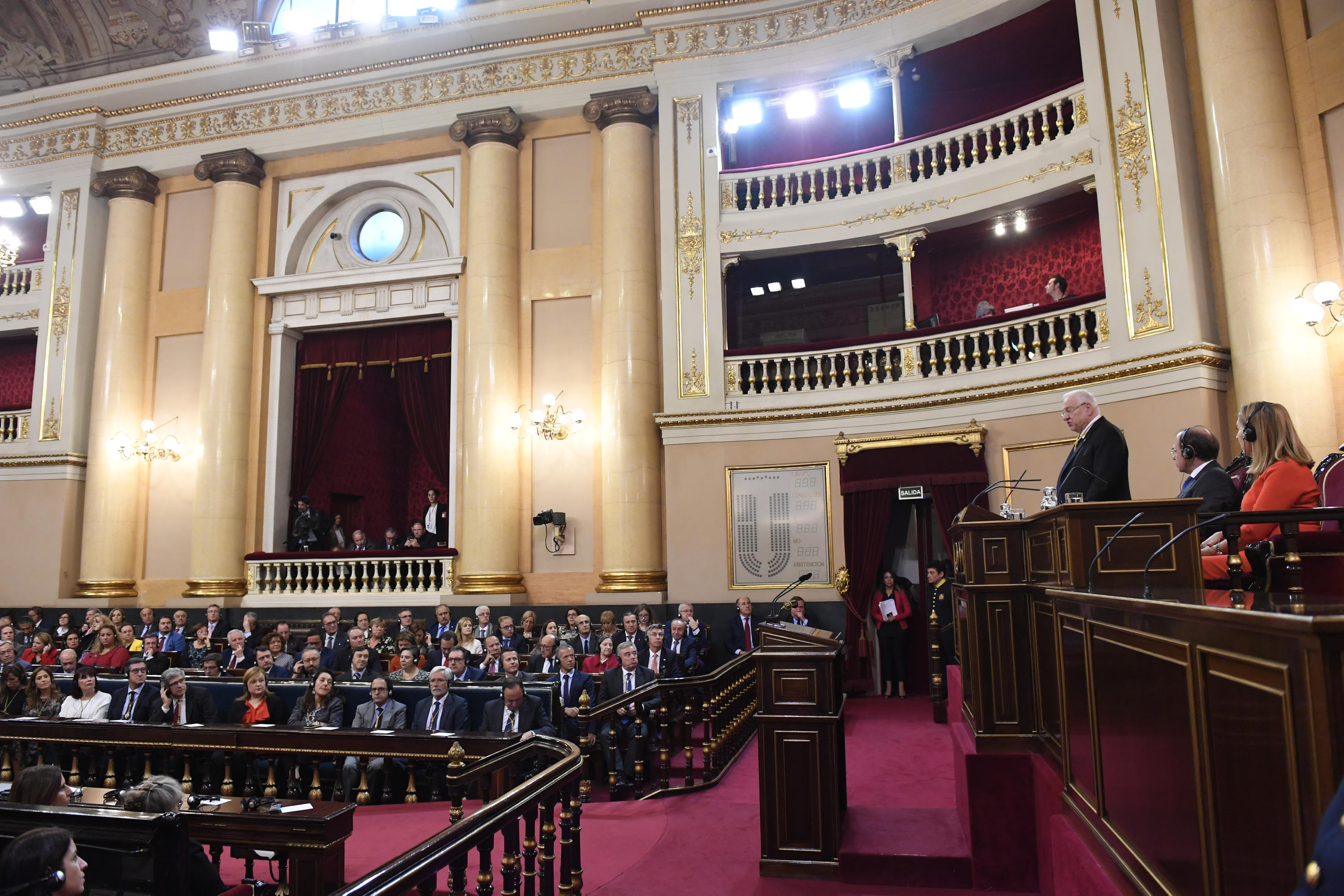
The president of Israel, Reuven Rivlin, addresses the Cortes Generales during his state visit Spain.

State visits to the Kingdom of Spain are held with the participation of the King and Queen of Spain. The day's events begin as the visiting dignitary arrives in a special vehicle at the Palacio Real in the Spanish capital of Madrid. As the dignitary arrives, units of the Spanish Royal Guard (including the Mounted Band of Timpani and Bugles and the Lancers Troop) prepares for the start of the arrival ceremony. The ceremony starts with all units presenting arms at the sound of a bugle call and performing a royal salute, with the playing of the guest anthem and the Marcha Real taking place. Once the regiment is orders arms, three senior officers from the guard (a senior commander, a bugler and a guidon bearer) approach the central grandstand to report to the guest and the king on the readiness of the regiment for inspection. They then begin their inspection, reviewing the infantry as well as the mounted units. Once the review is complete, a large military parade in the forecourt of the palace is held with the massed bands playing military music as the units march past.

The other notable state ceremony that takes place in the palace is the state dinner, which is hosted by the king, and is attended by the visiting dignitary, their delegation, the Spanish royal family, the prime minister, and other government officials. During the course of the visit, the visiting leader may deliver an address to a joint session of the bicameral Cortes Generales (composed of the Senate and the Congress of Deputies).

=== Ukraine ===
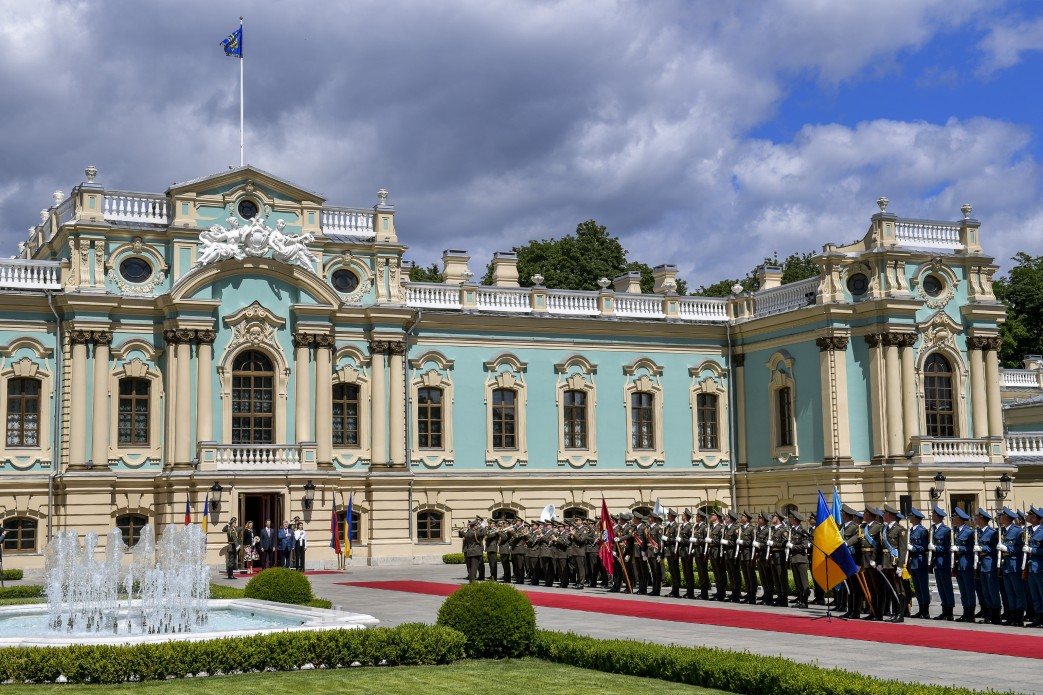
The official visit of Prince Nikolaus of Liechtenstein to Kyiv in June 2018

State visits to Ukraine are managed by the Main Department on State Protocol and Ceremonies of the Office of the President of Ukraine as well as the State Protocol Department of the Ministry of Foreign Affairs. State visits involve the president of Ukraine, the chairman of the Verkhovna Rada, and the prime minister of Ukraine. Heads of state are met at the Boryspil International Airport, during which they are met by children in Ukrainian national costumes handing them bread. after which they are driven to the Mariinskyi Palace to receive a guard of honour from the Kyiv Presidential Honor Guard Battalion. The battalion band performs national anthems of both countries, during which a 21-gun artillery salute. As the guest bows their head to the state flag of Ukraine, they greet the honor guard with the battle cry of Glory to Ukraine (the official greeting of the Armed Forces of Ukraine). After the ceremony, negotiations and a working breakfast/lunch are arranged in honor of the guest. In Kyiv, there is a tradition of laying wreaths at the Tomb of the Unknown Soldier, the ceremony of which is as follows: a march of the three man team carrying a wreath through the Alley of Glory, wreath laying in front of the eternal flame, performance of national anthems, a march past of a guard of honour. On the first day of the visit, as a rule, a public dinner is held on behalf of the president of Ukraine in honor of the head of state in the Red Hall. At the end of the state dinner, a concert of musicians is held in the White Hall. Protocol stipulates that a state visit lasts longer (3–4 days) than an official visit (2–3 days).

=== United Arab Emirates ===
The United Arab Emirates Air Force does a flyover while painting the sky in the colors of the visiting country's flag as the visiting leader's car arrives at the presidential palace with an Army mounted escort. Upon arrival, the visiting head of state is greeted by the president of the United Arab Emirates or the deputy supreme commander of the United Arab Emirates Armed Forces, where they both receive military honors from the United Arab Emirates Presidential Guard as well as a 21-gun salute from members of the Army. While inside the palace, they are also greeted by children holding flags of the UAE and of the visiting country. The entire city of Abu Dhabi is usually decorated for the visit, with flags laid out in the streets and large pictures of the two countries' leaders erected on large buildings. During the visit of Vladimir Putin in October 2019, police cars were sprayed with the Cyrillic letters "ДПС", which stands for "Дорожно-патрульная служба" (English: Roads Patrol Service).

=== United Kingdom ===
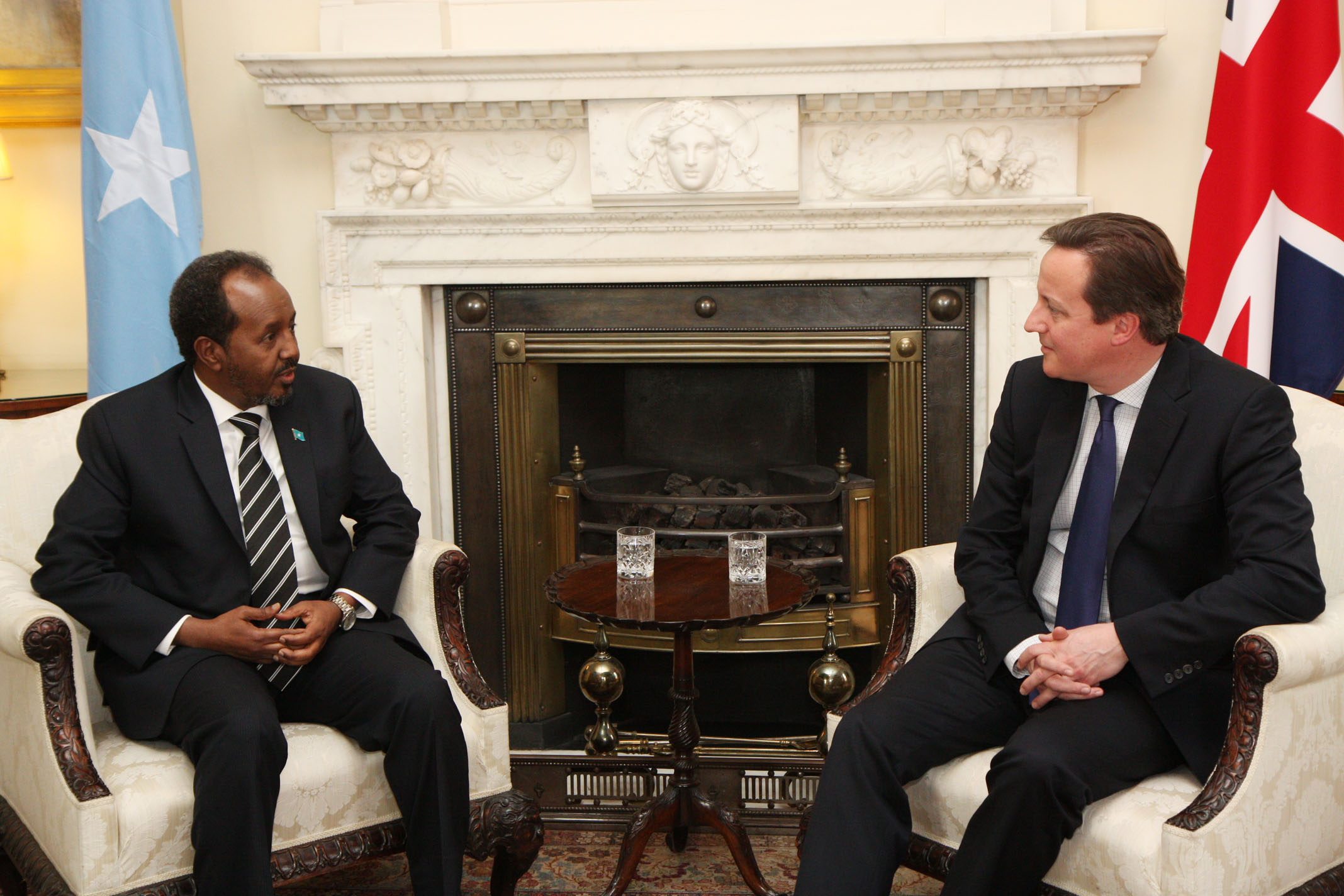
Hassan Mohamud, President of Somalia, with British Prime Minister David Cameron, during a Somalian state visit to the United Kingdom

A state visit to the United Kingdom is a royal event which involves the King and other members of the royal family. An arrival ceremony usually takes place on Horse Guards Parade (there are also some instances where it takes place at Buckingham Palace or Windsor Castle) with a guard of honour being provided by members of the King's Guard. The guard of honour will always report to the dignitary in the language of the visitor, with the report being along the lines of the following:

"Your Excellency, the guard of honour, provided by the (states name of unit), is formed up, and ready for inspection."

Depending on the area where the ceremony takes place, a march past will immediately take place following the inspection. The foreign guest and the King then travel to Buckingham Palace in a carriage procession escorted by a large number of mounted soldiers from the Household Cavalry. The welcome ceremony is accompanied by 21-gun salutes fired from Green Park and the Tower of London. Around 150 guests are invited to Buckingham Palace for the state banquet in the evening in the ballroom.

State visits do not formally occur between the United Kingdom and the 14 other Commonwealth realms, as the realms all share a common monarch and head of state. A visit conducted by the monarch to another Commonwealth realm is also not considered a state visit, but is termed a royal tour. Tours of Commonwealth realms by the monarch are conducted in their capacity as the monarch of that respective realm, and not as the British monarch. As a result, visits on behalf of the United Kingdom to other Commonwealth realms are typically conducted as official visits by the prime minister of the United Kingdom. Conversely, official visits to the United Kingdom by another Commonwealth realm is typically performed by their respective prime minister or governor-general.

=== United States ===
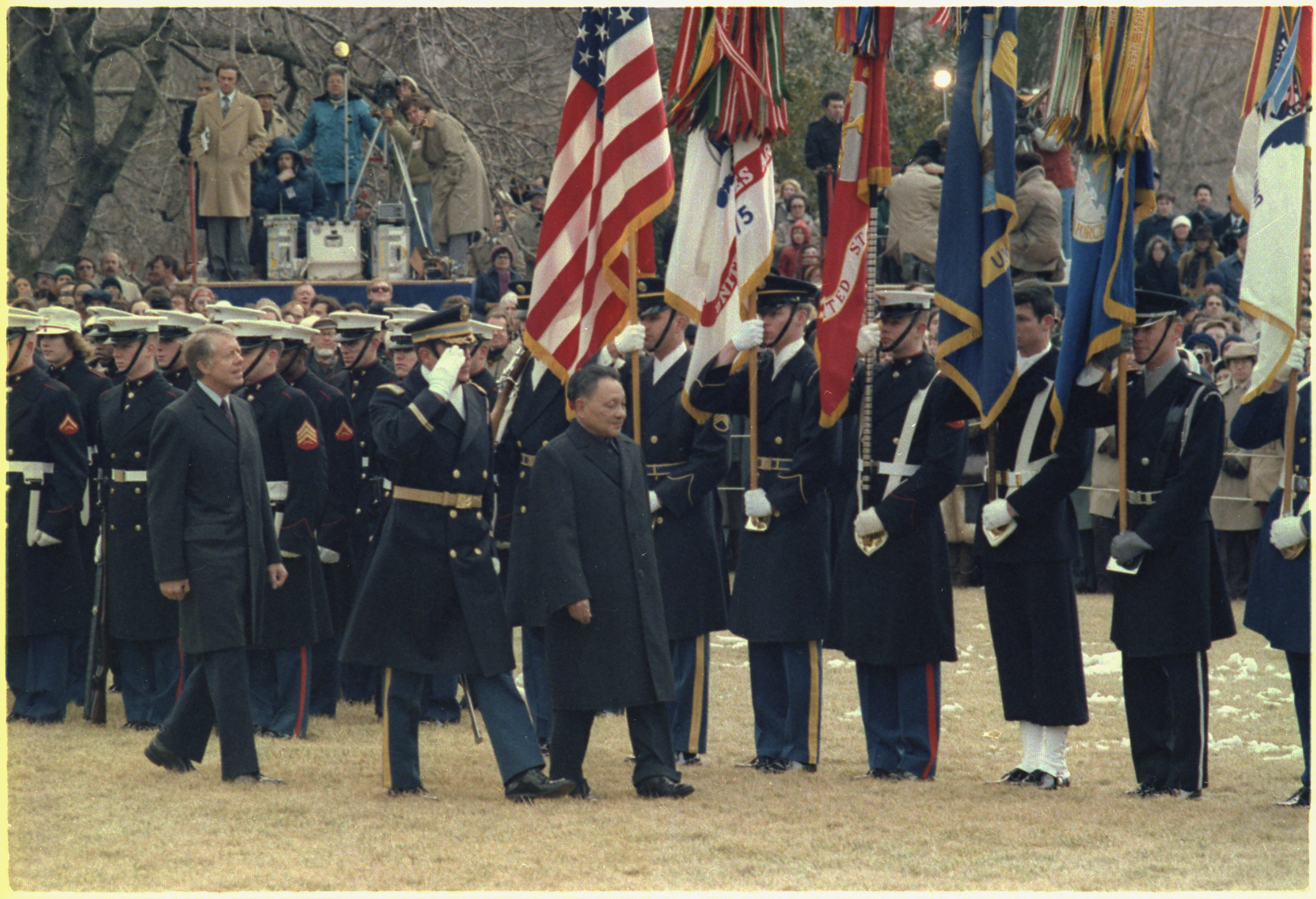
Deng Xiaoping and Jimmy Carter inspecting the joint-service honor guard during the arrival ceremony for Deng in 1979

State visits to Washington, D.C., occur only on the invitation of the president of the United States in their position as head of state and head of the federal government of the United States. Official visits refer to a visit by a head of government to Washington. During state visits, there are usually many events taking place in the capital, with the participation of hundreds of individuals. The first state visit took place in 1874 by Kalākaua of the Kingdom of Hawaii, followed by Pedro II of Brazil in 1876.

Events can range from a flight line ceremony at Joint Base Andrews, an arrival ceremony (either at the White House or The Pentagon depending on the guest), a State Department luncheon, a state dinner and an address to the Congress.

== See also ==
- Air transports of heads of state and government
- Foreign relations
- Motorcade
- Reciprocity (international relations)
- State banquet
- Summit (meeting)
