= Prague Garrison Command =

Military area

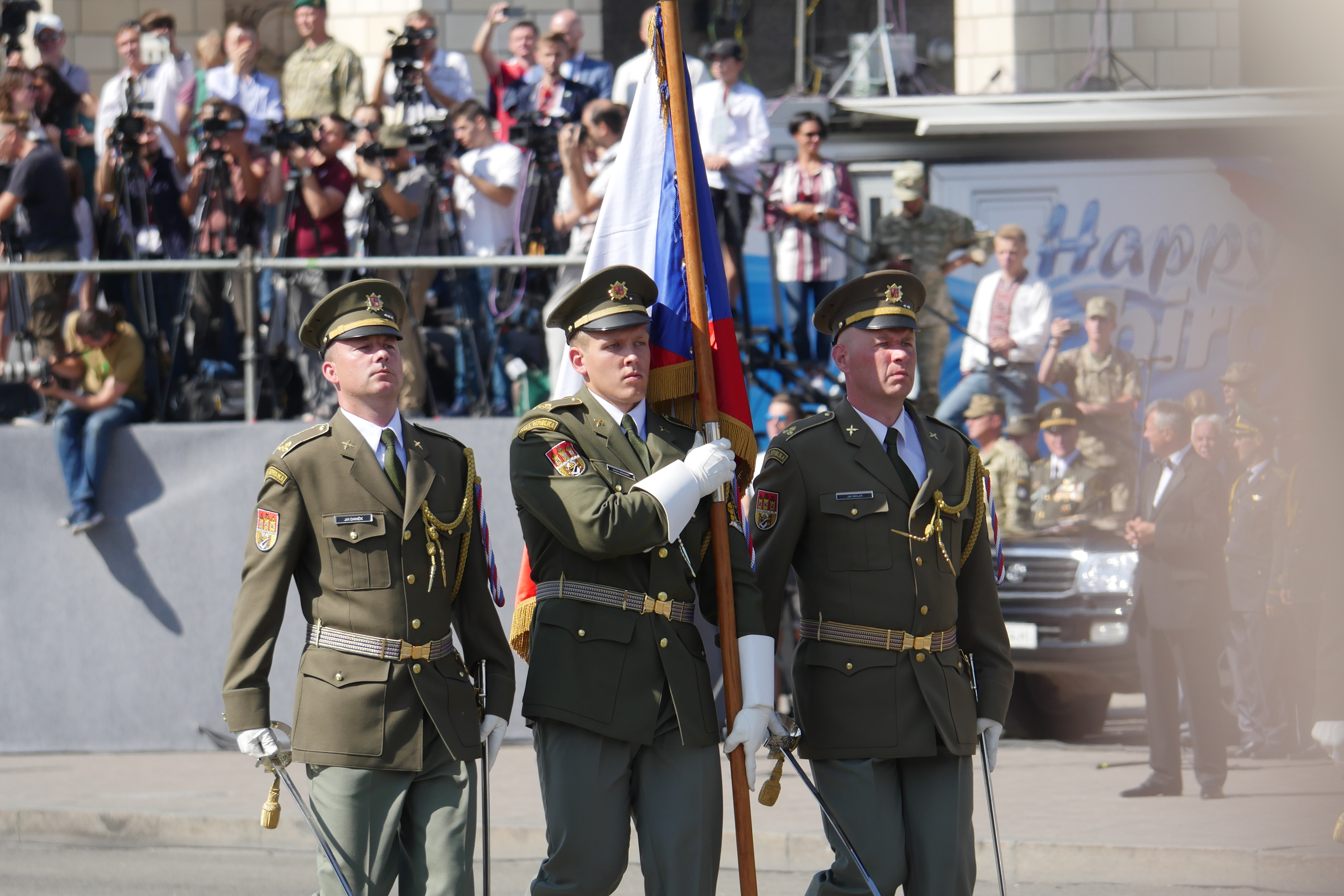
A color guard from the Honor Guard of the Czech Armed Forces, which is part of the command.

The Prague Garrison Command (Czech: Pražské velitelství) is the primary military area command of the Army of the Czech Republic tasked for the defense and security of Prague, the capital city of the Czech Republic. It is currently under the leadership of Colonel Milan Virt, with Captain Eva Cajthamlova acting as its spokeswoman. The Prague Garrison Command currently bears the honorary title of Unit of Prague Uprising.

== History ==
The Prague garrison's history is closely associated with the city's military history. The first fortified Prague military garrison was established in 1621, making it the oldest in the area that is now the Czech Republic, and one of the oldest in Europe. The first commander of this garrison was Generalissimus Albrecht von Wallenstein, the Prince of Waldstein and the Duke of Frydlant. In centuries that followed, the Prague garrison had become the most important military garrison in the country and since 1918 it was the central seat of the military leadership of independent Czechoslovakia and the ČSSR. After a military reorganisation of the armed forces took place on April 1, 2004, the Garrison Command of Prague was formed and was made the center of the armed forces garrison commands.

== Garrison activities ==
The Prague Garrison Command is the governing body resbonisble for organizing garrison events in the public. The garrison mostly contributes to ceremonial protocol by providing soldiers from the Honor Guard of CAF and the Czech Army Central Band to serve during the ceremonial activities of the President of the Czech Republic, the Prime Minister of the Czech Republic, the Minister of Defence, the Chief of Staff and foreign leaders, namely state visits to the capital.

== Organization ==
The Prague Garrison is made up of military units and installations that are permanently or temporarily on the territory of Prague. The commander of the garrison directly reports to the First Deputy Chief of the General Staff of CAF. The Command is composed of the following:

- Command and Staff
- Honor Guard of the Czech Armed Forces
- Music Service of CAF
  - Czech Army Central Band
  - Military Band Olomouc
- Kobylisy Firing Range

The Honour Guard was founded in 2005 and is currently made of 38 soldiers, including its commander. The company is also made up of three colour guard members, 27 honour guards, and four reserve members.
