= Military Office of the President of the Czech Republic =

- Vojenská kancelář prezidenta republiky (Czech)
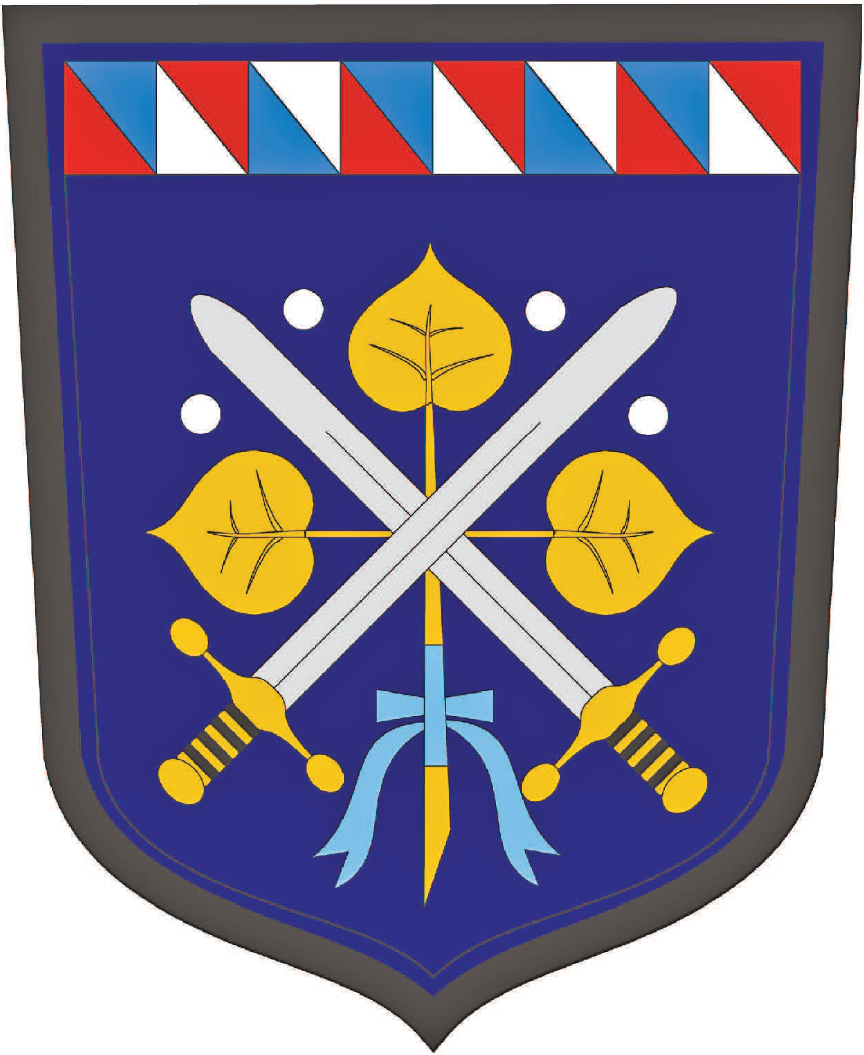
- Active: 1919 - present
- Country: Czechoslovakia (1919-1993); Czech Republic(from 1993)
- Allegiance: President of the Czech Republic
- Type: Office
- Role: Administrative support of President as a Commander in Chief and administrative control of Prague Castle Guard
- Headquarters: Prague Castle
- Website: Official website

Commanders
- Current commander: Major General Radek Hasala
- Notable commanders: Army General Antonín Hasal; Major General Oldřich Španiel

The Military Office of the President of the Czech Republic, MOPR (Czech: Vojenská kancelář prezidenta republiky, VKPR) is the official military department of the Office of the President of the Czech Republic. It serves as a separate entity of the Armed Forces of the Czech Republic from the Army of the Czech Republic and the Prague Castle Guard, although it controls most of the activities of the Castle Guard. It mostly fulfils tasks by order of the President of the Czech Republic, under Section 26 of Act No. 219, which describes the president in his/her authority as commander in chief being the superior to the Chief of Staff of the Military Office (currently Major General Radek Hasala). It also organizes military protocol during state visits of foreign leaders to Prague and approves other senior military appointments in the armed forces. It was founded on New Year's Day in 1919 by order of President Tomáš Garrigue Masaryk. It was later codified by act 654/1919 Call. from 5 December 1919 that formally established the Office of the President of Czechoslovak Republic and its military department. Its functions were interrupted at the onset of the Second World War, when Nazi Germany invaded and occupied Prague on 15 March 1939. After 1940, its functions were carried out in London while serving the government in exile. It continued after the return of the government to Prague in May 1945 under the command of Brigadier General Oldřich Španiel who was Chief of the Office in London from 1944 to April 1945. The office continued to function in its role for the presidents of Czechoslovakia until the dissolution of Czechoslovakia in 1993 when it became the Military Office of the President of the Czech Republic.

== See also ==
- President of the Czech Republic
- Armed Forces of the Czech Republic
- Prague Castle Guard

== External Sources ==
- Prague Castle
- Uniforms of the MOPR
