= Prague Castle Guard =

Ceremonial Guard

- Hradní stráž (Czech)
- Active: 1918
- Country: Czech Republic
- Allegiance: President of the Czech Republic
- Branch: Military Office of the President of the Czech Republic
- Type: Infantry
- Role: Protection of Presidential Seat/Ceremonial Duties
- Size: Brigade
- Headquarters: Prague
- Motto: "Pravda vítězí" (Truth prevails)
- March: K Defilé (On Parade)

Commanders
- Current commander: Colonel Jaroslav Ackermann

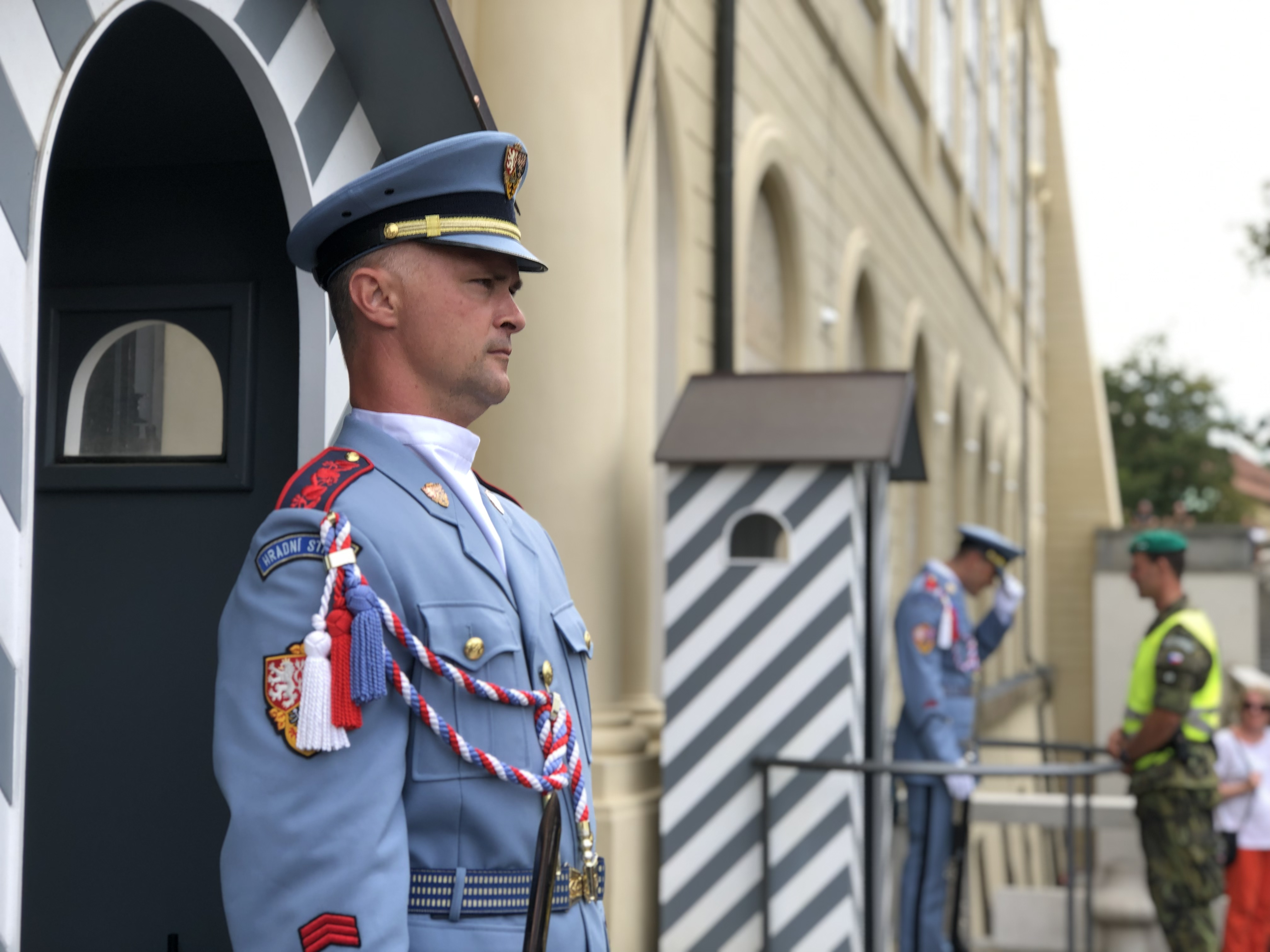
A Prague Castle Guard on duty in summer uniform.

The Prague Castle Guard or simply the Castle Guard (Czech: Hradní stráž) is a specific and autonomous unit of the Armed Forces of the Czech Republic directly subordinate to the Military Office of the President of the Czech Republic. Its main task is to guard and defend the seat of the President of the Czech Republic at the Prague Castle.

Although its most visible activity comprises ceremonial duty within the Prague Castle, most of the unit's 890 soldiers are tasked with actual protection of compounds belonging to the Presidential Office, whereby they serve in standard uniforms armed with modern weaponry.

== History ==
During the period 1939 to 1945 its duties were performed by the 1st Battalion of the Government Army.

During the communist regime, the Castle Guard faded. On December 15, 1952, it ceased to be part of the Czechoslovak People's Army and became the 14th Special Battalion of the 1st Mechanized Brigade (or Unit 2295) of the Internal Troops of the Ministry of the Interior passed into the competence of the Ministry of the Interior, who performed the tasks of today's castle guard during the period of the Czechoslovak Socialist Republic.

After the reorganization in 1966, the Castle Guard, as the 7th Special Battalion, was subordinated to the Civil Defense Staff of the Ministry of the Interior.

On 1 March 1970, the Castle Guard of the Czechoslovak Socialist Republic was established by order of the Minister of the Interior and in 1976 was put back under Ministry of the Interior.

However, in the performance of security tasks, it remained subordinated to the 5th SNB Department. This situation was changed only by Act No. 20 in 1990, which returned the Castle Guard to the Ministry of Defense.

In 2006, Second World War veterans took part in an initiative aimed at replacing the Castle Guard uniforms, signing a letter proposing to President Václav Klaus that the Castle be guarded by soldiers in the uniforms of Czechoslovak Legionaries from the First World War.

From 2018 to 2021, soldiers of the Prague Castle Guard were also being deployed in Afghanistan as part of Czech Army deployment in Resolute Support Mission. There they served as Guardian Angels providing protection outside of allied military bases primarily to Czech Army helicopter instructors that were training Afghan National Army pilots.

== Organizational structure ==
The Castle Guard is a brigade unit with a total of 900 soldiers with the following structure:

- Headquarters
  - Castle Guard Staff
  - Personal staff
  - Logistics
- 1st Battalion
  - Battalion Headquarters
  - 3 guard companies
- 2nd Battalion
  - Battalion Headquarters
  - 3 guard companies
- Band of the Castle Guards and the Police
- Support Company
  - Motorcycle Platoon
  - Support Platoon
  - Transport Platoon
  - K-9 Platoon
- 2 Active Reserves platoons

As of 2023, the Castle Guard consisted of 888 soldiers and 43 civilian employees with additional 40 soldiers of Active Reserves.

== Symbols ==
On October 13, 1921, a banner was ceremoniously handed over to the Castle Guard by President Tomáš Masaryk in the courtyard of Prague Castle. The banner displayed the emblem of the Castle Guard on one side and the emblem of the president of the Republic and the slogan Truth prevails on the other side. The banner was intended for use on festive occasions. On February 20, 1993, then-President Václav Havel gave a military banner to the Castle Guard, and since 1993, it was located in the office of the Chief of the Castle Guard. The unit also has an emblem and a seal.

== Gallery ==
=== Ceremonial duty ===
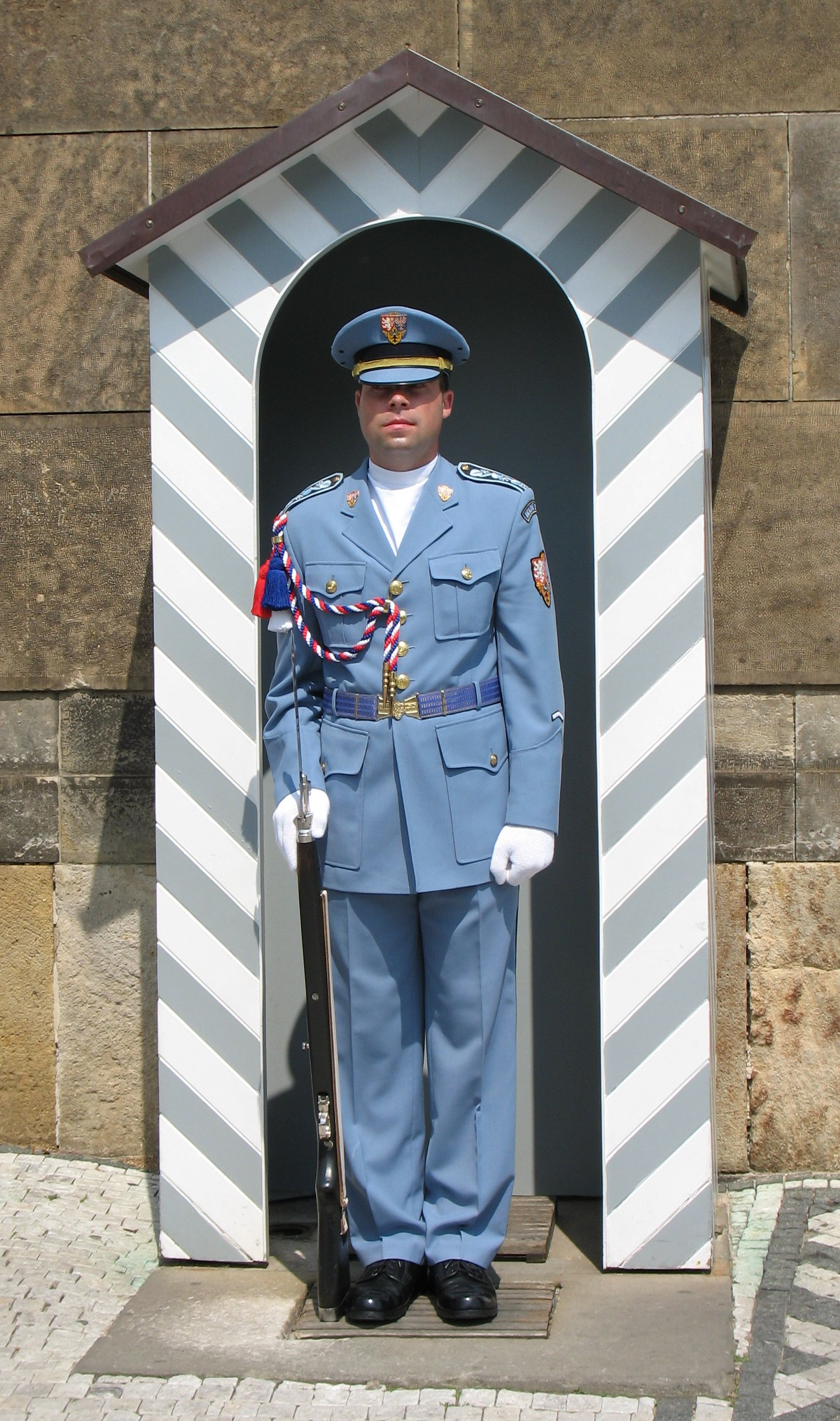
Summer uniform

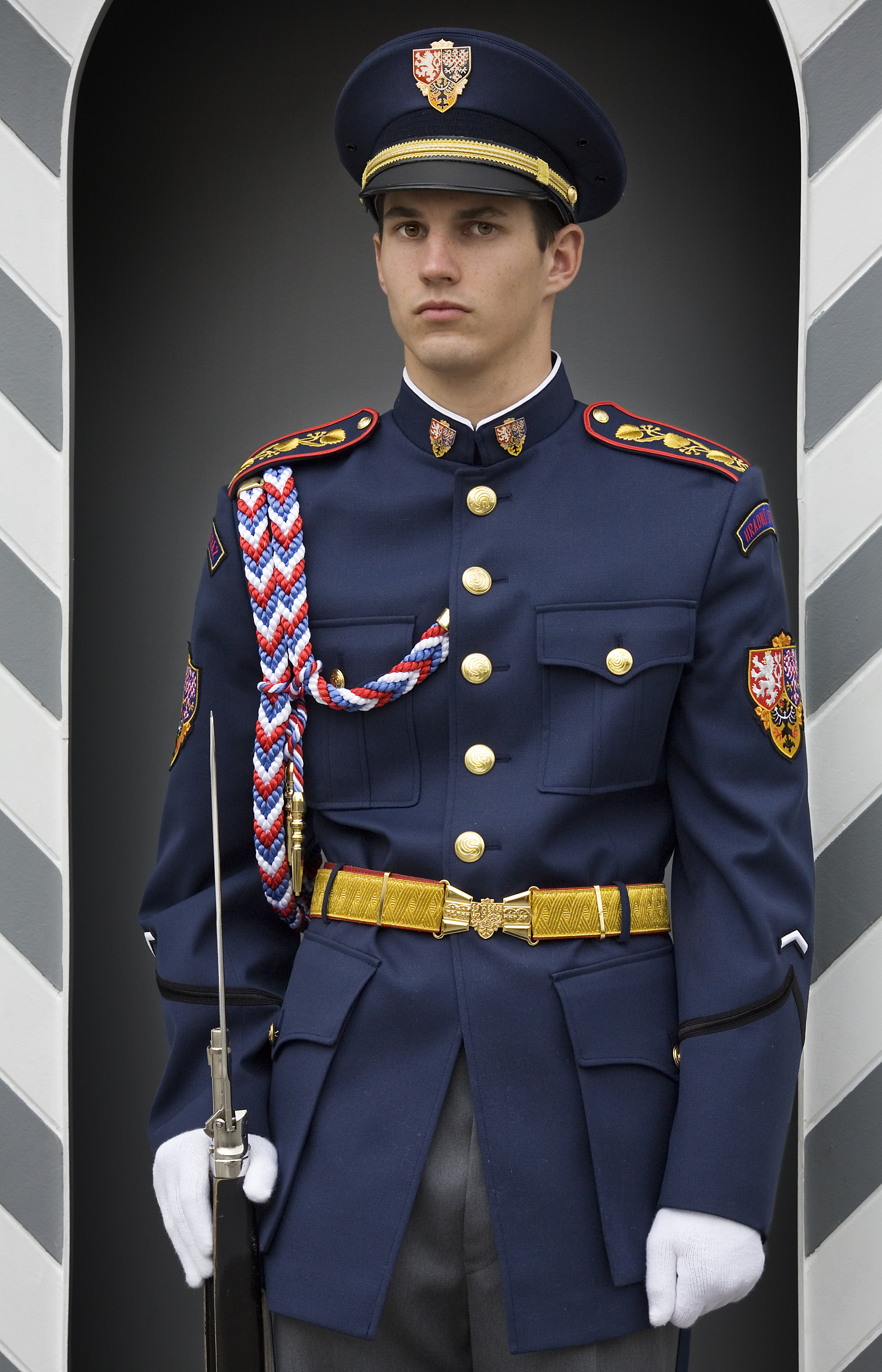
Winter uniform

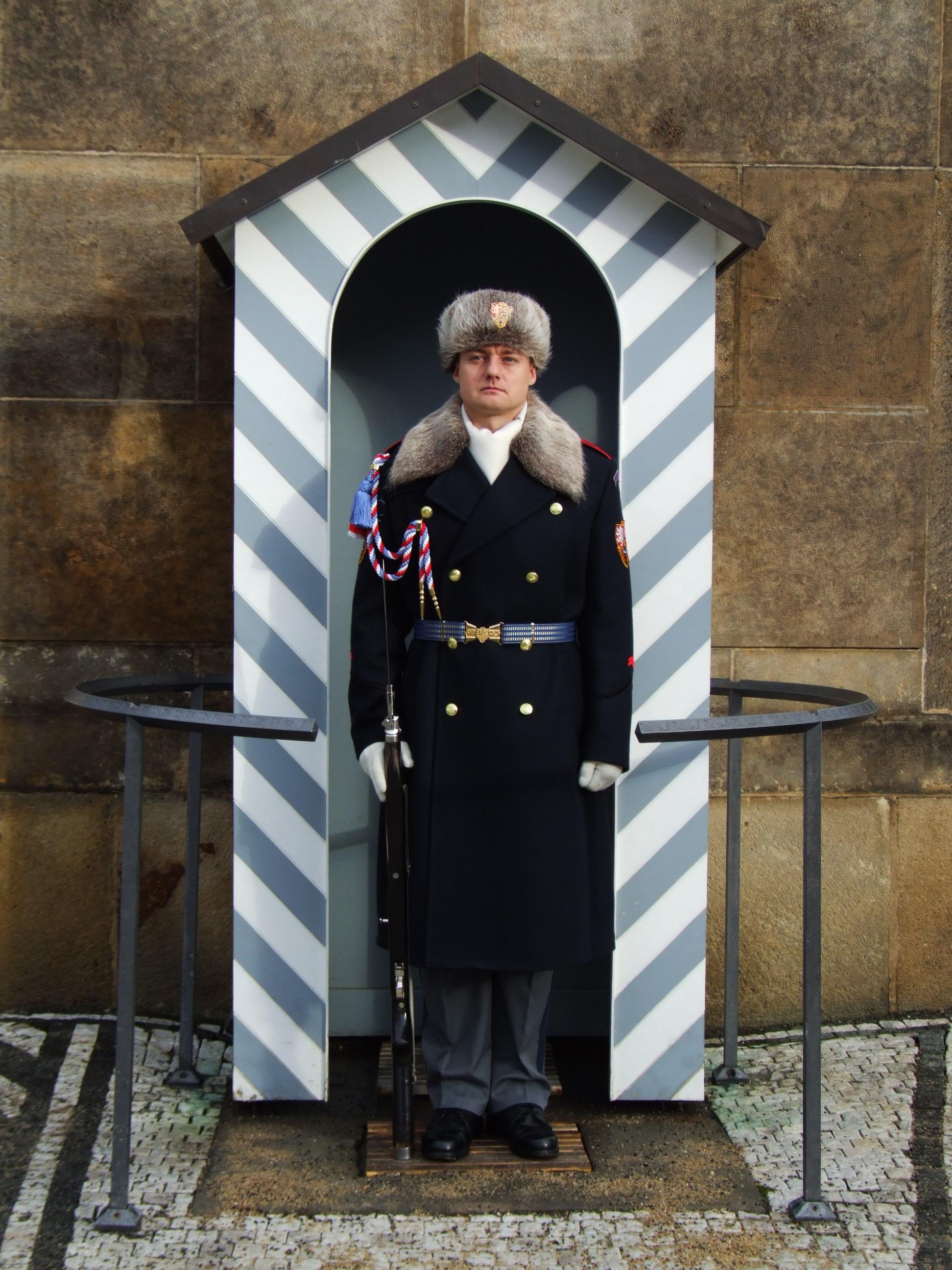
Winter uniform

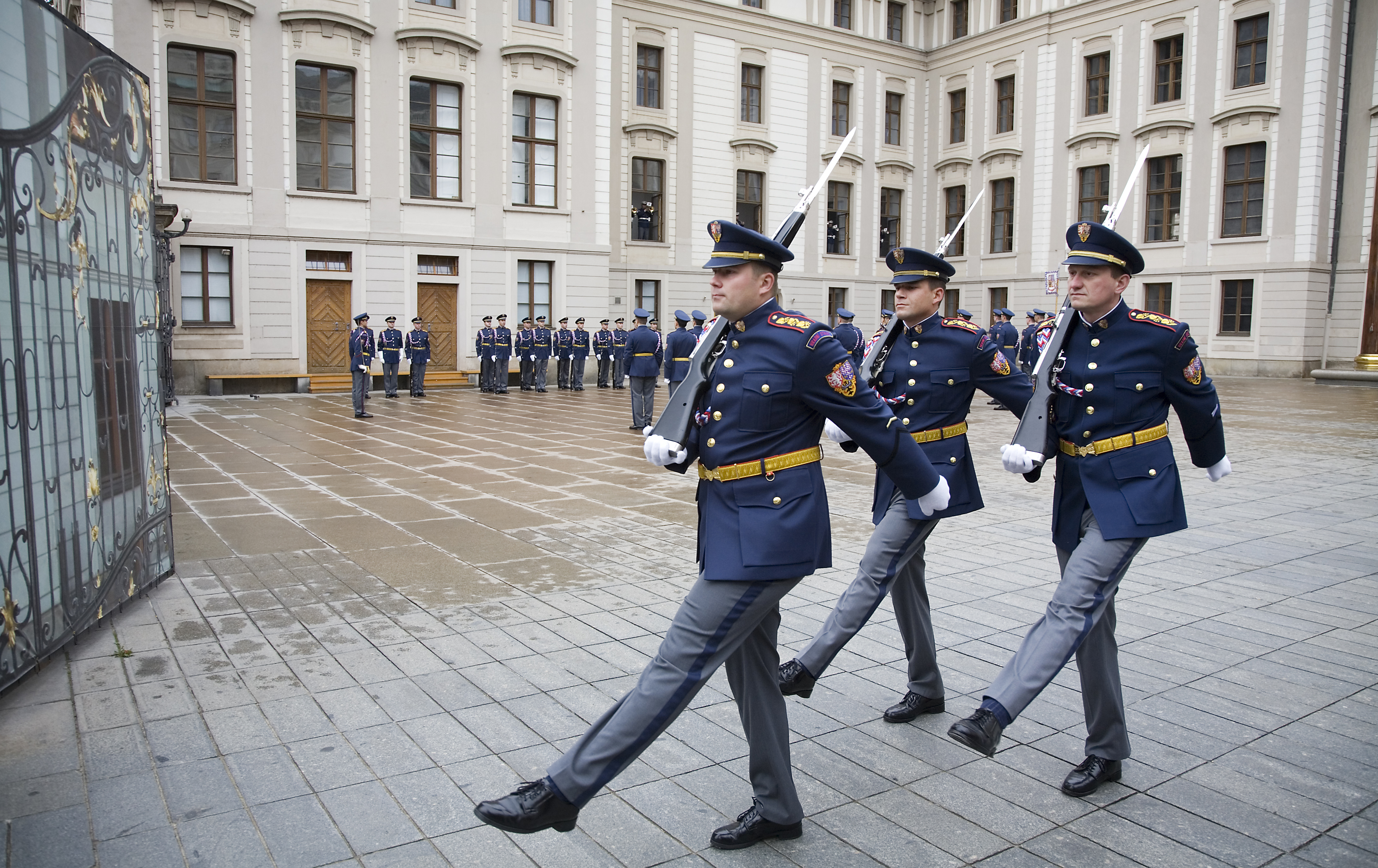
Changing of the guard

=== Standard duty ===
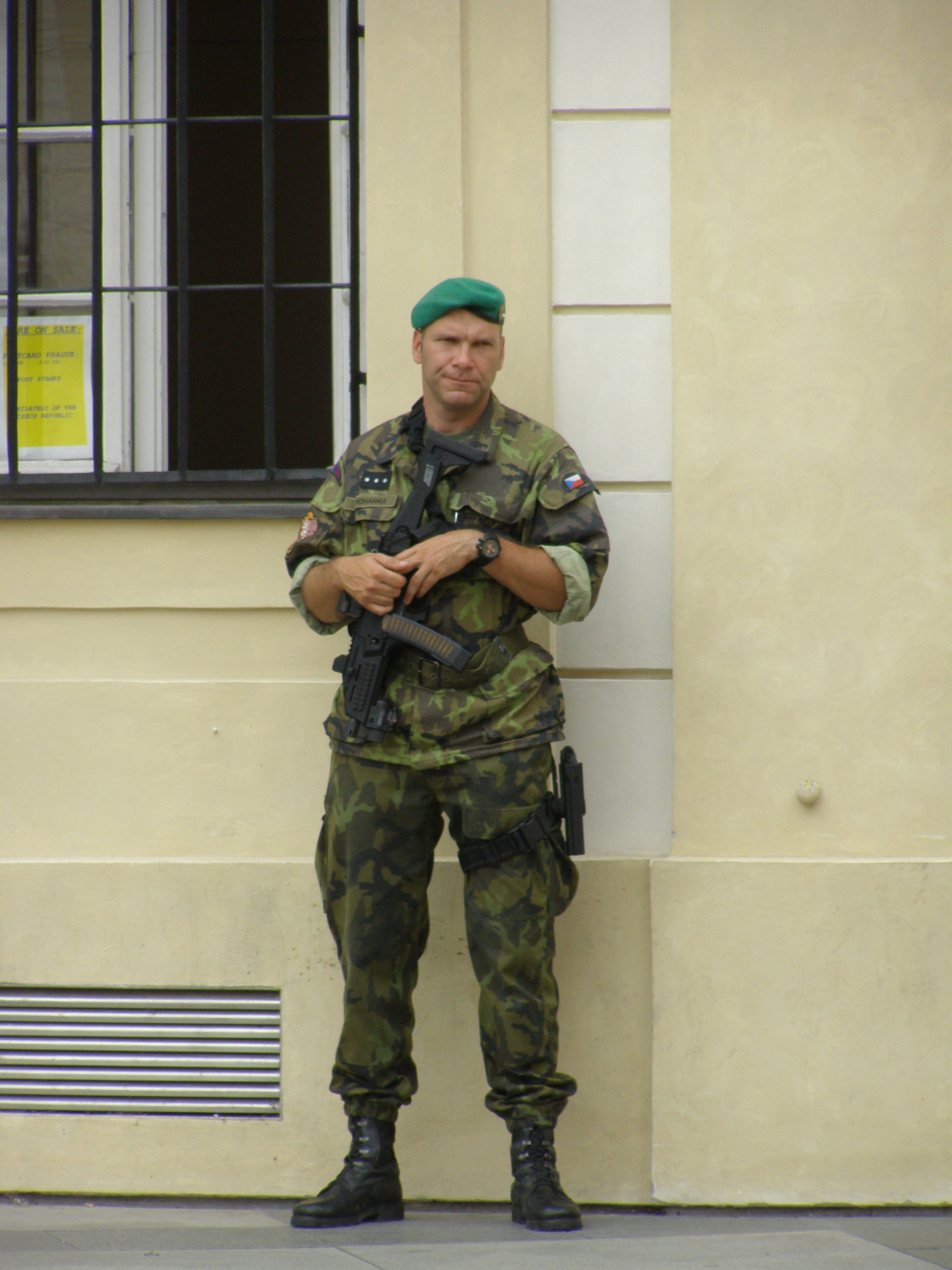
Standard uniform

== See also ==
- Band of the Castle Guards and the Police of the Czech Republic
