= Military Band Olomouc =

Musical unit of the Army of the Czech Republic

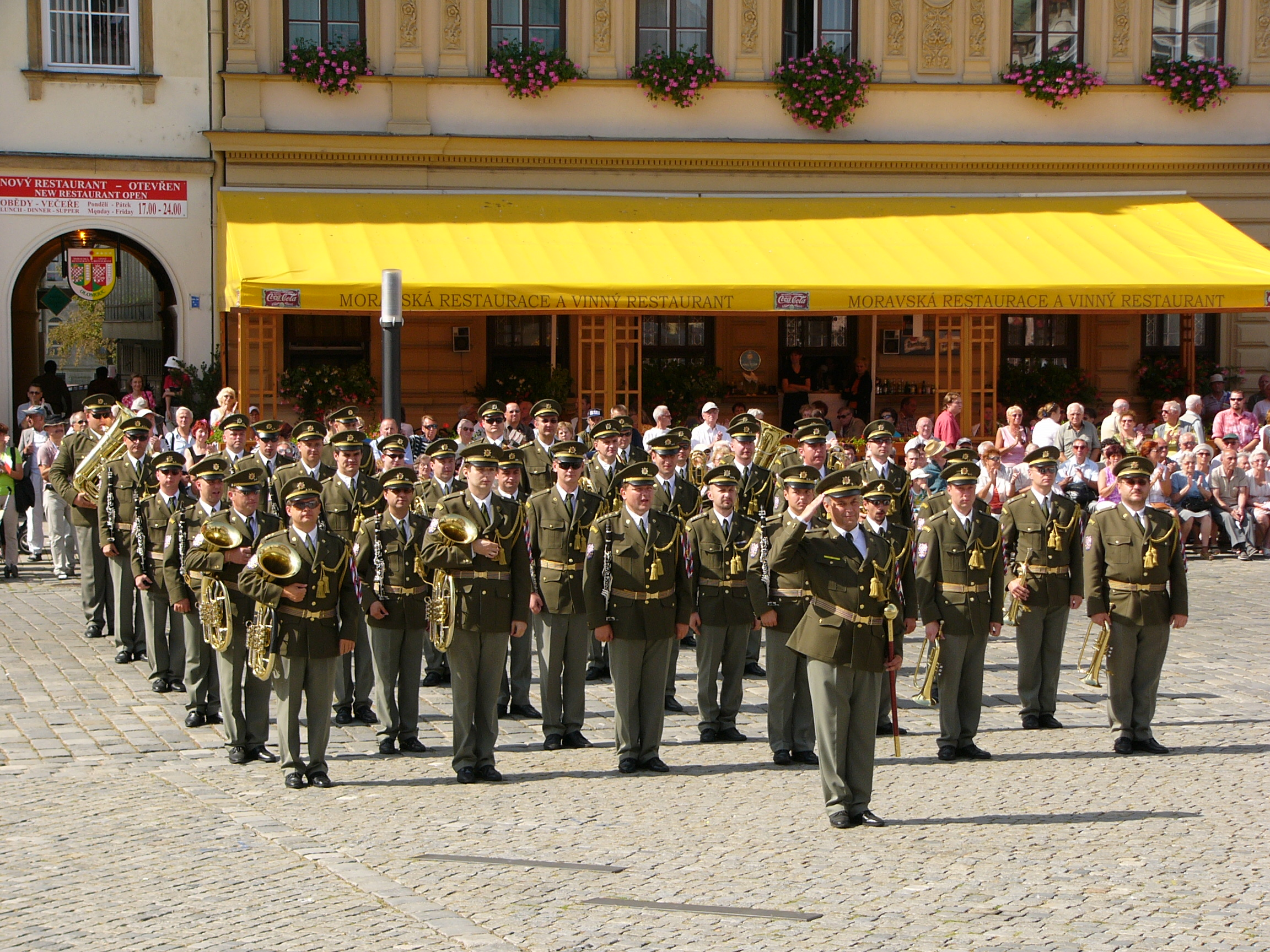
The band in 2005

Military Band Olomouc (Czech: Vojenská hudba Olomouc) is a musical unit of the Army of the Czech Republic based in the Moravian city of Olomouc, in the east of the Czech Republic. It is organizationally part of the Prague Garrison Command, which is the military area tasked public duties in Prague. It is currently led by the deputy head of the Music Service of CAF, Captain Richard Czuczor.

After the end of First World War in 1918, the Czechoslovak Ministry of Defense ordered the creation of a 43-member music band, which after a number of reorganizations over a number of years, began to serve as the band of the 4th Infantry Regiment in 1945. In December 1950, the Czechoslovak People's Army established its own Central Music Service with the band making up a large part. A substantial change took place in the structure in 1953, when the band was divided and part of the musicians went to Šumperk in the Olomouc Region to create a regional regimental band with 19 members. Being an official band that could perform at various military events, it spent most of the time in the Smilov Military Training Area in Libavá.

== Notable members ==
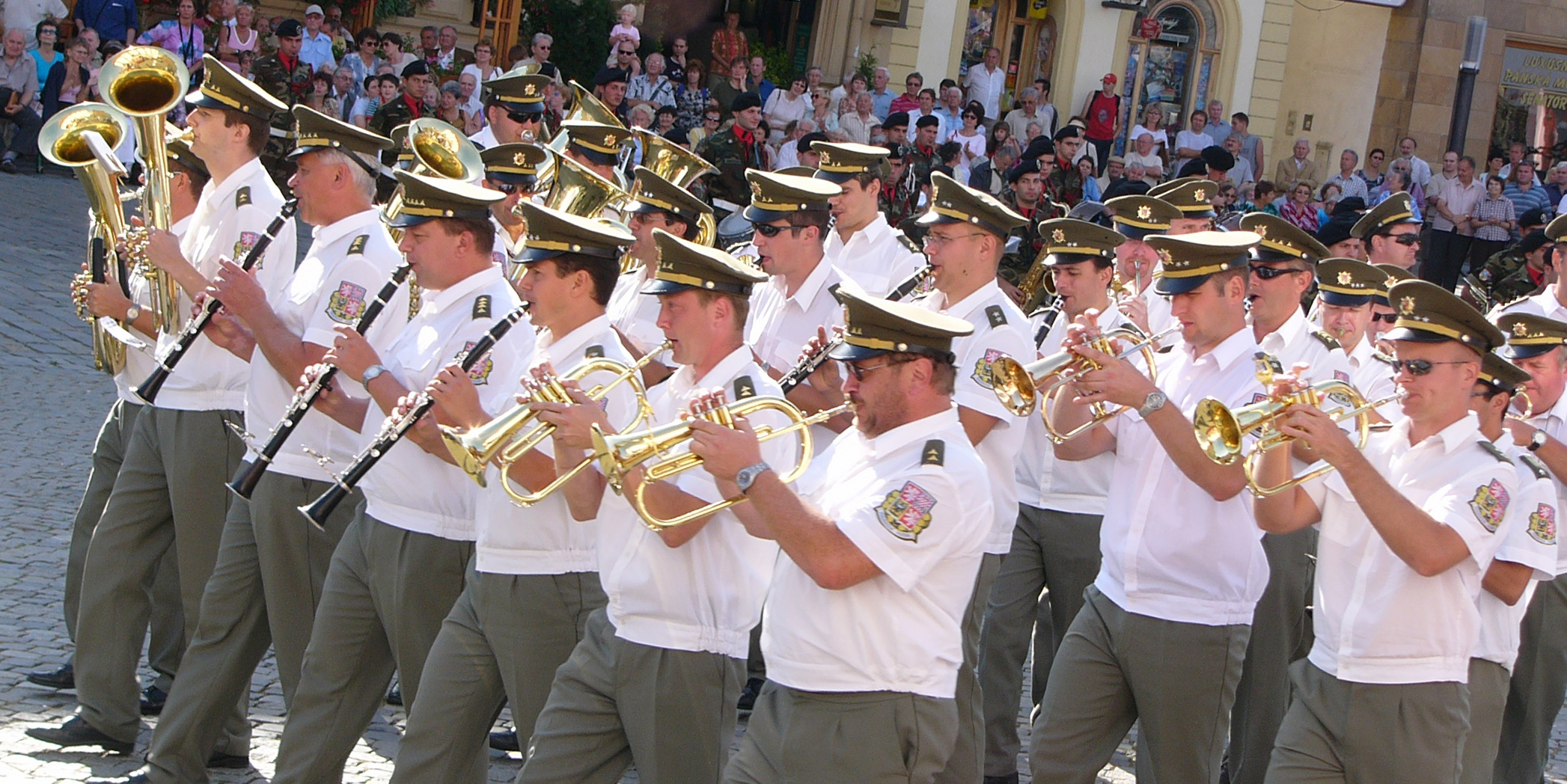
Members of the band in a summer uniform.

- Dr. Robert Šálek
- Karol Mikuláštík
- Adolf Hamerský
- Karel Pitra
- Jindřich Zbožínek
- Otto Vymětal
- Vladimír Peter
- Karel Bělohoubek
- Rudolf Blazek
- Josef Gedenk
- Josef Potuznik
- Josef Hasa
- Emanuel Kalab
