= Band of the Castle Guards and the Police of the Czech Republic =

Czech police band

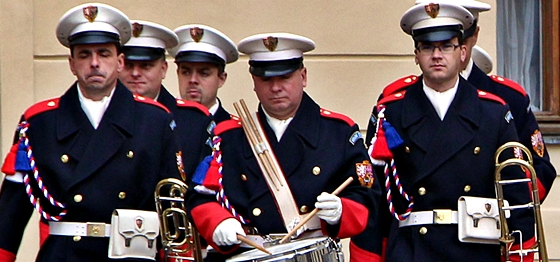
A small ensemble of the Band of the Castle Guards pictured during guard mounting at Prague Castle in November 2017.

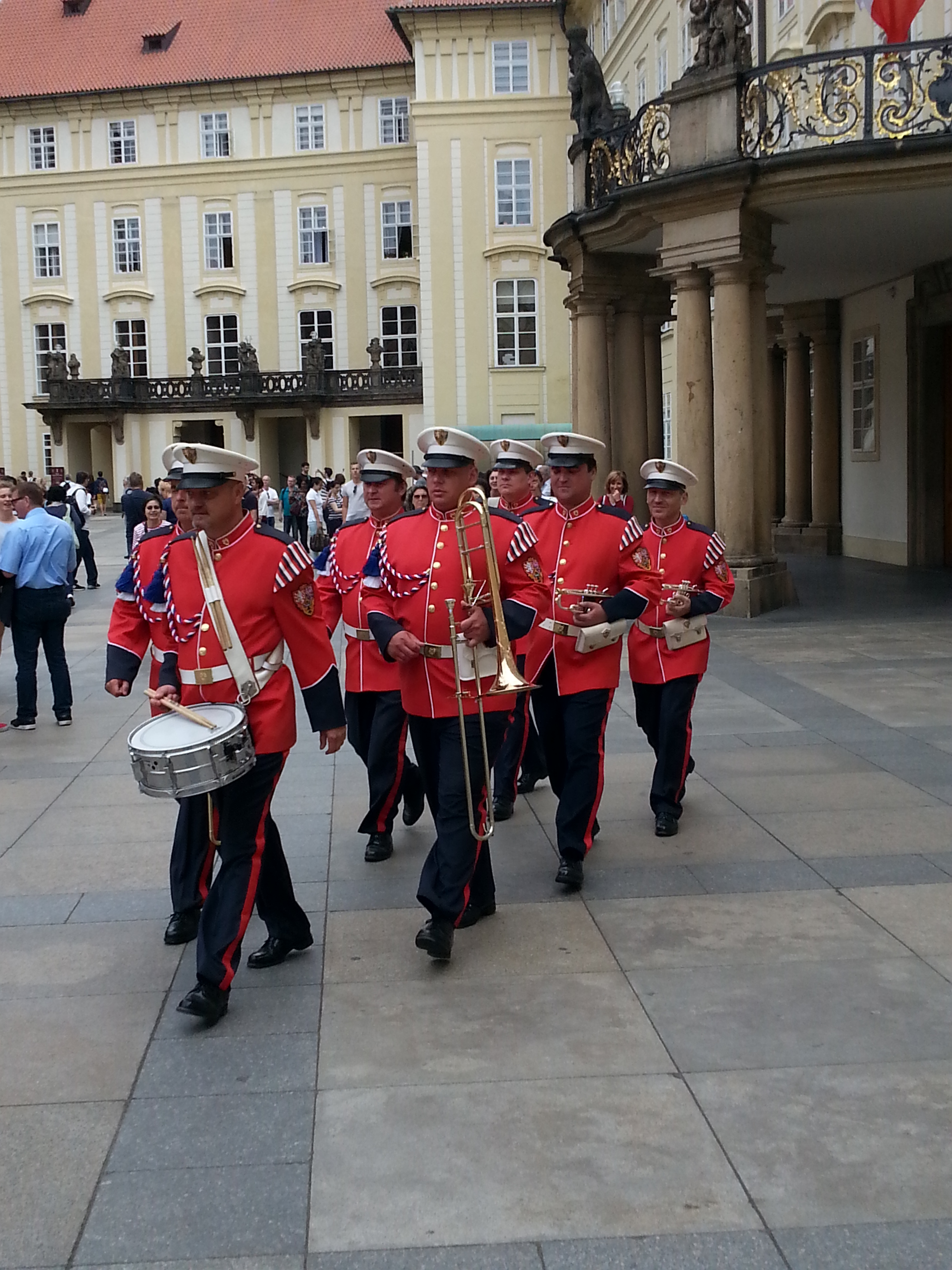
The band at Prague Castle in June 2015.

The Band of the Castle Guards and the Police of the Czech Republic (Czech: Hudba Hradní stráže a Policie České republiky) is a unit of the Police of the Czech Republic responsible for providing musical support to the Prague Castle Guard of the Army of the Czech Republic, as well as during other official ceremonies at Prague Castle such as state visits.

The band's origins date to 1945 and it was officially organized within the Ministry of the Interior of Czechoslovakia in 1953. In 1990 it assumed the name "Band of the Castle Guards and the Police".

== See also ==
- Law enforcement in the Czech Republic
- Police band
