= Czech Armed Forces =

Combined military forces of the Czech Republic

- Armáda České republiky
- Coat of Arms

- Roundel
- Founded: 30 June 1918 (108 years, 4 months)
- Current form: 1 January 1993 (33 years, 10 months)
- Service branches: Czech Land Forces; Czech Air Force; Czech Territorial Forces; Czech Information and Cyber Forces; Czech Special Forces
- Headquarters: Prague, Czech Republic
- Website: mo.gov.cz/en/

Leadership
- President: Army General (Retired) Petr Pavel
- Prime Minister: Andrej Babiš
- Minister of Defence: Jaromír Zůna
- Chief of the General Staff: Army general Miroslav Hlaváč

Personnel
- Military age: 18
- Conscription: Abolished in 2004
- Active personnel: 30,334 professional 4,900 active reserve 8,475 civilian employees
- Deployed personnel: 2,631 (in 2025) (Note: 2,000 NATO EFP (Estonia, Lithuania, Latvia, Poland, Slovakia, Hungary, Romania, Bulgaria) 40 NATO SATU 56 NATO DJC Module 95 NATO Icelandic Air Policing 30 NATO Mauritania 50 NATO KFOR 20 NATO OIR and NMI 200 EU Operation Althea 10 EU Operation Irini 100 EUMAM Ukraine (Separate from UA training within Czech Republic) 10 UNDOF 20 Ukraine (embassy protection))

Expenditure
- Budget: CZK160.8 billion US$6.5 billion (ranked 51st)
- Percent of GDP: 1,85% (2025)

Industry
- Domestic suppliers: Czechoslovak Group; STV Group; Colt CZ Group; Omnipol; Meopta; Zeveta Bojkovice; SVOS Přelouč; Explosia
- Foreign suppliers: See list: Austria; Germany; Israel; Italy; Poland; Spain; Sweden; United Kingdom; United States; Other (Note: In 2002, the Czech Republic accepted delivery of Russian helicopters, sniper rifles and other equipment as a set-off of Russian debts towards the Czech Republic.)

Related articles
- Ranks: Czech military ranks

The Czech Armed Forces (Czech: Armáda České republiky, lit. 'the Army of the Czech Republic'; abbreviated AČR), also known as the Czech Army, are the military responsible for the defence of the Czech Republic. The Czech Armed Forces led by the General Staff consist of the Land Forces, the Air Force, the Special Forces, the Information and Cyber Forces, the Territorial Forces, and other components.

Modern Czech military history started with formal establishment of the Czechoslovak Legion fighting on the side of the Entente powers during World War I, thus preceding the 1918 Czechoslovak declaration of independence. Following the Munich Agreement, the country was occupied by Nazi Germany and the Army was reconstituted in exile, fighting on the side of Allies of World War II in the European as well as Mediterranean and Middle East theatre. After the 1948 Communist Coup, the Czechoslovak People's Army with over 200,000 active personnel and some 4,500 tanks formed one of the pillars of the Warsaw Pact military alliance.

Following the Velvet Revolution and dissolution of Czechoslovakia, the Czech Republic joined NATO in 1999. The conscription was abolished in 2004, leading to transformation into a modern professional army inspired mostly by the British Armed Forces and USMC example. Today, the Czech Army has around 30.000 professional personnel and 4.900 members of active reserves. Additionally, any citizen can voluntarily join a five-week basic training without becoming a soldier or join advanced shooting training with their privately owned firearms and become a member of the militia-style Designated Reserves.

A law adopted in June 2023 stipulates that the military expenditures shall not be lower than 2% of country's GDP, starting from 2024. In March 2025, Petr Fiala Government adopted a decision to raise the military expenditures annually by 0,2% of GDP, in order to reach at least 3% of GDP in 2030. However the following Andrej Babiš Government decided not to raise military expenditures.

== History ==
=== Czech lands ===
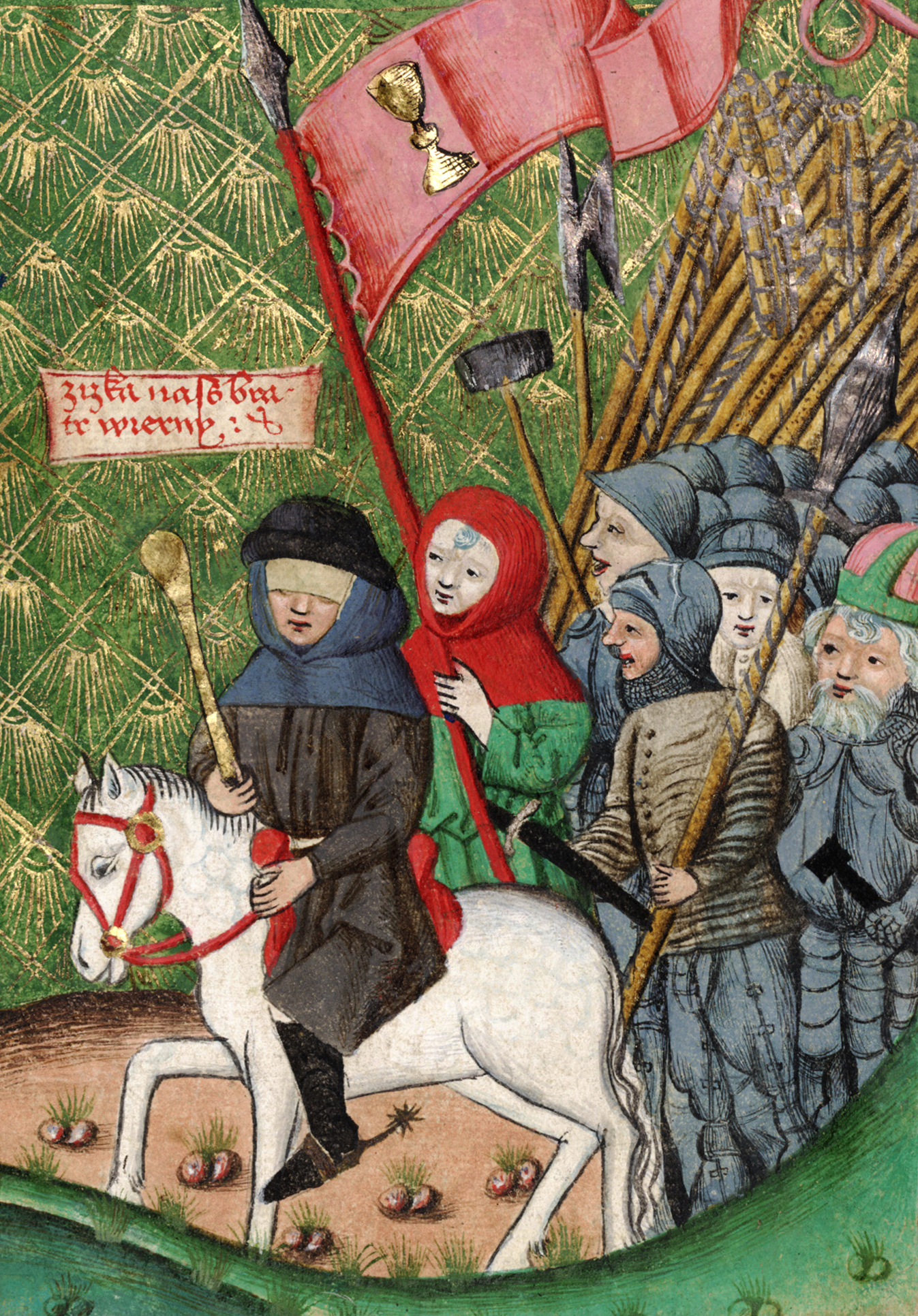
Hussite field army led by Jan Žižka; Jena Codex, 15th century

The military history of the Czech people dates back to the Middle Ages and the creation of the Duchy of Bohemia and the Kingdom of Bohemia. The battle on the Marchfeld was one of the largest medieval cavalry battles in Central Europe, in which the Iron and Golden King Ottokar II of Bohemia was killed.

During the Hussite Wars, Jan Žižka became a military leader of such skill and eminence that the Hussite legacy became an important and lasting part of the Czech military traditions.

Notable military figures of Czech nobility in the Habsburg monarchy include Albrecht von Wallenstein and Joseph Radetzky von Radetz.

When the World War I broke out, the Czech Crown lands were part of the Austria-Hungary and the colonised Czech population had to serve in its army. From 1914, on the background of attempts to attain independence, various units composed of Czech nationals (with up to 10% of Slovak nationals), mainly POWs, were established, fighting as part of the French, Italian and Russian forces against the Entente powers. Beginning in 1916, these Czechoslovak Legions gained increasingly independent status. Following the 1918 Czechoslovak declaration of independence, the newly established Czechoslovak Army derived its legacy primarily from these legions rather than from the Austrian Habsburg Imperial Army.

Official military names since 1918:

- 1918–1950 - Czechoslovak Armed Forces (this official name was given to the Czechoslovak Army on March 19, 1920, on the basis of the Armed Forces Act)
- 1950–1954 - Czechoslovak Army
- 1954–1989 - Czechoslovak People's Army
- 1990–1992 - Czechoslovak Army
- since 1993 - Army of the Czech Republic (ACR)

=== Czechoslovakia ===
The Czechoslovak Armed Forces were originally formed on 30 June 1918 when 6,000 members of the Czechoslovak Legion in France, which had been established in 1914, took oath and received a battle banner in Darney, France, thus preceding the official declaration of Czechoslovak independence by four months. There were also 50 000 legion soldiers in Russia at that time. The military achievements of the Czechoslovak legions on the French, Italian and especially Russian front became one of the main arguments that the Czechoslovak pro-independence leaders, especially for T. G. Masaryk in America, could use to gain the support for the country's independence by the Allies of World War I.

In 1938, servicemen of the Czechoslovak Army and the State Defense Guard fought in an undeclared border war against the German-backed Sudetendeutsches Freikorps as well as Polish and Hungarian paramilitary forces. As a result of the Munich Agreement, areas heavily populated by ethnic German speaking people were incorporated into the Third Reich and military-aged men living there were subject to being drafted into the Wehrmacht. In 1939, after the Slovak State proclaimed its independence and the remainder of Carpathian Ruthenia was occupied and annexed by Hungary, the German occupation of the Czech Lands followed and the Protectorate of Bohemia and Moravia was proclaimed after the negotiations with Emil Hácha. The Protectorate's government possessed its own armed force, the Government Army (6,500 men), tasked with public security and rearguard duties. On the other side of the conflict, a number of Czechoslovak units and formations served with the Polish Army (Czechoslovak Legion), the French Army, the Royal Air Force, the British Army (the 1st Czechoslovak Armoured Brigade), and the Red Army (I Corps). Four Czech and Slovak-manned RAF squadrons were transferred to Czechoslovak control in late 1945.

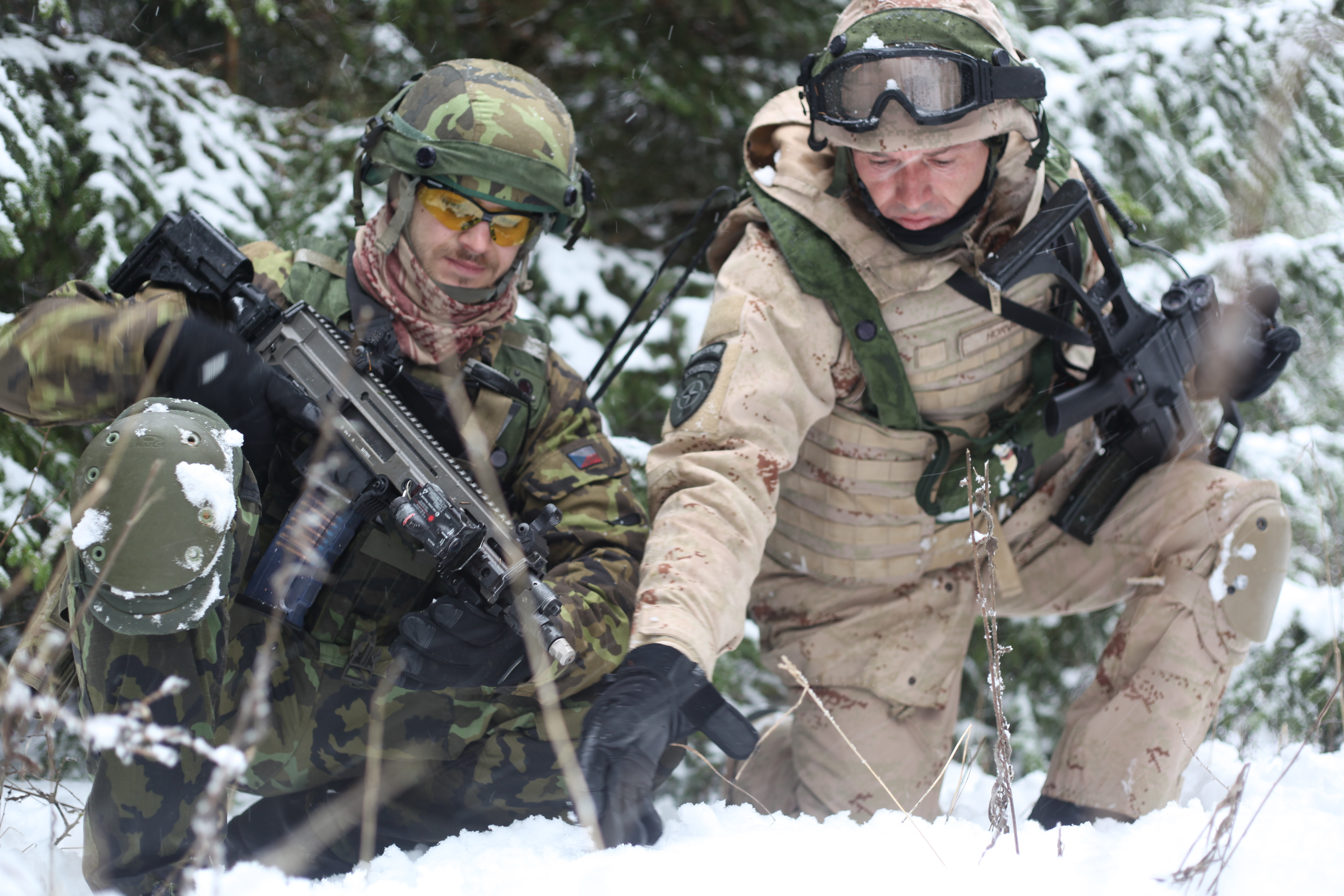
Croatian Army soldier discusses patrol routes with a Czech Army soldier (left)

From 1954 until 1989, the Army was known as the Czechoslovak People's Army (ČSLA). Although the ČSLA, as formed in 1945, included both Soviet- and British-equipped/trained expatriate troops, the "Western" soldiers had been purged from the ČSLA after 1948 when the communists took power. The ČSLA offered no resistance to the invasion mounted by the Soviets in 1968 in reaction to the "Prague Spring", and was extensively reorganized by the Soviets following the re-imposition of communist rule in Prague.

Of the approximately 201,000 personnel on active duty in the ČSLA in 1987, about 145,000, or about 72 percent, served in the ground forces (commonly referred to as the army). About 100,000 of these were conscripts. There were two military districts, Western and Eastern. A 1989 listing of forces shows two Czechoslovak armies in the west, the 1st Army at Příbram with one tank division and three motor rifle divisions, the 4th Army at Písek with two tank divisions and two motor rifle divisions. In the Eastern Military District, there were two tank divisions, the 13th and 14th, with a supervisory headquarters at Trenčín in the Slovak part of the country.

During the Cold War, the ČSLA was equipped primarily with Soviet arms, although certain arms like the OT-64 SKOT armored personnel carrier, the L-29 Delfín and L-39 Albatros aircraft, the P-27 Pancéřovka antitank rocket launcher, the vz. 58 assault rifle or the Uk vz. 59 machine gun were of Czechoslovak design.

After the fall of communism during the Velvet Revolution in 1989, the Czechoslovak People's Army was renamed back to the Czechoslovak Army and was completely transformed as well.

=== After 1992 (dissolution of Czechoslovakia) ===
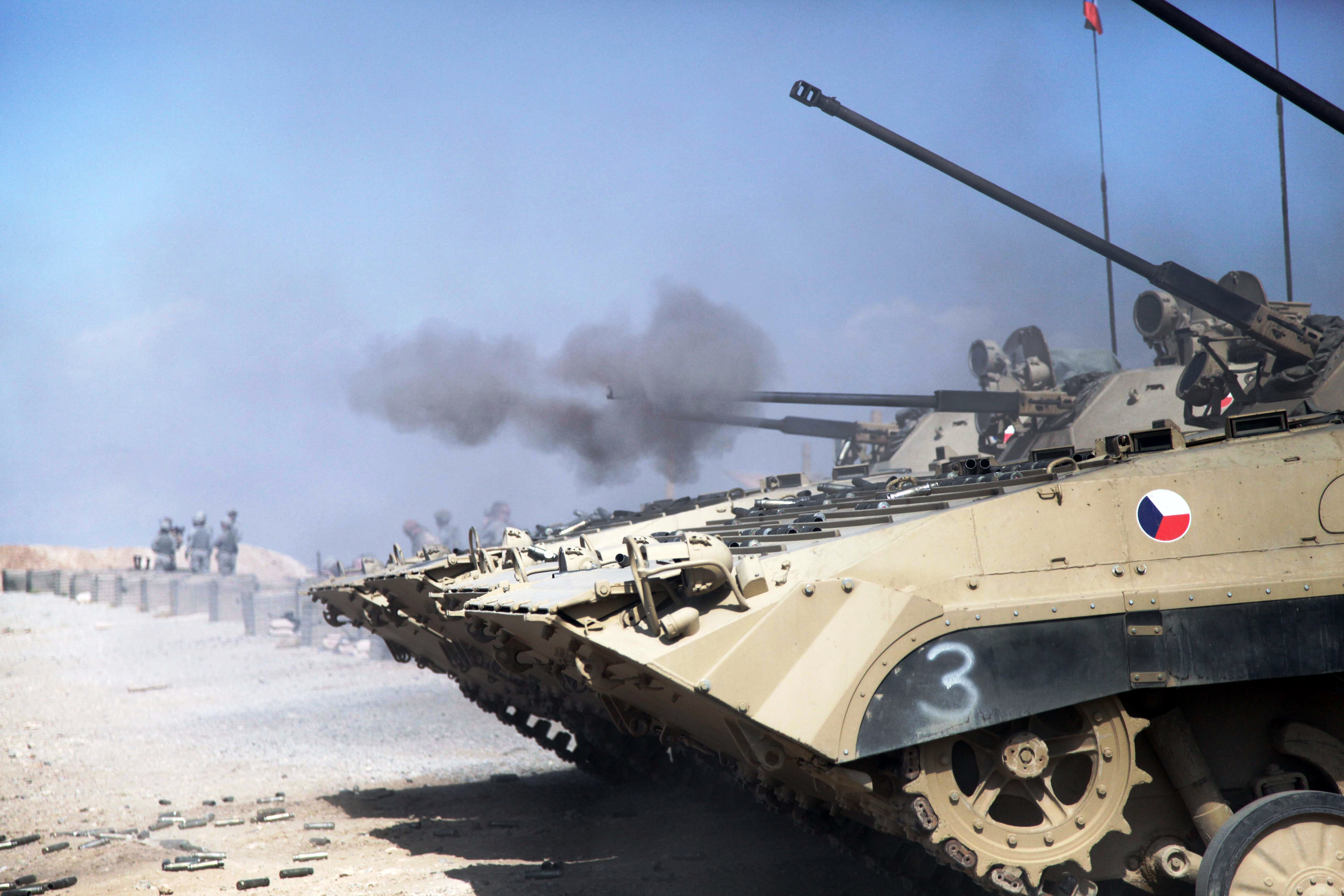
Czech BVP-2 firing in Afghanistan

Czech Army Soldiers to participate in exercise Combined Resolve at the Joint Multinational Readiness Center in Hohenfels, Germany

The Army of the Czech Republic was formed after the Czechoslovak Armed Forces split after the 31 December 1992 peaceful dissolution of Czechoslovakia. Czech forces stood at 90,000 in 1993. They were reduced to around 65,000 in 11 combat brigades and the Air Force in 1997, to 63,601 in 1999, and to 35,000 in 2005. At the same time, the forces were modernized and reoriented towards a defensive posture. In 2004, the army transformed itself into a fully professional organization and compulsory military service was abolished. The Army maintains an active reserve.

The Czech Republic is a member of the United Nations and the Organization for Security and Co-operation in Europe. In March 1999, the Czech Republic joined NATO. Since 1990, the ACR and the Czech Armed Forces have contributed to numerous peacekeeping and humanitarian operations, including IFOR, SFOR, and EUFOR Althea in Bosnia, Desert Shield/Desert Storm, Afghanistan, Kosovo, Albania, Turkey, Pakistan and with the Coalition forces in Iraq.

Current deployments (2019):

- Lithuania: NATO Operation (NATO Enhanced Forward Presence) - 230 soldiers
- Latvia: NATO Operation (NATO Enhanced Forward Presence) - 60 soldiers
- Afghanistan: NATO Operation (Resolute Support Mission) - 390 soldiers
- Estonia, Latvia and Lithuania: NATO Operation (Baltic Air Policing) - 95 soldiers, 5x Jas 39 Gripen
- Kosovo: NATO Operation (KFOR) - 9 soldiers
- Mali: EU military training mission (EUTM Mali) - 120 soldiers
- Mali: UN peacekeeping mission (MINUSMA) - 5 soldiers
- Somalia: EU Operation Atalanta (NAVFOR) - 3 soldiers
- Sinai: International peacekeeping force (MFO) - 18 soldiers
- Iraq: Military intervention against the Islamic State (OIR) - 31 soldiers (air advisory team), 12 soldiers (chemical unit)
- Mediterranean Sea: EU military operation (EU Navfor Med) - 5 soldiers
- Bosnia and Herzegovina: Military deployment to oversee the military implementation of the Dayton Agreement (European Union Force Althea) - 2 soldiers
- Golan Heights: UN peacekeeping mission (UNDOF) - 3 soldiers
- DR Congo: UN peacekeeping mission (MONUC) - 2 military observers
- Mali: UN peacekeeping mission (MINUSMA) - 2 military observers
- Kosovo: UN peacekeeping mission (UNMIK) - 2 military observers
- Central African Republic: UN peacekeeping mission (MINUSCA) - 3 military observers

== Organization ==
Czech military terminology and the Act No. 219/1999 define the Czech Armed Forces (Czech: Armáda České republiky) as the main part of the Armed Forces of the Czech Republic (Czech: ozbrojené síly České republiky). Other components are the Military Office of the President of the Czech Republic and the Castle Guard.

Czech soldiers also serve in Ministry of Defence, military schools, Military Police and Military Intelligence.

Czech military organization
| Organization (in Czech) | ozbrojené síly České republiky | Armáda České republiky |
| Organization (in English) | Armed Forces of the Czech Republic | Czech Armed Forces, lit. Army of the Czech Republic (Czech Army) |
| Components | Czech Armed Forces (Czech Army); Castle Guard; Military Office of the President | Land Forces; Air Force; Territorial Forces; Information and Cyber Forces; Special Forces |

=== Supreme commander ===
The current supreme commander of the Armed Forces of the Czech Republic is President of the Republic Petr Pavel.

Many of the duties of the President of the Czech Republic can be said to be ceremonial to one degree or another, especially since the President has relatively few powers independent of the will of the Prime Minister. One of those is the status as commander in chief of the military; no part of these duties can take place but through the assent of the Prime Minister. In matters of war, he is in every sense merely a figurehead, since the Constitution gives all substantive constitutional authority over the use of the armed forces to the Parliament. In fact, the only specific thing the constitution allows the President to do with respect to the military is to appoint its generals – but even this must be done with the signature of the Prime Minister.

Czech Army - combat brigade/regiment locations

=== Organizational structure ===
Objective force structure according to the Czech Armed Forces Development Concept 2035:

- Chief of the General Staff of the Czech Armed Forces
  - General Staff of Czech Armed Forces (Prague)
    - Personnel Agency
    - Financial Administration
    - Communication and Information Systems Agency
    - Logistics Agency
    - Military Medicine Agency
  - Joint Operations Command (Prague)
  - Land Forces Command (Olomouc)
  - Air Force Command (Prague)
  - Territorial Forces Command (Tábor)
  - Information and Cyber Forces Command (Brno)
  - Special Forces Directorate (Prague)
  - Training Command - Military Academy (Vyškov)

=== Czech Armed Forces organization graphic ===
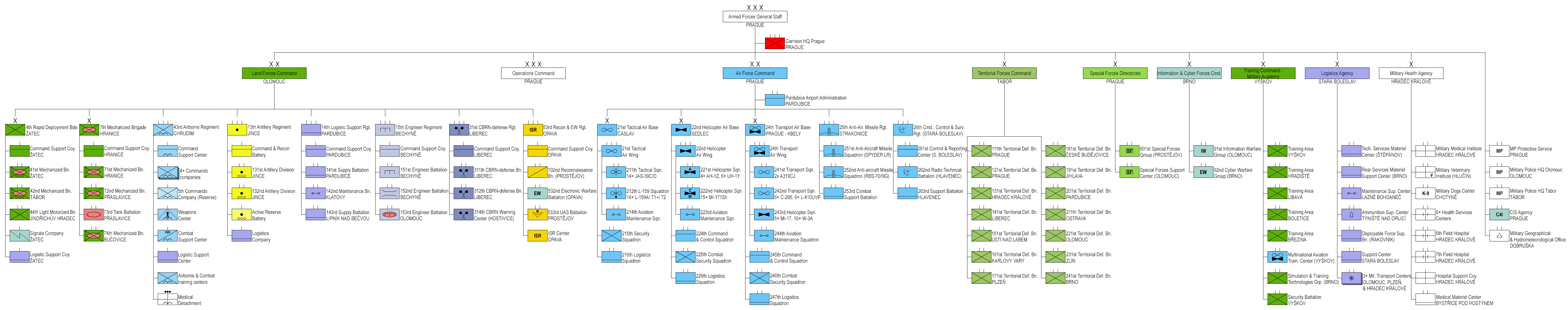
Czech Armed Forces organization as of April 2026 (click image to enlarge)

== Active Reserve Component ==
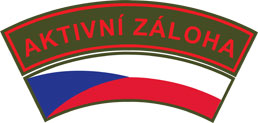
Active Reserve logo since 2016

Active Reserve (in Czech Aktivní záloha) is a part of the otherwise professional Armed Forces of the Czech Republic. This service was created to allow the participation of citizens with a positive attitude to the military.

A volunteer needs either to have completed the compulsory military service (which ended in 2004) or to attend 6 week training. Then the reservists serve from three weeks up to twelve weeks (in case of officers) a year. They can be also called up to serve for two weeks during a non-military crisis, such as floods. Individuals may volunteer to do serve as part of Czech Army missions abroad.

Each of the active duty brigades or regiments have their own active reserve subordinate units that train with the same equipment as the professional soldiers and is part of the organisational structure usually as a 4th company in a battalion. The Territorial Command is responsible for the active reserves and have direct control of the 14 infantry companies that belong to regional military commands in each of the 13 regions and capital city Prague.

== Equipment ==
Beginning 2020s, the Army is undergoing a major rearming effort, moving from its legacy ex-Warszaw pact equipment towards NATO-standard weaponry. By 2025, the modernization has been largely accomplished as far as individual equipment and weapons are concerned, while replacing of heavy equipment is still under way.

Standard issue arms
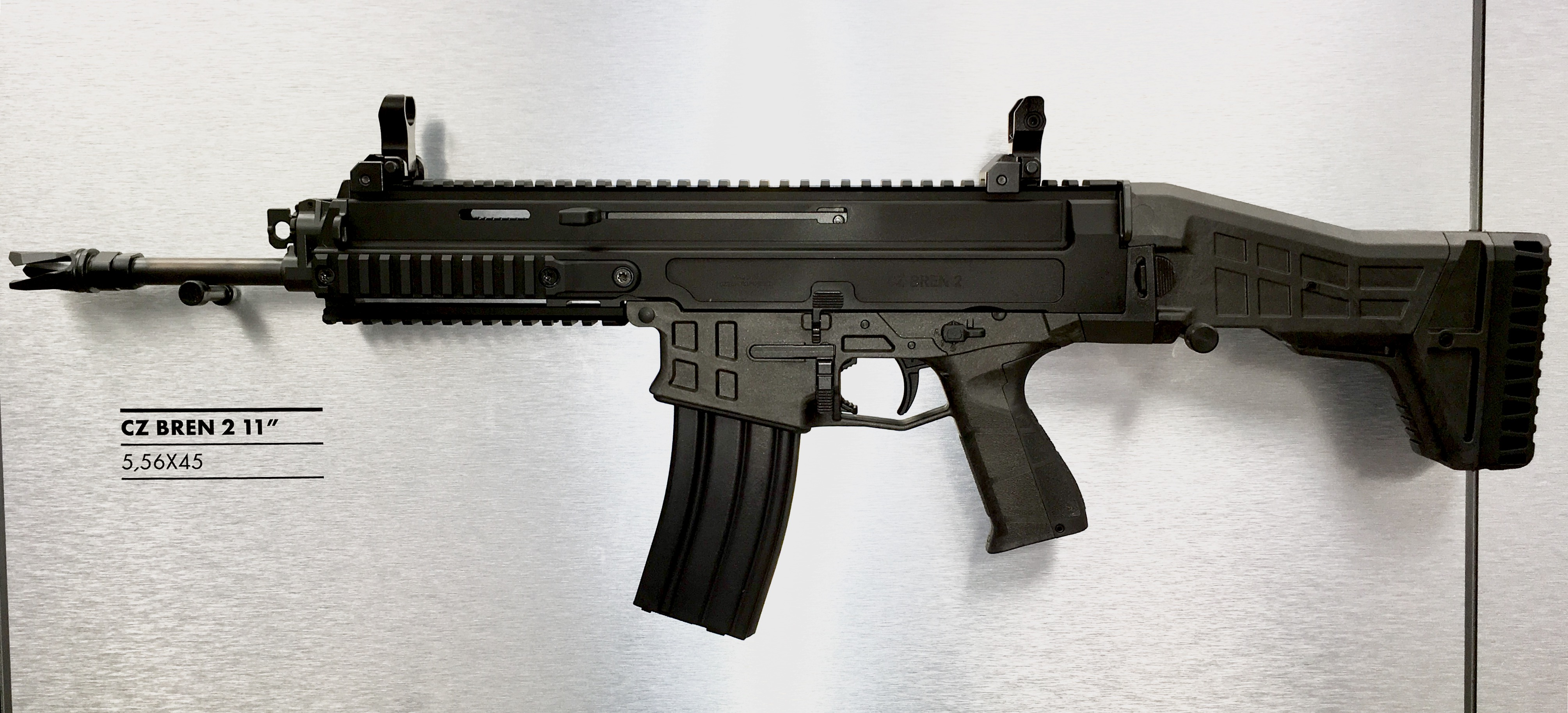
Carbine CZ BREN 2 (5.56 NATO)

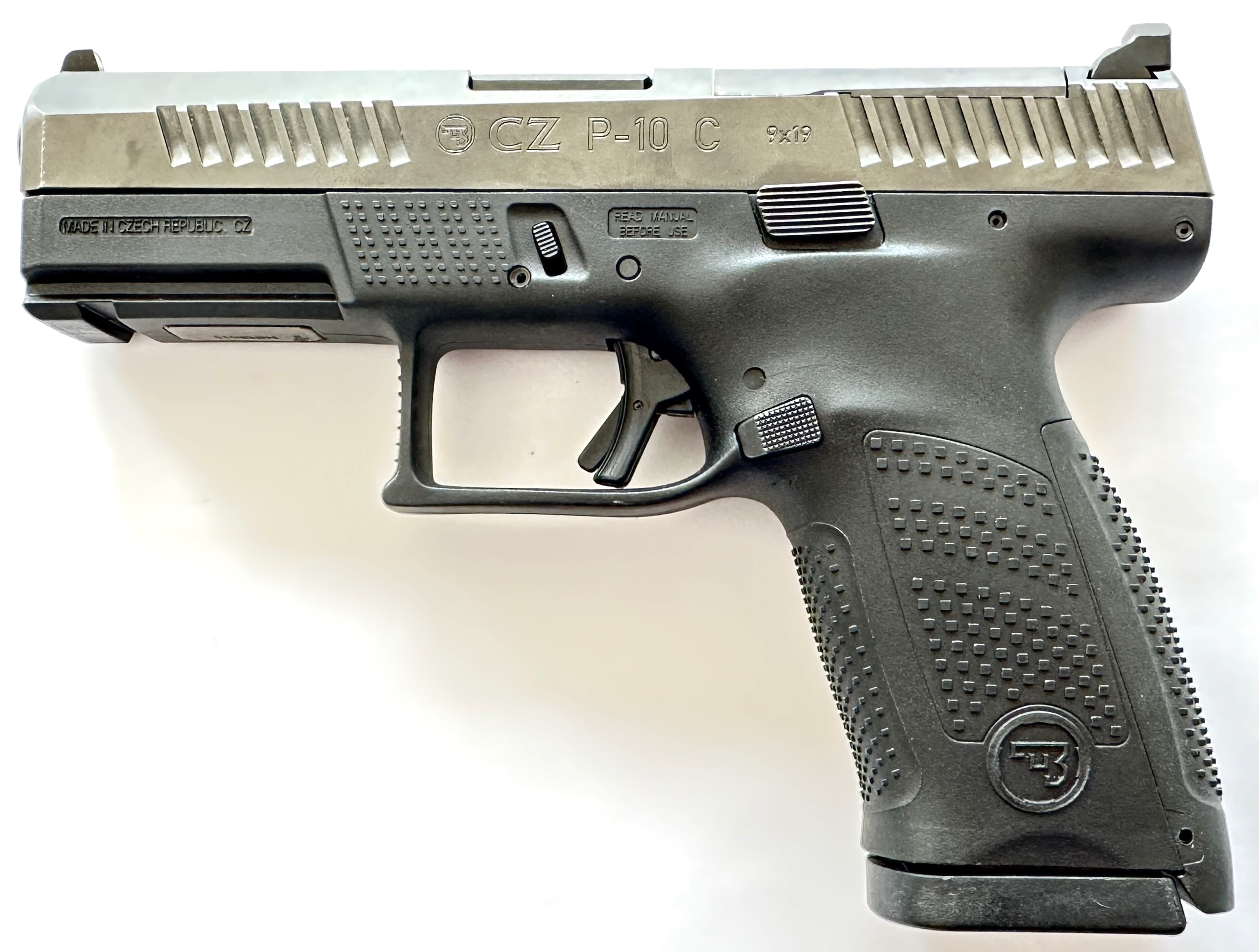
Pistol CZ P-10 C/F (9mm Luger)

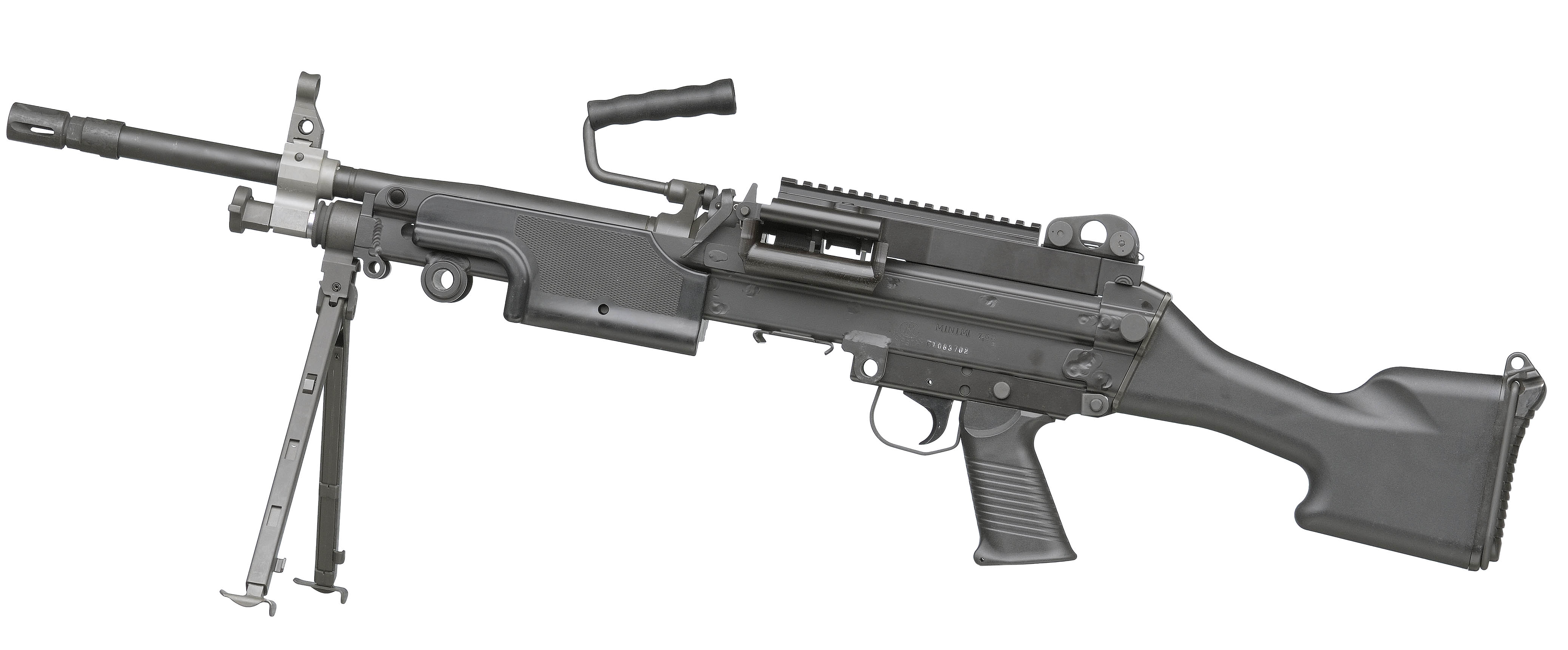
Machine-gun FN Minimi (7.62×51mm NATO)

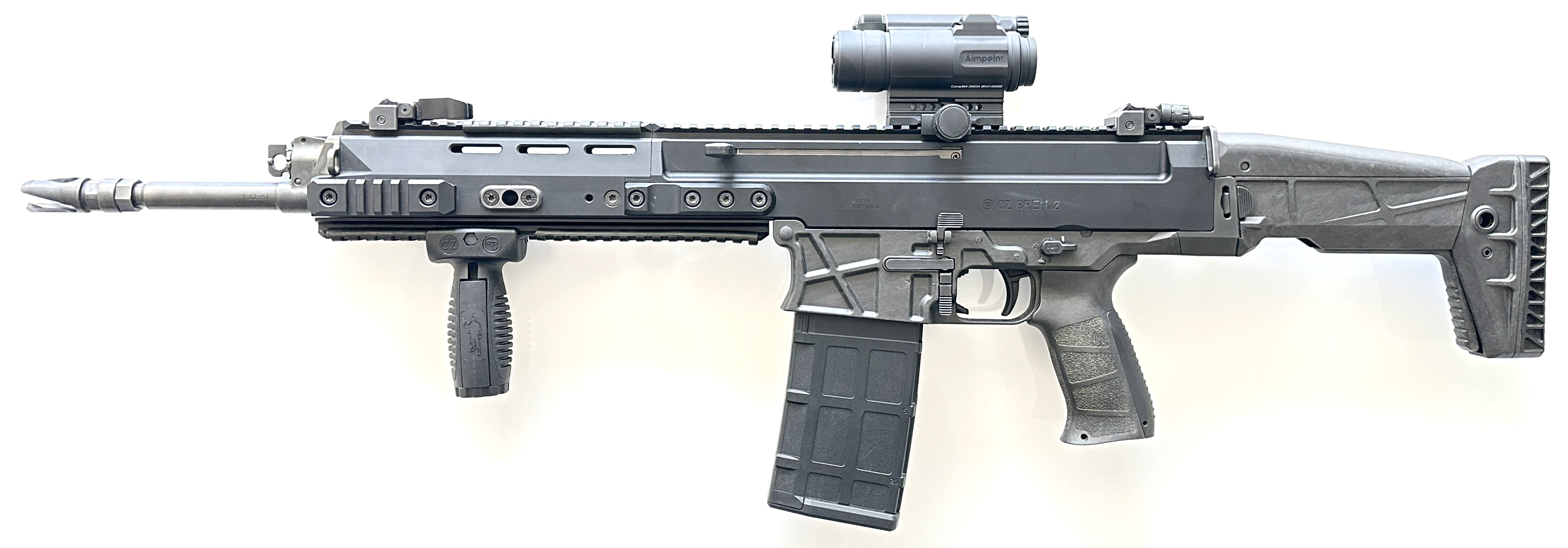
Designated marksman rifle CZ BREN 2 PPS (7.62×51mm NATO)

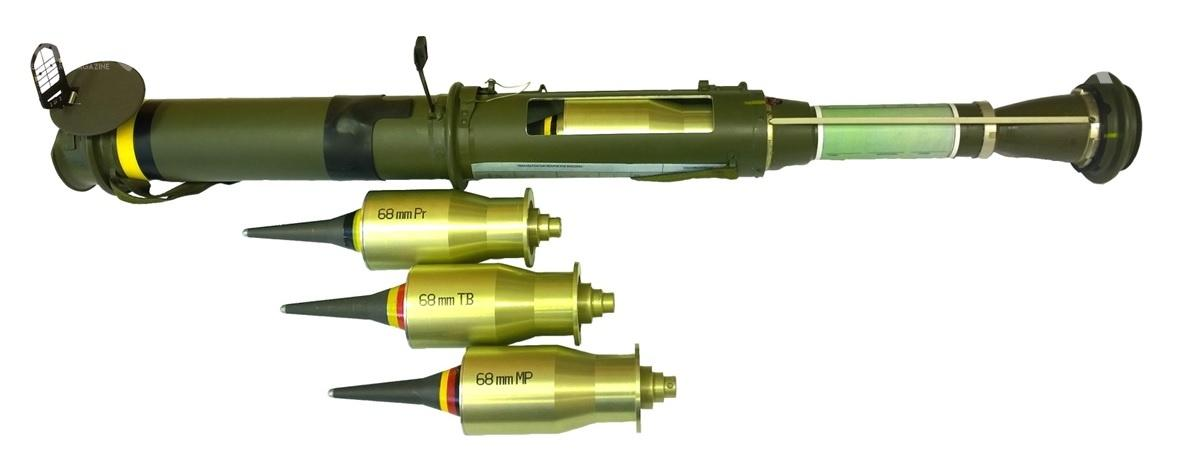
Recoilless gun RPG-75 (68mm)

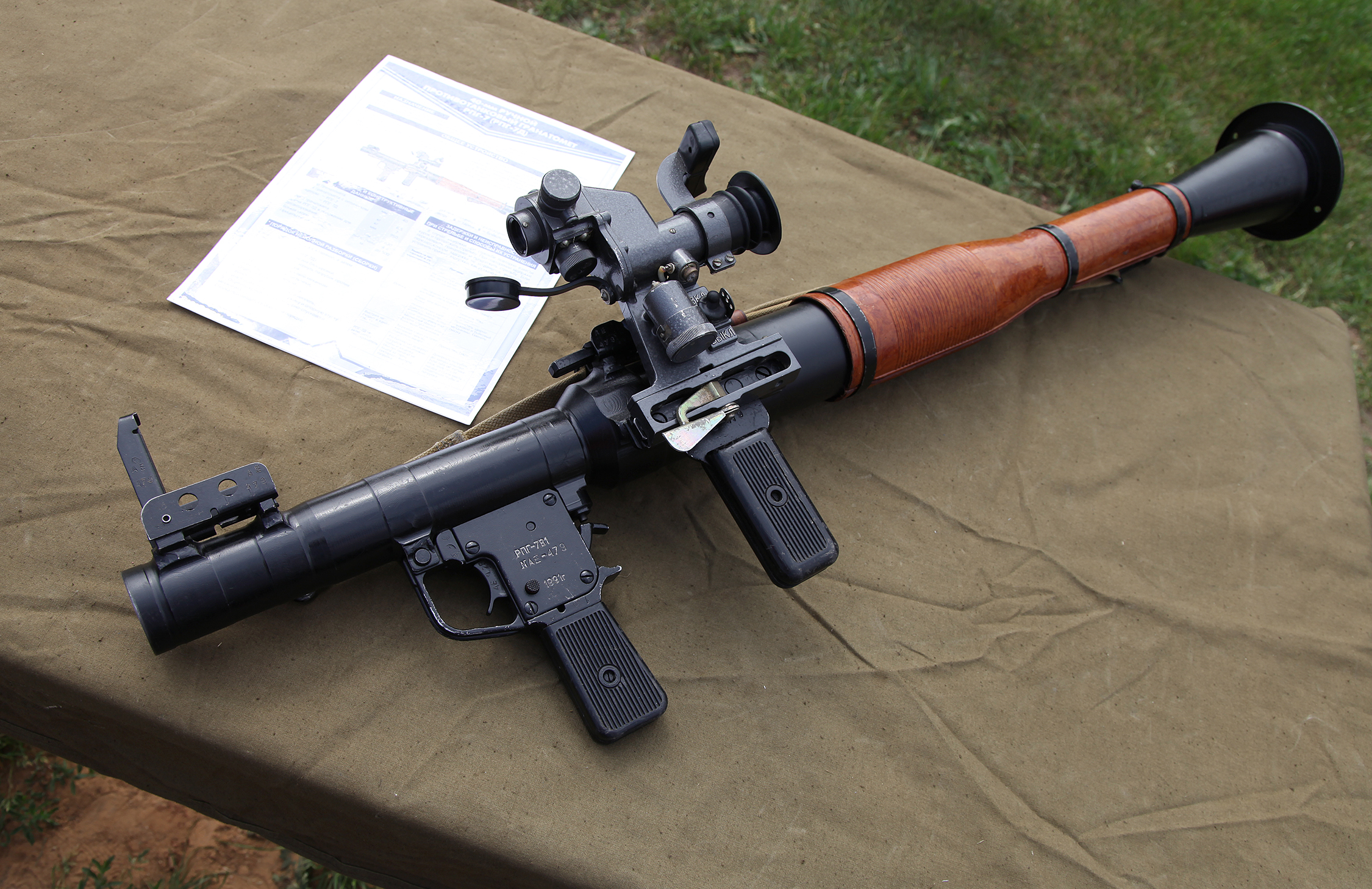
RPG-7V
Heavy equipment
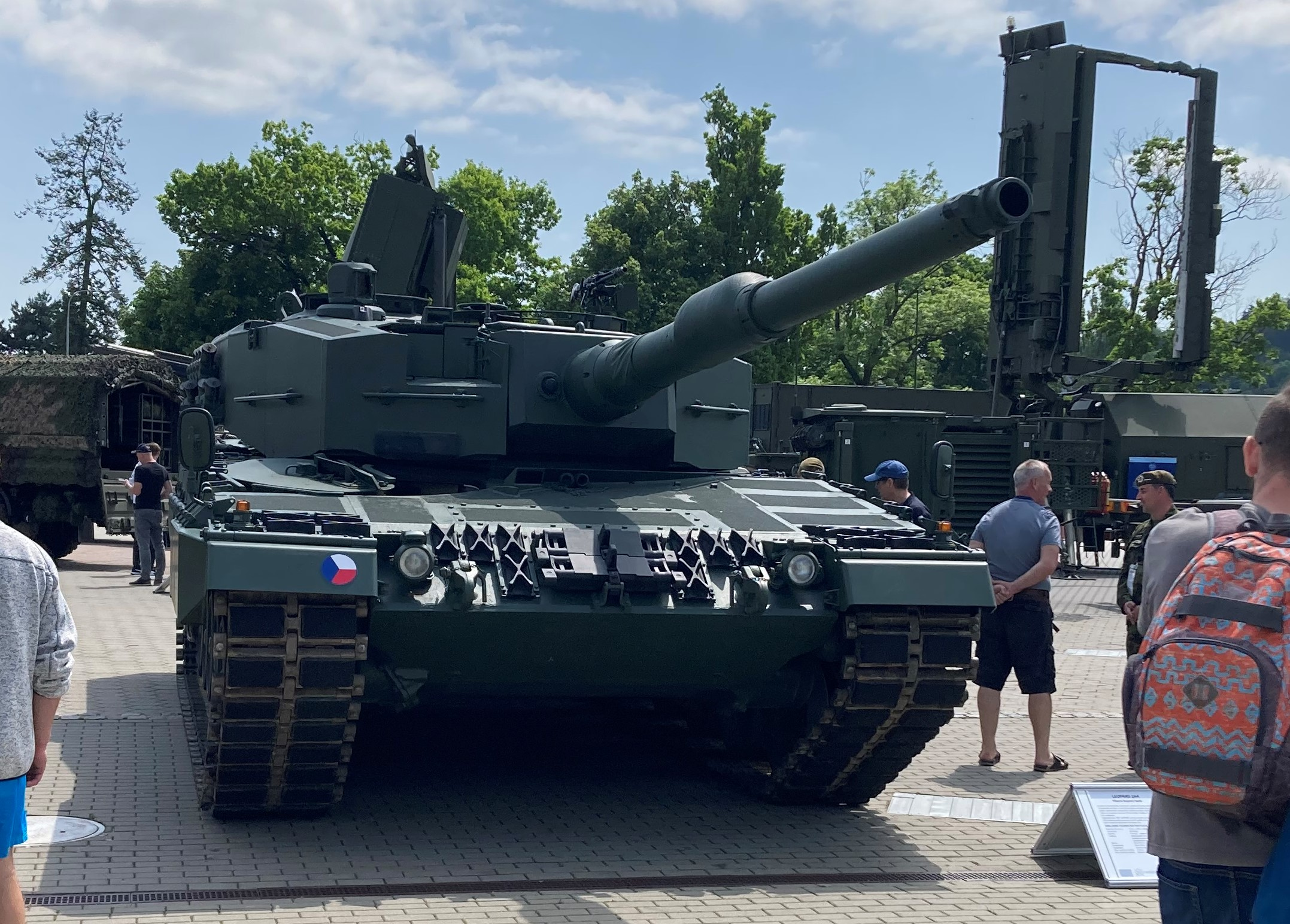
Leopard 2A4 tank (to be replaced by Leopard 2A8)

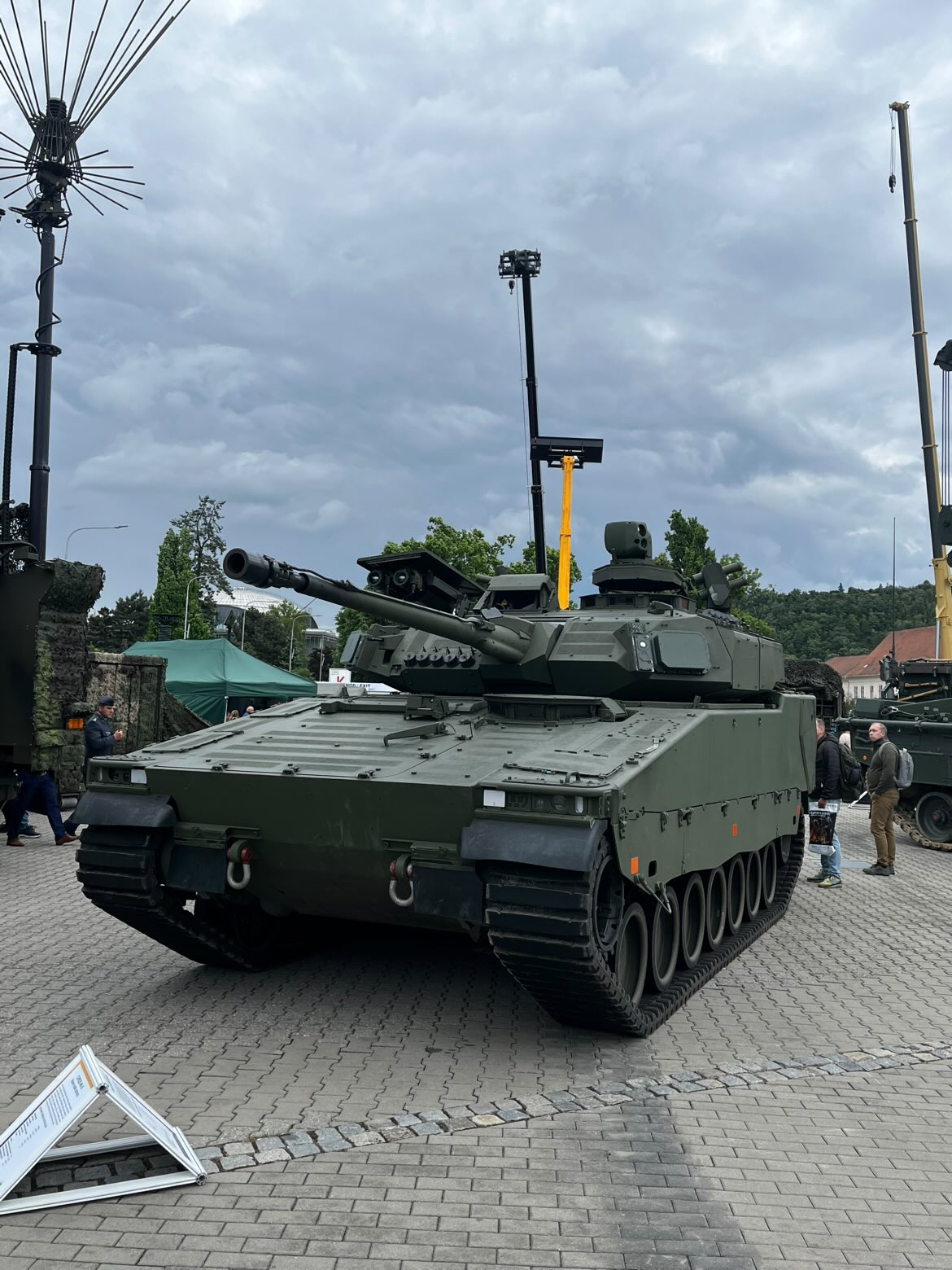
CV90 MkIV IFV (currently replacing BMP-2)

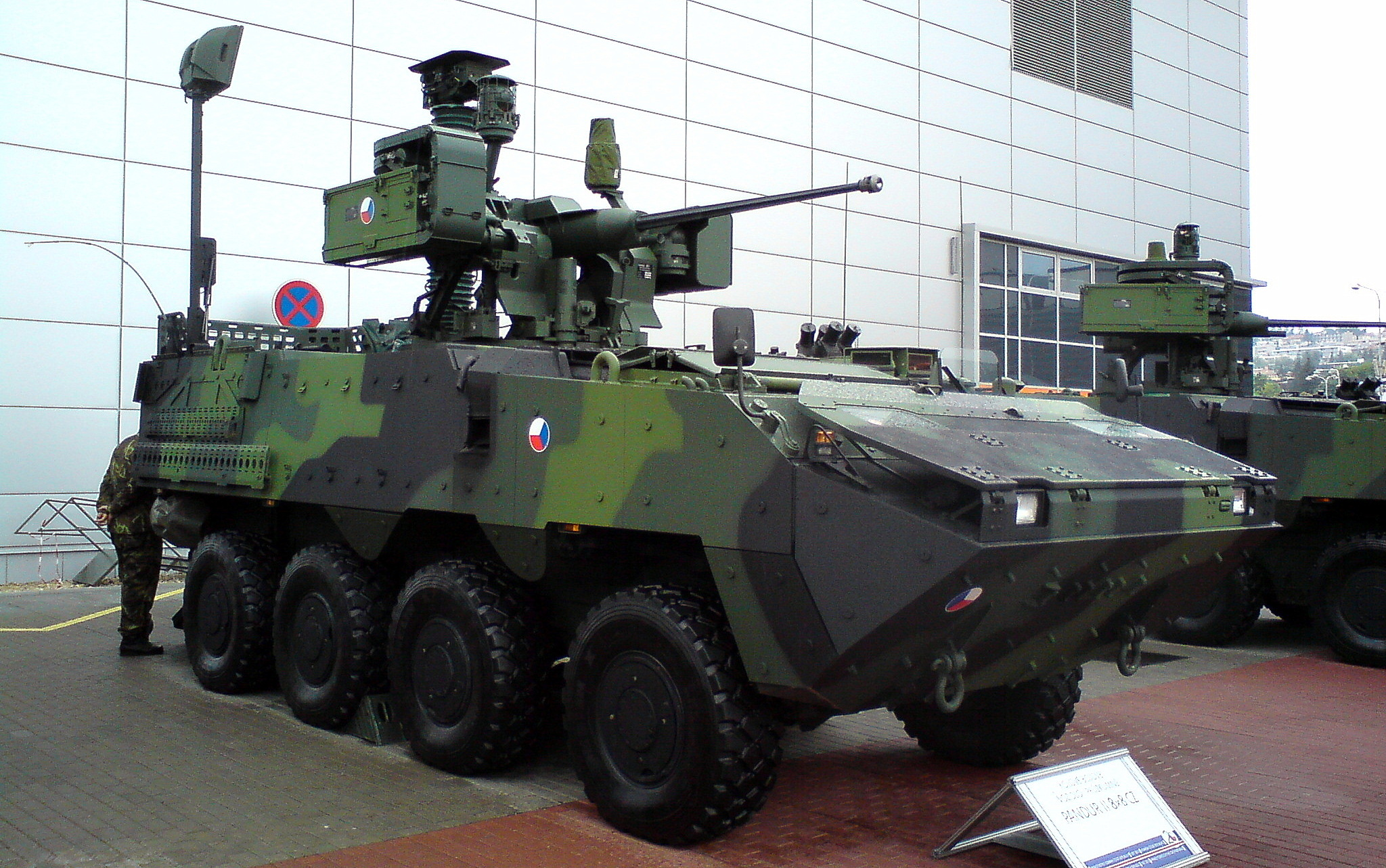
Pandur II IFV

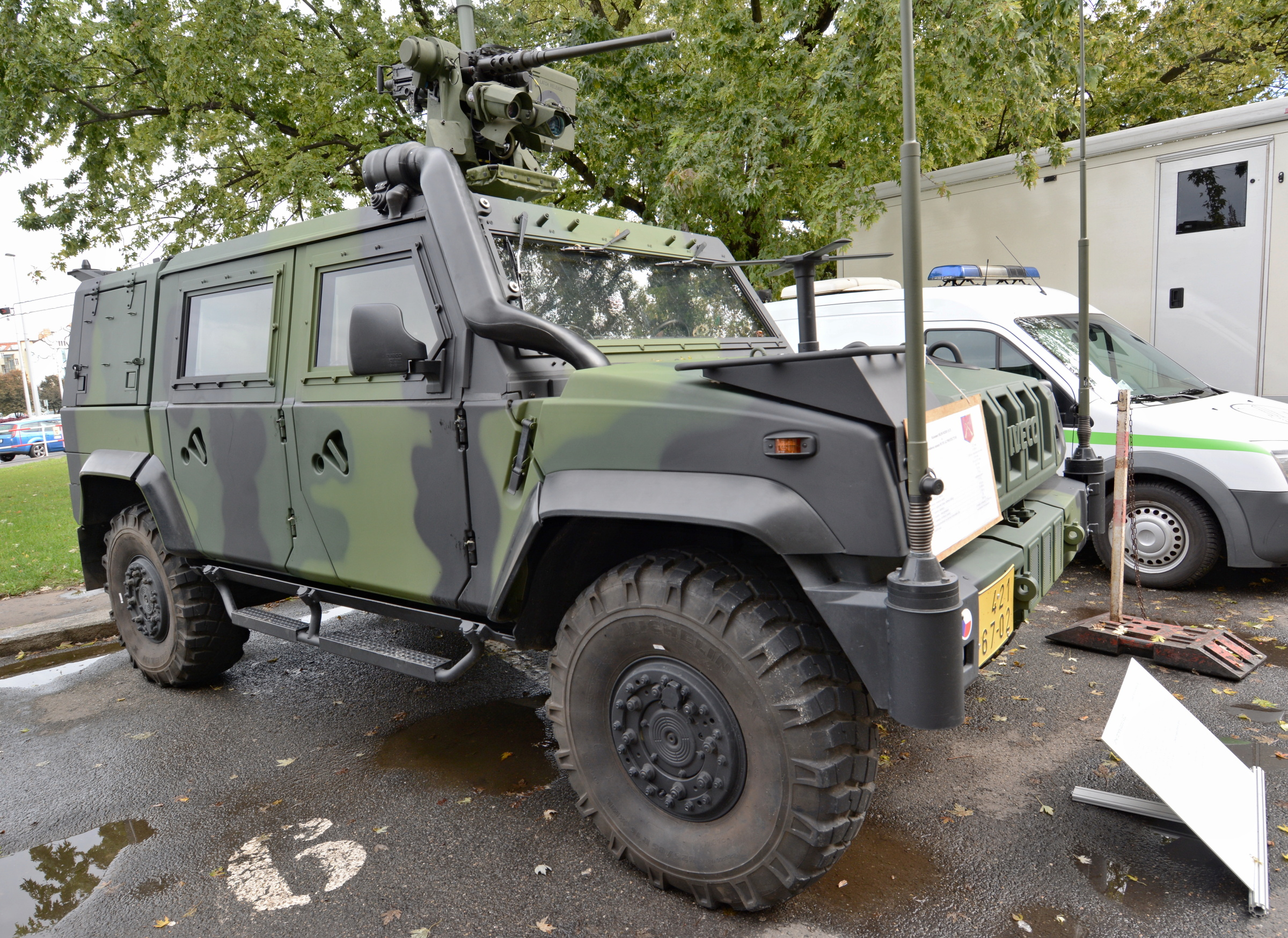
Iveco LMV IMV

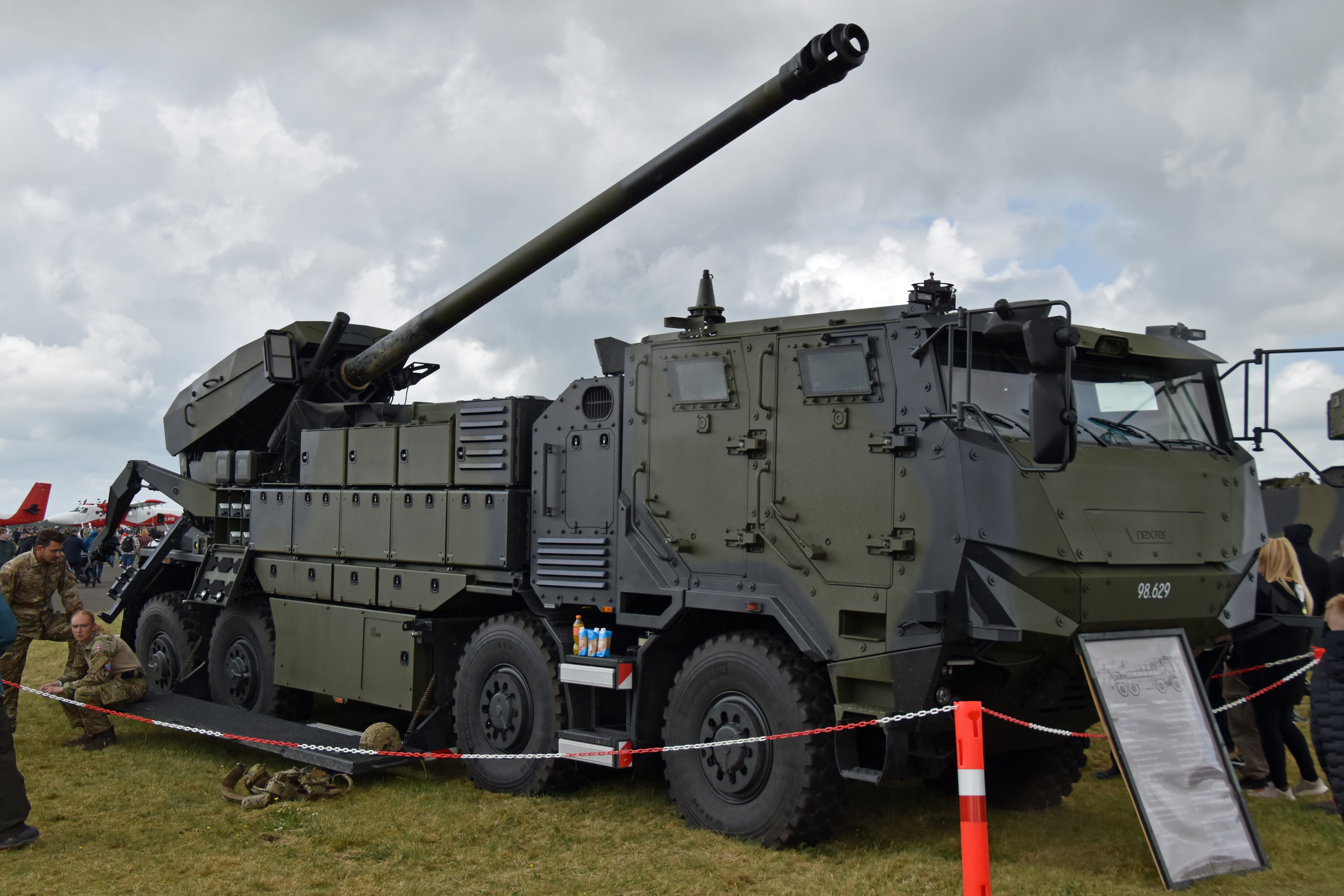
CAESAR II self-propelled howitzer (currently replacing 152 mm SpGH DANA)

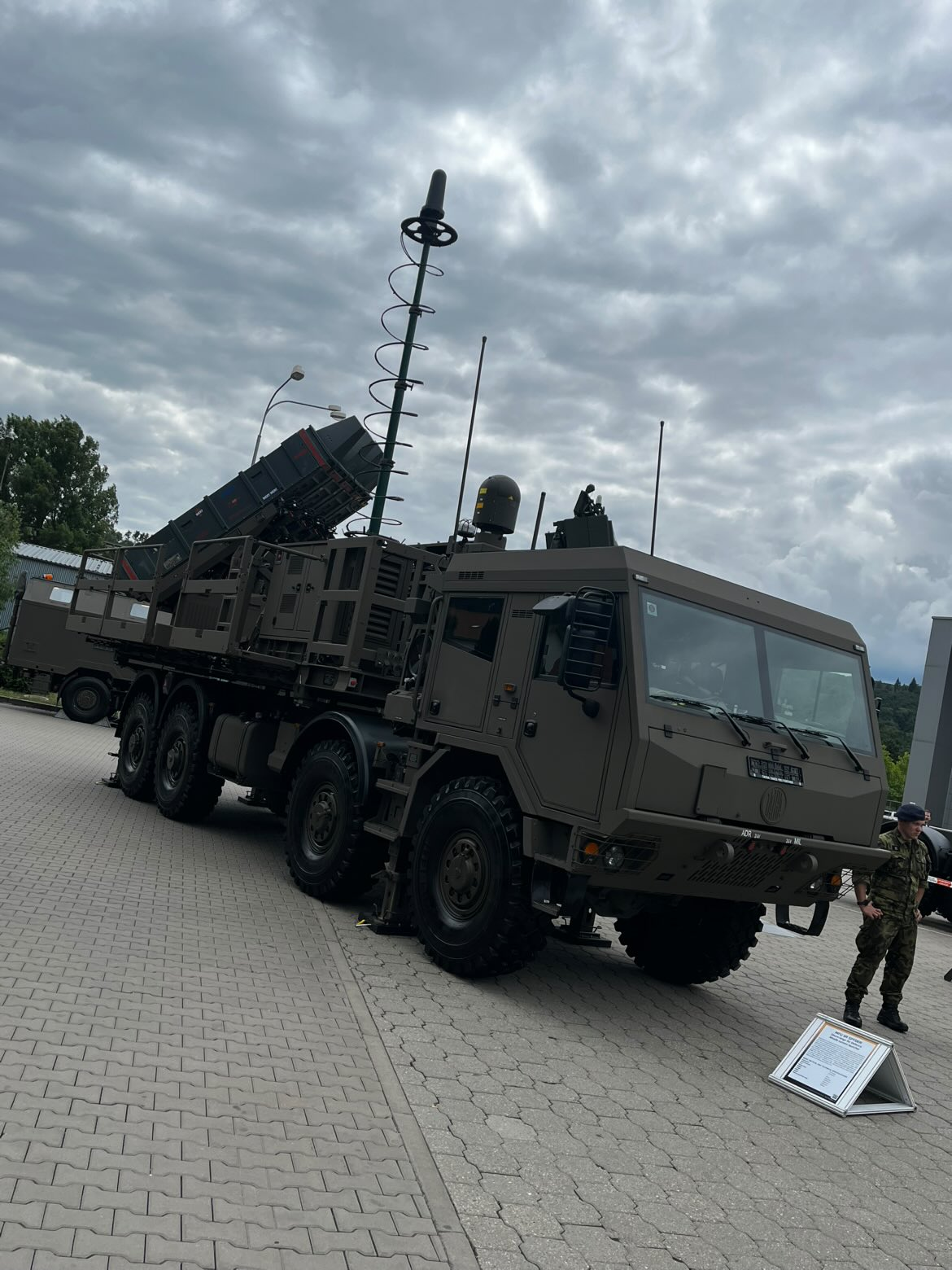
SPYDER LR air defense system (currently replacing 2K12 Kub-M2)
Logistics and other equipment
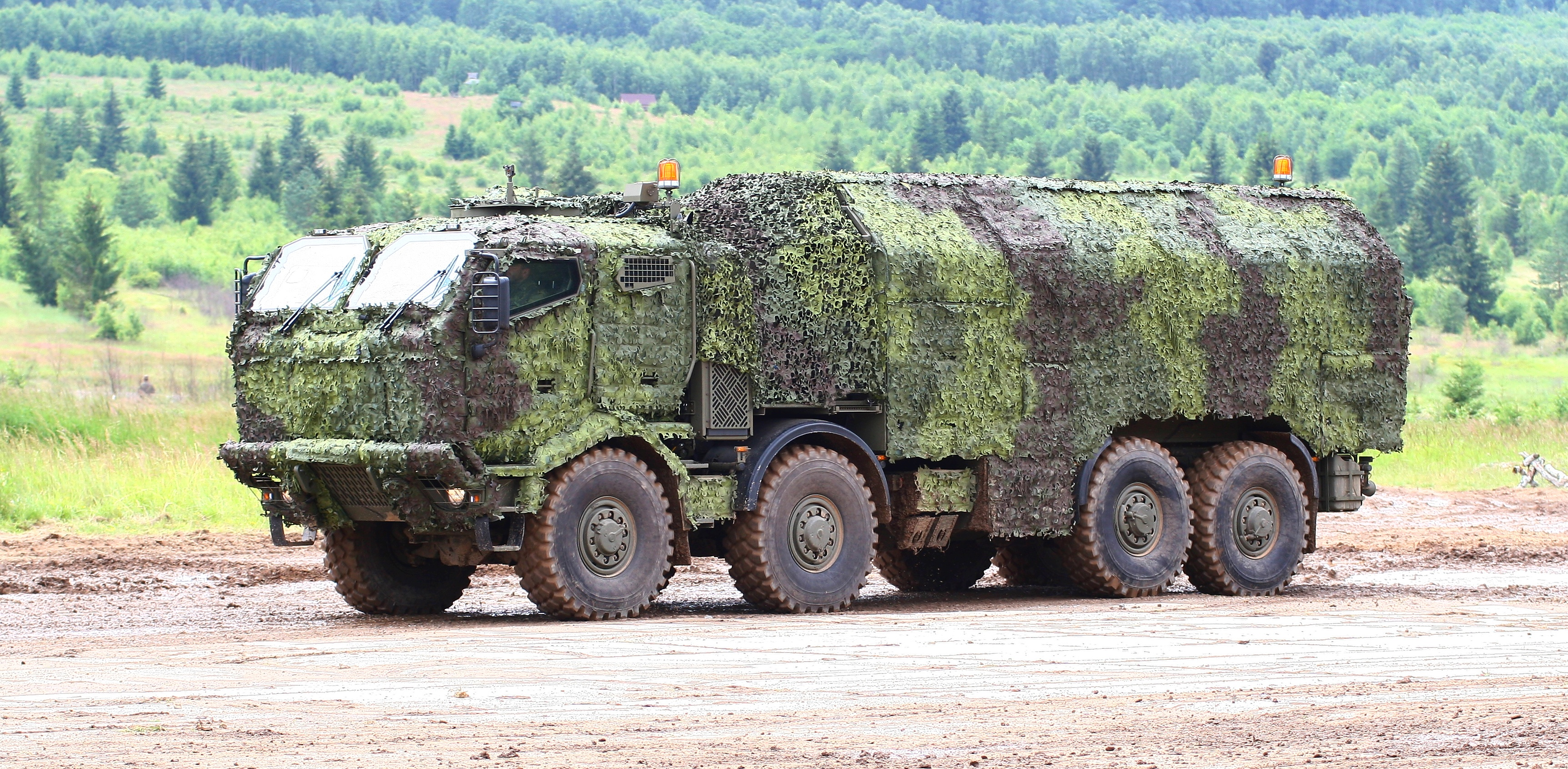
Tatra 815-7 heavy truck

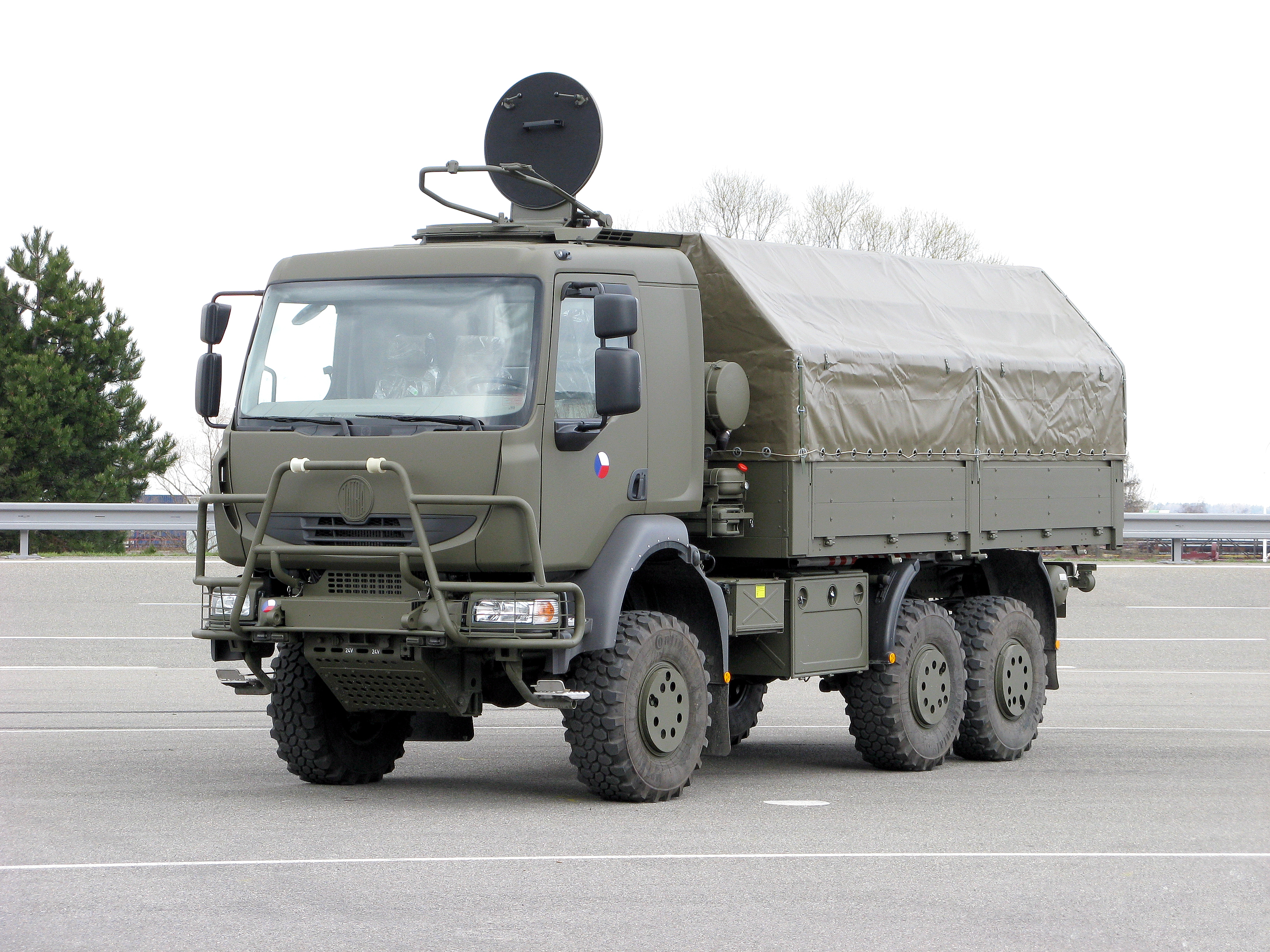
Tatra 810 medium truck

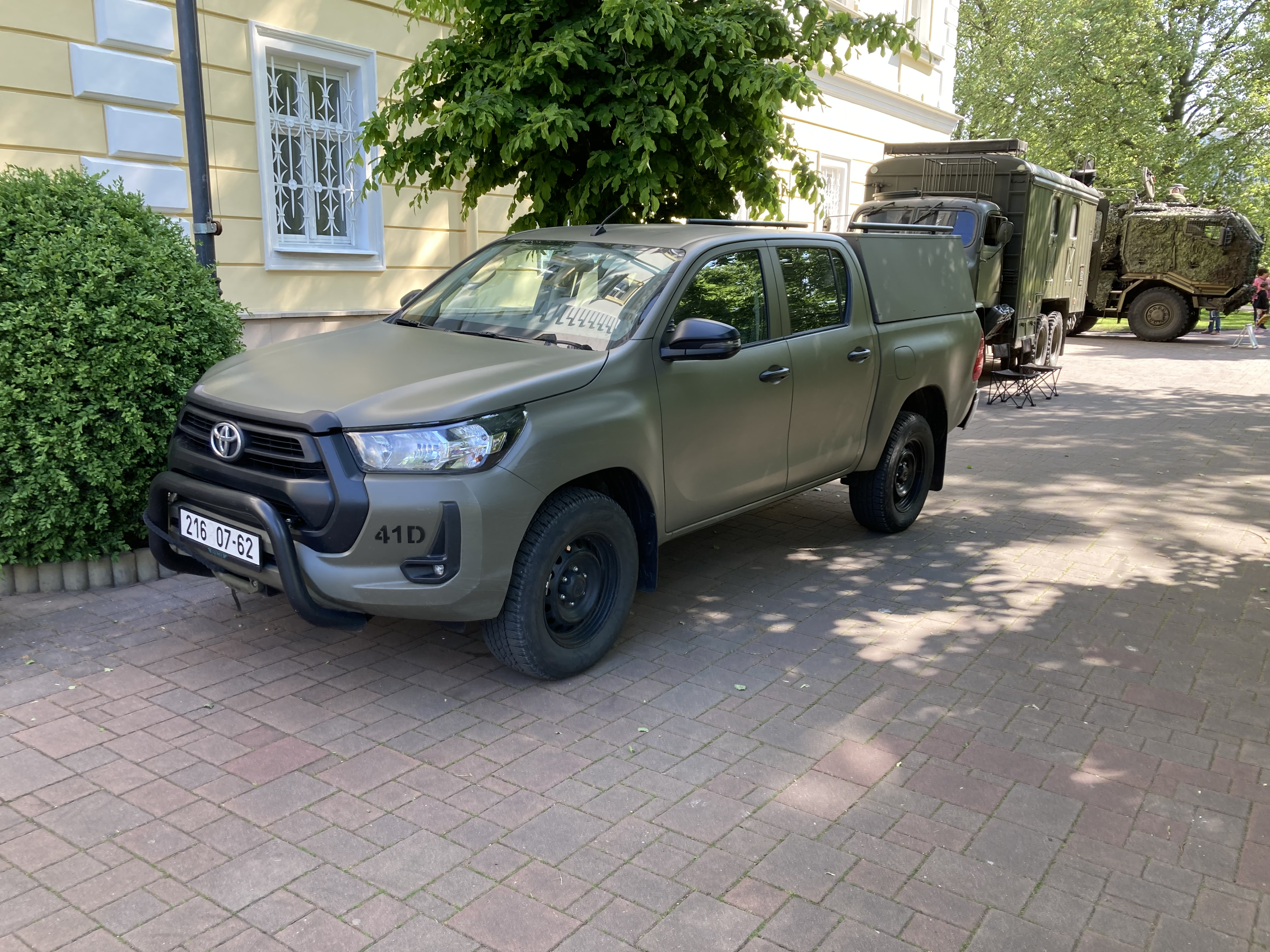
Toyota Hilux

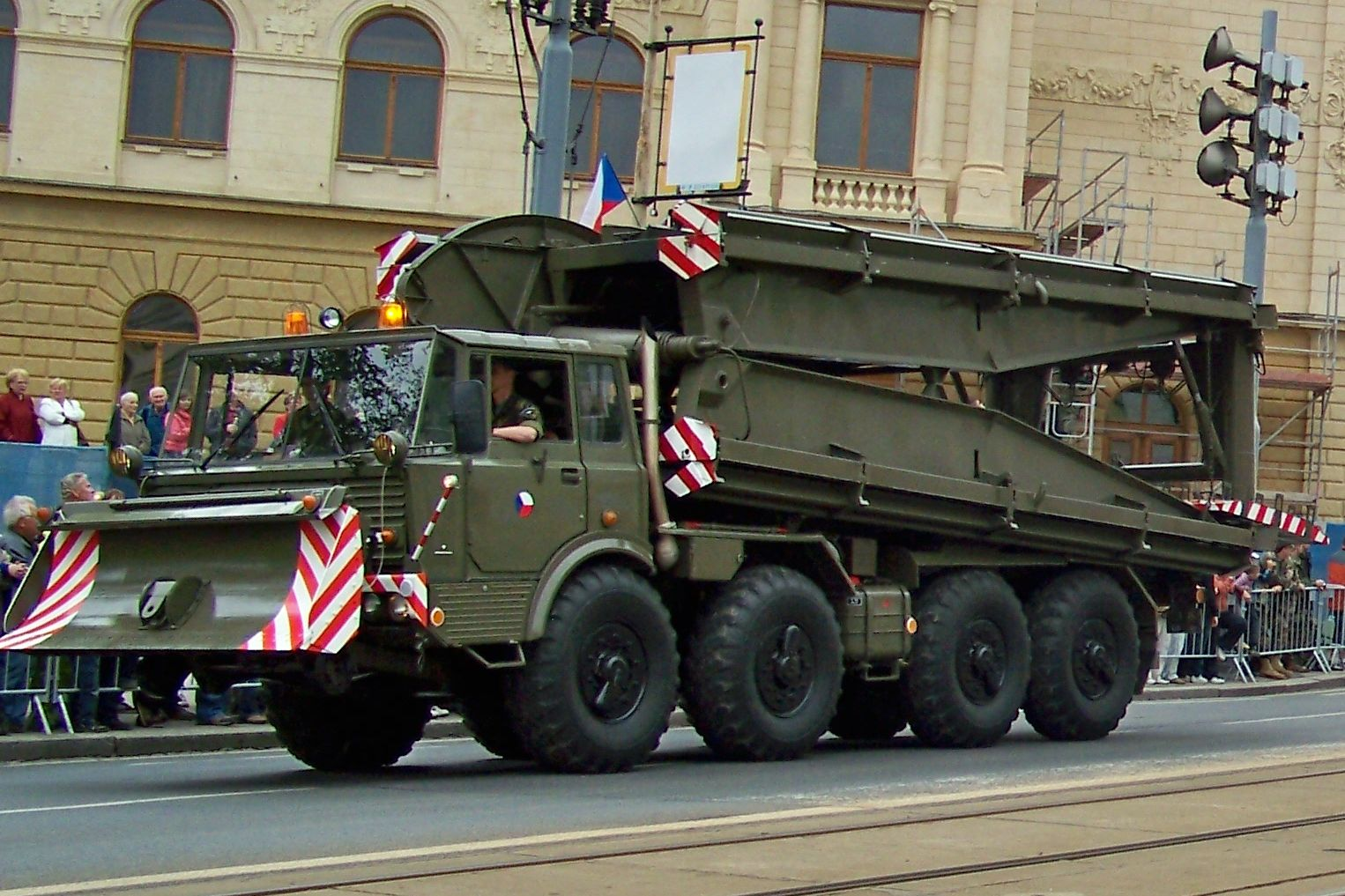
AM 50 vehicle launched assault bridge

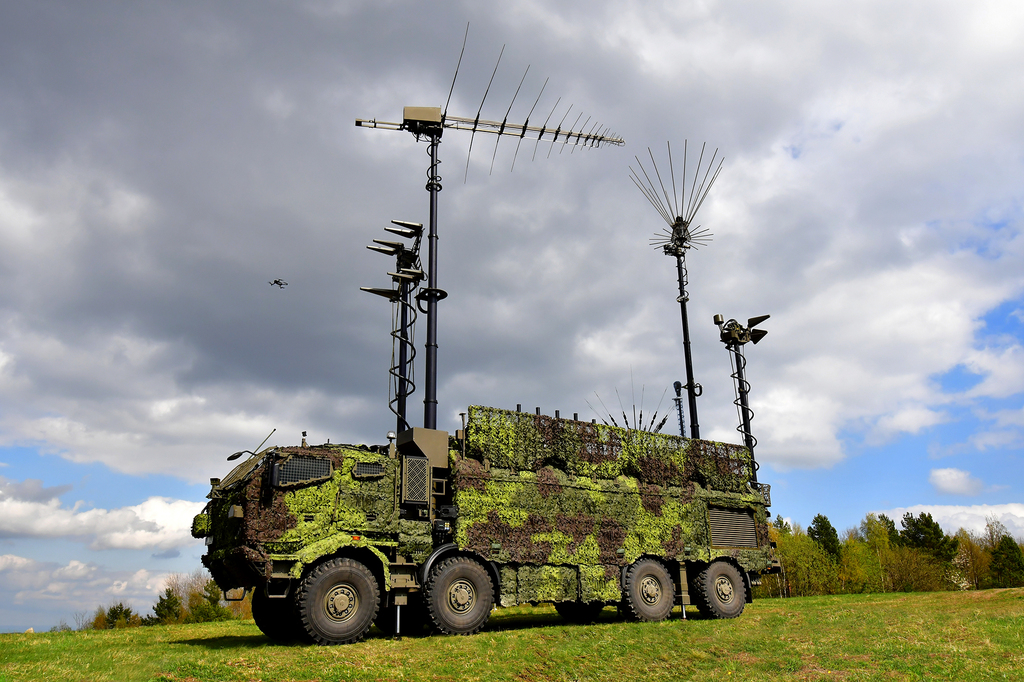
STARKOM electronic warfare vehicle

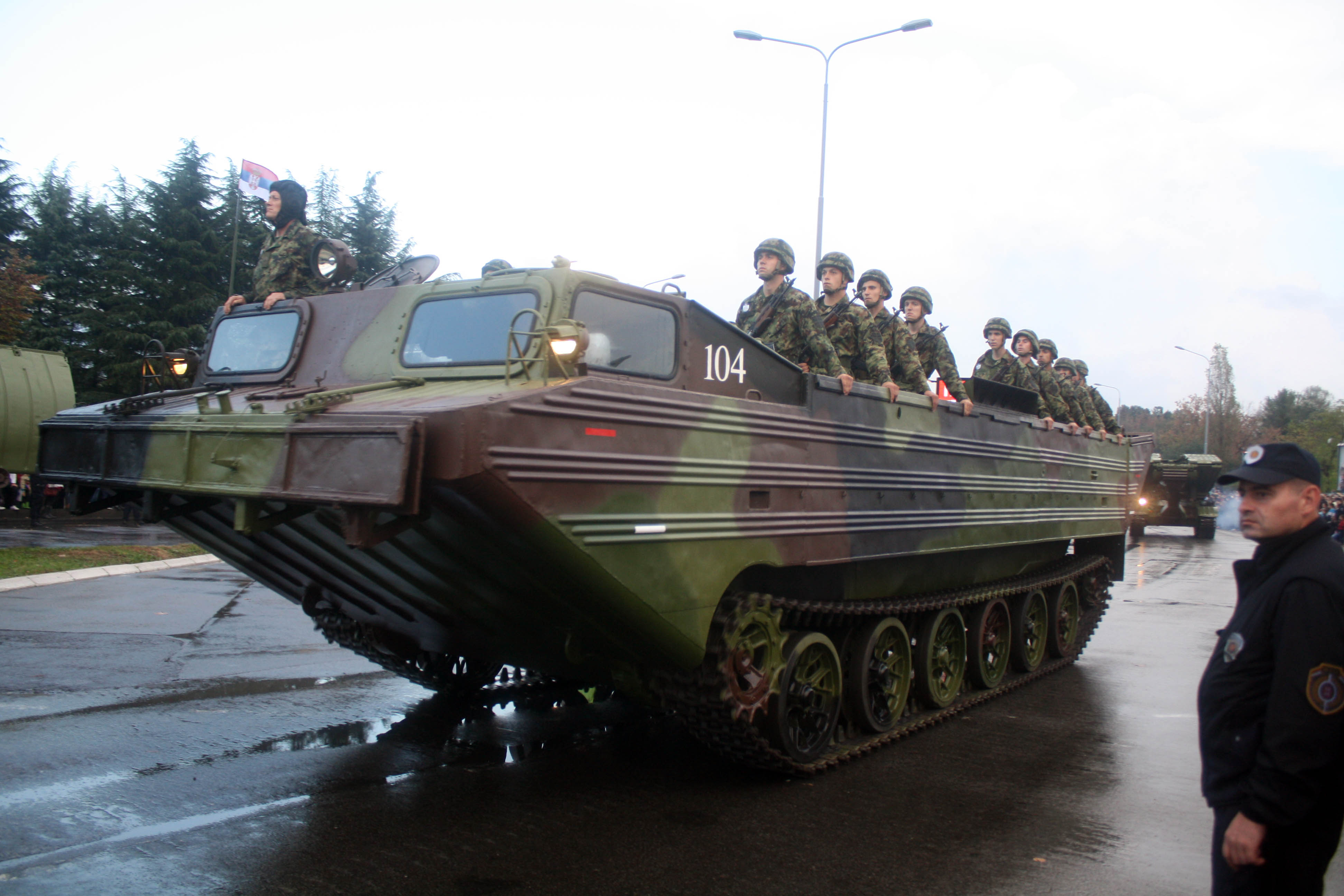
PTS (vehicle) tracked amphibious transport
Air Force
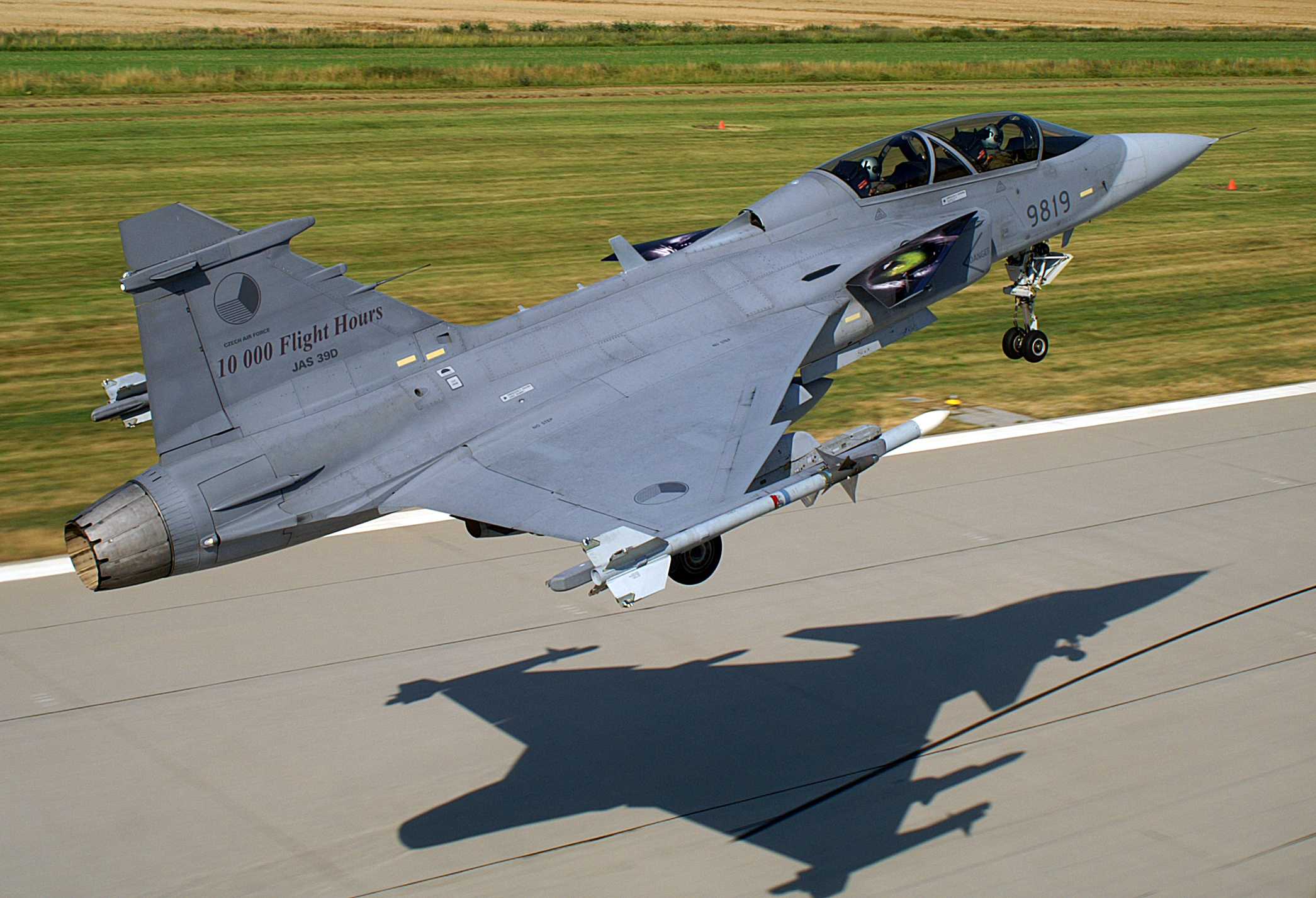
Saab JAS 39 Gripen multi-role fighter (to be replaced by F-35 Lightning II)

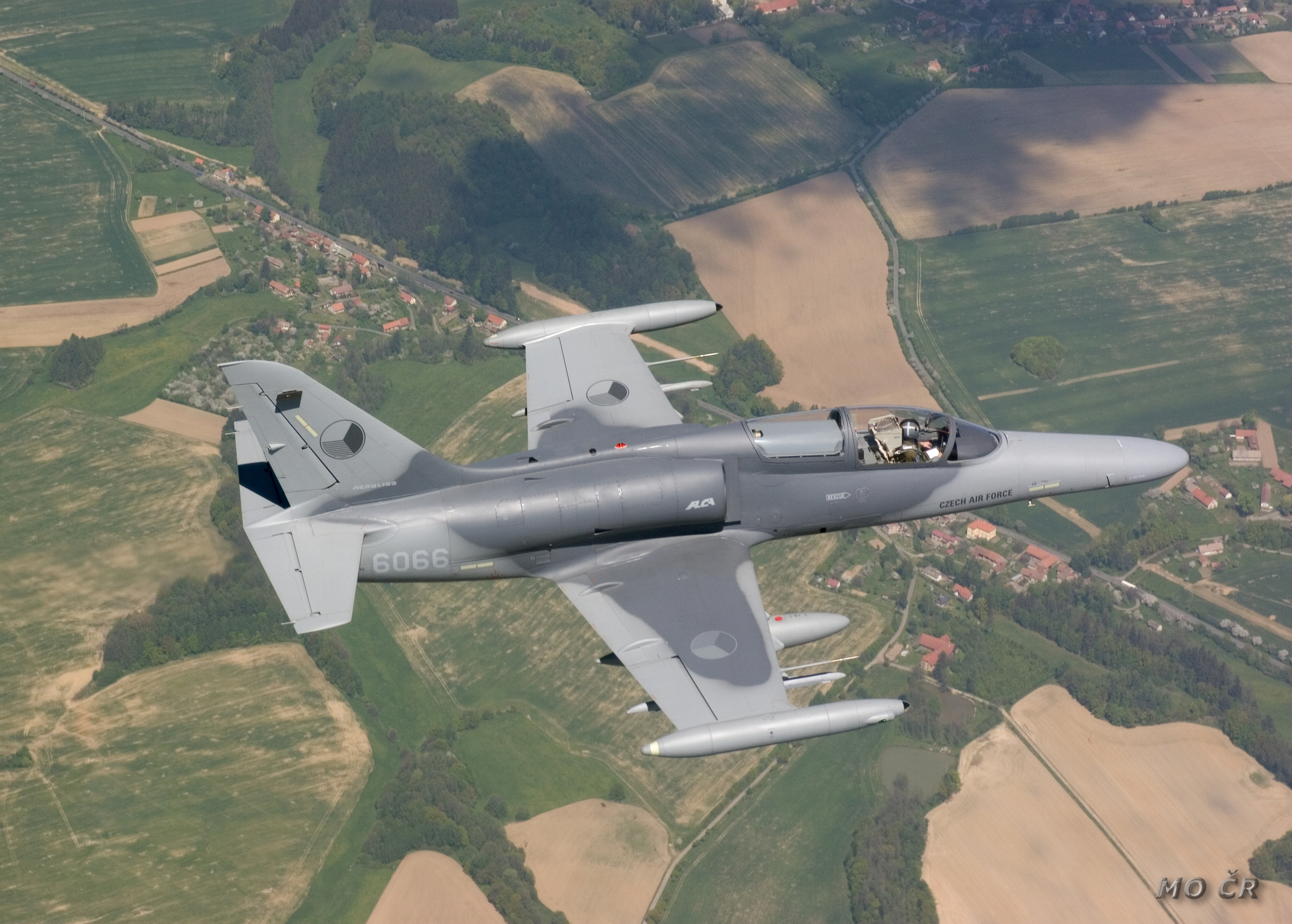
Aero L-159 ALCA light combat aircraft

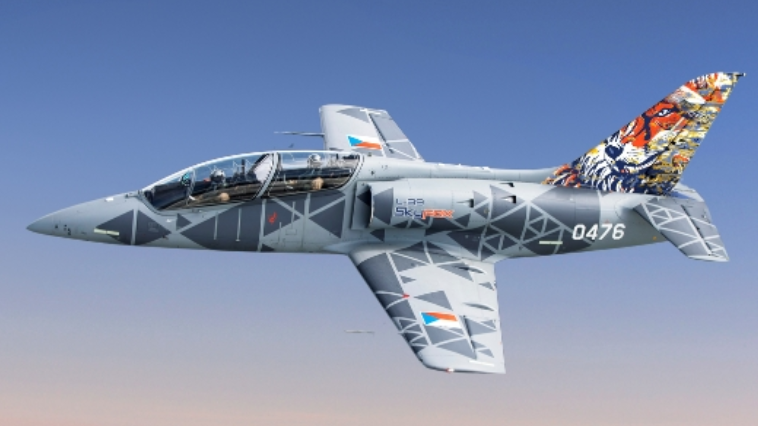
Aero L-39 Skyfox trainer and light combat aircraft

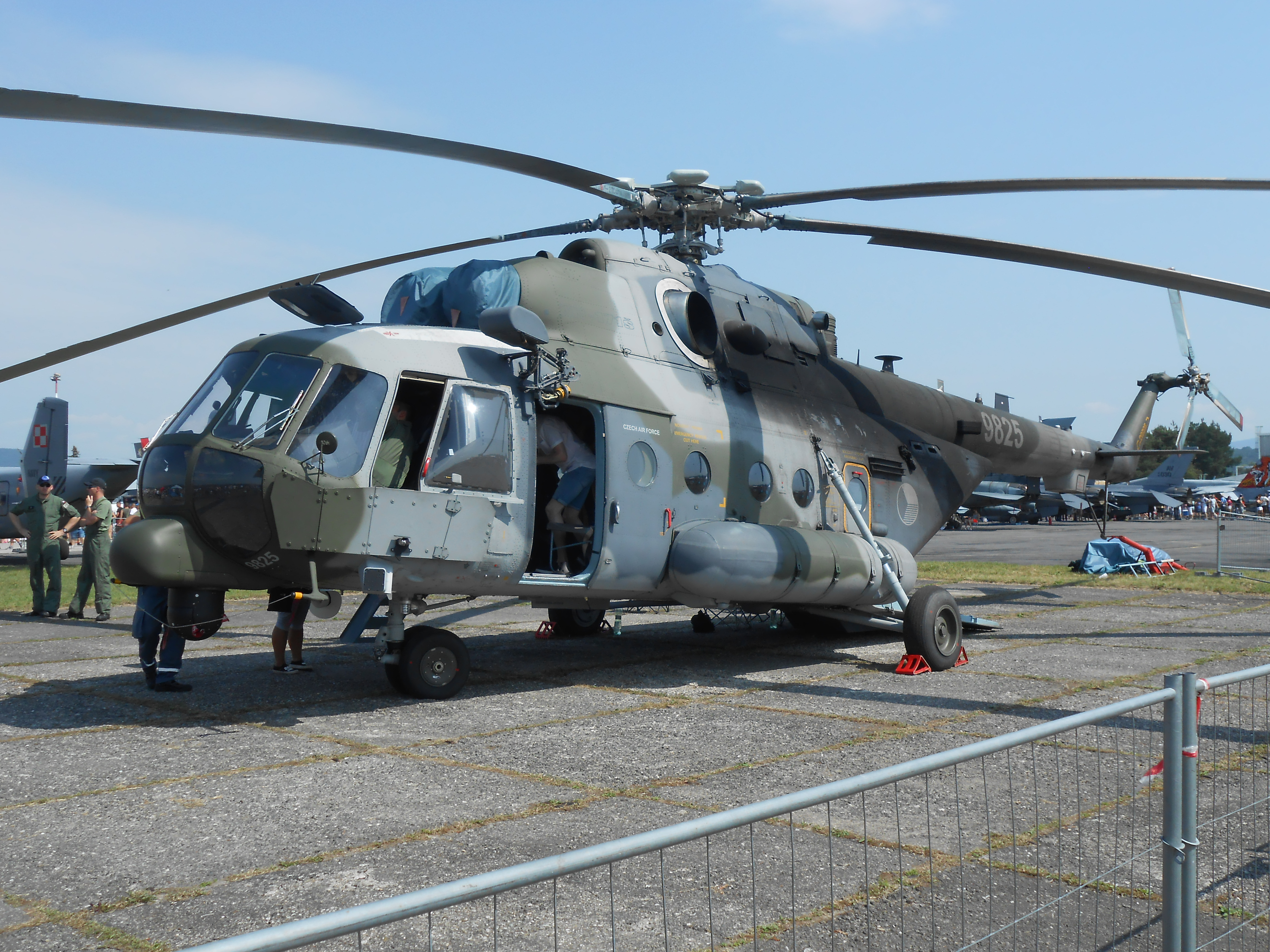
Mil Mi 171Sh utility helicopter (expected to remain in service until 2035)

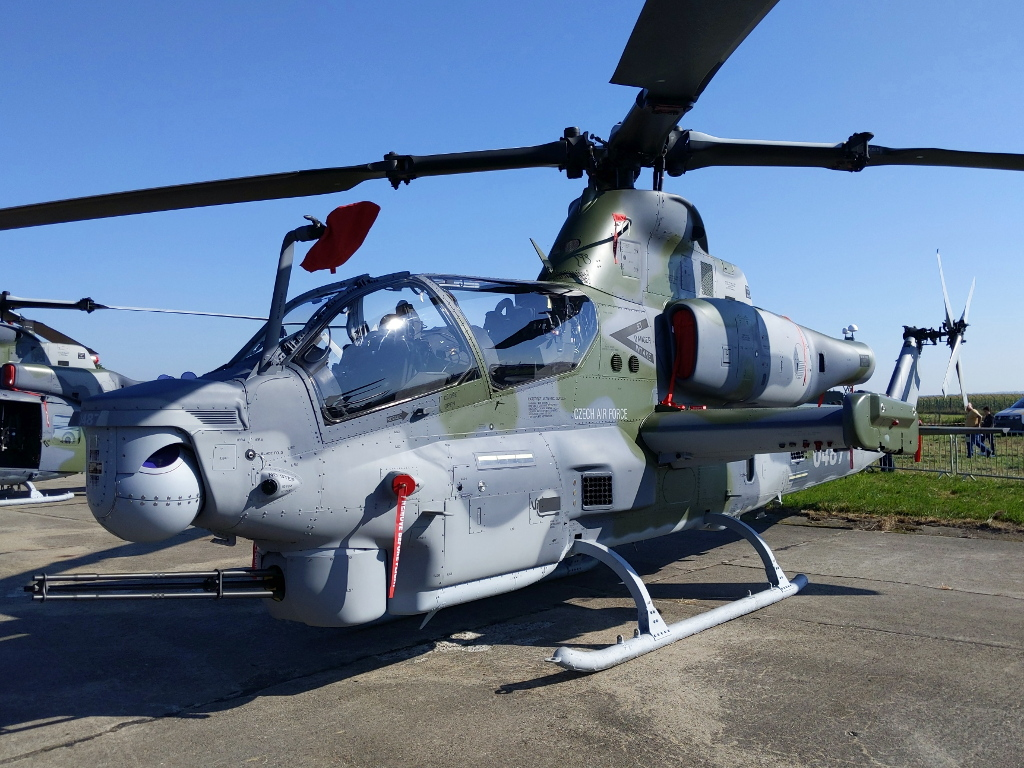
Bell AH-1Z Viper attack helicopter

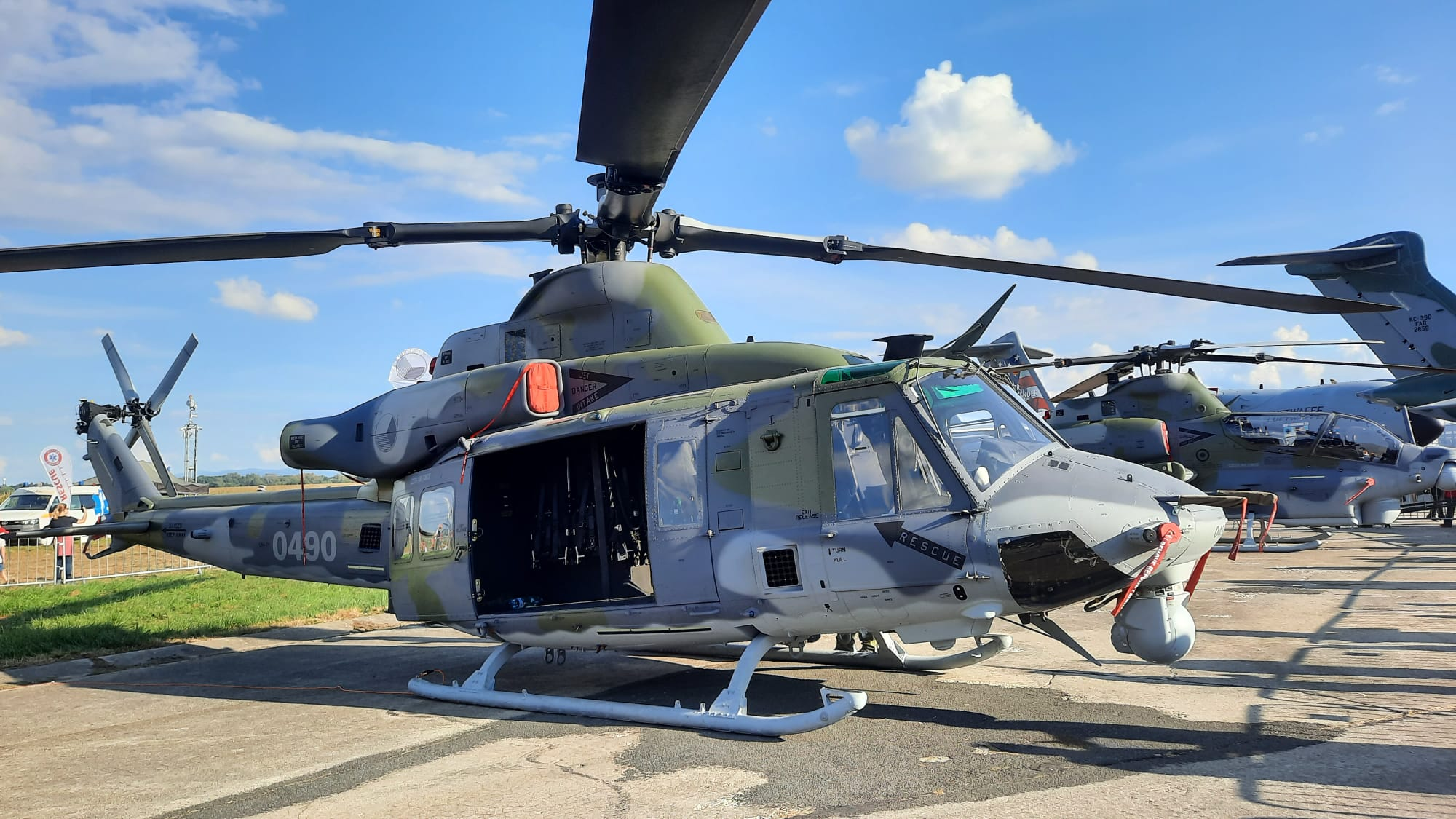
Bell UH-1Y Venom utility helicopter

== Uniforms ==
Different types of Czech Army uniforms:

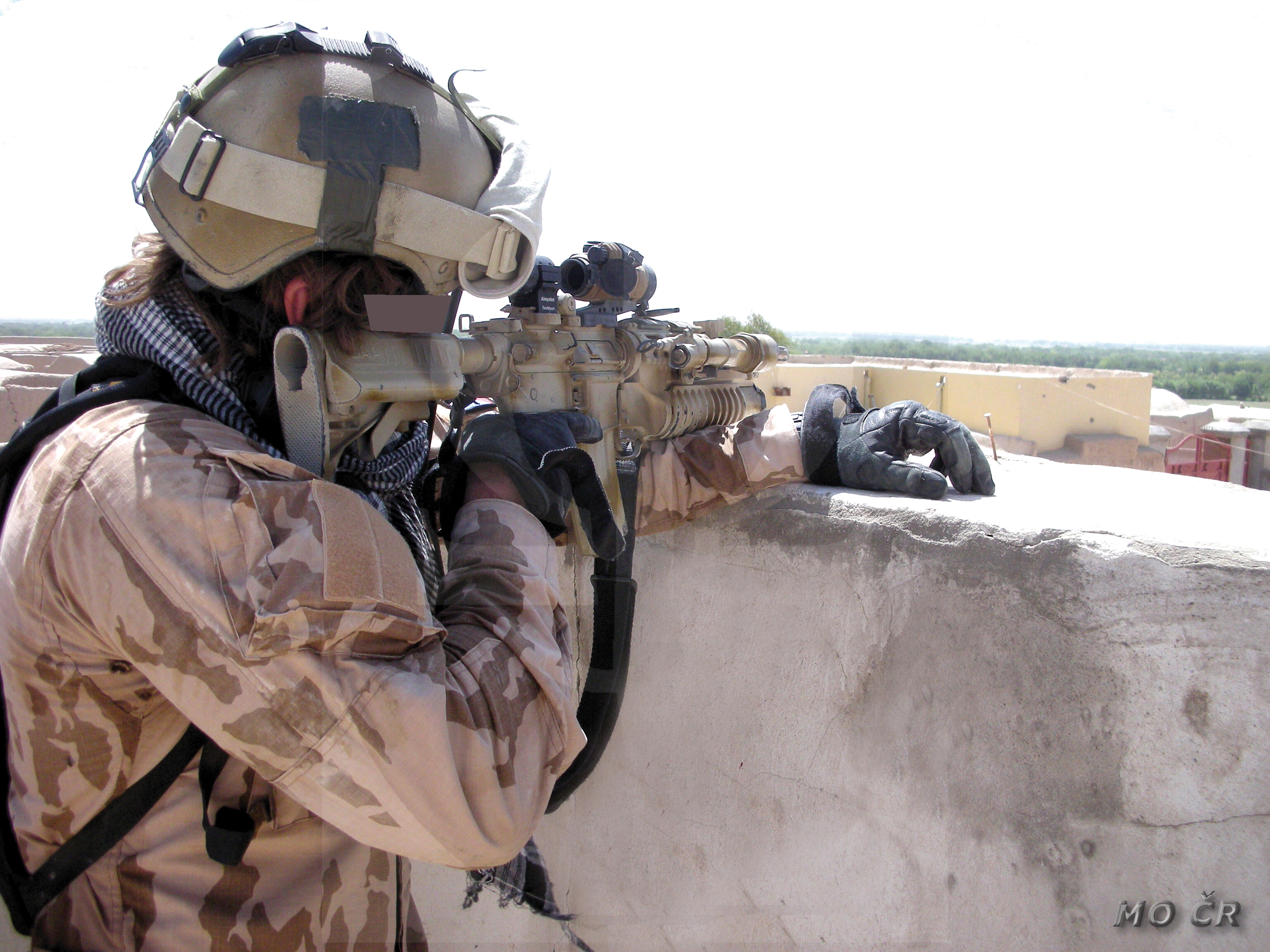
Commando soldier from ÚSO VP SOG in desert camouflage uniform in Afghanistan

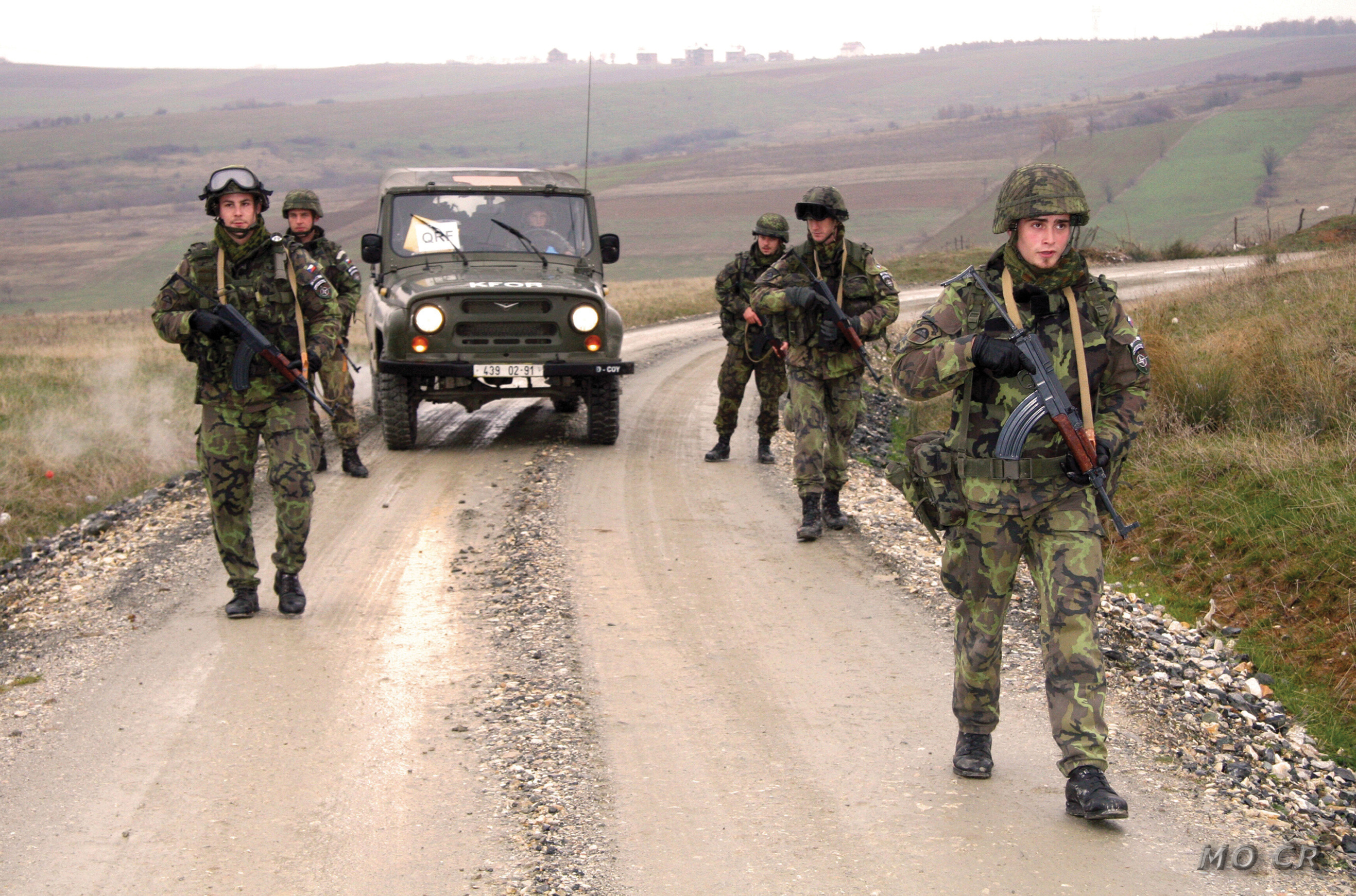
Standard VZ.95 pattern camouflage uniform

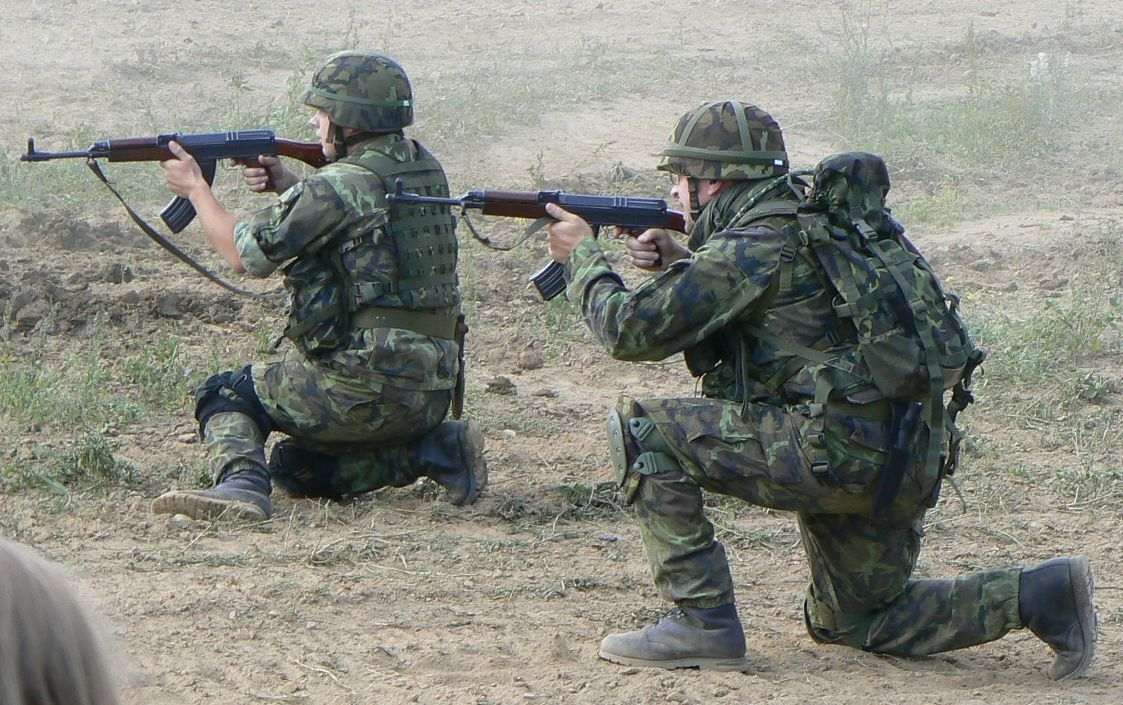
Members of the Active Reserve during exercise

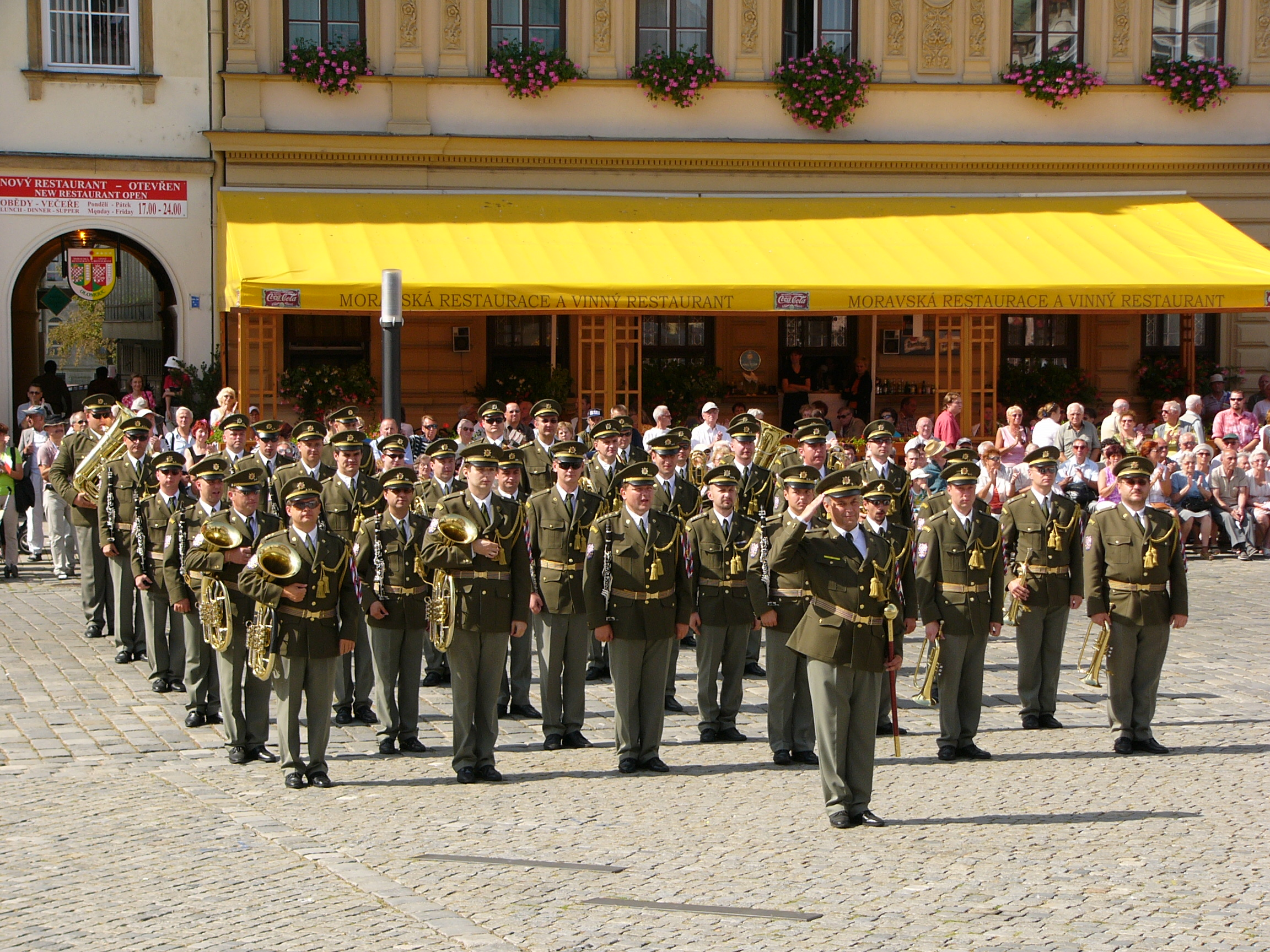
Czech military band in Olomouc

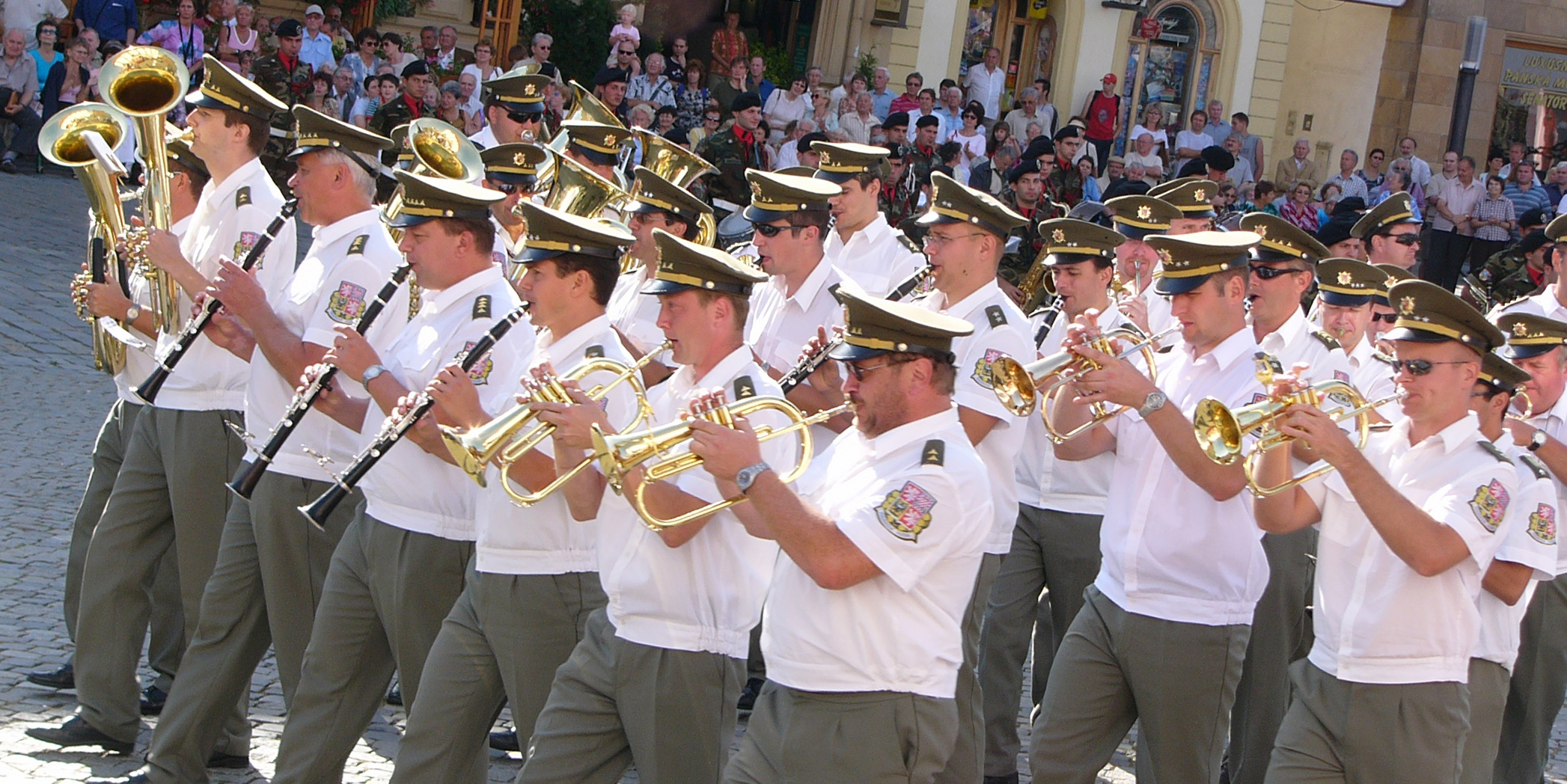
Czech military band in Olomouc

== Commanding officers ==
- Chief of the General Staff: Lieutenant general Miroslav Hlaváč
- First Deputy Chief of the General Staff: Major General Petr Čepelka
- Deputy Chief of the General Staff of the AČR-Chief of Staff: Major General Pavel Lipka
- Deputy Chief of the General Staff - Inspector of the AČR: Major General Miloslav Lafek

== See also ==
- Czechoslovak Naval Forces
- Government Army
