= STV Group (defence company) =

- Native name: STV GROUP a.s.
- Type: Joint-stock company
- Industry: Arms industry
- Founded: 6 June 2000; 26 years ago
- Headquarters: Prague, Czech Republic
- Key people: Tomáš Rubáček (CEO)
- Products: Ammunition; Explosives; Military equipment
- Parent: STV INVEST a.s.
- Website: www.stvgroup.cz/en/

STV GROUP a.s., commonly known as STV Group, is a Czech defence company headquartered in Prague. It manufactures ammunition and explosives and repairs and modernizes military equipment. Its main production facilities are in Polička, and it is the only producer of large-calibre ammunition in the Czech Republic.

The company is part of the STV Group, whose parent company is STV INVEST a.s. Ammunition has been produced at the Polička site since 1920. The present company was established in 2000.

STV expanded rapidly after the Russian invasion of Ukraine, as European demand for ammunition increased. In 2024, it reported consolidated revenue of almost CZK 14 billion and net profit of CZK 5.5 billion.

== History ==
Ammunition production in Polička began in 1920 with the establishment of the First Military Ammunition Factory. The plant produced grenades and artillery ammunition for the armed forces of Czechoslovakia. Production was discontinued in 1990, after the Velvet Revolution of 1989, and later resumed.

The present STV GROUP a.s. was established in June 2000. The Polička complex later became an important production base for companies in the STV Group. Poličské strojírny became part of the group in 2015. By 2017, STV's operations in Polička included ammunition production and the repair of heavy military equipment.

In 2021, French defence company Nexter and STV Group agreed to cooperate on 155 mm ammunition for the Czech Army's CAESAR howitzers. The agreement covered the local production and certification of shells and modular charges.

STV increased production after Russia's full-scale invasion of Ukraine in 2022. In 2023, it began trial operation of a new large-calibre ammunition filling line in Polička, with annual capacity of up to 150,000 rounds depending on calibre.

In 2024, the European Commission selected an STV project to increase ammunition-production capacity for funding under the Act in Support of Ammunition Production. The project received a grant of approximately €5 million.

Revenue rose from about CZK 4 billion in 2023 to almost CZK 14 billion in 2024.

In 2025, the company announced an investment programme of about CZK 5 billion to expand ammunition production and manufacture more components domestically. The programme included production of forged projectile bodies for 122 mm, 152 mm and 155 mm artillery ammunition.

== Operations ==
STV Group's main production facilities are in Polička. The company manufactures artillery, tank, mortar and medium-calibre ammunition, as well as explosives and engineering ammunition. Its artillery products include 122 mm and 152 mm ammunition and NATO-standard 155 mm ammunition.

At Polička, STV also repairs and modernizes tanks, infantry fighting vehicles and artillery systems. STV is a supplier to the Czech Armed Forces. In 2024, the Czech Ministry of Defence awarded STV a CZK 3.74 billion contract for ammunition and components for the Bell AH-1Z Viper and Bell UH-1Y Venom helicopters. STV has also contracted to supply the Czech Army with the Sentry anti-tank mine system.

In 2024 and 2025, the Czech government financed approximately CZK 1.7 billion of ammunition purchased from STV Group through the Czech ammunition initiative. In 2025, more than 90 percent of the group's revenue came from exports.

== Corporate structure ==
STV Group is part of the wider corporate group whose parent company is STV INVEST, which is jointly controlled by Martin Drda and Ludmila Drdová.

The wider group includes companies involved in ammunition and explosives, military-equipment repair, weapons, tactical equipment, ballistic protection and mechanical engineering. Its businesses include STV Technology, Poličské strojírny and Fenix Protector.
