= List of hospitals in the Czech Republic =

This is a list of hospitals in the Czech Republic.

Name	City / Town	Region
Teaching Hospital Královské Vinohrady	Prague	Prague
Bulovka Hospital	Prague	Prague
Motol University Hospital	Prague	Prague
Thomayer University Hospital	Prague	Prague
General Teaching Hospital	Prague	Prague
Military University Hospital Prague	Prague	Prague
Na Homolce Hospital	Prague	Prague
Hospital of the Merciful Sisters of St. Charles Borromeo	Prague	Prague
Na Františku Hospital	Prague	Prague
Institute for Mother and Child Care	Prague	Prague
Institute for Clinical and Experimental Medicine	Prague	Prague
Mediterra	Prague	Prague
Psychiatric Hospital Bohnice	Prague	Prague
Rudolf and Stefanie Hospital	Benešov	Central Bohemian
Brandýs nad Labem Hospital	Brandýs nad Labem-Stará Boleslav	Central Bohemian
Čáslav Hospital	Čáslav	Central Bohemian
NH Hořovice Hospital	Hořovice	Central Bohemian
Kladno Regional Hospital	Kladno	Central Bohemian
National Institute of Mental Health	Klecany	Central Bohemian
Kolín Regional Hospital	Kolín	Central Bohemian
Kutná Hora Hospital	Kutná Hora	Central Bohemian
Mělník Hospital	Mělník	Central Bohemian
Městec Králové Hospital	Městec Králové	Central Bohemian
Mladá Boleslav Regional Hospital	Mladá Boleslav	Central Bohemian
ALMEDA Neratovice Hospital	Neratovice	Central Bohemian
Na Pleši Hospital	Nová Ves pod Pleší	Central Bohemian
Nymburk Hospital	Nymburk	Central Bohemian
Příbram Regional Hospital	Příbram	Central Bohemian
Masaryk Hospital	Rakovník	Central Bohemian
AGEL Hospital	Říčany	Central Bohemian
Slaný Hospital	Slaný	Central Bohemian
České Budějovice Hospital	České Budějovice	South Bohemian
Český Krumlov Hospital	Český Krumlov	South Bohemian
Jindřichův Hradec Hospital	Jindřichův Hradec	South Bohemian
Písek Hospital	Písek	South Bohemian
Prachatice Hospital	Prachatice	South Bohemian
Strakonice Hospital	Strakonice	South Bohemian
Tábor Hospital	Tábor	South Bohemian
Domažlice Hospital	Domažlice	Plzeň
Klatovy Hospital	Klatovy	Plzeň
University Hospital Plzeň	Plzeň	Plzeň
Mulač Hospital	Plzeň	Plzeň
Hospital at St. George	Plzeň	Plzeň
PRIVAMED Plzeň Hospital	Plzeň	Plzeň
Rokycany Hospital	Rokycany	Plzeň
Stod Hospital	Stod	Plzeň
Sušice Hospital	Sušice	Plzeň
Karlovy Vary Regional Hospital	Karlovy Vary	Karlovy Vary
Ostrov Hospital	Ostrov	Karlovy Vary
Sokolov Hospital	Sokolov	Karlovy Vary
Mining Hospital	Bílina	Ústí nad Labem
Chomutov Hospital	Chomutov	Ústí nad Labem
Děčín Hospital	Děčín	Ústí nad Labem
VITA Town Hospital	Duchcov	Ústí nad Labem
Kadaň Hospital	Kadaň	Ústí nad Labem
Litoměřice Hospital	Litoměřice	Ústí nad Labem
Most Hospital	Most	Ústí nad Labem
Roudnice nad Labem Hospital	Roudnice nad Labem	Ústí nad Labem
Teplice Hospital	Teplice	Ústí nad Labem
Masaryk Hospital	Ústí nad Labem	Ústí nad Labem
Žatec Hospital	Žatec	Ústí nad Labem
Česká Lípa Hospital	Česká Lípa	Liberec
Frýdlant Hospital	Frýdlant	Liberec
Jablonec nad Nisou Hospital	Jablonec nad Nisou	Liberec
MNM Jilemnice Hospital	Jilemnice	Liberec
Liberec Regional Hospital	Liberec	Liberec
MNM Semily Hospital	Semily	Liberec
Tanvald Hospital	Tanvald	Liberec
Turnov Hospital	Turnov	Liberec
Broumov Hospital	Broumov	Hradec Králové
Dvůr Králové nad Labem Town Hospital	Dvůr Králové nad Labem	Hradec Králové
University Hospital Hradec Králové	Hradec Králové	Hradec Králové
Jičín Regional Hospital	Jičín	Hradec Králové
Náchod Regional Hospital	Náchod	Hradec Králové
Nové Město nad Metují Hospital	Nové Město nad Metují	Hradec Králové
Nový Bydžov Hospital	Nový Bydžov	Hradec Králové
Rychnov nad Kněžnou Hospital	Rychnov nad Kněžnou	Hradec Králové
Trutnov Regional Hospital	Trutnov	Hradec Králové
Vrchlabí Hospital	Vrchlabí	Hradec Králové
Chrudim Hospital	Chrudim	Pardubice
Litomyšl Hospital	Litomyšl	Pardubice
Pardubice Hospital	Pardubice	Pardubice
Svitavy Hospital	Svitavy	Pardubice
Ústí nad Orlicí Hospital	Ústí nad Orlicí	Pardubice
Havlíčkův Brod Hospital	Havlíčkův Brod	Vysočina
Jihlava Hospital	Jihlava	Vysočina
Nové Město na Moravě Hospital	Nové Město na Moravě	Vysočina
Pelhřimov Hospital	Pelhřimov	Vysočina
Třebíč Hospital	Třebíč	Vysočina
St. Zdislava Hospital	Velké Meziříčí	Vysočina
Blansko Hospital	Blansko	South Moravian
Boskovice Hospital	Boskovice	South Moravian
Břeclav Hospital	Břeclav	South Moravian
University Hospital Brno	Brno	South Moravian
Hospital at At. Anne	Brno	South Moravian
Merciful Brothers Hospital	Brno	South Moravian
Trauma Hospital in Brno	Brno	South Moravian
Centre for Cardiovascular and Transplant Surgery	Brno	South Moravian
Masaryk Institute of Oncology	Brno	South Moravian
SurGal Clinic	Brno	South Moravian
TGM Hodonín Hospital	Hodonín	South Moravian
Hustopeče Hospital	Hustopeče	South Moravian
Břeclav Hospital	Břeclav	South Moravian
Ivančice Hospital	Ivančice	South Moravian
Kyjov Hospital	Kyjov	South Moravian
Vyškov Hospital	Vyškov	South Moravian
Znojmo Hospital	Znojmo	South Moravian
Hranice Hospital	Hranice	Olomouc
AGEL Hospital	Jeseník	Olomouc
University Hospital Olomouc	Olomouc	Olomouc
Military Hospital Olomouc	Olomouc	Olomouc
Přerov Hospital	Přerov	Olomouc
Prostějov Hospital	Prostějov	Olomouc
Šternberk Hospital	Šternberk	Olomouc
Šumperk Hospital	Šumperk	Olomouc
Kroměříž Hospital	Kroměříž	Zlín
Uherské Hradiště Hospital	Uherské Hradiště	Zlín
Uherský Brod Hospital	Uherský Brod	Zlín
AGEL Hospital	Valašské Meziříčí	Zlín
Vsetín Hospital	Vsetín	Zlín
Tomáš Baťa Regional Hospital	Zlín	Zlín
EUC Clinic Zlín	Zlín	Zlín
Bílovec Hospital	Bílovec	Moravian-Silesian
Bohumín Town Hospital	Bohumín	Moravian-Silesian
AGEL Hospital Podhorská	Bruntál	Moravian-Silesian
AGEL Hospital	Český Těšín	Moravian-Silesian
Frýdek-Místek Hospital	Frýdek-Místek	Moravian-Silesian
Havířov Hospital	Havířov	Moravian-Silesian
Mining Hospital Karviná	Karviná	Moravian-Silesian
Karviná Hospital and Clinic	Karviná	Moravian-Silesian
Associated Medical Facility Krnov	Krnov	Moravian-Silesian
AGEL Hospital	Nový Jičín	Moravian-Silesian
Odry Town Hospital	Odry	Moravian-Silesian
Silesian Hospital in Opava	Opava	Moravian-Silesian
Orlová Hospital	Orlová	Moravian-Silesian
Faculty Hospital Ostrava	Ostrava	Moravian-Silesian
Ostrava City Hospital	Ostrava	Moravian-Silesian
AGEL Hospital Ostrava-Vítkovice	Ostrava	Moravian-Silesian
AGEL Hospital Podhorská	Rýmařov	Moravian-Silesian
AGEL Hospital Třinec-Podlesí	Třinec	Moravian-Silesian
Třinec Hospital	Třinec	Moravian-Silesian

== See also ==
- Healthcare in the Czech Republic
