= Otto Schück =

Czech medical doctor (1926–2025)

- Born: 26 August 1926; Prague, Czechoslovakia
- Died: 21 October 2025 (aged 99)
- Education: Charles University
- Scientific career
- Fields: Nephrology, internal medicine
- Workplaces: Charles University; University of Manchester; IKEM

Otto Schück (26 August 1926 – 21 October 2025) was a Czech medical doctor and professor of internal medicine. His research and teaching helped define nephrology in Czechoslovakia and the Czech Republic. He was among the founders of the Czech Society of Nephrology, served as its president, authored widely used textbooks, and remained a long-active consultant and teacher.

== Life and education ==
Schück was born in Prague on 26 August 1926. He graduated from the Medical Faculty of Charles University in Prague in 1950 and received a PhD at the same school in 1956. He was appointed associate professor in 1965 and full professor in 1988 at Charles University. In 1965 to 1966, he undertook a research fellowship at the University of Manchester in the laboratory of S. W. Stanbury, work that seeded later studies in mineral metabolism.

Schück died on 21 October 2025, at the age of 99.

== Career ==
After graduation, Schück briefly served in Plzeň at the department of the internist Karel Bobek before moving in 1950 to the 1st Department of Medicine at the General University Hospital in Prague, where he remained until 1961. In that period, he produced early studies that mathematically formulated plasma clearance and the calculation of area under the plasma concentration curve after administration of a substance, concepts that later became foundational in drug pharmacokinetics. He also investigated resorptive properties of the urinary bladder and the intrarenal distribution of labeled substances using autoradiographic methods.

In 1961, he joined newly established research institutes in Krč district of Prague that evolved into the Research Institute of Experimental Therapy, moved in 1970 to the 3rd Internal Research Base of the Institute for Clinical and Experimental Medicine, and from 1980 worked in IKEM's Nephrology Department, where he also served as head. During the mid-1960s he developed work in calcium metabolism that identified a pronounced calciuric effect of Furosemide compared with other diuretics, and his group continued with studies on renal sodium excretion, concentrating ability, uric acid handling, and the function of residual nephrons. He advanced functional testing in nephrology culminating in the monograph Examination of Kidney Function, which appeared in Czech and later in English and Russian. He co-authored further textbooks including Nephrology for the General Practitioner and Clinical Nephrology that were used broadly by clinicians.

From the 1980s to 1995, he led the Subdepartment of Nephrology at the Institute of Postgraduate Education in Prague, while also heading the 3rd Internal Research Base at IKEM and subsequently the Nephrology Clinic. Within the professional community, he helped found the Czechoslovak and later Czech Society of Nephrology and served as its president from 1990 to 1996. He received the Jan Evangelista Purkyně Award in 1996, the Bruno Watschinger Award and prizes of the Czech nephrology and internal medicine societies. In later years, he continued to teach and consult at the Internal Medicine service of the Second Faculty of Medicine and Motol University Hospital.
