= Institute of Experimental Medicine (disambiguation) =

The Institute of Experimental Medicine is a scientific establishment in Russia founded in 1888. Institute of Experimental Medicine may also refer to the following:

- Institute of Experimental Medicine, Academy of Sciences of the Czech Republic
- Institute of Experimental Medicine, Hungarian Academy of Sciences
