= Jihlava Hospital =

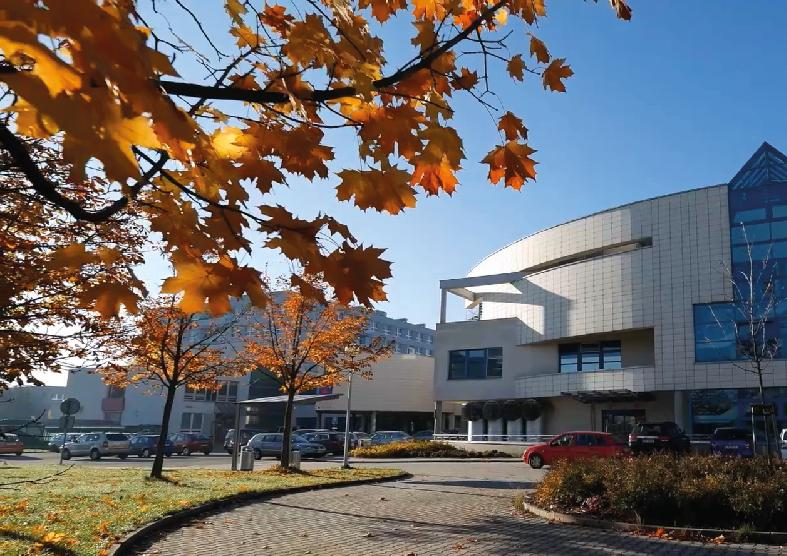
- North wing of the hospital complex

Geography
- Location: Jihlava, Czech Republic
- Coordinates: 49.399914°N 15.570175°E

Organisation
- Type: Health-care facility
- Patron: Vysočina Region

Services
- Beds: 712

Links
- Website: www.nemji.cz/en/
- Lists: Hospitals in Czech Republic

Jihlava Hospital (Czech: Nemocnice Jihlava) is a state-funded health-care facility in Jihlava in the Czech Republic. It is the largest regional hospital within Vysočina Region.

It provides the health care for both outpatients and inpatients, basic, specialized diagnostic, preventative and necessary care is also provided together with the pharmaceutical services. It carries out scientific, educational and informational activities in the health-care branch. In particular, medicament clinical evaluation is carried out and new medical technology is tested, scientific research activities are supplemented by education of health care workers, also by undergraduate and postgraduate education of health care workers and the provision of a professional library.

Jihlava Hospital has 712 beds, out of which 621 are for urgent diseases, and it provides care in 56 medical branches. It consists of 18 medical departments.

== Hospital departments ==
=== Surgical disciplines ===
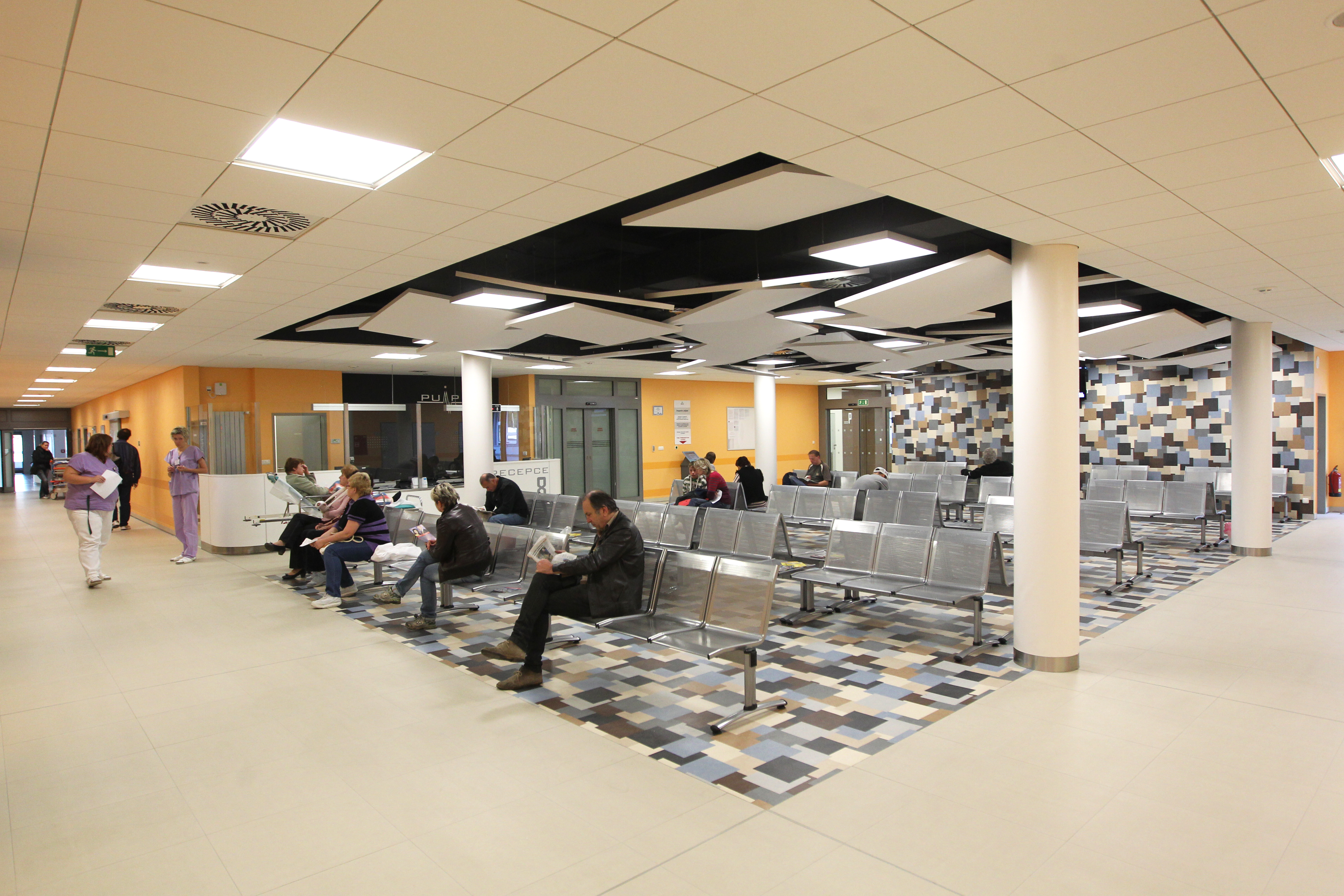
Urgent care

- Plastic surgery
- Department of Anaesthesiology and Resuscitation
- Department of Surgery
- Department of Emergency and Urgent Care
- Central operating rooms and sterilization
- Department of Gynaecology and Obstetrics
- Department of Ophthalmology
- Department of Otorhinolaryngology
- Department of Orthopaedic and Traumatology
- Department of Urology

=== Non-surgical departments ===
- Department of Infectious Diseases
- Department of Internal Medicine
- Department of Cardiology
- Department of Dermatology
- Department of Geriatric and Aftercare
- Department of Neurology
- Department of Paediatric
- Department of Oncology
- Clinical Psychologist
- Department of Rehabilitation
- Department of Pulmonary Medicine

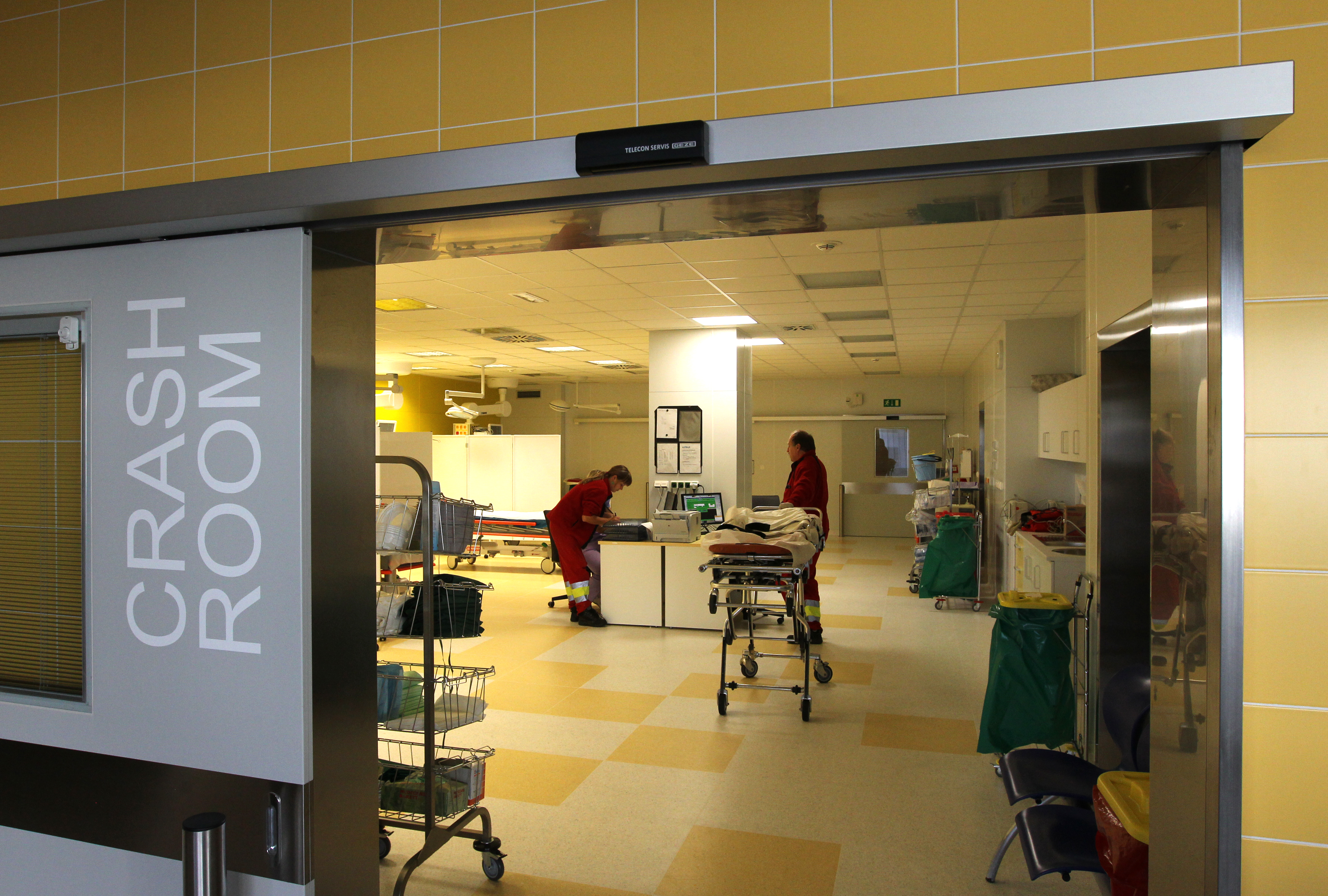
Crash room

=== Diagnostic departments ===
- Department of Haematology and Transfusion
- Department of Clinical Biochemistry, Microbiology and Immunology
- Department of Pathology
- Department of Imaging
- Department of Nuclear Medicine and PET Centre
- Department of Medical Genetics
- Department of Institutional Epidemiology

=== Logistics ===
- Department of Therapeutic Nutrition and Catering
- Department of Information and Communication Technology
- Hospital Pharmacy
- Central Dispatching of Hospital Porters

== Specialized centres ==
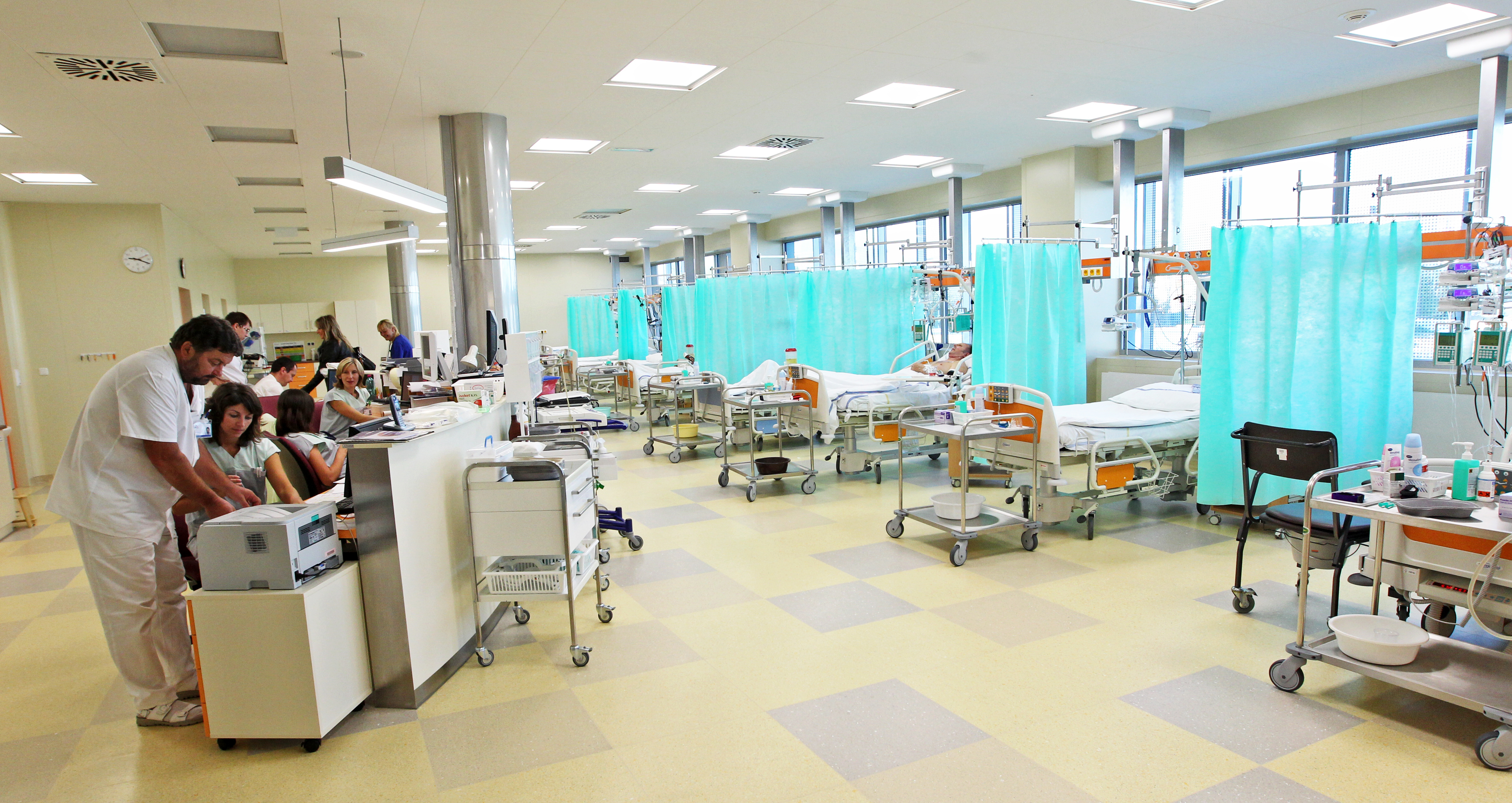
Intensive care unit

- Regional Oncology Centre - forms a comprehensive network of oncology care in Vysočina Region. The hospital offers a wide range of examination methods from laboratories to MRI scans.
- Stroke Centre - intensive care is provided in a specialised neurological ICU with eight beds. The other forty beds are for the standard care.
- Cardiovascular Centre - provides cardiovascular care including interventional cardiology. In cooperation with the Vysočina Cardiac Centre, the cardiology department provides timely and accessible modern cardiac care in the Vysočina region. The main focus of its activities is the care of patients with acute coronary syndrome and arrhythmias.
- Onco-Gynaecologic Centre - provides care for patients with serious tumours in the area of reproductive organs.

== Other centres ==
- Centre for the Intestinal-Disease Treatment (M. Crohn's and C. ulcerosa)
- Centre for the Demyelinating-Disease Treatment (MS)
- Centre for the Rheumatic-Disease Treatment
- Centre for the Severe-Psoriasis Treatment
- Centre for the Degenerative-Eye-Disease Treatment (CDE)
- Centre for the Severe-Asthma and Pulmonary-Fibrosis Treatment
- Perinatology Centre for Intermediate Care
- Genetic Counselling centre

== History ==
Jihlava Hospital was established as a public institution on the base of the charter approved by the resolution N. 074/02/2003/ZK of the Vysočina Region Council on 31 March 2003 but its history is much longer. Since the 13th century, Jihlava had two hospitals. The Hospital of St. Elizabeth situated outside the fortification walls in the north part of the medieval town and the Hospital of St. George which stood further to the north on the so-called Hospital suburb (Špitálské předměstí). Separately, on the place of today piano factory near U dlouhé stěny street there used to be a lazarette for the wonderers. It served as a quarantine place.

Only in 1751, when the first permanent army battalion settled in the town, Jihlava got its first army hospital. It was built between 1753 and 1754 in Věžní street. Due to its small size, a new army hospital was built between 1785 and 1786 on today Tolstého street (today Police-Academy building).

In the 1830s the city felt a growing need to build a new and modern hospital, which was finally built on the place granted by Václav Dobřenský the owner of Plandry manor. The new hospital was built next to the army facility. Its foundation stone was consecrated on 5 August 1849, the new facility was put into operation on 26 November 1850. Its first chief doctors were Dr. Franz Julius Grüner (1850–69), Dr. Julius Grüner (1869–1887), Dr. Julius Pollatschek (1887–1898) and Dr. Anton Nietsch. In 1877, in the hospital garden, a new wing for infection diseases was built. The bed capacity then hit number 118. In 1879 the hospital was connected to the town water system.

In 1899, a new surgery-ward construction started, in 1902 it was put into operation. Since 1928 the building was used for Department of Ophthalmology. The development of the hospital slowed down during the World War I. When Jihlava became a part of Czechoslovakia, two new hospital departments were established: Department of Internal Disease and Dermatology. On 1 July 1928 a new surgery ward was put into operation. It was a modern building consisting of six floors and two entrances, which was far ahead its time. The new wards means the increase in the number of the beds. In 1935, there were 470 beds in the hospital. In 1937 Department of Otorhinolaryngology was established and in 1945 the Department of Pediatrics was newly founded.

After Second World War, the hospital became the main regional facility with MUDr. František Bradáček as a head. But from 1950s on, the area of the hospital became too small for all its departments and a completely new compound placed in the west part of the town was chosen for the construction of the new one.

=== New Hospital ===
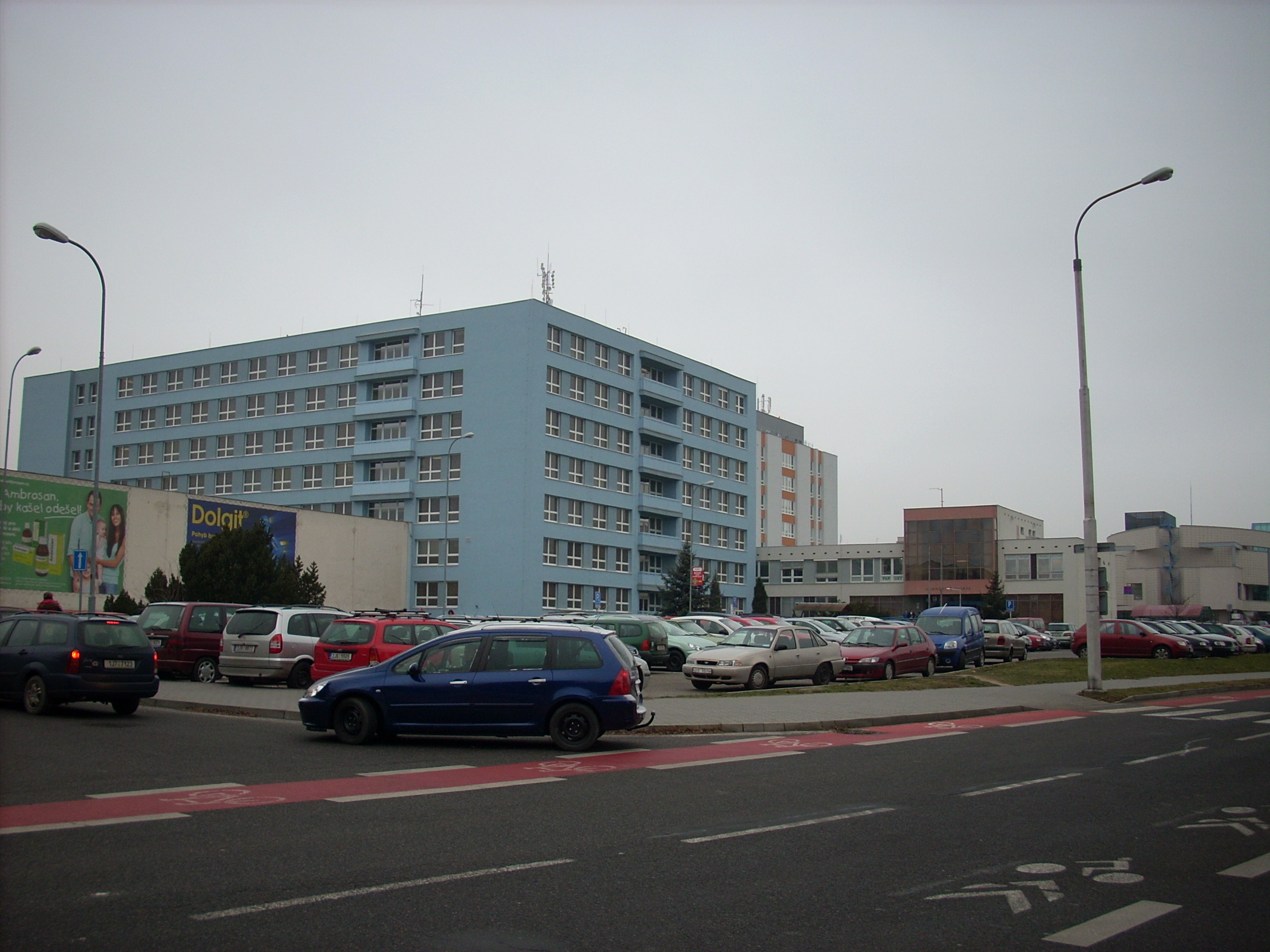
The Internal-Diseases ward built in 1983

The first wing built was for the Department of Infectious Diseases, which was put into operation in 1967. The construction site for the new hospital was situated next to the outpatient clinic, all the health services could, therefore, be at one place. In 1973 the construction of the first bigger block of the hospital – the internal ward – began. In 1972 a new Department of Radiology became independent, as its first MUDr. Jan Štěpánek was appointed. In 1979 a new Hemodialisis department was established, it was then the second largest in Czechoslovakia. In 1980 the ARO department for the inpatients was opened. In 1981 a ward for diagnostic medical branches was built and in 1982 the operation of a non-stop emergency in the region was established.

In 1983 the new wing for the internal medical branches was finished. Between the existing wing for diagnostic branches and this new internal ward the building for the wing of radiators was built. In 1988 another building was finished and put into operation, the department for the Long-Term-Ill patients, which offered 100 beds. In 1994 a Gynaecology-Obstetrics pavilion was opened for the patients. The departments which still operated in the area of the old hospital were then moved to the new one. In 2002, when a new pavilion for the central surgery rooms and central sterilization was opened the old hospital area was abandoned and Jihlava Hospital has been operating only in the new area since.

After al hospital departments were finally under one roof, the development could continue. In May 2005, the SANUS Assisted Reproduction Centre started its operation. In September 2007, Cardio-Centre Vysočina started its operation in the modified premises of the hospital. Since 2008, it has been working closely with the newly established cardiology department of the hospital. In cooperation with the College of Polytechnics Jihlava, the hospital has become a teaching centre of the Department of Health Studies for the bachelor's degree programmes in midwifery and general nursing. In July 2010, the hospital obtained the status of the centre for stroke treatment. In 2019, the hospital was awarded the fourth place in the competition Safe Hospital
