= Hradhouse Festival =

- Genre: Electronic music
- Locations: Boskovice, Czech Republic
- Years active: 1998–2010
- Website: Hradhouse portal

Festival Hradhouse was an annual festival of electronic dance music that took place in Boskovice, near Brno, Czech Republic. The festival was a fixture on the Czech music scene and in the process has grown from a small summer underground party to an event of international importance. It was a significant event for the region as it reinforced the region's importance as a major centre for dance music as opposed to the more established scene in Prague.

== History ==
In 1998 the festival took place for the first time at the Buchlov Castle, set deep in the woods. It was the first time that dance music and effects had been used in such a setting and it set a trend for future events. In the early days the line up of Czech DJs attracted just 1000 people but since then the number of guests has steadily increased. The Czech dance scene was from then on the start of its journey and the organisation of a party at the castle was a mini-revolution in its own right.

Since then a number of new parties have taken place in the area and Hradhouse has had to defend its position. The organisation gradually become more professional, and prestige sponsors were recruited and at the same time, guest capacity was increased. In 2001 the festival moved to the bigger castle at Boskovice, which is closer to Brno.

The first performing DJ guest from outside the Czech Republic was DJ Heaven from the UK club Cream. She was brought from the airport to the festival in 1999 in an old car and, as she was wearing high-heel shoes, she had to be carried by the promoters, because there were too many holes on the path to the main stage. In later years the number of international guests increased and gradually a large number of legendary DJs have performed at the Hradhouse festival, including Terry Francis (2000), Richard Sen (2001), Nils Hess, Ian Ossia (2002), Marco Bailey, Pelacha, Evil Eddie Richards (2003), Chris Liebing (2004), Cristian Varela, Felipe, Chris Cowie (2005), Michel De Hey, Fergie, Justin Robertson (2006), Adam Beyer, Marco Carola, and Sébastien Léger (2007).

The last year was held in 2010.

== See also ==
- List of electronic music festivals
