= Moshe Spitzer =

Israeli publisher and literary editor

Moshe Spitzer משה שפיצר
- Born: 8 July 1900; Boskovice, Moravia, Austria-Hungary
- Died: 16 November 1982 (aged 82)
- Education: Kiel University
- Known for: Typography
- Movement: Israeli art

Moshe (Moritz) Spitzer (Hebrew: משה (מוריץ) שפיצר; 8 July 1900 – 16 November 1982) was an Israeli illustrator, graphic artist, typographer, font designer, Hebrew bibliophile and Israeli publisher. He was an Indologist by training.

== Biography ==
Moshe Spitzer was born on 8 July 1900 in the town of Boskovice, in Moravia, Austro-Hungarian Empire (today the Czech Republic) to a traditional Jewish family. From a young age he was active in Zionist movements, and was involved in establishing a branch of the Blue and White youth movement in his hometown.

Spitzer studied Indology (Sanskrit and ancient Indian culture) at the universities of Berlin, Frankfurt, Kiel and Vienna, and in 1926 he received a doctorate in this discipline from the University of Kiel. After his studies, he worked between 1927-1928 as a research assistant at the Prussian Academy of Sciences (Akademie der Wissenschaften) in Berlin. In this framework, he researched a philosophical manuscript in Sanskrit from the 2nd or 3rd century AD, found on the Silk Road (in the Turpan Commission, in the east of Xinjiang province in eastern China) - the oldest journal of its kind found so far. During World War II, many of the 1,000 fragments of the manuscript were lost, and the text survives only in Spitzer's transcript. Since Spitzer was the first to study the manuscript, it is named after him: "Spitzer Manuscript" (German: Spitzer-Handschrift). In 1930 he was the editor of the children's section of the "Jüdische Rundschau". Then, between the years 1932–1934, he was a research assistant to Martin Buber. Between the years 1934-1938 he was the director of Schocken Books in Germany. As part of this position, he maintained extensive correspondence with many writers and poets, including Shmuel Yosef Agnon, Else Lasker-Schuler, Uri Zvi Greenberg, and others. In 1934, he approached Agnon with a proposal to create an anthology about the High Holy Days. Agnon accepted the proposal, and the anthology, "Yamim Nora'im", was published in 1937. In 1939 he immigrated to Eretz Israel and settled in the Rehavia neighborhood in Jerusalem.

Spitzer passed away in Kfar Saba on November 16, 1982.

=== Tarshish ===
In 1939, he founded the bibliophilic book publishing house "Tarshish" to publish the best classical literature of the world in Hebrew, paying meticulous detail to the publication in terms of the quality of the paper, the graphic design, the font and the printing. Moshe Spitzer translated for the publication from the German language and personally worked on the graphic design of the books and the design of their covers.

=== Font design ===
One of Spitzer's pioneering works was the design of suitable letters for Hebrew printing. In the 1940s he assisted in the development of the fonts "Bezalel" and "Romma", in the development of the font "David" (together with Itamar David), and the font "Hatzvi" (together with Zvi Hauzman). The printing house of "Tarshish", "Jerusalem Letters" ("Utiot Yerushalayim") was used as a laboratory for testing the new fonts.

In addition, Spitzer conducted studies on the design of Hebrew fonts, both historical studies and practical studies, which to this day form the broadest theoretical basis for the field. Thus, for example, he explored the possibilities for an emphatic script in Hebrew, which lacks tools such as italics ("italics"), the possibilities offered by the ancient patterns and manuscripts and by the modern technologies for creating readable and pleasant decorations and titles and more. The font work done by Spitzer was much acclaimed as can be seen in the Penrose Journal of 1972.

== Family ==
Spitzer was married to Pepa Hammerman, born in Drohobych in 1903, and father of three: Daniel Yosef, Amitai and Esther Yehudit.

== Education ==
- 1922–1926: Kiel University, Department of Oriental Studies

== Teaching ==
- 1926 Royal Prussian Academy of Sciences, Research assistant.
- 1932 Assistant to Martin Buber in the German translation of the Hebrew Bible
