= 2025 Motol hospital bribery =

Fraud in the Czech Republic

2025 Motol hospital bribery is a bribery, subsidy fraud, damage to EU financial interests, and money laundering affair. Miloslav Ludvík director of Prague’s Motol Hospital (the largest medical facility in the Czech Republic), was dismissed immediately by Health Minister Vlastimil Válek on 24 February 2025, after being charged for those crimes. Another seventeen people have accused so far.

== Main details ==
The case involves 16–17 suspects, including Ludvík and his deputy, Pavel Budinský, linked to systematic abuse of public procurement processes for hospital construction contracts.

The alleged financial misconduct involved contracts worth over CZK 4 billion (€150 million), where suspects are accused of manipulating the deals and skimming several percent per contract to accumulate bribes totaling hundreds of thousands of euros. The fraud specifically targeted EU cohesion funding for significant projects, including the Blue Pavilion reconstruction and a €120 million oncology center that was part of the Czech National Economic Recovery Plan. The European Public Prosecutor's Office (EPPO) is overseeing the case, and the main suspects are facing potential legal consequences, including up to 12 years in prison. Further developments occurred in April 2025, when investigators seized assets exceeding CZK 100 million in connection with a corruption case at Prague's Motol University Hospital. The European Public Prosecutor's Office ordered the confiscation of luxury items, properties, and vehicles.

On 14 May 2025 Radio Free Europe reported that Montenegrin authorities have frozen the assets of Pavel Budinský.

== European aspect ==
The raid by Czech police and EPPO highlights cross-border collaboration in combating financial crimes tied to EU funds.

== Responses ==
The Kellner Family Foundation has suspended its planned CZK 500 million donation for a new oncology center at Prague's Motol University Hospital due to an ongoing corruption investigation. The foundation has expressed willingness to resume its support once the situation is clarified and is coordinating with the Ministry of Health, which understands and acknowledges the decision.
