= Healthcare in the Czech Republic =

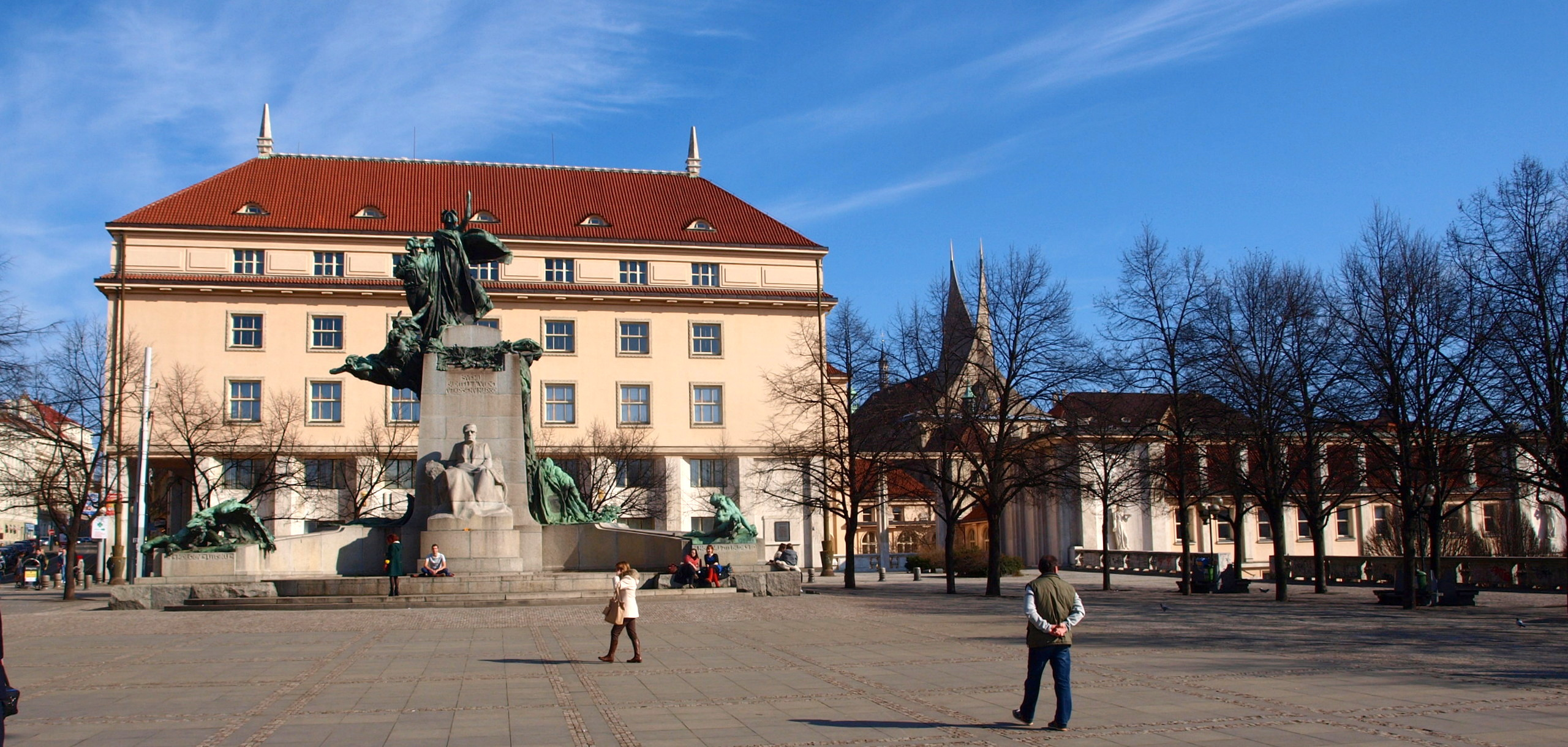
The Czech Ministry of Health building in Prague

The Czech Republic has a universal health care system, based on a compulsory insurance model, with fee-for-service care funded by mandatory employment-related insurance plans since 1992. According to the 2018 Euro Health Consumer Index, a comparison of healthcare in Europe, the Czech healthcare is ranked 14th, just behind Portugal and two positions ahead of the United Kingdom.

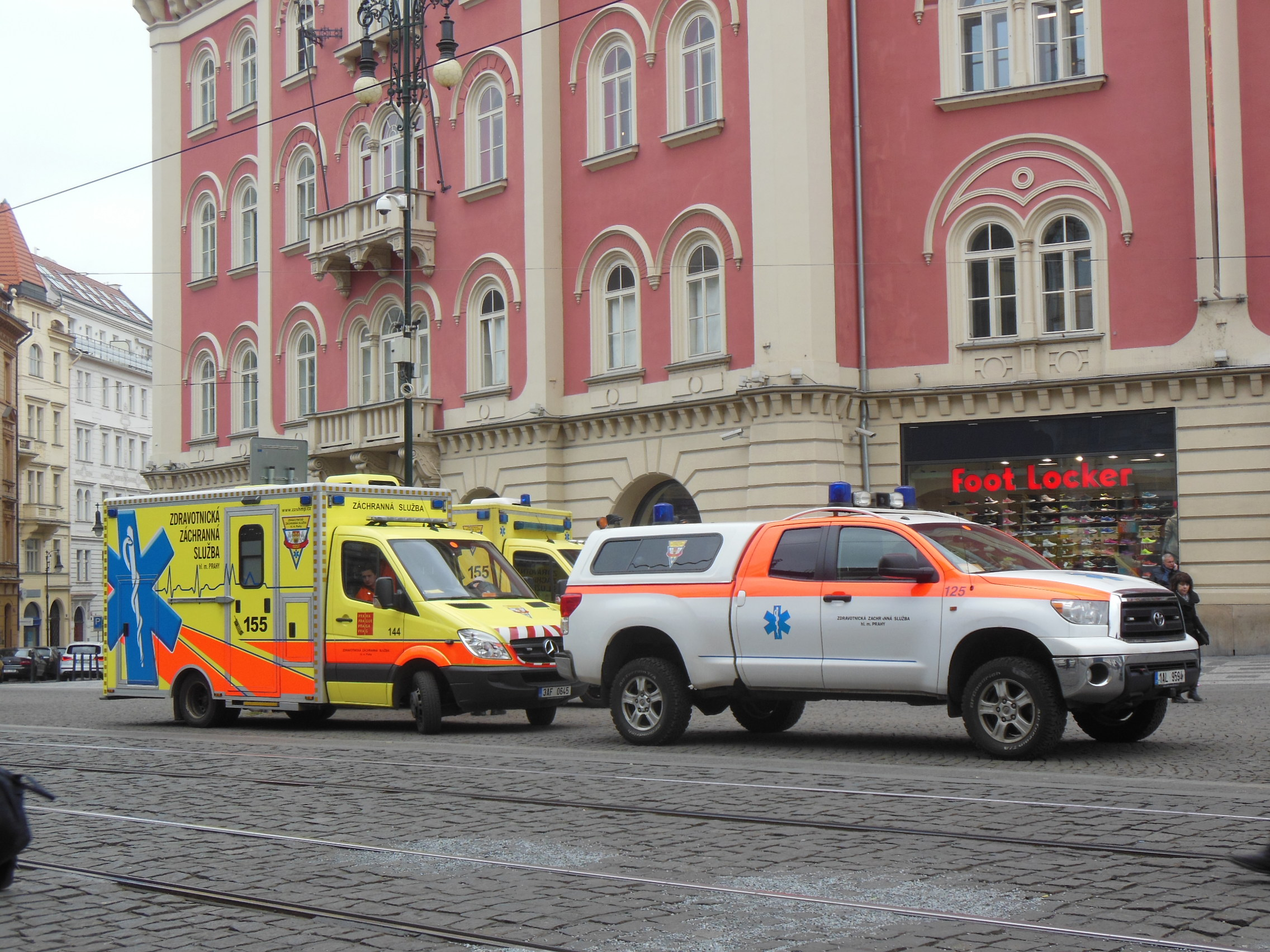
Czech ambulance vehicles

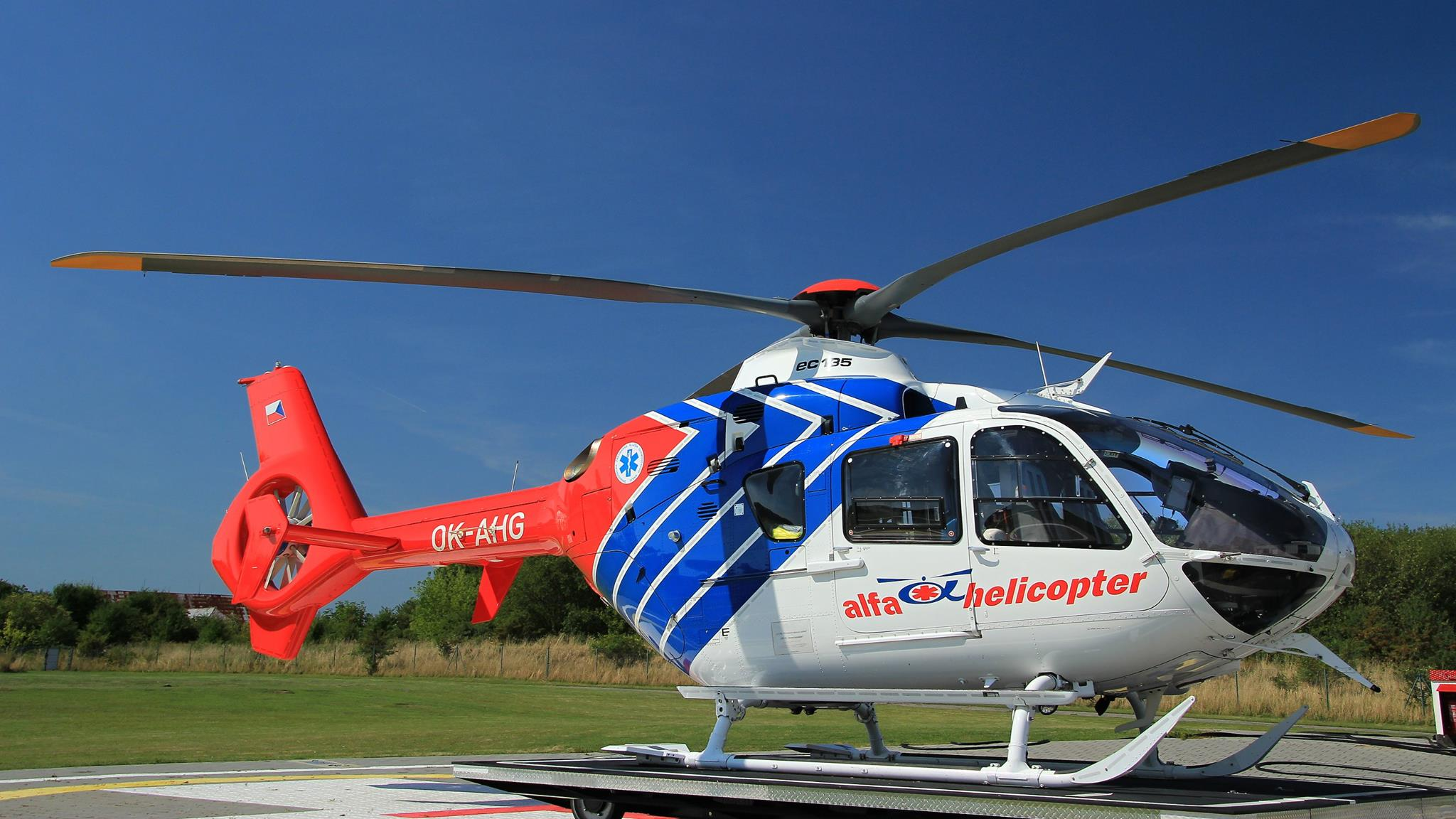
Czech ambulance helicopter

== History ==
In the 1989–1992 period, the healthcare faced substantial problems after the transition from Communist monopoly market to competitive market. From the past top-down centralized government system, the newly elected administrators enacted reforms designed to expand patient choice. From 1990 to 1998, deaths under one year of age shrank from 10.8 to 5.2 per thousand. Statistically, the Czech Republic is one of the healthiest of the central and eastern European countries, though some data points lag behind other Western European nations. The Republic has been a member of the Organisation for Economic Co-operation and Development (OECD) since 1995.

In late 2000, professors of medicine Jan Holčík and Ilona Koupilová wrote for The International Journal of Integrated Care,

There is currently considerable interest in looking to Western Europe for inspiration and a certain degree of willingness to implement, what is usually described as, the European model of health care. The context of the situation in the Czech Republic, traditions with respect to social organisation and attitudes to health and health issues, and also the economic situation of the country, will all play an important role and pose many specific issues when trying to implement new concepts such as a family doctor. It remains to be seen how far these new concepts are effective and viable in the context of the Czech Republic.

The Czech healthcare system has a great degree of decentralization and market forces used in it compared to other European systems.

In terms of administration, the healthcare system is based on a compulsory insurance model, with fee-for-service care funded by mandatory employment-related insurance plans since 1992. User fees have subsequently been reduced by more recent governments.

== Medication ==
The service is moving towards a mandatory electronic prescribing system.

The Pharmaceuticals Act, as amended, provides that the State Institute for Drug Control collects and analyses data about pharmaceuticals present in the country and to ensure distribution of medicinal products "within two business days of receipt of an order". It appears that some parts of the Act are unenforceable in practice.

== See also ==
- Economy of the Czech Republic
- History of the Czech Republic
- Healthcare in Europe
- List of hospitals in the Czech Republic
- Ministry of Health (Czech Republic)
