= Bulovka Hospital =

Teaching hospital in Prague in the Czech Republic

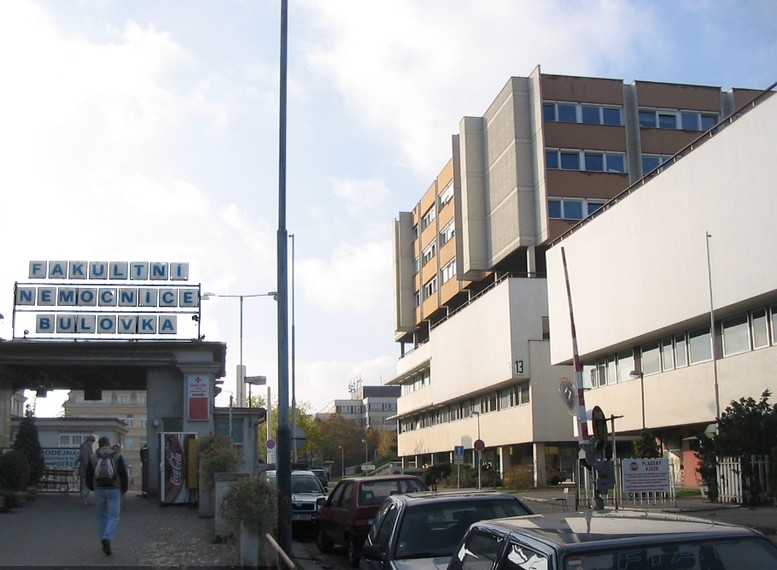
- The main entrance to the Bulovka Hospital campus

Geography
- Location: Libeň, Prague, Czech Republic
- Coordinates: 50.11547°N 14.46434°E

History
- Opened: 1931

Links
- Website: bulovka.cz
- Lists: Hospitals in Czech Republic

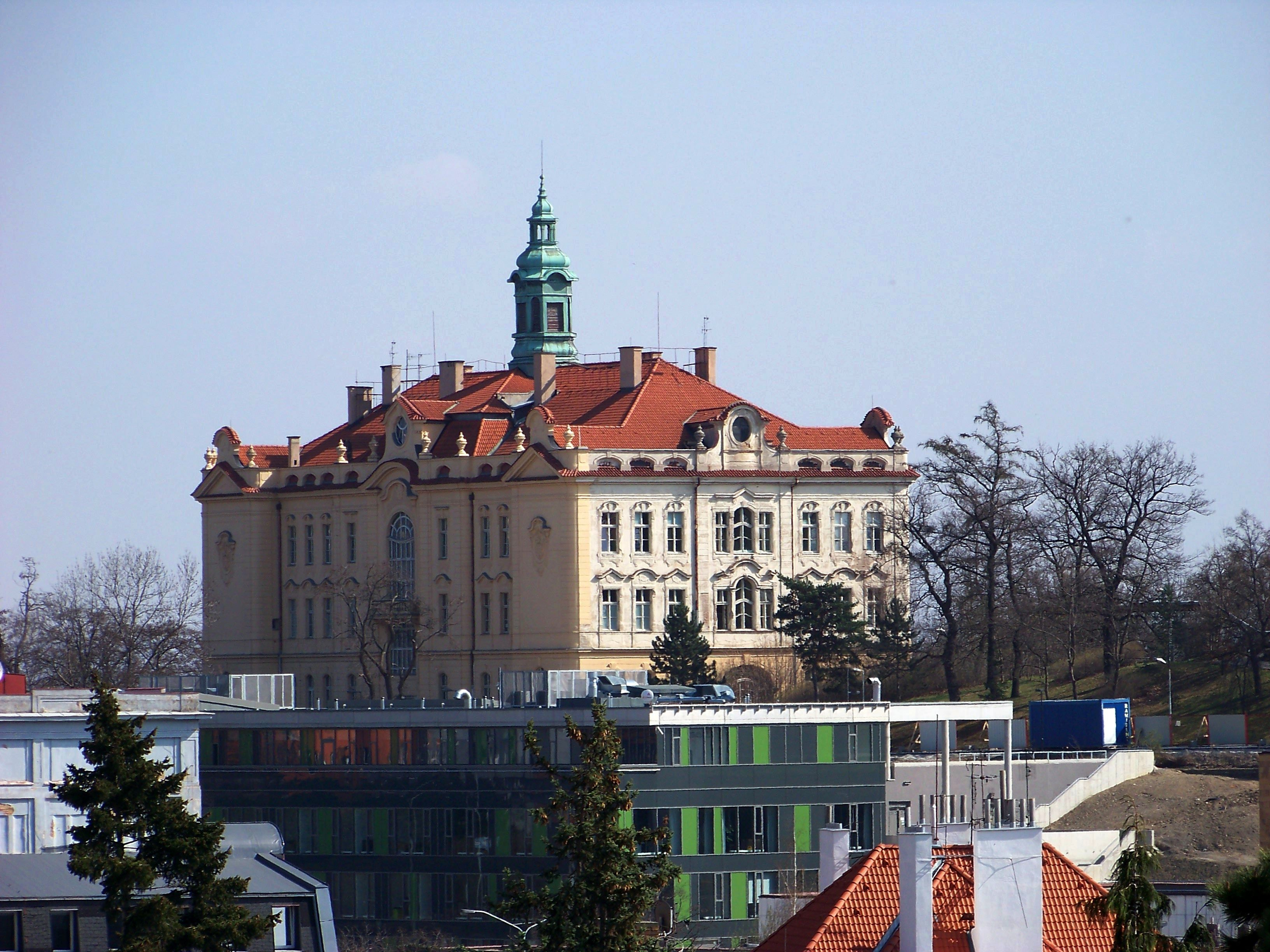
Vychovatelna

Bulovka Hospital (Czech: Fakultní nemocnice Bulovka) is a large teaching hospital complex in Prague, situated on a hillock adjoining the White Rock in Prague 8 - Libeň near the defunct homestead of Bulovka. The most striking building in the complex is the hospital's famous neo-Rococo building called Vychovatelna.

== See also ==
- Motol University Hospital, another major teaching hospital complex in Prague
