= Hermann Wassertrilling =

Austrian rabbi and Hebraist

Hermann Wassertrilling, or (Hebrew: Tzvi Hirsch ben Natan Wassertrilling; born in Boskowitz, Moravia) was an Austrian Hebraist who flourished in the 19th century.

He officiated as teacher in the Jewish school of Hotzenplotz, Silesia, circa 1850; he served as rabbi of Bojanowo, Provinz Posen. The following is a list of his works, all published at Breslau:

== Literary works ==
- "Hadrat Elisha'" (1857), an epic poem in 9 cantos, describing the life of the prophet Elisha, and giving also a brief history of contemporary kings;
- "Nezer Hamudot" (1860), an epic poem in 8 cantos, being a history of Daniel and his contemporaries under the reign of the Babylonian, Median, and Persian kings until the return of the Israelites to Jerusalem, and the building of the Second Temple;
- "Mattenat Nahali'el" (part i., 1860; part ii., 1868), a collection of legends from the Talmud, Midrash, and the midrashic commentaries, arranged in verse in the order of the weekly lessons;
- "Torat ha-Berit" (1869), a treatise in reply to a question on circumcision addressed to the synod of Leipzig by Max Engel (July, 1869).
