= Institute for Clinical and Experimental Medicine =

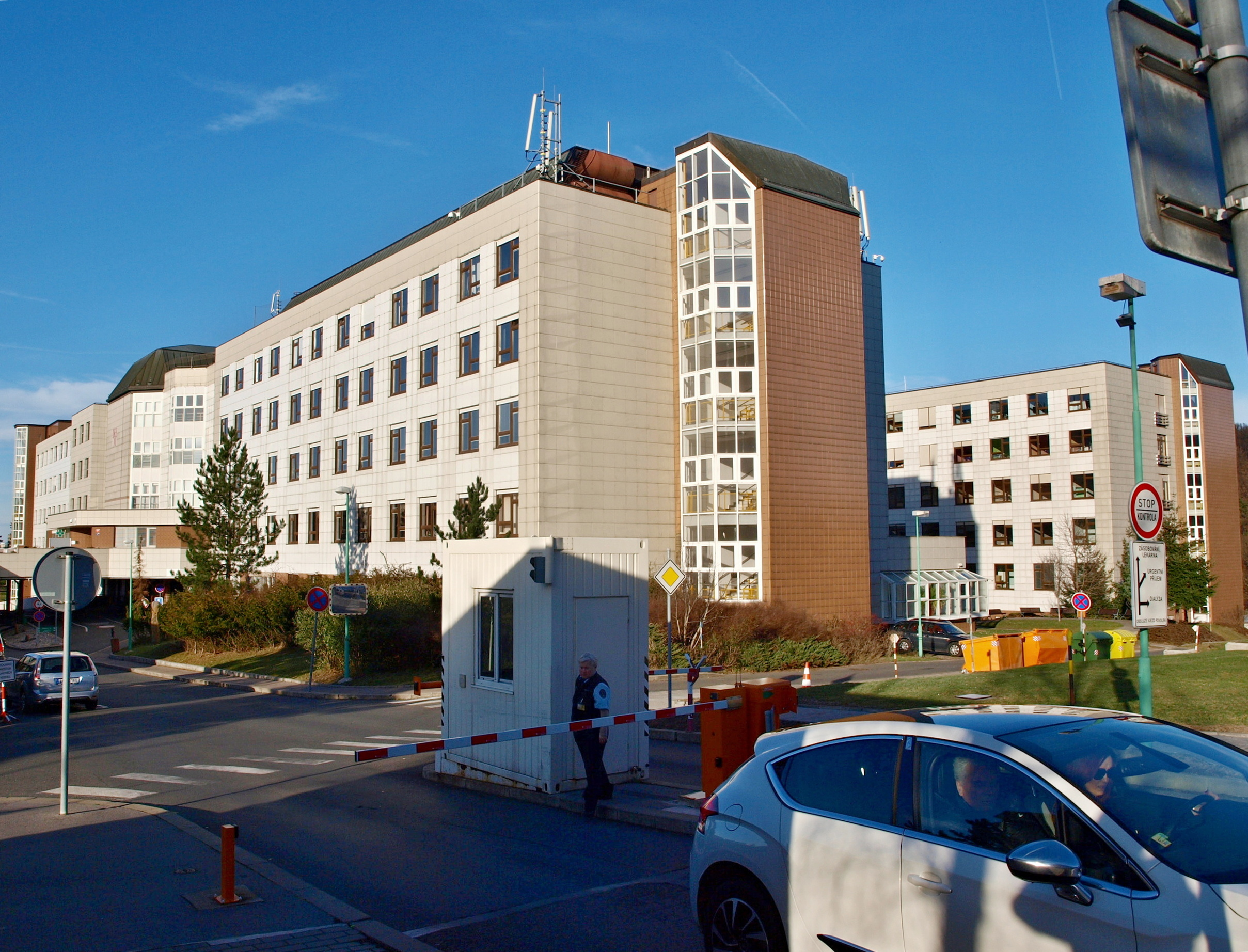
- IKEM in 2015

Geography
- Location: Prague 4, Czechia
- Coordinates: 50°1′22.03″N 14°27′46.82″E

Organisation
- Type: research and clinical hospital

Services
- Beds: 312 (2020)

History
- Founded: 1971

Links
- Website: ikem.cz/en

The Institute for Clinical and Experimental Medicine (Czech: Institut klinické a experimentální medicíny – IKEM) is the largest medical research and clinical hospital in Czechia, located in Prague–Krč. Established in 1971 as a part of the nearby Thomayer University Hospital, it is directly managed by the Ministry of Health. The institute focuses on the treatment of cardiovascular diseases, organ transplantation, diabetology, and metabolic disorders.

As of 2020, IKEM was made up of three specialized centers, eight departments, 15 specialized departments, and laboratories. It had around 1,450 staff members and a total of 312 beds, of which 83 were in intensive care units. Roughly 70% of all transplants in Czechia took place at IKEM, and as of 2019, it was the largest transplant center in Europe, transplanting 540 organs to 486 patients.

== See also ==
- Institute of Experimental Medicine, Academy of Sciences of the Czech Republic
