= Plandry =

- Municipality
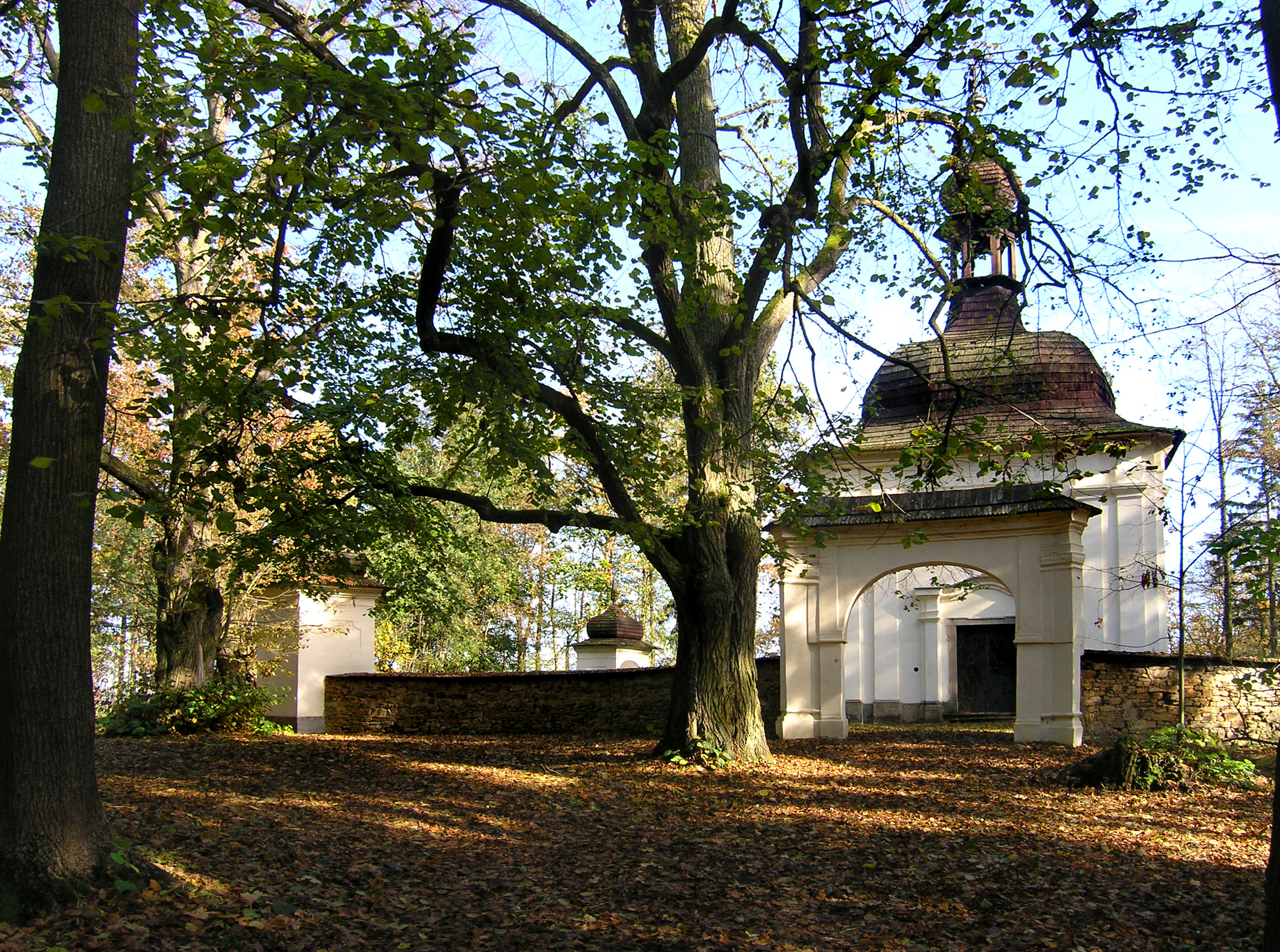
- Chapel of Saint John of Nepomuk

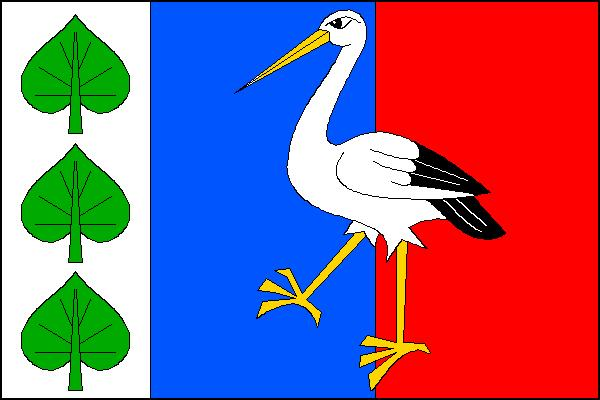
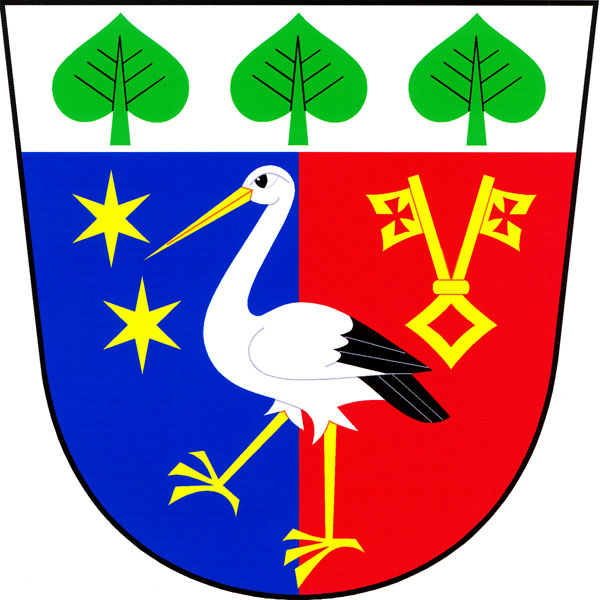
- Flag Coat of arms

- Location in the Czech Republic
- Coordinates: 49°25′12″N 15°32′18″E
- Country: Czech Republic
- Region: Vysočina
- District: Jihlava
- First mentioned: 1654

Area
  - Total: 1.82 km^{2} (0.70 sq mi)
- Elevation: 522 m (1,713 ft)

Population (2026-01-01)
  - Total: 185
  - Density: 102/km^{2} (263/sq mi)
- Time zone: UTC+1 (CET)
  - Summer (DST): UTC+2 (CEST)
- Postal code: 588 41
- Website: www.plandry.cz

Plandry (Czech pronunciation: [ˈplandrɪ]; German: Preitenhof) is a municipality and village in Jihlava District in the Vysočina Region of the Czech Republic. It has about 200 inhabitants.

== Etymology ==
The name Plandry is derived from the Brandl family, who owned the place in the mid-17th century.

== Geography ==
Plandry is located about 3 kilometres (2 mi) northwest of Jihlava. It lies in the Křemešník Highlands. The highest point is at 552 m (1,811 ft) above sea level. The municipality is situated on the left bank of the Jihlava River, which forms the southern municipal border. Inside the village is a system of four fishponds, fed by a nameless brook.

== History ==
The first written mention of Lipový dvůr (a medieval manor house that is the predecessor of the village of Plandry) is from the 15th century and are preserved in the archive of the Želiv monastery, which owned the area at that time. The area was acquired by the Trčka of Lípa family during the Hussite Wars, and in 1596 it became property of the city of Jihlava. In 1630, the Brandl family became the owners of the manor house.

In 1730, the manor house was bought by Josef Ignaz Zebo of Breitenau, who called the place "Breitenhof". Around 1734, he had built a Baroque castle on the site of the manor house. In 1810, the manor was acquired by Aloisie Schirndinger of Schirnding. Her daughter Aloisie married Václav Petr II Dobrzensky of Dobrzenitz. In 1897, two thirds of the castle were inherited by Karl von Wiedersperg, one third belonged to Václav Petr III Dobrzensky of Dobrzenitz. In 1945 the castle and the manor was confiscated and became a state possession.

== Demographics ==
Historical population

Year	Pop.	±%
1869	223	—
1880	212	−4.9%
1890	206	−2.8%
1900	214	+3.9%
1910	201	−6.1%

Year	Pop.	±%
1921	185	−8.0%
1930	183	−1.1%
1950	113	−38.3%
1961	157	+38.9%
1970	137	−12.7%

Year	Pop.	±%
1980	140	+2.2%
1991	131	−6.4%
2001	160	+22.1%
2011	179	+11.9%
2021	187	+4.5%

Source: Censuses

== Economy ==
In the municipality is a photovoltaic power station on an area of over 9,000 square metres (97,000 sq ft), which has an output of 700 kWh. Next to the power station is a biogas station with installed electric power of 800 kW.

== Transport ==
There are no railways or major roads passing through the municipality.

== Sights ==
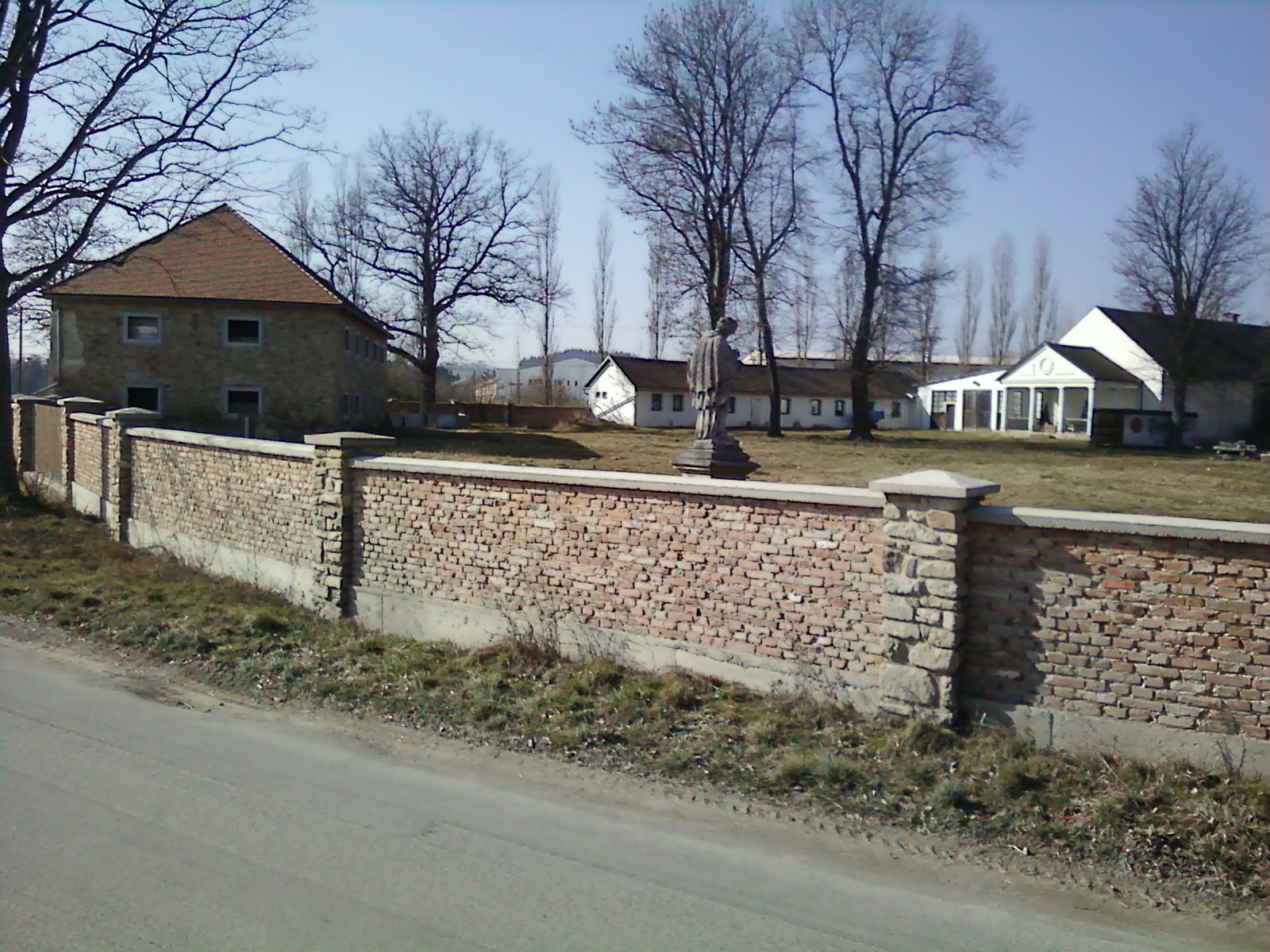
Area of the former castle

After 1945, the castle was converted into apartments and offices, and due to its poor condition, it was demolished in 1998. The adjacent farm and surrounding park with a statue of Saint John of Nepomuk from 1734 and the granary from the 18th century remain protected cultural monuments.

The Chapel of Saint John of Nepomuk was built by Josef Ignaz Zebo in the Baroque style in 1735–1739. It is a pilgrimage site. The main building of the chapel is surrounded by five niche chapels.
