= Motol University Hospital =

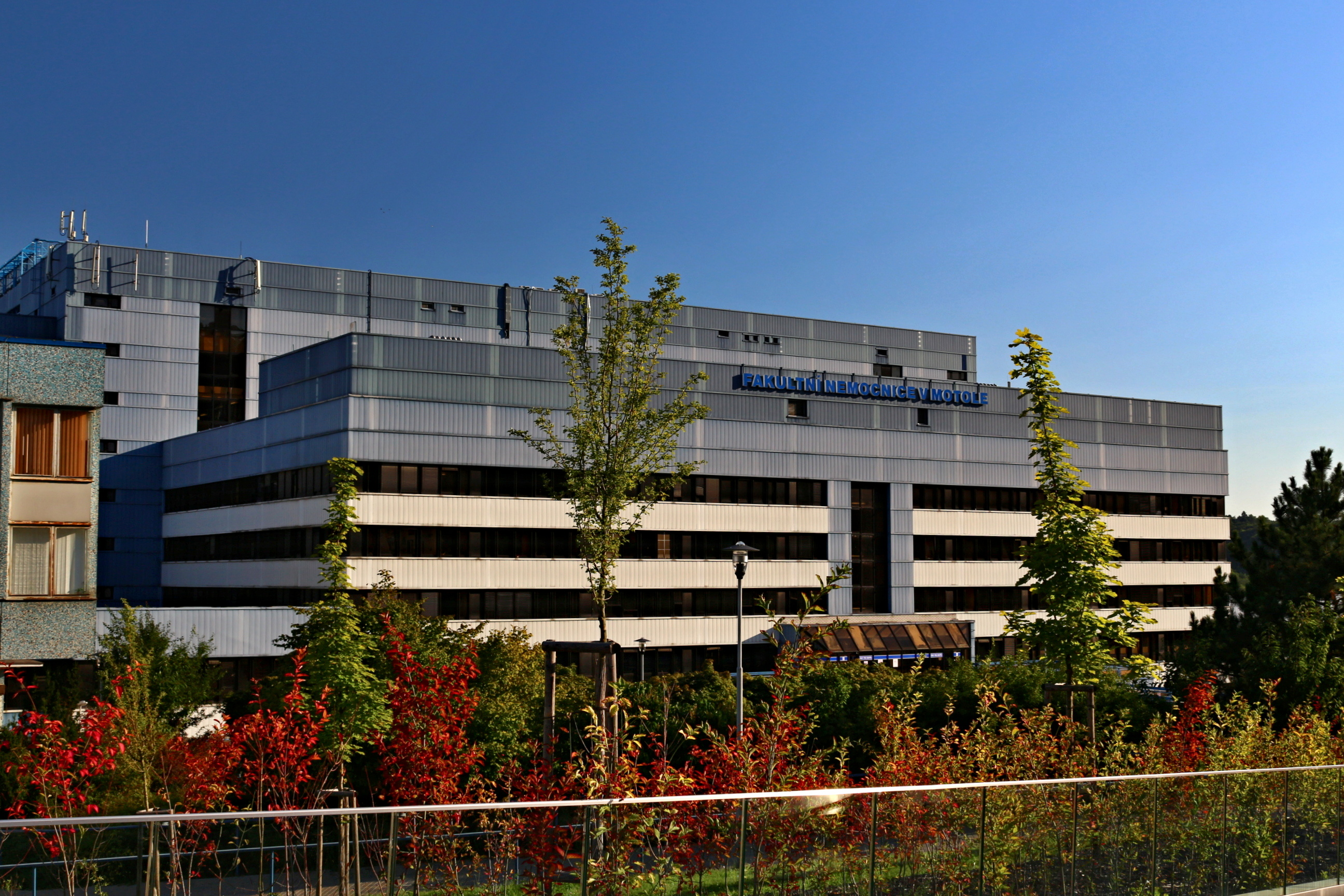
- Newer part of the hospital complex

Geography
- Location: Motol, Prague, Czech Republic
- Coordinates: 50.0740°N 14.3438°E

Organisation
- Type: Teaching
- Affiliated university: Second Faculty of Medicine

Services
- Beds: 2,410

History
- Opened: 1943

Links
- Website: www.fnmotol.cz
- Lists: Hospitals in Czech Republic

Motol University Hospital (Czech: Fakultní nemocnice v Motole) is a large teaching hospital in the Motol area of Prague. It is the largest medical facility in the Czech Republic and one of the largest in Europe. It is a major teaching base for students from the Second Faculty of Medicine, and also for some students from other faculties mainly the First Faculty of Medicine. The nearby Nemocnice Motol metro station is named after it.

This hospital has 2,410 beds. 860,000 patients are treated a year as out-patients and 70,000 as in-patients. The hospital is served by almost 5,000 staff.

== History ==
Beside the existing Motol hospital comples, a new hospital building was built in 1987-1993, the largest hospital in Europe at the time. It was designed by Yugoslavian team of architect Dušan Optrkić and structural engeener Vojislav Marisavljević.

In February 2025, the 2025 Motol hospital bribery hit the news, in which Miloslav Ludvík, the director of Motol University Hospital, was dismissed on February 24, 2025, after being charged with bribery, subsidy fraud, damage to EU financial interests, and money laundering. The case involves 16–17 suspects, including Ludvík and his deputy, Pavel Budinský, who are linked to systematic abuse of public procurement processes for hospital construction contracts.

== See also ==
- Bulovka Hospital, another major teaching hospital complex in Prague
