= Boskovice =

- Town
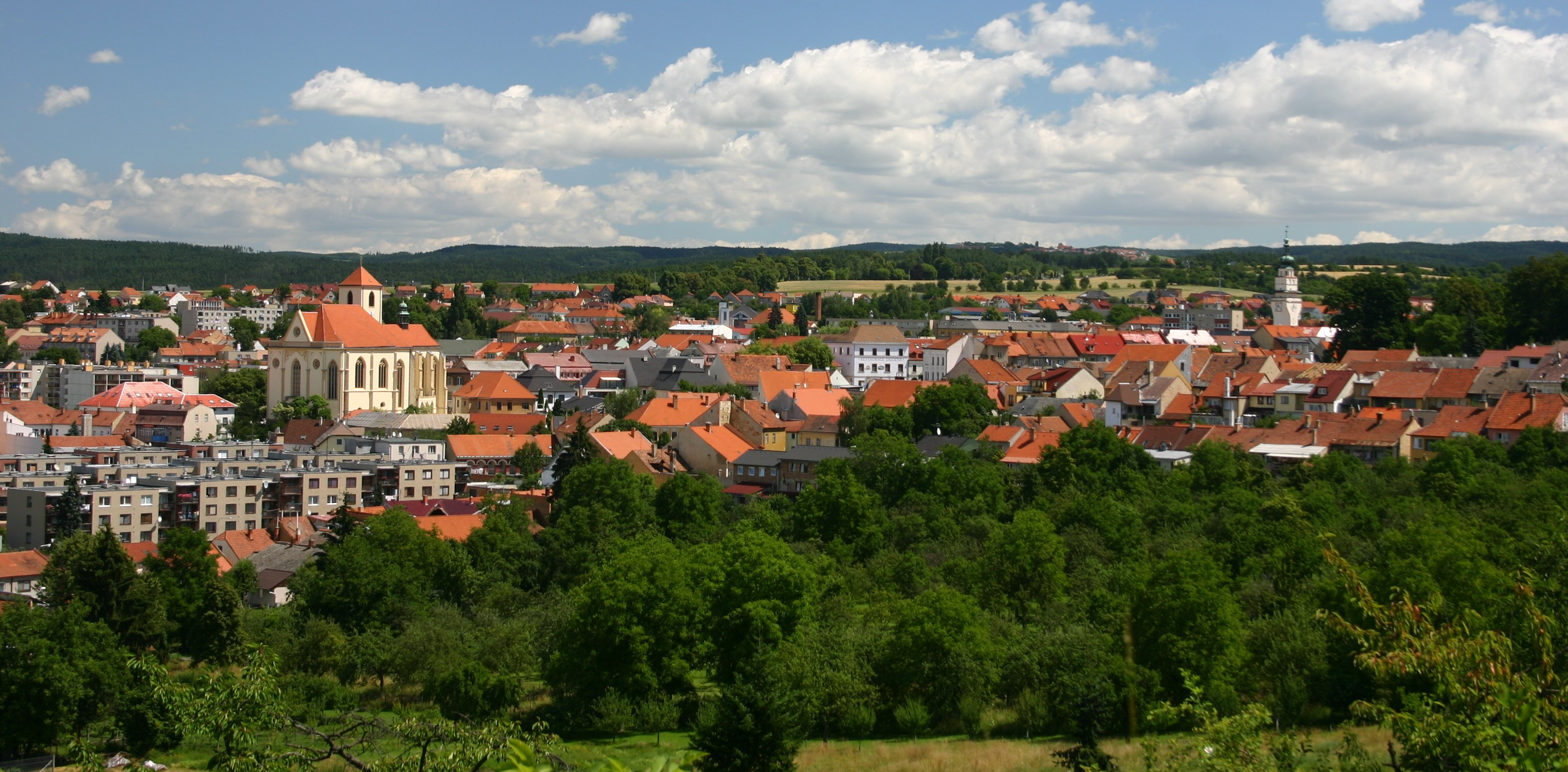
- General view of Boskovice

- Flag Coat of arms

- Location in the Czech Republic
- Coordinates: 49°29′15″N 16°39′36″E
- Country: Czech Republic
- Region: South Moravian
- District: Blansko
- First mentioned: 1222

Government
  - Mayor: Jana Syrovátková

Area
  - Total: 27.82 km^{2} (10.74 sq mi)
- Elevation: 381 m (1,250 ft)

Population (2026-01-01)
  - Total: 12,457
  - Density: 447.8/km^{2} (1,160/sq mi)
- Time zone: UTC+1 (CET)
  - Summer (DST): UTC+2 (CEST)
- Postal code: 680 01
- Website: www.boskovice.cz

Boskovice (Czech pronunciation: [ˈboskovɪtsɛ]; German: Boskowitz) is a town in Blansko District in the South Moravian Region of the Czech Republic. It has about 12,000 inhabitants.

Boskovice was probably founded in the 13th century and had one of the largest Jewish communities in Moravia. The area of the historic town centre, Jewish quarter, Empire castle complex and Gothic castle ruin is well preserved and is protected as an urban monument zone.

== Administrative division ==
Boskovice consists of five municipal parts (in brackets population according to the 2021 census):

- Boskovice (11,026)
- Bačov (81)
- Hrádkov (212)
- Mladkov (353)
- Vratíkov (247)

== Etymology ==
The name Boskovice is derived from the personal name Bosek, meaning "the village of Bosek's people".

== Geography ==
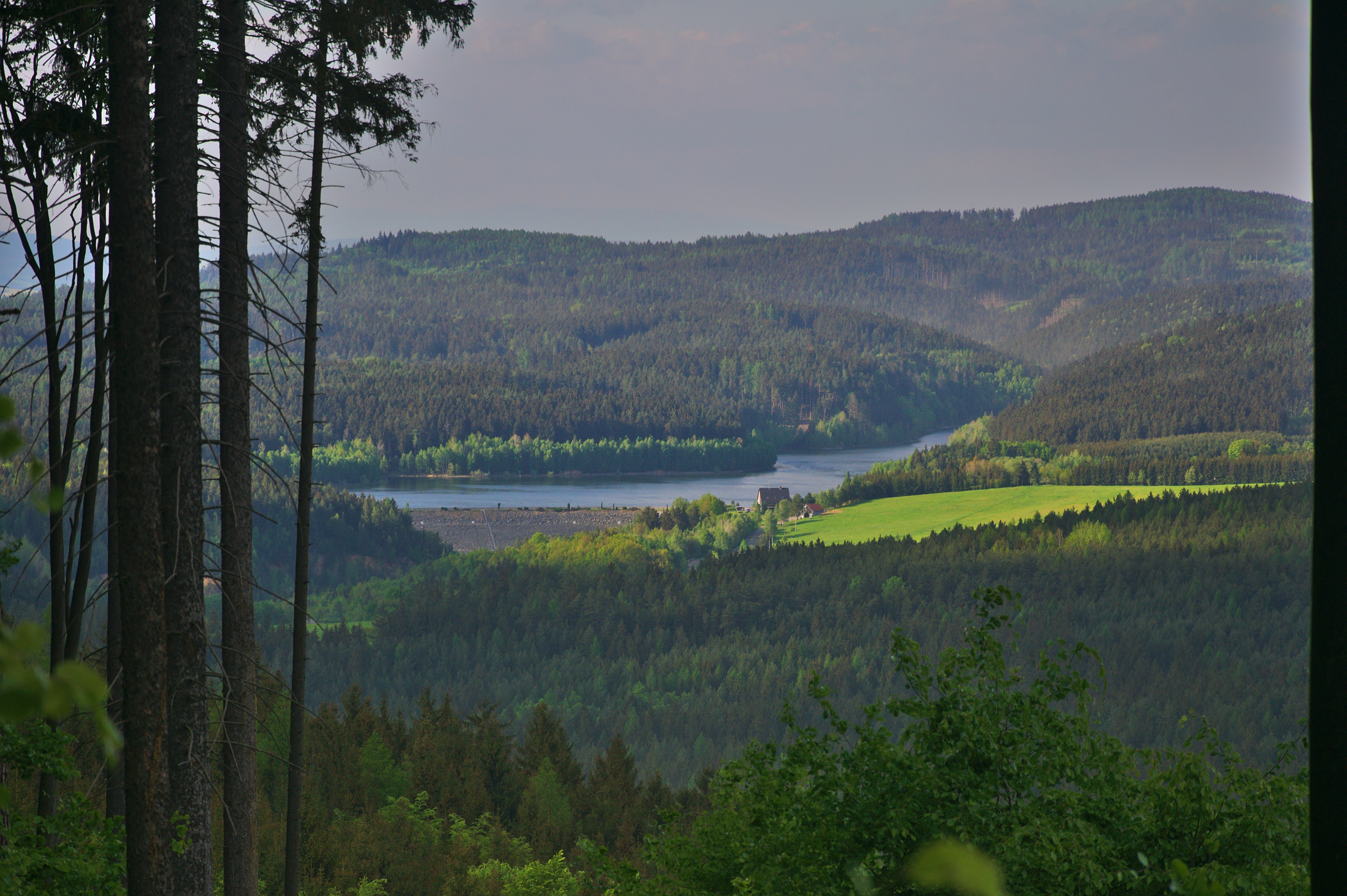
Boskovice Reservoir

Boskovice is located about 33 kilometres (21 mi) north of Brno. It lies on the border of the Boskovice Furrow and Drahany Highlands. The Boskovice Reservoir is largely located in the municipal territory. The reservoir lies on the river Bělá, which flows through the eastern part of the town and the southern part of the territory.

== History ==
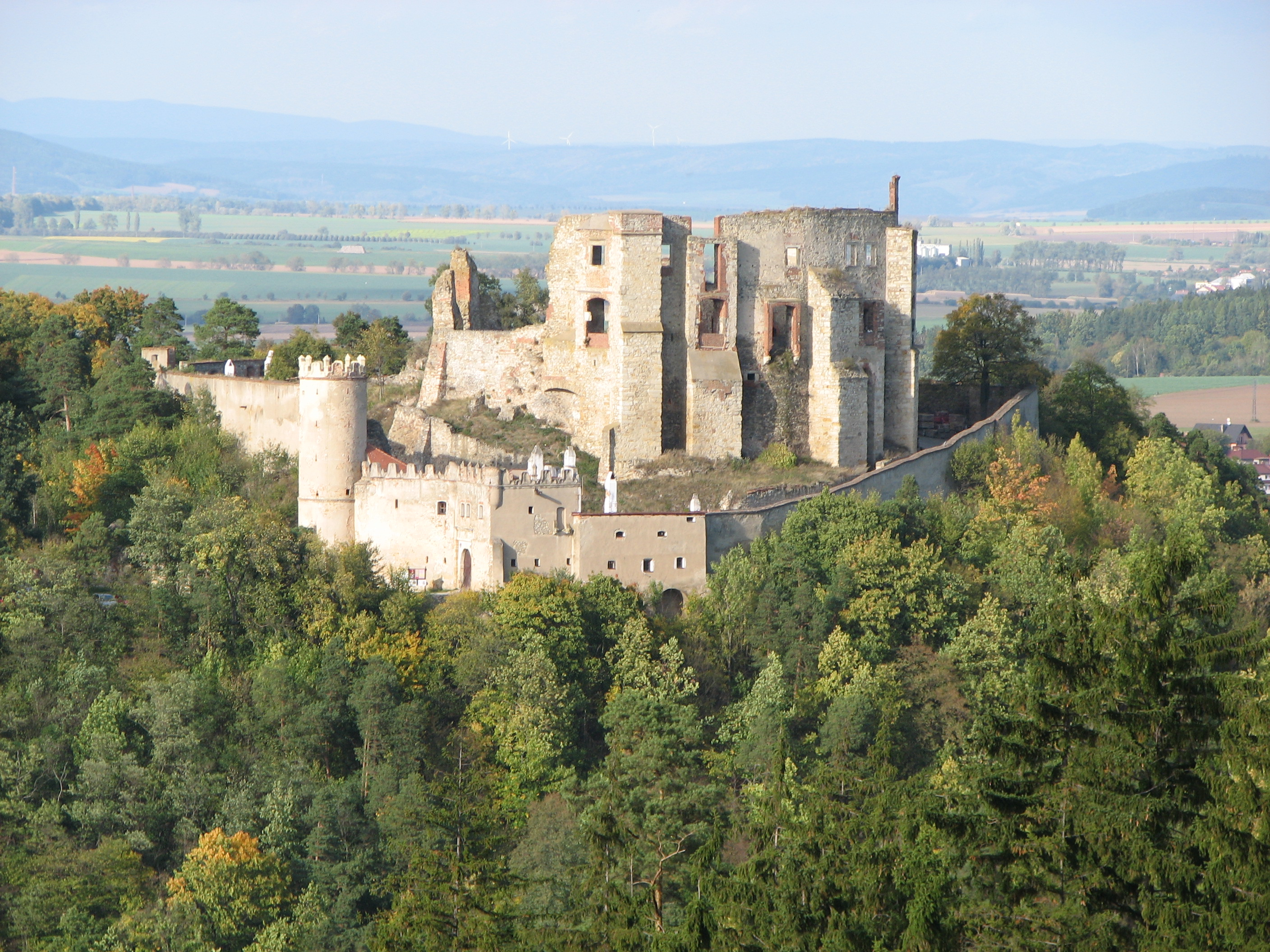
Ruin of the Gothic Boskovice Castle

Boskovice was probably founded in the 13th century as a market village. The first written mention of Boskovice is from 1222, when the lord Jimram of Boskovice was listed as a witness in a deed of the King Ottokar I of Bohemia. The Boskovice Castle was first mentioned in 1313.

During the reign of Maria Theresa (1740–1780), Boskovice was promoted to a town.

Boskovice used to have one of the largest Jewish communities in Moravia. The first mention of Jews in Boskovice is from 1343. After 1454, many Jews expelled from Brno came to Boskovice. In the first half of the 16th century, the Jewish community was established. A closed ghetto separated from the town with two gates was established in 1727. After 1848, The Jewish community of Boskovice has become a politically independent town with its own mayor. At its peak in 1857, more than 1,800 Jews lived here.

Until 1918, Boskovice was part of Austria-Hungary. In 1918, Boskovice became part of independent Czechoslovakia. From 1848 until 1960, Boskovice was a district town. Since 1960, it has been part of Blansko District.

== Demographics ==
Historical population

Year	Pop.	±%
1869	6,204	—
1880	6,119	−1.4%
1890	6,443	+5.3%
1900	6,547	+1.6%
1910	7,306	+11.6%

Year	Pop.	±%
1921	7,322	+0.2%
1930	7,595	+3.7%
1950	7,244	−4.6%
1961	8,235	+13.7%
1970	8,837	+7.3%

Year	Pop.	±%
1980	11,045	+25.0%
1991	11,290	+2.2%
2001	11,359	+0.6%
2011	11,502	+1.3%
2021	11,919	+3.6%

Source: Censuses

== Economy ==
Boskovice is known for the Minerva Boskovice company, manufacturer of sewing machines. It was founded in 1881. In 1997, the German company Dürkopp Adler became the majority shareholder.

== Transport ==
Boskovice is connected with Skalice nad Svitavou with a short railway of local importance.

== Culture ==
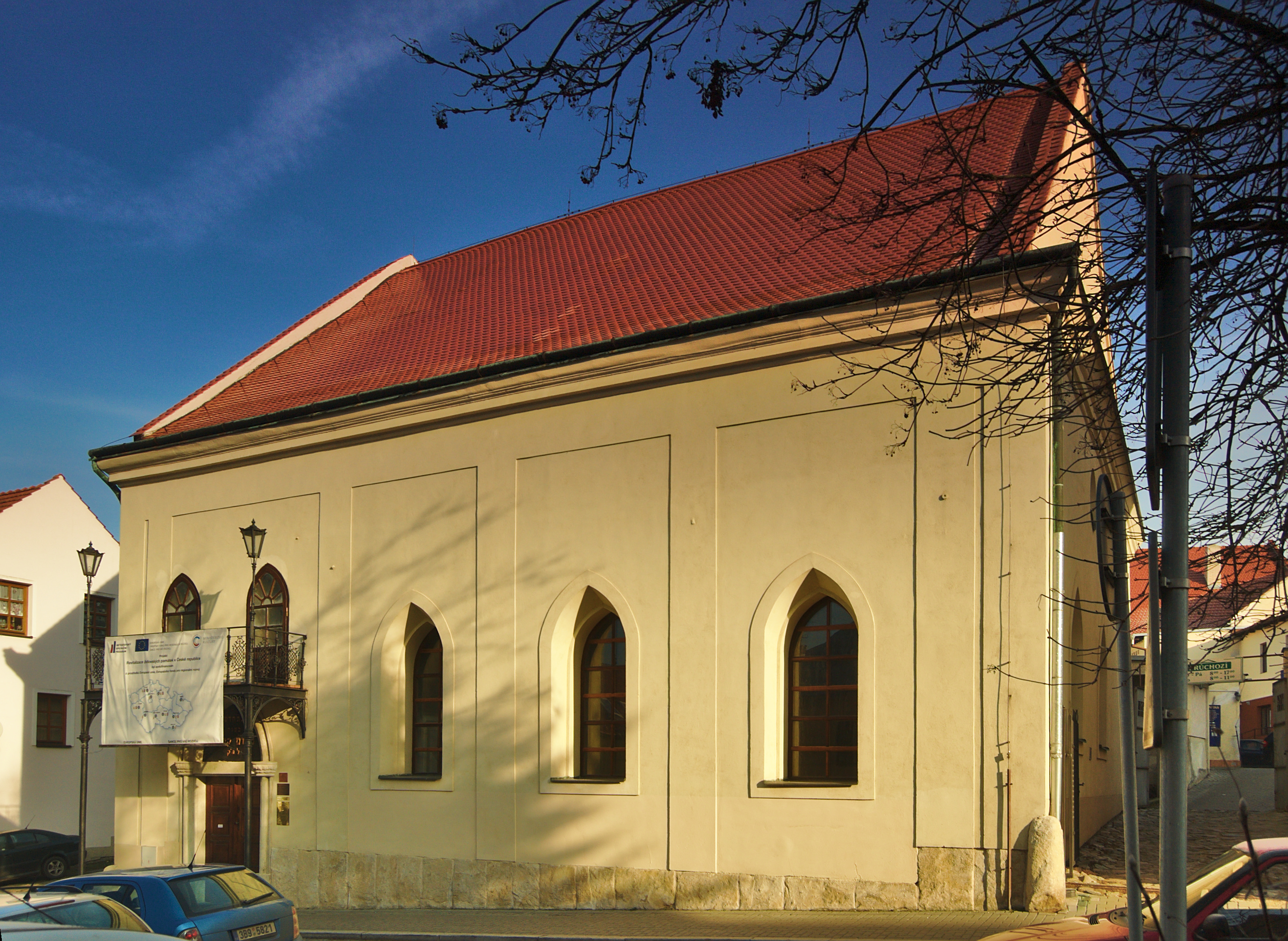
Synagogue

Since 1993, the town has hosted the Boskovice Festival, subtitled Festival for the Jewish Quarter. It is a music festival that aims to draw the public's attention to the existence of this monument and to help save it.

From 2001 to 2010, the town hosted the largest festival of dance music in Moravia, Hradhouse Festival.

== Sights ==
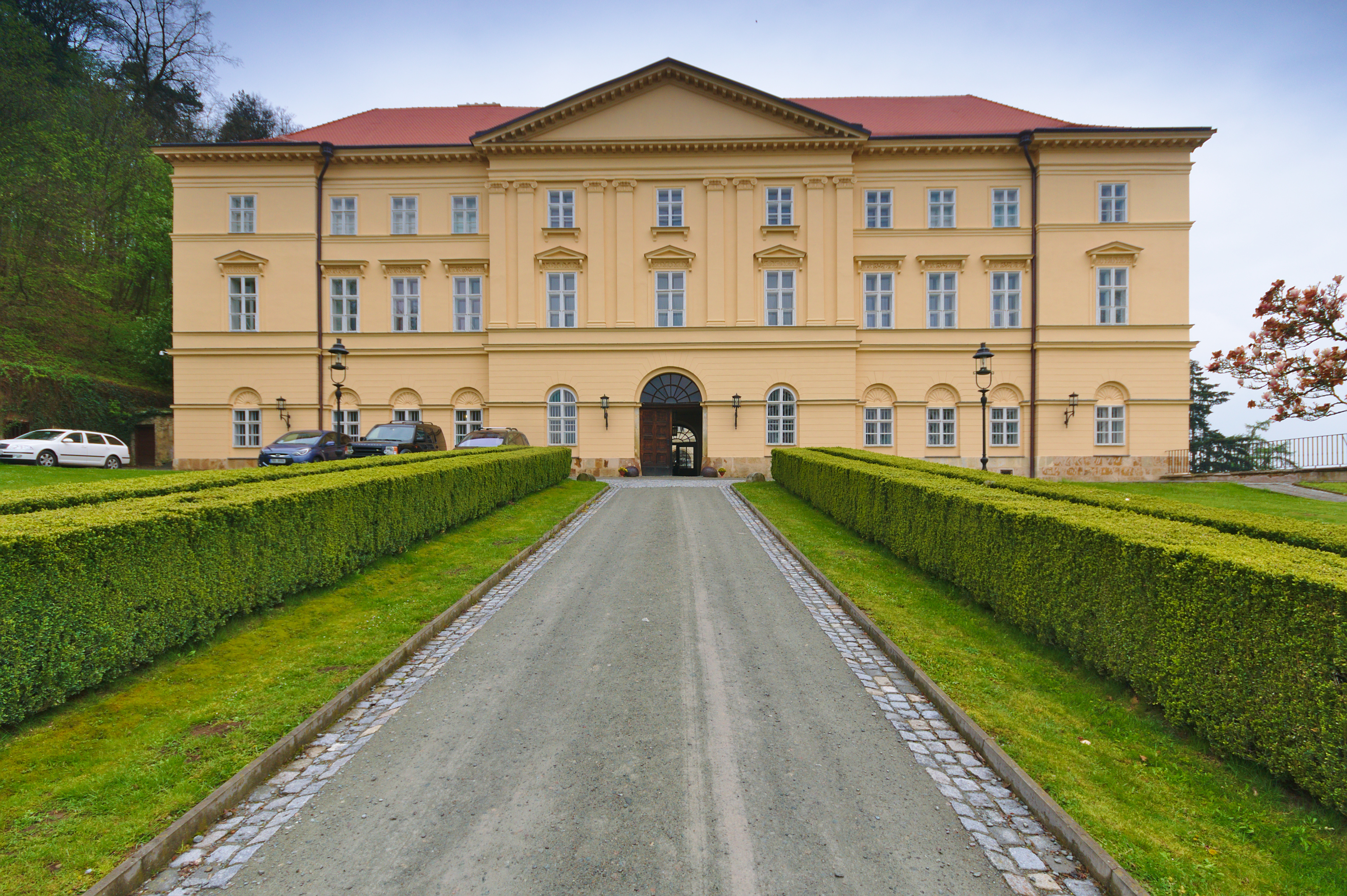
Empire Boskovice Castle

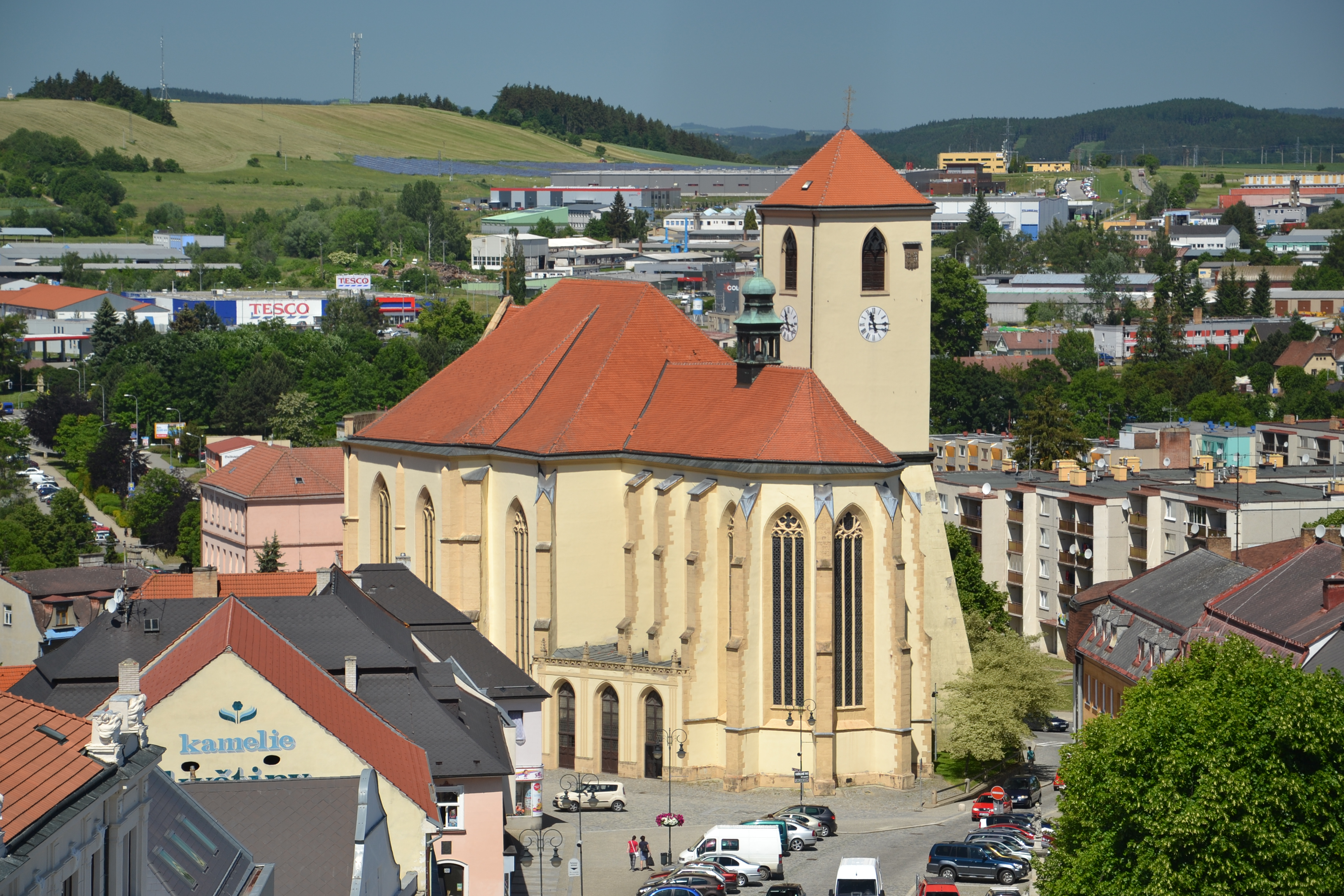
Church of Saint James the Great

The Jewish ghetto is located next to the historic centre on an area of around 5 hectares (12 acres). There are 79 preserved houses of Baroque and Neoclassical origin and one of the original gates. The Baroque synagogue was built in 1639 and later modified in Empire and neo-Gothic styles. It contains an exhibition on the history and monuments of the local Jewish community. The Jewish cemetery was founded no later than in the 16th century. The cemetery has about 2,400 tombs on 1.5 ha (3.7 acres) of area. The oldest preserved readable tomb is from 1670.

The Gothic castle in Boskovice was founded in the 13th century. In the mid-16th century, it was reconstructed in the Renaissance style. In the early 18th century, several outbuildings were added, but it was soon abandoned, and in the 1830s the castle was dismantled for the construction of buildings in the town. The torso of the castle palace has been preserved from the large building. A technical monument is a 26-metre (85 ft) deep well powered by a wooden pedal wheel, the only functional in the country.

The new Boskovice Castle was originally a Dominican monastery, rebuilt in 1819–1826 into an Empire residence. It is surrounded by an English park. The castle complex includes a large Neoclassical greenhouse from 1826–1829, a unique building of its type, and a neo-Gothic riding hall.

The nearby manor residence was built in 1729–1733 as the seat of the Dietrichstein family. It served its purpose until the family had the new castle built. After 1826, it served as an administrative building of the manor. Today this simple Baroque building houses the Museum of the Boskovice Region. Next to the manor residence is the original manor house. It was built in the 17th century as a complex of farm buildings.

The Church of Saint James the Great on the town square is from 1346. It was rebuilt in 1493–1527 and repaired many times, however, several parts of the original structure are preserved. The second landmark of the square is the town hall. Its current form is from the late Renaissance reconstruction in 1567. It has a 41.5-metre (136 ft) high tower.

== Notable people ==
- Moses Sofer (1762–1839), one of the leading Orthodox rabbis of European Jewry
- Hirsch Bär Fassel (1802–1883), rabbi and philosopher
- Hermann Wassertrilling (18??–1887), Austrian Hebraist
- Solomon H. Sonneschein (1839–1908), Hungarian-American rabbi
- Karel Absolon (1877–1960), archaeologist, paleontologist and speleologist
- Otakar Kubín (1883–1969), painter and sculptor
- Hermann Ungar (1893–1929), writer
- Moshe Spitzer (1900–1982), Israeli typographer and artist
- Josef Augusta (1903–1968), paleontologist and geologist
- Tomáš Špidlík (1919–2010), prelate of the Catholic Church
- Josef Koudelka (born 1938), photographer
- Pavel Kysilka (born 1958), economist
- Ladislav Maier (born 1966), footballer
- Robert Šlachta (born 1971), politician
- Yvetta Hlaváčová (born 1975), long-distance swimmer

== Twin towns – sister cities ==
Boskovice is twinned with:

- Frasnes-lez-Anvaing, Belgium
- Levice, Slovakia
- Prnjavor, Bosnia and Herzegovina
- Rawa Mazowiecka, Poland

== Gallery ==
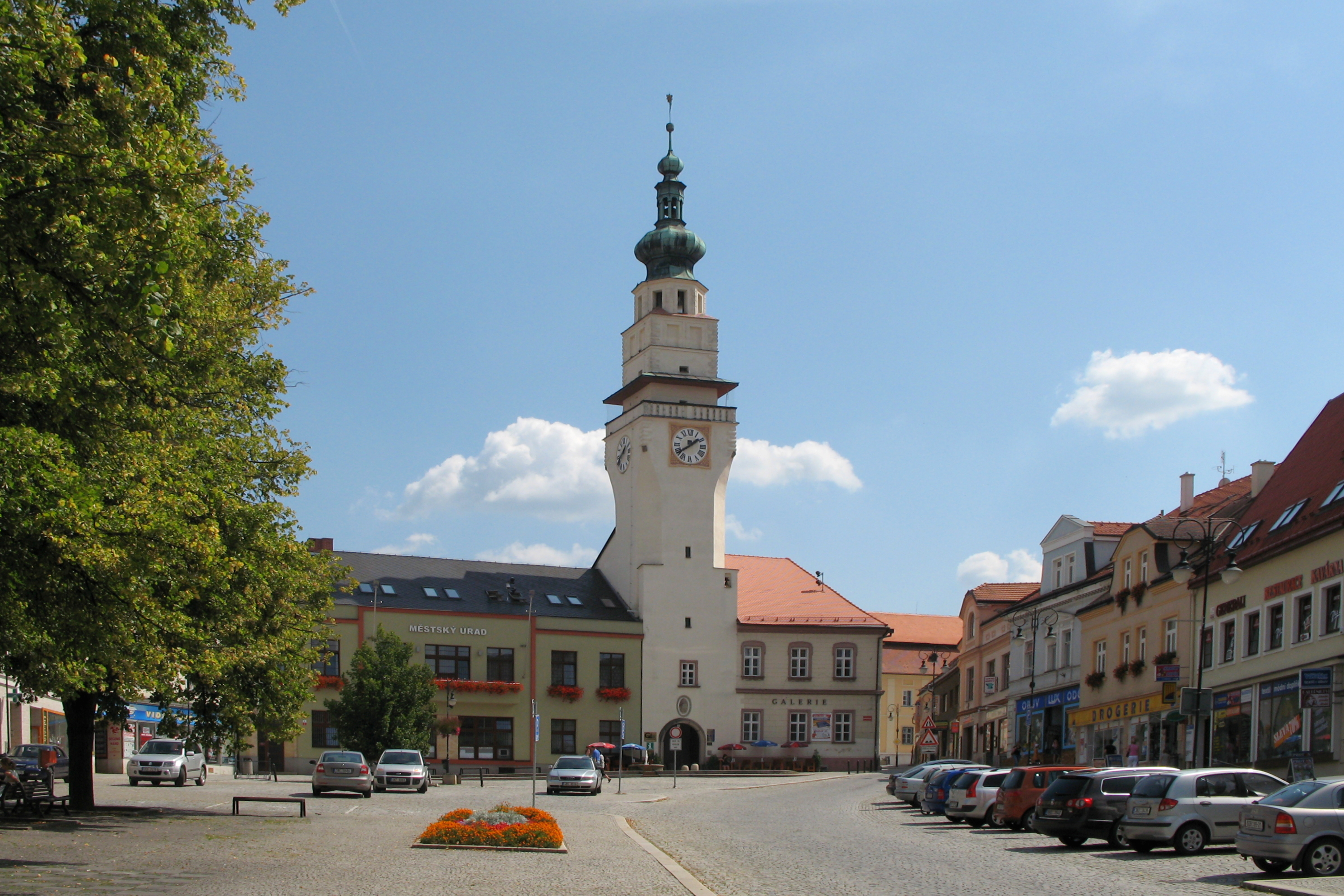
Town hall on the square Masarykovo náměstí

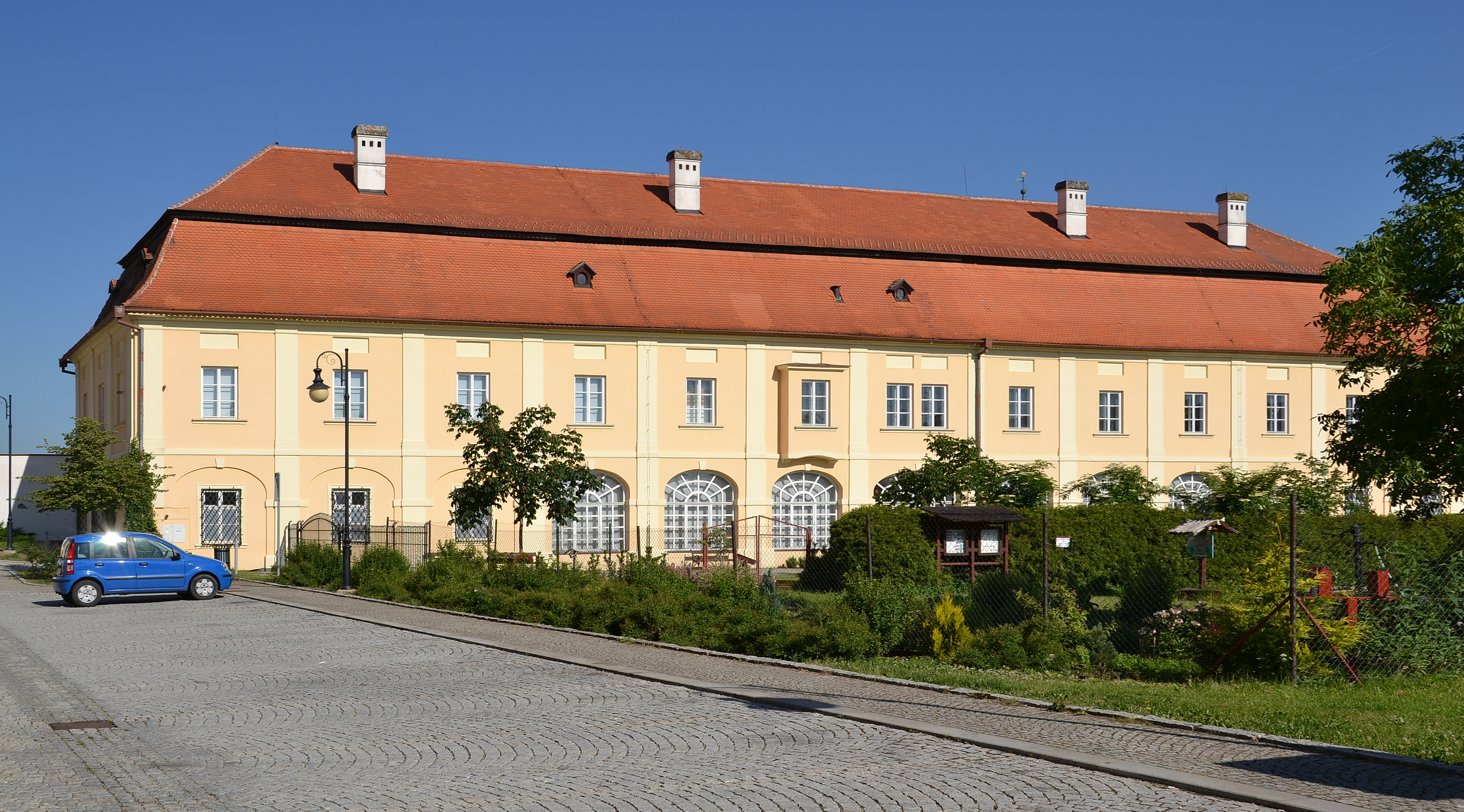
Museum of the Boskovice Region

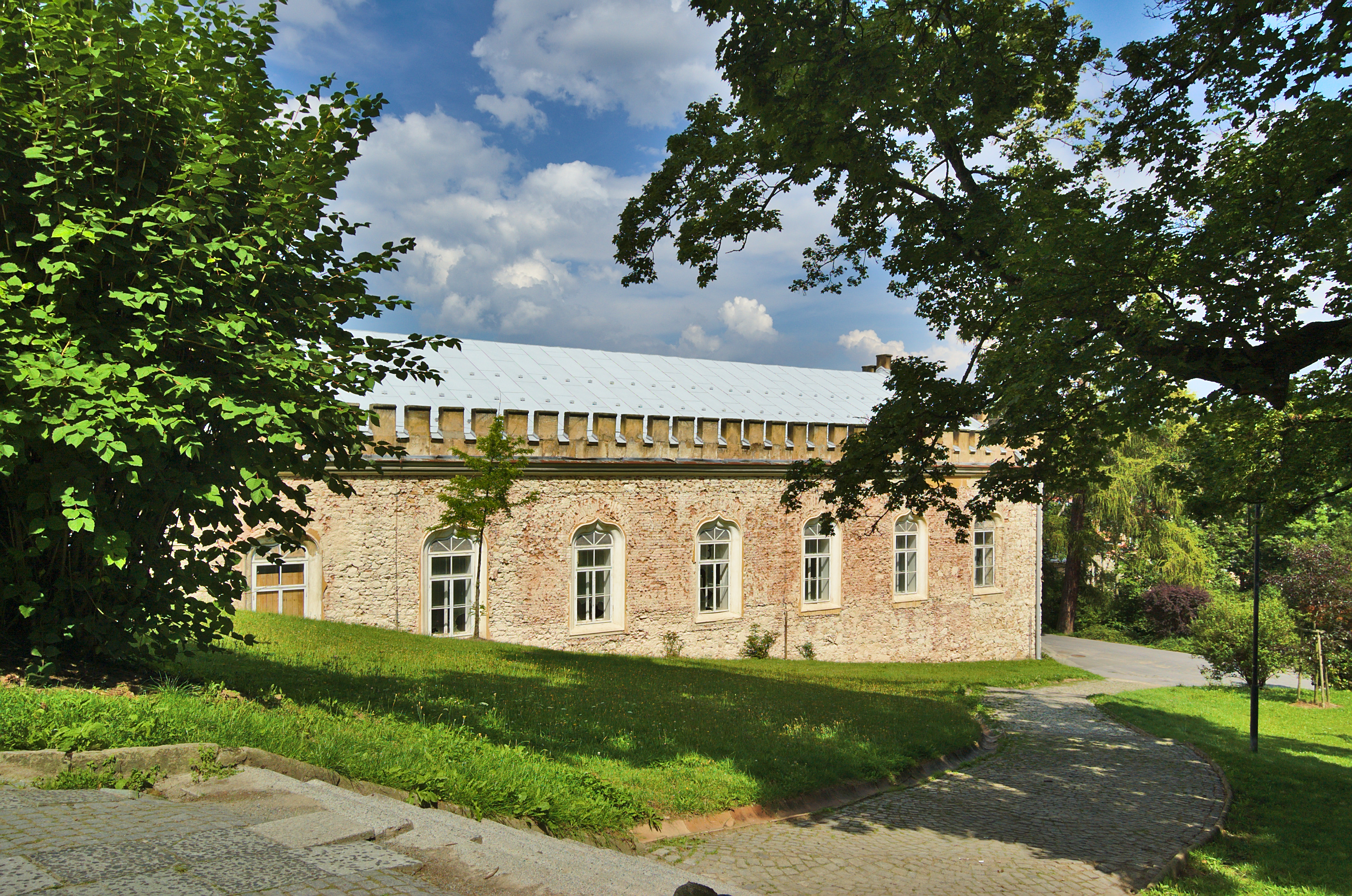
Riding hall

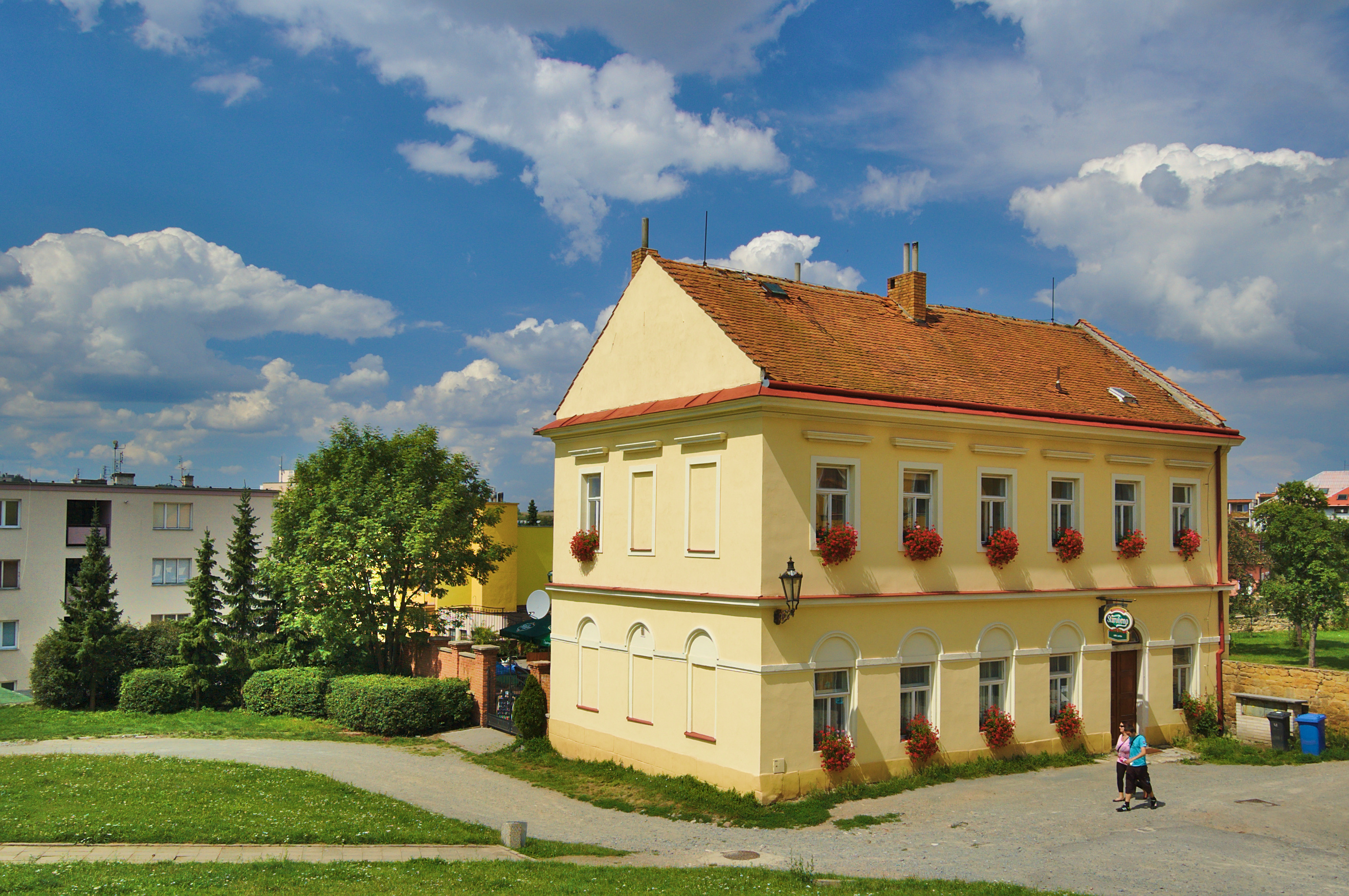
Jewish house

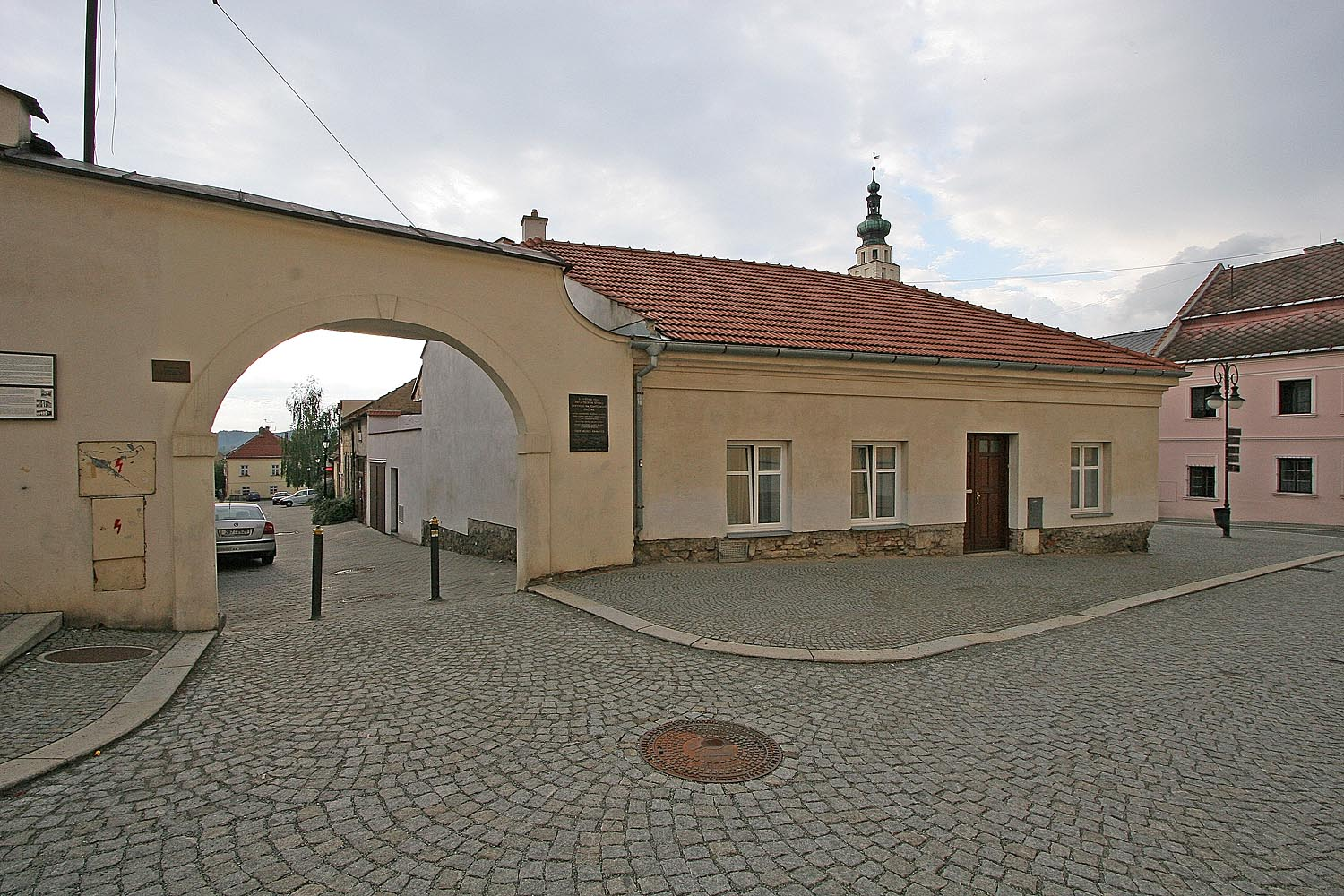
Gate to the Jewish ghetto

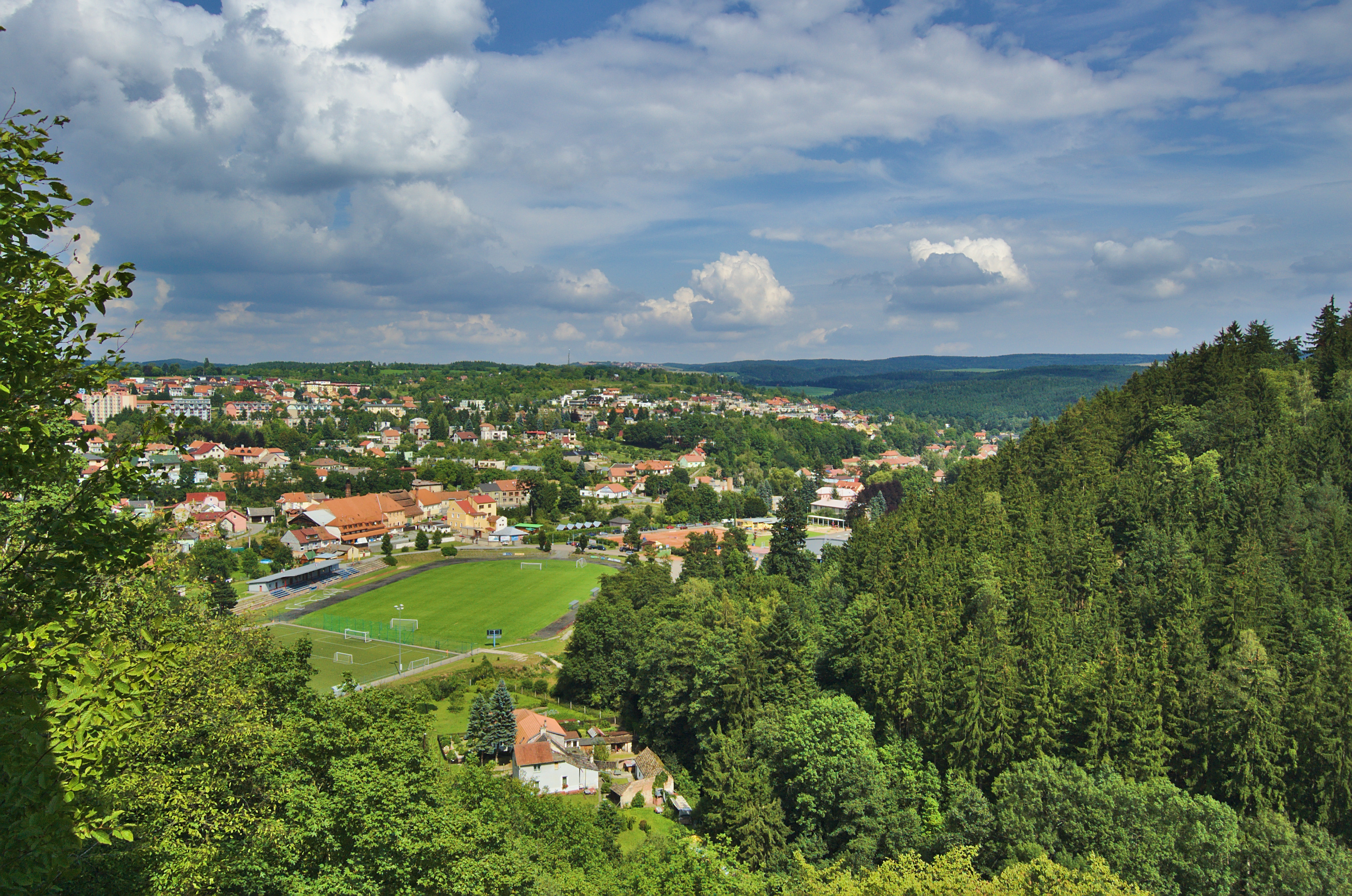
View of the eastern part of the town
