= Pelacha =

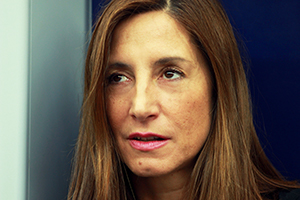

Background information
- Also known as: Redsonja
- Born: 26 August 1970 (age 55) Vigo, Spain
- Origin: Spain
- Genres: Techno, Experimental techno, Electro, Deep house
- Occupation(s): Producer, Label Owner, Promoter, DJ
- Years active: 1992-present
- Labels: Redsonja Records
- Website: https://www.stelarbooking.com

Pelacha (Redsonja Records) is a Spanish DJ, producer, record label owner and events promoter.

== Musical career ==
Pelacha is a Dj from Spain, she started her career as a DJ at the end of the 80’s in Madrid. She was resident dj in many of Madrid’s clubs that have marked a before and after in the electronic scene like Consulado, Epsilon, Arena, Davai, Surface (Sala Groove).

Pelacha has played two times in Awakenings Festival. She is resident dj and promoter of Techno Cracks! and 100% Femenine.

=== Producer ===
Pelacha runs her own record label Redsonja Records which releases on digital and vinyl format. The scotch RUBADUB is in charge for the distribution. Pelacha has been remixed by artists such as Heiko Laux

== Discography ==
- One a different Club. Mix CD. Aire Music Label.
- Yo DJ DVD. Showcase set.
- TechnoMad Mix CD.
- Universo DJs. Mix CD. Vale Music.
- Pelacha “GiveMoreGetMore” Lessismore Recordings, 2009
- Pelacha “Nueva Era” Inout Records, 2009
- PELACHA_PLAYGROUND 08 EP
- PLAYGROUND 03, PELACHA AND FRIENDS
- Pelacha 'Nueva Serie' Inout Records 7-2009
- Pelacha 'Acid Troops Feat Vasco' Inout Records 7-2009
- Pelacha 'GET UP' RedSonja Records 01-2010
- Pelacha 'GET UP REMIXES' RedSonja Records 02-2010
- Pelacha 'Funny Friends' RedSonja Records 03-2011
- Pelacha 'Studio' Redsonja Records 04-2012
- Pelacha - Hd Substance 'Total Black' Voodoo Soul records 5-2012
- Pelacha 'Waterfalls of Sounds' Silent Clap Music Label 5-2012
- Pelacha 'Metaphors ep' NuLabel 11-2012
- Pelacha 'Deslazados' Software Records 12-2012
- Pelacha ‘Studio’ Redsonja Records 2012
- Pelacha ‘Botánica 01’ Redsonja Records 01-2014
- Pelacha ‘Botánica 02’ Redsonja Records 04-2014
- Pelacha ‘Obediencia Ep’ I-Traxx Recording 05-2014
- MendezisMZ ‘Blue Level Pelacha Remix’ Caledor Records 07-2014
- Pelacha ‘Botánica 03’ Redsonja Records 09-2014
- Buenavida ‘Steel landscape Pelacha Remix’ Redsonja Records 01-2015
- Pelacha ‘10’ Glider Records 09-2015
- ‘Construction & Decostruction’ Caledor Records 01 – 2016
- ‘Pelacha Isa/Viole’ Redsonja Records 5-2016
- Pelacha 'Valores' Redsonja Records 05 - 2017
