= Institute of Experimental Medicine, Academy of Sciences of the Czech Republic =

Czech research institute

Institute of Experimental Medicine (IEM)

About the Institute
- Established: 1975
- Faculty: Approximately 80
- Postdoc. Fellows: Approximately 25
- Staff: Over 100
- Operating Budget: $10 million (FY 2012–2013)
- Campus: 300-acre (1.2 km^{2})
- Address: Videnska 1083, Prague, Czech Republic, 142 20
- Country: CZ
- Website: IEM website
- Affiliations: Charles University in Prague

Research Funding
- Academy of Sciences
- Ministry of Health
- Grant Agency
- Private Funds&Investors
- IEM Foundation
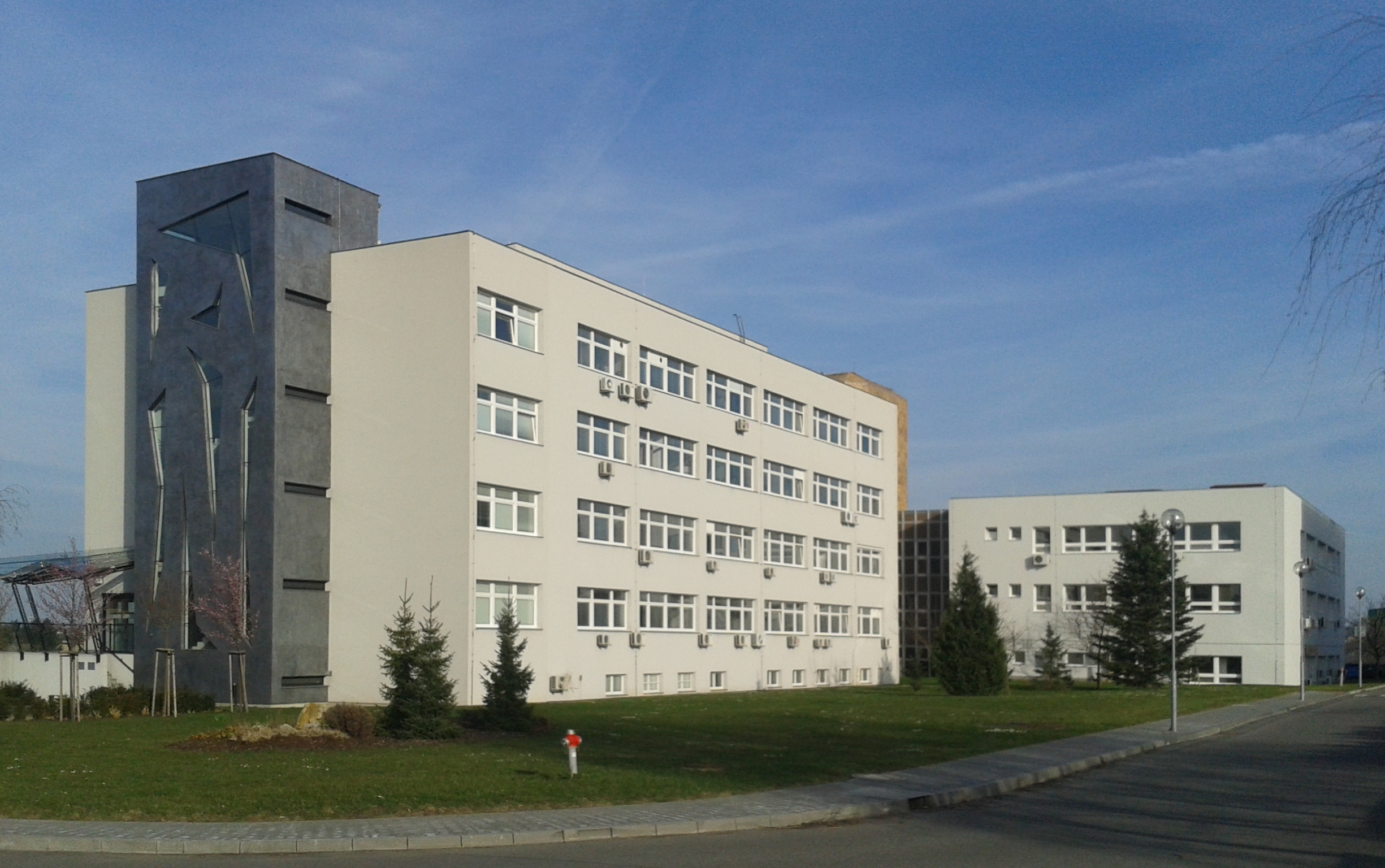
- IEM Center Building

Institute of Experimental Medicine, Academy of Sciences of the Czech Republic (IEM) (Czech: Ústav experimentální medicíny Akademie věd České republiky) is focused on biomedical research, incl. cell biology, neuropathology, teratology, cancer research, molecular embryology, stem cells and nervous tissue regeneration as such leading institution in the research in the CR it was selected as an EU Center of Excellence (MEDIPRA). IEM is member of Network of European Neuroscience Institutes (ENI-NET).

== Departments ==
=== Auditory Neuroscience ===
Laboratory of Auditory Physiology and Pathology, Laboratory of Synaptic Physiology

=== Genetic Ecotoxicology ===
Laboratory of Molecular Epidemiology, Laboratory of Genetic Toxicology, Laboratory of Genomics

=== Teratology ===
Laboratory of Embryogenesis, Laboratory of Odontogenesis

=== Molecular Biology of Cancer ===
Laboratory of the Genetics of Cancer, Laboratory of DNA Repair

=== Transplantation Immunology ===
Laboratory of Eye Histochemistry and Pharmacology

=== Neuroscience ===
Laboratory of Diffusion Studies and Imaging Methods, Laboratory of Tissue Culture and Stem Cells, Laboratory of biomaterials and biophysical methods)

=== Other departments ===
Dep. of Cellular Neurophysiology, Molecular Neurophysiology, Functional Organization of Biomembranes, Pharmacology, Tissue Engineering
