= Recognition of same-sex unions in the Czech Republic =

The Czech Republic has recognized registered partnerships for same-sex couples since 1 July 2006. The partnership law was passed by the Chamber of Deputies of the Czech Republic in March 2006, overturning President Václav Klaus' veto, and went into effect on 1 July. While initially providing only a limited set of rights and obligations, including inheritance, the right to declare a same-sex partner as next of kin, spousal privilege and alimony rights, a bill expanding the rights of registered partnerships came into force on 1 January 2025, granting registered partners the same rights, obligations and responsibilities as opposite-sex married couples apart from the title of marriage and the possibility of joint adoption (though stepchild adoption is permitted). The Czech Republic also recognizes unregistered cohabitation status for "persons living in a common household", granting inheritance and succession rights in housing.

The Czech Republic does not recognise same-sex marriage. Polling suggests that a large majority of Czechs support the legal recognition of same-sex marriage.

== Registered partnerships ==
=== Passage of legislation in 2006 ===
There had been several attempts to allow same-sex registered partnerships in the Czech Republic. In 1998, a partnership bill reached the Chamber of Deputies, but was defeated by two votes. In 1999, the chamber voted against another bill. In February 2001, the Zeman Cabinet presented a third bill, which was rejected by Parliament in October 2001. On 11 February 2005, another bill was defeated by one vote. It was backed by 82 out of the 165 deputies present, most voting in favour being Social Democrats, Communists, Freedom Union members and some deputies from the opposition Civic Democratic Party (ODS). In April 2005, a partnership bill passed its first reading in the Chamber with 82 votes for and 9 against. On 16 December 2005, it passed its third reading with 86 votes for, 54 against, and 7 abstentions. The legislation established registered partnerships (Czech: registrované partnerství, pronounced [ˈrɛɡɪstrovanɛː ˈpartnɛrstviː]) for same-sex couples, providing several of the rights of marriage, including inheritance, the right to declare a same-sex partner as next of kin, hospital visitation rights, jail and prison visitation rights, spousal privilege and alimony rights, but not allowing joint adoption rights, widow's pension or joint property rights.

16 December 2005 vote in the Chamber of Deputies
Party	Voted for	Voted against	Abstained	Absent (Did not vote)
G Czech Social Democratic Party	45: Robin Böhnisch; Vladimír Čada; Karel Černý; Anna Čurdová; Milan Ekert; Václav Grüner; Jana Hamplová; Michal Hašek; Josef Hojdar; Zdeněk Jičínský; Miloslav Kala; František Koníček; Zdeněk Koudelka; Jaroslav Krákora; Karel Kratochvíle; Michal Kraus; Stanislav Křeček; Pavol Kubuš; Jitka Kupčová; Vladimír Laštůvka; Dagmar Mocová; Oldřich Němec; Hana Orgoníková; Břetislav Petr; Petr Rafaj; Josef Řihák; Antonín Seďa; Hana Šedivá; Iva Šedivá; Zdeněk Škromach; Josef Smýkal; Bohuslav Sobotka; Karel Šplíchal; František Strnad; Petr Šulák; Miloš Titz; Jiří Třešňák; Radim Turek; Miroslav Váňa; Miloslav Vlček; František Vnouček; Jitka Vojtilová; Václav Votava; Lubomír Zaorálek; Eduard Zeman	–	1: Petr Ibl	24: Vlastimil Aubrecht; Pavel Hönig; Miroslav Kapoun; Jan Kavan; Robert Kopecký; Jozef Kubinyi; Miloš Kužvart; Petr Lachnit; Miroslav Máče; Radko Martínek; Miloš Máša; Miloš Melčák; Alfréd Michalík; Josef Mikuta; Eva Nováková; Jaromír Schling; Ladislav Skopal; Evžen Snítilý; Miroslav Svoboda; Antonín Sýkora; Rudolf Tomíček; Jiří Václavek; Ladislav Vomáčko; Petr Zgarba
Civic Democratic Party	13: Josef Bíža; Vladimír Doležal; Kateřina Dostálová; Tomáš Hasil; Zdeňka Horníková; Helena Mallotová; Alena Páralová; Josef Poláček; Jiří Pospíšil; Aleš Rozehnal; Karel Sehoř; Lucie Talmanová; Petr Tluchoř	30: Walter Bartoš; Jan Bauer; Marek Benda; Jiří Bílý; Radim Chytka; Michal Doktor; Tomáš Dub; Pavel Hrnčíř; Libor Ježek; Jan Klas; Jozef Kochan; Martin Kocourek; Miroslav Krajíček; Petr Krill; Václav Mencl; Petr Nečas; Miroslava Němcová; Zbyněk Novotný; Miroslav Pátek; Jaroslav Pešán; Jaroslav Plachý; Petr Pleva; Martin Říman; Jan Schwippel; David Šeich; Tomáš Teplík; Vlastimil Tlustý; Eduard Vávra; Jan Vidím; Tom Zajíček	4: Tomáš Kladívko; Jiří Papež; Pavel Suchánek; Bohuslav Záruba	10: Miroslav Beneš; Petr Bratský; Eva Dundáčková; Miloslav Kučera; Ivan Langer; Václav Nájemník; Veronika Nedvědová; Miloš Patera; Lubomír Suk; Oldřich Vojíř
Communist Party of Bohemia and Moravia	22: František Beneš; Milan Bičík; Květoslava Čelišová; Vlastimil Dlab; Jiří Dolejš; Jiřina Fialová; Stanislav Fischer; Stanislav Grospič; Jitka Gruntová; Pavel Hojda; Vladimír Koníček; Pavel Kováčik; Ivana Levá; Soňa Marková; Miroslav Opálka; Zuzka Bebarová Rujbrová; Josef Šenfeld; Ladislav Urban; Miroslava Vlčková; Miloslava Vostrá; Karel Vymětal; Antonín Zralý	4: Petr Braný; Ladislav Býček; Jaroslav Gongol; Josef Švarcbek	2: Ladislav Mlčák; Svatomír Recman	13: Vlastislav Antolák; Marta Bayerová; Alexander Černý; Václav Exner; Vojtěch Filip; Václav Frank; Miroslav Grebeníček; Kateřina Konečná; Josef Mandík; Zdeněk Maršíček; Vladimír Reiber; Marie Rusová; Josef Vondruška
G Christian and Democratic Union – Czechoslovak People's Party	–	19: Libor Ambrozek; Jan Grůza; Jiří Hanuš; Vilém Holáň; Ludvík Hovorka; Josef Janeček; Miroslav Kalousek; Jiří Karas; Jan Kasal; Tomáš Kvapil; Vlasta Parkanová; Vladimír Říha; Pavel Severa; Jan Škopík; Michaela Šojdrová; Ladislav Šustr; Jaromír Talíř; Josef Vícha; Ivo Vykydal	–	2: Jaroslav Lobkowicz; Cyril Svoboda
G Freedom Union – Democratic Union	5: Taťána Fischerová; Svatopluk Karásek; Petr Kott; František Pelc; Pavel Svoboda	1: Zdeněk Kořistka	–	4: Karel Kühnl; Pavel Němec; Vlastimil Ostrý; Robert Vokáč
Independent	1: Tomáš Vrbík	–	–	–
Total	86	54	7	53
Total	43.0%	27.0%	3.5%	26.5%

The legislation was passed by the Senate on 26 January 2006 in a 65–14 vote. On 16 February 2006, President Václav Klaus vetoed the bill. In response, Prime Minister Jiří Paroubek said that he would seek a parliamentary majority (101 votes) in the lower chamber to override the veto, and did so successfully on 15 March 2006 with the exact number of votes needed.

15 March 2006 vote in the Chamber of Deputies
Party	Voted for	Voted against	Abstained	Absent (Did not vote)
G Czech Social Democratic Party	66: Vlastimil Aubrecht; Robin Böhnisch; Vladimír Čada; Karel Černý; Anna Čurdová; Milan Ekert; Andrej Grega; Václav Grüner; Jana Hamplová; Michal Hašek; Pavel Hönig; Zdeněk Jičínský; Miloslav Kala; Miroslav Kapoun; Jan Kavan; Robert Kopecký; Zdeněk Koudelka; Jaroslav Krákora; Karel Kratochvíle; Stanislav Křeček; Jozef Kubinyi; Pavol Kubuš; Jitka Kupčová; Miloš Kužvart; Petr Lachnit; Vladimír Laštůvka; Miroslav Máče; Radko Martínek; Miloš Máša; Lenka Mazuchová; Miloš Melčák; Alfréd Michalík; Dagmar Mocová; Oldřich Němec; Hana Orgoníková; Břetislav Petr; Petr Rafaj; Josef Řihák; Jaromír Schling; Antonín Seďa; Hana Šedivá; Iva Šedivá; Ladislav Skopal; Zdeněk Škromach; Josef Smýkal; Evžen Snítilý; Bohuslav Sobotka; Karel Šplíchal; František Strnad; Petr Šulák; Miroslav Svoboda; Antonín Sýkora; Miloš Titz; Jiří Třešňák; Radim Turek; Jiří Václavek; Miroslav Váňa; Miloslav Vlček; František Vnouček; Jitka Vojtilová; Ladislav Vomáčko; Václav Votava; Lubomír Zaorálek; Cyril Zapletal; Eduard Zeman; Petr Zgarba	2: Josef Mikuta; Rudolf Tomíček	1: Petr Ibl	1: Eva Nováková
Civic Democratic Party	2: Josef Bíža; Helena Mallotová	26: Walter Bartoš; Jan Bauer; Marek Benda; Radim Chytka; Michal Doktor; Eva Dundáčková; Pavel Hrnčíř; Tomáš Kádner; Jan Klas; Jozef Kochan; Martin Kocourek; Miroslav Krajíček; Petr Krill; Miloslav Kučera; Václav Mencl; Petr Nečas; Miroslav Pátek; Jaroslav Pešán; Jaroslav Plachý; Petr Pleva; Martin Říman; Jan Schwippel; Tomáš Teplík; Eduard Vávra; Jan Vidím; Tom Zajíček	14: Kateřina Dostálová; Tomáš Hasil; Tomáš Kladívko; Ivan Langer; Václav Nájemník; Veronika Nedvědová; Jiří Papež; Alena Páralová; Miloš Patera; Josef Poláček; Pavel Suchánek; Lubomír Suk; Petr Tluchoř; Oldřich Vojíř	15: Miroslav Beneš; Jiří Bílý; Petr Bratský; Tomáš Dub; Zdeňka Horníková; Libor Ježek; Miroslava Němcová; Zbyněk Novotný; Jiří Pospíšil; Aleš Rozehnal; Karel Sehoř; David Šeich; Lucie Talmanová; Vlastimil Tlustý; Bohuslav Záruba
Communist Party of Bohemia and Moravia	26: František Beneš; Milan Bičík; Květoslava Čelišová; Alexander Černý; Vlastimil Dlab; Jiří Dolejš; Václav Exner; Jiřina Fialová; Stanislav Fischer; Václav Frank; Stanislav Grospič; Jitka Gruntová; Pavel Hojda; Kateřina Konečná; Vladimír Koníček; Pavel Kováčik; Ivana Levá; Soňa Marková; Miroslav Opálka; Zuzka Bebarová Rujbrová; Josef Šenfeld; Ladislav Urban; Miroslava Vlčková; Miloslava Vostrá; Karel Vymětal; Antonín Zralý	9: Marta Bayerová; Petr Braný; Ladislav Býček; Jaroslav Gongol; Zdeněk Maršíček; Vladimír Reiber; Marie Rusová; Josef Švarcbek; Josef Vondruška	3: Vojtěch Filip; Ladislav Mlčák; Svatomír Recman	3: Vlastislav Antolák; Miroslav Grebeníček; Josef Mandík
G Christian and Democratic Union – Czechoslovak People's Party	–	20: Libor Ambrozek; Jan Grůza; Jiří Hanuš; Vilém Holáň; Ludvík Hovorka; Josef Janeček; Miroslav Kalousek; Jiří Karas; Jan Kasal; Tomáš Kvapil; Jaroslav Lobkowicz; Vlasta Parkanová; Pavel Severa; Jan Škopík; Michaela Šojdrová; Ladislav Šustr; Cyril Svoboda; Jaromír Talíř; Josef Vícha; Ivo Vykydal	–	1: Vladimír Říha
G Freedom Union – Democratic Union	7: Taťána Fischerová; Svatopluk Karásek; Petr Kott; Pavel Němec; Vlastimil Ostrý; František Pelc; Pavel Svoboda	–	–	3: Zdeněk Kořistka; Karel Kühnl; Robert Vokáč
Independent	–	–	1: Tomáš Vrbík	–
Total	101	57	19	23
Total	50.5%	28.5%	9.5%	11.5%

In September 2014, a group of deputies introduced a bill to permit a person to adopt the stepchildren of their registered partner (i.e. stepchild adoption). In October 2014, the Sobotka Cabinet decided not to take an official stance on the bill. Instead, on 24 October 2016, it approved its own draft bill on the issue, and introduced it to Parliament on 8 November. The bills were not brought to a vote before the 2017 parliamentary election.

There were a number of differences between registered partnerships and marriages. Registered partners did not have the same rights to shared property as married couples, did not receive the same tax benefits, and did not have the right to a widow or widower's pension or adoption rights. These rights (except for joint adoption) were extended to registered partners in 2025. Another major distinction was that registered partnerships could only be performed in the 14 regional capitals, whereas marriages can be performed in over 1,200 registry offices throughout the country. This was noted in a July 2016 report by the ombudsman office, which also stated that a dying person in a hospital could not enter into a partnership because of these restrictions. A law which took effect on 1 January 2024 changed this requirement, allowing registered partnerships to be concluded at all registry offices in the country.

=== Expansion of rights in 2025 ===
In 2022, a group of lawmakers introduced a same-sex marriage bill to the Chamber of Deputies. In November 2023, the Chamber's Constitutional and Legal Affairs Committee failed to reach an agreement on whether to approve the bill as introduced or amended versions which would not legalize same-sex marriage but instead provide partnerships equal to marriage in all but name. On 28 February, the Chamber passed an amendment expanding the rights of registered partnerships (including the right to stepchild adoption) by a 118 to 33 vote without voting on the initial version of the same-sex marriage bill. The amended draft law was approved in its entirety by the Chamber by a vote of 123 to 36 that same day. It was approved by the Senate on 17 April 2024 despite attempts by some lawmakers to amend the bill to permit same-sex marriages. The legislation would expand the right of registered partners to shared property, full tax benefits, the right to a widow or widower's pension, and stepchild adoption. It was signed by President Petr Pavel on 29 April, and went into force on 1 January 2025.

28 February 2024 vote in the Chamber of Deputies
Party	Voted for	Voted against	Abstained	Absent (Did not vote)
ANO 2011	65: Věra Adámková; Andrej Babiš; Andrea Babišová; Ondřej Babka; Jana Berkovcová; Stanislav Berkovec; Jana Hamplová; Richard Brabec; Milan Brázdil; Lubomír Brož; Jaroslav Bžoch; Klára Dostálová; Lenka Dražilová; Jaroslav Faltýnek; Kamal Farhan; Milan Feranec; Eva Fialová; Stanislav Fridrich; Jana Hanzlíková; Karel Havlíček; Tomáš Helebrant; Igor Hendrych; Ivan Jáč; Miloslav Janulík; David Kasal; Lenka Knechtová; Tomáš Kohoutek; Martin Kolovratník; Josef Kott; Robert Králíček; Roman Kubíček; Jan Kubík; Martin Kukla; Hubert Lang; Ivana Mádlová; Taťána Malá; Jiří Mašek; Lubomír Metnar; Jana Mračková Vildumetzová; Marek Novák; Monika Oborná; Ladislav Okleštěk; Renata Oulehlová; Zuzana Ožanová; Jana Pastuchová; Berenika Peštová; František Petrtýl; Jaroslava Pokorná Jermanová; David Pražák; Karel Rais; Michal Ratiborský; Jan Richter; Pavel Růžička; Drahoslav Ryba; Petr Sadovský; Jiří Strýček; Robert Stržínek; Julius Špičák; David Štolpa; Karel Tureček; Helena Válková; Jan Volný; Radek Vondráček; Lubomír Wenzl; Milan Wenzl	–	1: Alena Schillerová	5: Margita Balaštíková; Romana Fischerová; Aleš Juchelka; Patrik Nacher; Petr Vrána
G Civic Democratic Party	18: Martin Baxa; Marek Benda; Stanislav Blaha; Pavel Blažek; Jana Černochová; Eva Decroix; Petr Fiala; Petr Fifka; Jiří Havránek; Jan Hofmann; Karel Krejza; Martin Kupka; Martin Major; Zdenka Němečková Crkvenjaš; Zbyněk Stanjura; Bohuslav Svoboda; Renáta Zajíčková; Pavel Žáček	4: Jan Bauer; Václav Král; Vojtěch Munzar; Vít Vomáčka	9: Ivan Adamec; Jana Bačíková; Petr Bendl; Jan Bureš; Karel Haas; Jakub Janda; Rudolf Salvetr; Jan Skopeček; Libor Turek	3: Petr Beitl; Pavel Kašník; Pavel Staněk
G Mayors and Independents	14: Jan Berki; Josef Bernard; Josef Cogan; Josef Flek; Martin Hájek; Jana Krutáková; Jan Kuchař; Jarmila Levko; Petr Liška; Tomáš Müller; Hana Naiclerová; Eliška Olšáková; Petra Quittová; Milada Voborská	6: Roman Bělor; Martin Exner; Jan Lacina; Vít Rakušan; Barbora Urbanová; Lukáš Vlček	3: Jiří Hájek; Ondřej Lochman; Michael Rataj	10: Vladimír Balaš; Tomáš Dubský; Petr Gazdík; Věra Kovářová; Petr Letocha; Michaela Opltová; Pavla Pivoňka Vaňková; Lucie Potůčková; Michaela Šebelová; Viktor Vojtko
G Christian and Democratic Union – Czechoslovak People's Party	6: Marie Jílková; Jiří Navrátil; Tom Philipp; David Šimek; Marek Výborný; Miroslav Zborovský	6: Romana Bělohlávková; Pavla Golasowská; Šimon Heller; Nina Nováková; Hayato Okamura; Karel Smetana	7: Ondřej Benešík; Jiří Carbol; Aleš Dufek; Marian Jurečka; Vít Kaňkovský; Róbert Teleky; Antonín Tesařík	4: Jan Bartošek; Pavel Bělobrádek; Jiří Horák; Michael Kohajda
Freedom and Direct Democracy	–	17: Oldřich Černý; Jaroslav Dvořák; Radim Fiala; Jan Hrnčíř; Zdeněk Kettner; Jiří Kobza; Radek Koten; Vladimíra Lesenská; Tomio Okamura; Marie Pošarová; Radek Rozvoral; Jan Síla; Karel Sládeček; Lucie Šafránková; Iveta Štefanová; Radovan Vích; Vladimír Zlínský	–	3: Jaroslav Bašta; Jaroslav Foldyna; Karla Maříková
G TOP 09	14: Matěj Ondřej Havel; Jan Jakob; Pavel Klíma; Ondřej Kolář; Michal Kučera; Helena Langšádlová; Miloš Nový; Martina Ochodnická; Markéta Pekarová Adamová; Jiří Slavík; Pavel Svoboda; Vlastimil Válek; Michal Zuna; Marek Ženíšek	–	–	–
G Czech Pirate Party	–	–	–	4: Ivan Bartoš; Klára Kocmanová; Jakub Michálek; Olga Richterová
Independent	1: Ivo Vondrák	–	–	–
Total	118	33	20	29
Total	59.0%	16.5%	10.0%	14.5%

=== Statistics ===
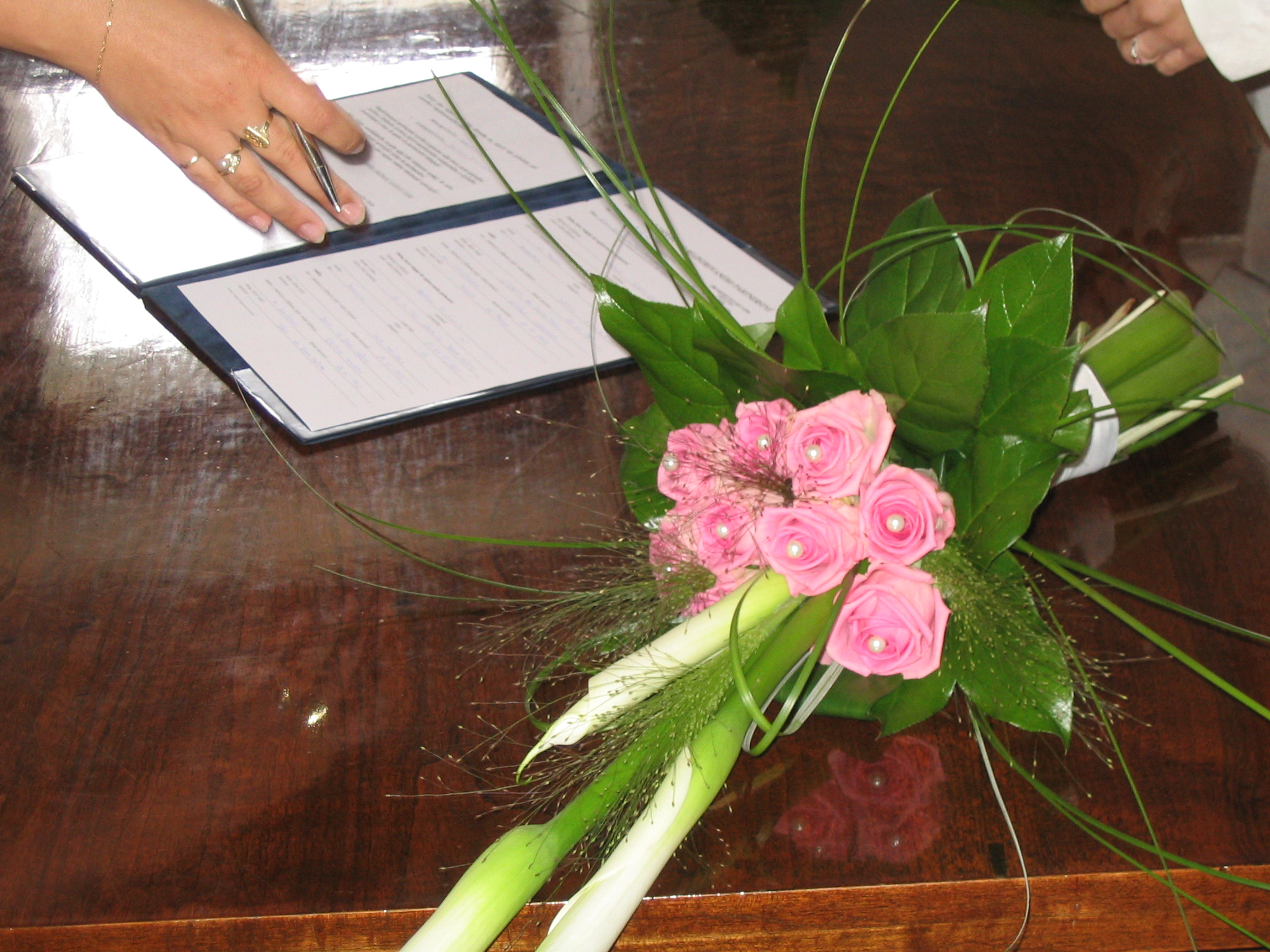
Pink roses and signing of a registered partnership license in Brno, August 2006

By June 2009, 780 registered partnerships had been conducted in the Czech Republic. By the end of 2010, that number had increased to 1,110, of which 66 had been dissolved. A large majority of these partnerships involved two Czech citizens, though there were also several couples with at least one partner from the United States, Slovakia or the United Kingdom. Most partnerships were performed in Prague followed by Central Bohemia and South Moravia, while Zlín and Vysočina registered the fewest partnerships.

The number of registered partnerships differs between data collected from parish registers and data from the Ministry of the Interior. Data collected from parish registers shows that 4,283 partnerships were performed between 2006 and 2021: 235 in 2006, 258 in 2007, 233 in 2008, 209 in 2009, 205 in 2010, 188 in 2011, 209 in 2012, 212 in 2013, 242 in 2014, 254 on 2015, 363 in 2016, 334 in 2017, 342 in 2018, 360 in 2019, 324 in 2020, and 315 in 2021. 6.4% of these partnerships were performed in Czech embassies or consulates abroad. By the end of 2019, about a quarter of these partnerships had been dissolved, lower than the divorce rate of opposite-sex partners at around 50%. Male couples account for the majority of partnerships.

== Same-sex marriage ==
Laws regarding same-sex partnerships in Europe¹ Marriage Civil union Limited domestic recognition (cohabitation) Unrecognized Constitution limits marriage to opposite-sex couples ¹ May include recent laws or court decisions that have not yet entered into effect.

=== Failed attempts in 2017–2021 ===
The Green Party and the Pirate Party expressed support for same-sex marriage in their 2017 electoral programs. Following the adoption of a same-sex marriage law by the German Bundestag in June 2017, Zbyněk Stanjura, a deputy from the Civic Democratic Party, suggested that his party could agree to a free vote in Parliament. Before the October 2017 election, activists started a campaign called "We Are Fair" (Czech: Jsme fér, pronounced [jsmɛ fɛːr]) to legalise same-sex marriage in the Czech Republic. The campaign found that a majority of deputies from ANO 2011, the Pirate Party, the Social Democratic Party, TOP 09, and the Mayors and Independents (STAN) supported same-sex marriage, while a minority of ODS, Communist and KDU-ČSL MPs and no deputy from the Freedom and Direct Democracy (SPD) party did so. Prime Minister Andrej Babiš expressed support for the legalisation of same-sex marriage.

On 12 June 2018, a bill to legalise same-sex marriage, sponsored by 46 deputies, was introduced to the Chamber of Deputies. Three days later, a group of 37 deputies proposed a constitutional amendment to define marriage as the "union of a man and a woman" in the Constitution of the Czech Republic, which would have required a two-thirds majority in the Chamber. On 22 June 2018, the Babiš Cabinet announced its support for the same-sex marriage bill. The "We Are Fair" campaign presented 70,350 signatures in support of same-sex marriage to the Chamber of Deputies in late June. The first reading of the same-sex marriage bill was scheduled for 31 October, but was delayed to 14 November. As debate on both bills began, individual MPs spoke on both sides of the issue rather than split on party lines, indicative of a conscience vote. A vote was expected in January 2019, but was postponed to 26 March 2019, but then postponed again. On 10 January 2019, President Miloš Zeman said he might veto the same-sex marriage bill if it were passed by Parliament. Such a veto would force a second vote on the law, with the support of 101 deputies (50% + 1) required to override the presidential veto. On 29 April 2021, a proposal to reject the bill at first reading failed, receiving 41 votes from the 93 deputies present, and the bill therefore progressed to the committee stage. However, it did not advance further before the October 2021 election.

=== Failed attempts in 2022–2024 ===
In June 2022, a cross-party same-sex marriage bill was introduced to the Chamber of Deputies. The bill would grant same-sex couples the same legal rights and benefits as opposite-sex married spouses, including joint property rights, adoption rights, the right to inherit their partner's pension and access to alternative family care. Several candidates in the 2023 presidential election supported same-sex marriage and adoption rights, including the winner, Petr Pavel, and runner-up Andrej Babiš.

Debate on the bill began in May 2023. A poll conducted at the time showed that 72% of Czechs supported same-sex marriage. The bill passed its first reading by 68 votes to 58 in the Chamber of Deputies on 29 June. On 6 September 2023, several companies, including Vodafone, Microsoft, Danone, Československá obchodní banka and IKEA, supported an open letter to the government in support of the bill. In November 2023, the Chamber's Constitutional and Legal Affairs Committee failed to reach an agreement on whether to approve the bill as introduced or amended versions which would not legalize same-sex marriage but instead provide partnerships equal to marriage in all but name. The marriage bill was approved at second reading in the Chamber on 7 February 2024. On 14 February, the committee recommended that the Chamber vote on the proposals from the most expansive to the least expansive, but on 28 February the Chamber reversed that order and passed an amendment expanding the rights of registered partnerships (including the right to stepchild adoption) by a 118 to 33 vote without voting on the initial version of the same-sex marriage bill. The bill passed the Senate in April, and was signed into law by President Pavel on 29 April. Jsme fér released a statement describing the bill's passage as "a sad day for justice and equality in our country. [...] Despite the clear majority support for marriage for all in the Czech Republic, [Parliament] did not adopt this law."

=== Developments in 2025–present ===
In a legal case involving a dual Polish-German couple who had married in Germany but sought recognition of their marriage in Poland, Jakub Cupriak-Trojan and Mateusz Trojan v Wojewoda Mazowiecki, the European Court of Justice (ECJ) ruled on 25 November 2025 that Poland must recognise same-sex marriages performed in other member states of the European Union. The ruling had an immediate legal effect in the Czech Republic as well, with media outlets reporting that "authorities must recognize same-sex marriages performed abroad as full marriages, rather than just granting them the limited rights of a registered partnership". Cupriak-Trojan and Trojan does not compel the Czech Republic to change its domestic laws to legalise same-sex marriage, but it does require that the country accept the legal status of couples married elsewhere in the European Union.

=== Religious performance ===
In October 2022, the Old Catholic Church of the Czech Republic voted to allow its priests to bless same-sex partnerships. It began allowing registered partnerships to be performed in official church ceremonies in January 2025. In May 2023, the Evangelical Church of Czech Brethren, the second largest Christian denomination in the Czech Republic, also voted to allow its pastors to bless same-sex unions.

The Catholic Church opposes same-sex marriage and does not allow its priests to officiate at such marriages. In December 2023, the Holy See published Fiducia supplicans, a declaration allowing Catholic priests to bless couples who are not considered to be married according to church teaching, including the blessing of same-sex couples.

== Public opinion ==
A 2007 opinion poll from the Center for Public Opinion Research (CVVM; Centrum pro výzkum veřejného mínění) indicated that 36% of Czechs supported the legalisation of same-sex marriage, while 57% were opposed. A May 2017 opinion poll by CVVM found a 52% majority in favour of legalising same-sex marriage, with 41% opposed. A 2017 poll conducted by the Pew Research Center showed that 65% of Czechs supported same-sex marriage. Support was far higher among 18–34-year-olds, with only 18% of people in that age group being opposed to same-sex marriage. A Median poll conducted in February 2018 (and published in April) found that 75% of Czechs supported the right of gay and lesbian couples to marry, while 19% were opposed. 13% believed that legalising same-sex marriage would threaten opposite-sex marriages, and 8% believed it would threaten them personally. Additionally, 61% of Czechs were in support of adoption by same-sex couples, while 31% were opposed.

A poll from January 2019, when a same-sex marriage bill was scheduled to undergo first reading in Parliament, indicated that 61% of Czechs supported same-sex marriage. Various Czech celebrities also expressed support, including tennis player Martina Navratilova, singers Bára Basiková and Dara Rolins, photographer Robert Vano, actresses Simona Stašová and Anna Geislerová, and politician Ivan Bartoš. According to a June 2019 survey conducted in May 2019 by CVVM, 75% of respondents supported registered partnerships with 20% opposed, 47% supported same-sex marriage with 48% opposed, and 60% supported stepchild adoption with 31% opposed. A Median poll published in January 2020 showed that 67% of Czechs supported same-sex marriage, and 62% supported joint adoption by same-sex couples. The survey found a large generational gap, with younger respondents overwhelmingly in support, but those aged 55 and above mostly opposed.

A GLOBSEC survey conducted in March 2023 showed that 72% of Czechs supported same-sex marriage, while 24% were opposed. The 2023 Eurobarometer found that 60% of respondents thought same-sex marriage should be allowed throughout Europe, while 34% were opposed. The survey also found that 70% of Czechs thought that "there is nothing wrong in a sexual relationship between two persons of the same sex", while 26% disagreed.

An October 2023 Nielson/Publicis Groupe survey showed that more than half of Czechs would be "happy if politicians could quickly resolve the issue [of same-sex marriage]", while around 30% said they did not care if the issue was resolved and 11% of respondents said the issue "should not be rushed". Additionally, 9% of respondents said "their lives would get worse if an equal marriage law were adopted", whereas 80% believed that the adoption of such a law would not affect their lives, and 11% expected an improvement. A May–June 2025 CVVM survey showed that 64% of Czechs supported same-sex marriage, while 66% supported joint adoption rights and 81% supported stepchild adoption.

== See also ==
- LGBT rights in the Czech Republic
- Recognition of same-sex unions in Europe
