= List of MPs elected in the 2025 Czech parliamentary election =

10th Chamber of Deputies of the Czech Republic
←	9th
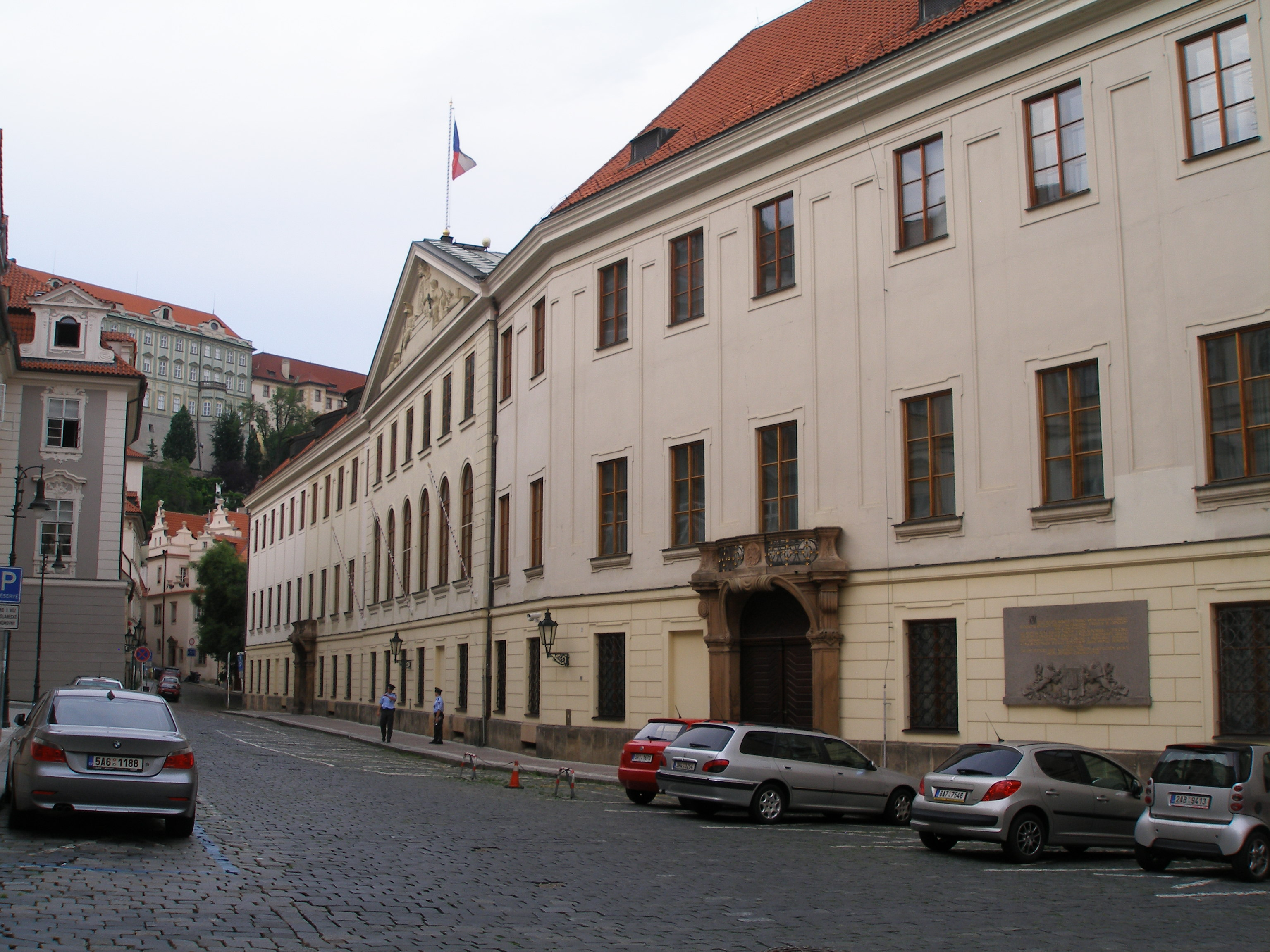

Overview
- Legislative body: Parliament of the Czech Republic
- Jurisdiction: Czech Republic
- Meeting place: Thun Palace
- Term: 3 November 2025 –
- Election: 2025 Czech parliamentary election

The list of members of the Chamber of Deputies of the Parliament of the Czech Republic after the 2025 elections provides an overview of the deputies elected to the Chamber of Deputies of the Parliament of the Czech Republic in the elections held on 3 and 4 October 2025.

== Current composition ==
18	22	16	9	27	80	13	15
Pirates	STAN	KDU-ČSL	TOP 09	ODS	ANO 2011	AUTO	SPD

2025 result

Party	Seats
ANO 2011	80
ODS	27
STAN	22
Pirates	18
KDU-ČSL	16
SPD	15
AUTO	13
TOP 09	9

== List of Members of Parliament ==
Name	Party	Region	Notes
Ivan Adamec	ODS	Hradec Králové	
Věra Adámková	ANO 2011	Prague	
Hana Ančincová	Pirates	Zlín	
Andrej Babiš	ANO 2011	Ústí nad Labem	
Ondřej Babka	ANO 2011	South Bohemian	
Jana Bačíková	ODS	South Moravian	
Jiří Barták	AUTO	Zlín	
Pavel Bartoň	ANO 2011	Zlín	
Ivan Bartoš	Pirates	South Bohemian	
Jan Bartošek	KDU-ČSL	South Bohemian	
Lucie Bartošová	ODS	Liberec	
Jan Bauer	ODS	South Bohemian	
Martin Baxa	ODS	Plzeň	
Marek Benda	ODS	Prague	
Petr Bendl	ODS	Central Bohemian	
Karel Beran	AUTO	Vysočina	Left the Parliament on 29 May 2026
Jan Berki	STAN	Liberec	
Jana Berkovcová	ANO 2011	Hradec Králové	
Drahomír Blažej	ANO 2011	Central Bohemian	
Zdeňka Blišťanová	TOP 09	Olomouc	
Jiří Bouška	ANO 2011	Central Bohemian	
Richard Brabec	ANO 2011	Ústí nad Labem	Left the Parliament on 3 November 2025
Milan Brázdil	ANO 2011	Olomouc	
Monika Brzesková	KDU-ČSL	Moravian–Silesian	
František Bureš	ANO 2011	Central Bohemian	
Jan Bureš	ODS	Karlovy Vary	
Jana Černochová	ODS	Prague	
Igor Červený	AUTO	Central Bohemian	
Benjamin Činčila	KDU-ČSL	Vysočina	
Eva Decroix	ODS	Vysočina	
Katerina Demetrashvili	Pirates	Prague	
Jana Demjanová	ANO 2011	Ústí nad Labem	Became a Deputy on 3 November 2025, replacing Richard Brabec
Denis Doksanský	ANO 2011	Hradec Králové	
Tomáš Doležal	SPD	Central Bohemian	
Lenka Dražilová	ANO 2011	South Moravian	
Karel Dvořák	STAN	Prague	
Jaroslav Faltýnek	ANO 2011	Olomouc	
Kamal Farhan	ANO 2011	Plzeň	
Irena Ferčíková Konečná	Pirates	South Moravian	
Petr Fiala	ODS	South Moravian	
Radim Fiala	SPD	Olomouc	
Eva Fialová	ANO 2011	Ústí nad Labem	
Jana Filipovičová	KDU-ČSL	South Moravian	
Josef Flek	STAN	South Moravian	
Jaroslav Foldyna	SPD	Ústí nad Labem	
Libor Forman	AUTO	Vysočina	Became a Deputy on 29 May 2026, replacing Karel Beran.
Stanislav Fridrich	ANO 2011	Moravian–Silesian	
Karin Gajdová	ANO 2011	Moravian–Silesian	
Matěj Gregor	AUTO	Moravian–Silesian	
Karel Haas	ODS	Pardubice	
Jana Hanzlíková	ANO 2011	Pardubice	
Matěj Ondřej Havel	TOP 09	Hradec Králové	Leader of TOP 09
Karel Havlíček	ANO 2011	Prague	
Jiří Havránek	ODS	Central Bohemian	
Vlastimil Hebr	ANO 2011	Plzeň	Became a Deputy on 3 November 2025, replacing Roman Zarzycký
Tomáš Helebrant	ANO 2011	Central Bohemian	
Igor Hendrych	ANO 2011	Moravian–Silesian	
Petr Hladík	KDU-ČSL	South Moravian	
Matěj Hlavatý	STAN	Hradec Králové	
Andrea Hoffmannová	Pirates	Moravian–Silesian	
Libor Hoppe	ODS	South Moravian	
Jiří Horák	KDU-ČSL	South Moravian	
Jan Hrnčíř	SPD	Pardubice	
Zdeněk Hřib	Pirates	Prague	Leader of the Czech Pirate Party
Monika Hubíková	ANO 2011	Zlín	
Adriana Chochelová	STAN	Central Bohemian	
Jan Jakob	TOP 09	Central Bohemian	
Jakub Janda	ODS	Moravian–Silesian	
Miloslav Janulík	ANO 2011	South Moravian	
Aleš Juchelka	ANO 2011	Moravian–Silesian	
Marian Jurečka	KDU-ČSL	Olomouc	
Pavel Karpíšek	ODS	Plzeň	
David Kasal	ANO 2011	Pardubice	
Zdena Kašparová	STAN	Olomouc	
Jiřina Klčová	ANO 2011	Pardubice	
Oto Klempíř	AUTO	Plzeň	
Tomáš Kohoutek	ANO 2011	Ústí nad Labem	
Vladimír Kolek	ANO 2011	Moravian–Silesian	
Martin Kolovratník	ANO 2011	Pardubice	
Radek Koten	SPD	Vysočina	
Josef Kott	ANO 2011	Vysočina	
Věra Kovářová	STAN	Central Bohemian	
Veronika Kovářová	Pirates	South Bohemian	
Petr Kowanda	ANO 2011	Central Bohemian	
Jakub Krainer	STAN	South Moravian	
Robert Králíček	ANO 2011	Prague	
Miroslav Krejčí	AUTO	South Bohemian	
Vojtěch Krňanský	AUTO	Pardubice	
Marie Kršková	KDU-ČSL	Pardubice	
Jana Krutáková	STAN	South Moravian	
Roman Kubíček	ANO 2011	South Bohemian	
Petr Kubis	ANO 2011	Karlovy Vary	Left the Parliament on 3 November 2025
Michal Kučera	TOP 09	Ústí nad Labem	
Šárka Kučerová	Pirates	Olomouc	Left the Parliament on 5 November 2025
Martin Kupec	ANO 2011	South Bohemian	
Martin Kupka	ODS	Central Bohemian	
Hubert Lang	ANO 2011	Plzeň	
Helena Langšádlová	TOP 09	Central Bohemian	
Jan Lipavský	ODS	Prague	
Petr Macinka	AUTO	South Moravian	
Ivana Mádlová	ANO 2011	Plzeň	
Zuzana Majerová	SPD	Zlín	
Taťána Malá	ANO 2011	South Moravian	
Lenka Martínková Španihelová	Pirates	Pardubice	
Jiří Mašek	ANO 2011	Hradec Králové	
Lubomír Metnar	ANO 2011	Olomouc	
Michaela Moricová	Pirates	Moravian–Silesian	
Vojtěch Munzar	ODS	Central Bohemian	
Jana Murová	ANO 2011	Moravian–Silesian	
Patrik Nacher	ANO 2011	Prague	
Anežka Nedomová	STAN	Pardubice	
Irena Němcová	SPD	Hradec Králové	
Zdenka Němečková Crkvenjaš	ODS	Moravian–Silesian	
Josef Nerušil	SPD	Prague	Became a Deputy on 11 March 2026, replacing Markéta Šichtařová
Bohuslav Niemiec	KDU-ČSL	Moravian–Silesian	
Marek Novák	ANO 2011	Zlín	
Monika Oborná	ANO 2011	Vysočina	
Hayato Okamura	KDU-ČSL	Prague	
Tomio Okamura	SPD	Central Bohemian	Leader of Freedom and Direct Democracy
Ladislav Okleštěk	ANO 2011	Olomouc	
Eliška Olšáková	STAN	Zlín	
Michaela Opltová	STAN	Plzeň	
Renata Oulehlová	ANO 2011	Karlovy Vary	
Pavel Outrata	ANO 2011	South Moravian	
Zuzana Ožanová	ANO 2011	Moravian–Silesian	
Jan Papajanovský	STAN	Ústí nad Labem	
Patrik Pařil	ANO 2011	South Moravian	
Jana Pastuchová	ANO 2011	Liberecký	
Jana Patková	Pirates	Hradec Králové	
Jiří Penc	ANO 2011	Karlovy Vary	Became a Deputy on 3 November 2025, replacing Petr Kubis
Berenika Peštová	ANO 2011	Ústí nad Labem	
František Petrtýl	ANO 2011	Central Bohemian	
Tom Philipp	KDU-ČSL	Prague	
Vladimír Pikora	AUTO	Ústí nad Labem	
Barbora Pipášová	Pirates	Vysočina	
Pavla Pivoňka Vaňková	STAN	South Bohemian	
Robert Plaga	ANO 2011	Central Bohemian	
Václav Pláteník	KDU-ČSL	Zlín	
Jiří Pospíšil	TOP 09	Prague	
Marie Pošarová	SPD	Plzeň	
David Pražák	ANO 2011	Liberecký	
Jindřich Rajchl	SPD	Moravian–Silesian	
Vít Rakušan	STAN	Central Bohemian	Leader of Mayors and Independents
Michal Ratiborský	ANO 2011	Moravian–Silesian	
Barbora Rázga	ANO 2011	Prague	
Jan Richter	ANO 2011	Ústí nad Labem	
Olga Richterová	Pirates	Prague	
Pavel Růžička	ANO 2011	Ústí nad Labem	
Drahoslav Ryba	ANO 2011	Vysočina	
Petr Sadovský	ANO 2011	Hradec Králové	
Miroslav Samaš	ANO 2011	Central Bohemian	
Gabriela Sedláčková	AUTO	Olomouc	
Lucie Sedmihradská	STAN	Prague	
Alena Schillerová	ANO 2011	South Moravian	
Vítězslav Schrek	ODS	Vysočina	
Zuzana Schwarz Bařtipánová	ANO 2011	Ústí nad Labem	
Jan Síla	SPD	Moravian–Silesian	
Jan Skopeček	ODS	Central Bohemian	
Štěpán Slovák	ODS	Zlín	
Julie Smejkalová	STAN	Prague	
Petr Sokol	ODS	Olomouc	
Kateřina Stojanová	Pirates	Ústí nad Labem	
Jiří Strýček	ANO 2011	Moravian–Silesian	
Robert Stržínek	ANO 2011	Zlín	
Gabriela Svárovská	Pirates	Prague	
Jan Sviták	STAN	Liberecký	
Jiří Svoboda	ANO 2011	Moravian–Silesian	
Vendula Svobodová	Pirates	South Moravian	
Lucie Šafránková	SPD	South Moravian	
Michaela Šebelová	STAN	Moravian–Silesian	
Miroslav Ševčík	SPD	South Moravian	
Markéta Šichtařová	SPD	Prague	Left the Parliament on 11 March 2026
Martin Šmída	Pirates	Olomouc	Became a Deputy on 5 November 2025, replacing Šárka Kučerová
Eva Šrámková	Pirates	Plzeň	
Boris Šťastný	AUTO	Prague	
David Štolpa	ANO 2011	South Moravian	
František Talíř	KDU-ČSL	South Bohemian	
Róbert Teleky	KDU-ČSL	Zlín	
Václav Trojan	ANO 2011	South Moravian	
Karel Tureček	ANO 2011	South Bohemian	
Filip Turek	AUTO	Central Bohemian	
Libor Turek	ODS	Ústí nad Labem	
Barbora Urbanová	STAN	Central Bohemian	
Vlastimil Válek	TOP 09	South Moravian	
Helena Válková	ANO 2011	Central Bohemian	
Josef Váňa	ANO 2011	Karlovy Vary	
Renata Vesecká	AUTO	Hradec Králové	
Lukáš Vlček	STAN	Vysočina	
Jiří Vojáček	KDU-ČSL	Hradec Králové	
Adam Vojtěch	ANO 2011	South Bohemian	
Jitka Volfová	ANO 2011	Liberecký	
Samuel Volpe	Pirates	Central Bohemian	
Libor Vondráček	SPD	South Bohemian	
Radek Vondráček	ANO 2011	Zlín	
Otto Vopěnka	ANO 2011	Vysočina	
Petr Vrána	ANO 2011	Olomouc	
Marek Výborný	KDU-ČSL	Pardubice	Leader of KDU-ČSL
Ester Weimerová	STAN	Moravian–Silesian	
Lubomír Wenzl	ANO 2011	South Moravian	
Martin Záhoř	ANO 2011	Plzeň	
Renáta Zajíčková	ODS	Prague	
Roman Zarzycký	ANO 2011	Plzeň	Left the Parliament on 3 November 2025
Michal Zuna	TOP 09	Prague	
Pavel Žáček	ODS	Prague	
Miroslav Žbánek	ANO 2011	Olomouc	
Marek Ženíšek	TOP 09	Plzeň	
