= List of MPs elected in the 2021 Czech parliamentary election =

9th Chamber of Deputies of the Czech Republic
←	8th	10th	→
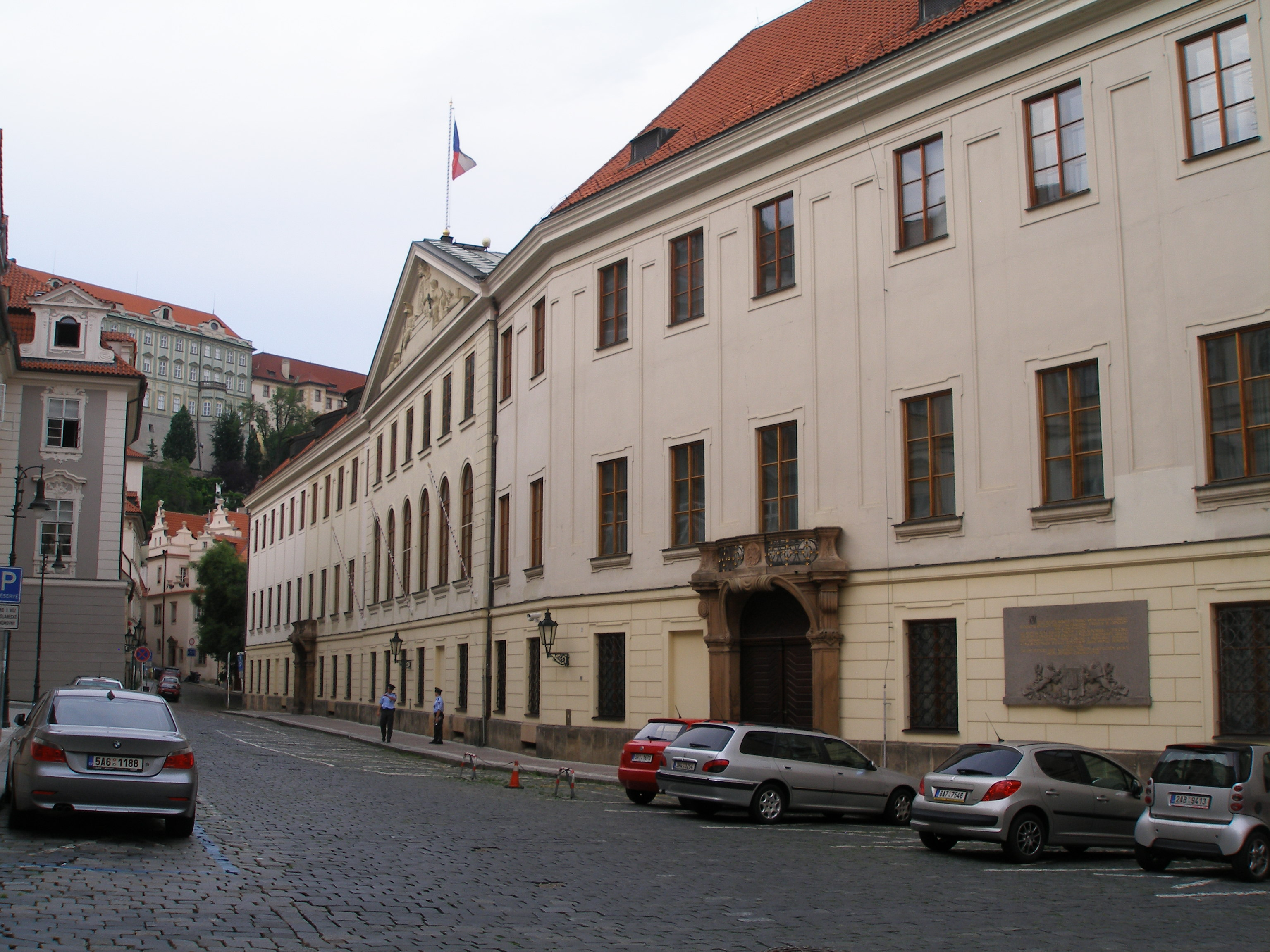

Overview
- Legislative body: Parliament of the Czech Republic
- Jurisdiction: Czech Republic
- Meeting place: Thun Palace
- Term: 8 November 2021 – 3 November 2025
- Election: 2021 Czech legislative election
- Members: 200
- Speaker: Markéta Pekarová Adamová
- Prime Minister: Petr Fiala

The 9th Chamber of Deputies is the assembled legislature of the lower house of the Parliament of the Czech Republic following the election held on 8 and 9 October 2021. All 200 Members of Parliament (MPs) were elected to serve a 4-year term.

== Current composition ==
Below is a graphical representation of the Chamber of Deputies showing a comparison of party strengths as it was directly after the 2017 election. The graphic is not a seating plan.

== List of elected MPs ==
Name	Party	Region	Notes
Ivan Adamec	SPOLU/ODS	Hradec Králové	
Věra Adámková	ANO 2011	Prague	
Andrej Babiš	ANO 2011	Ústí nad Labem	
Andrea Babišová	ANO 2011	Moravian-Silesian	
Ondřej Babka	ANO 2011	South Bohemian	
Jana Bačíková	SPOLU/ODS	South Moravian	
Vladimír Balaš	PirStan/STAN	Prague	
Ivan Bartoš	PirStan/Piráti	Ústí nad Labem	
Jan Bartošek	SPOLU/KDU-ČSL	South Bohemian	
Jaroslav Bašta	SPD	Pardubice	
Jan Bauer	SPOLU/ODS	South Bohemian	
Martin Baxa	SPOLU/ODS	Plzeň	
Petr Beitl	SPOLU/ODS	Liberec	
Josef Bělica	ANO 2011	Moravian-Silesian	
Pavel Bělobrádek	SPOLU/KDU-ČSL	Hradec Králové	
Romana Bělohlávková	SPOLU/KDU-ČSL	Vysočina	
Roman Bělor	PirStan/STAN	Prague	
Marek Benda	SPOLU/ODS	Prague	
Petr Bendl	SPOLU/ODS	Central Bohemian	
Ondřej Benešík	SPOLU/KDU-ČSL	Zlín	
Jan Berki	PirStan/SLK	Liberec	
Jana Berkovcová	ANO 2011	Hradec Králové	
Stanislav Berkovec	ANO 2011	Central Bohemian	
Josef Bernard	PirStan/STAN	Plzeň	
Stanislav Blaha	SPOLU/ODS	Zlín	
Pavel Blažek	SPOLU/ODS	South Moravian	
Richard Brabec	ANO 2011	South Bohemian	
Milan Brázdil	ANO 2011	Olomouc	
Lubomír Brož	ANO 2011	Prague	
Jan Bureš	SPOLU/ODS	Karlovy Vary	
Jaroslav Bžoch	ANO 2011	Ústí nad Labem	
Jiří Carbol	SPOLU/KDU-ČSL	Moravian-Silesian	
Josef Cogan	PirStan/STAN	Hradec Králové	
Jana Černochová	SPOLU/ODS	Prague	
Oldřich Černý	SPD	Central Bohemian	
Eva Decroix	SPOLU/ODS	Vysočina	
Klára Dostálová	ANO 2011	Hradec Králové	
Lenka Dražilová	ANO 2011	South Moravian	
Tomáš Dubský	PirStan/STAN	Pardubice	
Aleš Dufek	SPOLU/KDU-ČSL	Zlín	
Jaroslav Dvořák	SPD	Zlín	
Martin Exner	PirStan/STAN	Central Bohemian	
Jaroslav Faltýnek	ANO 2011	Olomouc	
Kamal Farhan	ANO 2011	Plzeň	
Jan Farský	PirStan/STAN	Liberec	
Milan Feranec	ANO 2011	Olomouc	
Petr Fiala	SPOLU/ODS	South Moravian	
Radim Fiala	SPD	Olomouc	
Eva Fialová	ANO 2011	Ústí nad Labem	
Petr Fifka	SPOLU/ODS	Prague	
Romana Fischerová	ANO 2011	Central Bohemian	
Josef Flek	PirStan/STAN	South Moravian	
Jaroslav Foldyna	SPD	Ústí nad Labem	
Stanislav Fridrich	ANO 2011	Moravian-Silesian	
Petr Gazdík	PirStan/STAN	Zlín	
Pavla Golasowská	SPOLU/KDU-ČSL	Moravian-Silesian	
Karel Haas	SPOLU/ODS	Pardubice	
Jiří Hájek	PirStan/STAN	Pardubic	
Martin Hájek	PirStan/STAN	South Moravian	
Jana Hanzlíková	ANO 2011	Pardubice	
Matěj Ondřej Havel	SPOLU/TOP 09	Hradec Králové	
Karel Havlíček	ANO 2011	Central Bohemian	
Jiří Havránek	SPOLU/ODS	Central Bohemian	
Tomáš Helebrant	ANO 2011	Central Bohemian	
Šimon Heller	SPOLU/KDU-ČSL	South Bohemian	
Igor Hendrych	ANO 2011	Moravian-Silesian	
Jan Hofmann	SPOLU/ODS	Central Bohemian	
Jiří Horák	SPOLU/KDU-ČSL	South Moravian	
Jan Hrnčíř	SPD	South Moravian	
Ivan Jáč	ANO 2011	Liberec	
Jan Jakob	SPOLU/TOP 09	Central Bohemian	
Jakub Janda	SPOLU/ODS	Moravian-Silesian	
Miloslav Janulík	ANO 2011	South Moravian	
Marie Jílková	SPOLU/KDU-ČSL	South Moravian	
Aleš Juchelka	ANO 2011	Moravian-Silesian	
Marian Jurečka	SPOLU/KDU-ČSL	Olomouc	
Vít Kaňkovský	SPOLU/KDU-ČSL	Vysočina	
David Kasal	ANO 2011	Pardubice	
Pavel Kašník	SPOLU/ODS	South Moravian	
Zdeněk Kettner	SPD	Ústí nad Labem	
Pavel Klíma	SPOLU/TOP 09	South Bohemian	
Lenka Knechtová	ANO 2011	South Moravian	
Jiří Kobza	SPD	Prague	
Klára Kocmanová	PirStan/Piráti	Central Bohemian	
Michael Kohajda	SPOLU/KDU-ČSL	Olomouc	
Tomáš Kohoutek	ANO 2011	Ústí nad Labem	
Ondřej Kolář	SPOLU/TOP 09	Prague	
Martin Kolovratník	ANO 2011	Pardubice	
Radek Koten	SPD	Vysočina	
Josef Kott	ANO 2011	Vysočina	
Věra Kovářová	PirStan/STAN	Central Bohemian	
Václav Král	SPOLU/ODS	South Bohemian	
Robert Králíček	ANO 2011	Prague	
Karel Krejza	SPOLU/ODS	Ústí nad Labem	
Jana Krutáková	PirStan/STAN	South Moravian	
Roman Kubíček	ANO 2011	South Bohemian	
Jan Kubík	ANO 2011	South Bohemian	
Michal Kučera	SPOLU/TOP 09	Ústí nad Labem	
Jan Kuchař	PirStan/STAN	Karlovy Vary	
Martin Kukla	ANO 2011	Vysočina	
Martin Kupka	SPOLU/ODS	Central Bohemian	
Jan Lacina	PirStan/STAN	Prague	
Hubert Lang	ANO 2011	Plzeň	
Helena Langšádlová	SPOLU/TOP 09	Central Bohemian	
Vladimíra Lesenská	SPD	Hradec Králové	
Petr Letocha	PirStan/STAN	Moravian-Silesian	
Martina Lisová	SPOLU/TOP 09	Vysočina	
Petr Liška	PirStan/STAN	Ústí nad Labem	
Ondřej Lochman	PirStan/STAN	Central Bohemian	
Ivana Mádlová	ANO 2011	Plzeň	
Martin Major	SPOLU/ODS	Olomouc	
Taťána Malá	ANO 2011	South Moravian	
Karla Maříková	SPD	Karlovy Vary	
Jiří Mašek	ANO 2011	Hradec Králové	
Lubomír Metnar	ANO 2011	Moravian-Silesian	
Jakub Michálek	PirStan/Piráti	Prague	
Jana Mračková Vildumetzová	ANO 2011	Karlovy Vary	
Tomáš Müller	PirStan/STAN	Olomouc	
Vojtěch Munzar	SPOLU/ODS	Central Bohemian	
Patrik Nacher	ANO 2011	Prague	
Hana Naiclerová	PirStan/STAN	Olomouc	
Jiří Navrátil	SPOLU/KDU-ČSL	Moravian-Silesian	
Zdenka Němečková Crkvenjaš	SPOLU/ODS	Moravian-Silesian	
Marek Novák	ANO 2011	Zlín	
Nina Nováková	SPOLU/KDU-ČSL	Central Bohemian	
Miloš Nový	SPOLU/TOP 09	Plzeň	
Monika Oborná	ANO 2011	Vysočina	
Hayato Okamura	SPOLU/KDU-ČSL	Prague	
Tomio Okamura	SPD	Moravian-Silesian	
Ladislav Okleštěk	ANO 2011	Olomouc	
Eliška Olšáková	PirStan/STAN	Zlín	
Michaela Opltová	PirStan/STAN	Plzeň	
Renata Oulehlová	ANO 2011	Karlovy Vary	
Zuzana Ožanová	ANO 2011	Moravian-Silesian	
Jana Pastuchová	ANO 2011	Liberec	
Markéta Pekarová Adamová	SPOLU/TOP 09	Prague	
Berenika Peštová	ANO 2011	Ústí nad Labem	
František Petrtýl	ANO 2011	Central Bohemian	
Tom Philipp	SPOLU/KDU-ČSL	Prague	
Pavla Pivoňka Vaňková	PirStan/STAN	South Bohemian	
Jaroslava Pokorná Jermanová	ANO 2011	Central Bohemian	
Marie Pošarová	SPD	Plzeň	
Lucie Potůčková	PirStan/STAN	Hradec Králové	
David Pražák	ANO 2011	Liberec	
Petra Quittová	PirStan/STAN	South Moravian	
Karel Rais	ANO 2011	South Moravian	
Vít Rakušan	PirStan/STAN	Central Bohemian	
Michael Rataj	PirStan/STAN	Moravian-Silesian	
Michal Ratiborský	ANO 2011	Moravian-Silesian	
Jan Richter	ANO 2011	Ústí nad Labem	
Olga Richterová	PirStan/Piráti	Prague	
Radek Rozvoral	SPD	Central Bohemian	
Pavel Růžička	ANO 2011	Ústí nad Labem	
Drahoslav Ryba	ANO 2011	Vysočina	
Petr Sadovský	ANO 2011	Hradec Králové	
Rudolf Salvetr	SPOLU/ODS	Plzeň	
Alena Schillerová	ANO 2011	South Moravian	
Jan Síla	SPD	Moravian-Silesian	
Jan Skopeček	SPOLU/ODS	Central Bohemian	
Karel Sládeček	SPD	Moravian-Silesian	
Jiří Slavík	SPOLU/TOP 09	Central Bohemian	
Karel Smetana	SPOLU/KDU-ČSL	Olomouc	
Pavel Staněk	SPOLU/ODS	Hradec Králové	
Zbyněk Stanjura	SPOLU/ODS	Moravian-Silesian	
Jiří Strýček	ANO 2011	Moravian-Silesian	
Robert Stržínek	ANO 2011	Zlín	
Bohuslav Svoboda	SPOLU/ODS	Prague	
Pavel Svoboda	SPOLU/TOP 09	Pardubice	
Lucie Šafránková	SPD	South Moravian	
Michaela Šebelová	PirStan/STAN	Moravian-Silesian	
David Šimek	SPOLU/KDU-ČSL	Pardubice	
Julius Špičák	ANO 2011	Central Bohemian	
Iveta Štefanová	SPD	South Bohemian	
David Štolpa	ANO 2011	South Moravian	
Róbert Teleky	SPOLU/KDU-ČSL	Zlín	
Antonín Tesařík	SPOLU/KDU-ČSL	South Moravian	
Karel Tureček	ANO 2011	South Bohemian	
Libor Turek	SPOLU/ODS	Ústí nad Labem	
Barbora Urbanová	PirStan/STAN	Central Bohemian	
Vlastimil Válek	SPOLU/TOP 09	South Moravian	
Helena Válková	ANO 2011	Central Bohemian	
Radovan Vích	SPD	Liberec	
Lukáš Vlček	PirStan/STAN	Vysočina	
Milada Voborská	PirStan/STAN	Prague	
Viktor Vojtko	PirStan/STAN	South Bohemian	
Jan Volný	ANO 2011	Plzeň	
Vít Vomáčka	SPOLU/ODS	Liberec	
Radek Vondráček	ANO 2011	Zlín	
Ivo Vondrák	ANO 2011	Moravian-Silesian	
Petr Vrána	ANO 2011	Olomouc	
Marek Výborný	SPOLU/KDU-ČSL	Pardubice	
Lubomír Wenzl	ANO 2011	South Moravian	
Milan Wenzl	ANO 2011	Prague	
Renáta Zajíčková	SPOLU/ODS	Prague	
Miroslav Zborovský	SPOLU/KDU-ČSL	South Moravian	
Vladimír Zlínský	SPD	Zlín	
Michal Zuna	SPOLU/TOP 09	Prague	
Pavel Žáček	SPOLU/ODS	Prague	
Marek Ženíšek	SPOLU/TOP 09	Plzeň	
