= Havránek =

Havránek (feminine: Havránková) is a Czech surname. It is a diminutive of the word havran, meaning 'rook', and the surname Havran. It likely originated as a nickname for someone with black hair. Notable people with the surname include:

- Bedřich Havránek (1821–1899), Czech painter and illustrator
- Bohuslav Havránek (1893–1978), Czech philologist and literary historian
- František Havránek (1923–2011), Czech football manager
- Ivan Havránek (born 1964), Czech figure skater
- Jiří Havránek (born 1992), Czech politician
- Tomáš Havránek (born 1998), Czech ice hockey player
