= Sládeček =

Sládeček, female Sládečková, is a Czech surname. Notable people with the surname include:

- Eva Sládečková (1923–2016), Czechoslovak basketball and handball player
- Hana Sládečková (born 1992), Czech floorball player, national team member and Czech champion.
- Karel Sládeček (born 1963), Czech politician
- Svatopluk Sládeček (born 1969), Czech architect
