= Neoconservatism in the Czech Republic =

The Czech Republic, like other post-communist European states, has had a fairly consistent pro-American foreign policy. This pro-Americanism makes Neoconservatism (Czech: neokonzervatismus) in Europe more likely in post-communist European states. While other states in Europe have become hostile towards US policy since the 2003 invasion of Iraq the states of Central Europe (termed "new Europe" by Donald Rumsfeld) joined the American "coalition of the willing" in Iraq, contributing much-needed international legitimacy. The Bush administration has praised these states as sharing America's values and remembering the hardships of totalitarian regimes".

Many of the Czech politicians involved with the Velvet Revolution and the transition from communism to democracy express similar foreign policy views to American Neoconservatives. There are also many key Czech politicians affiliated to Neoconservative think tanks and organisations. Examples of these organisations include the Prague Security Studies Institute, an organisation which co-hosted the Neoconservative Democracy and Security International Conference.

According to Jenni Schaller:

Neoconservatism, as a strain of political thought in the United States, has been represented as "distinctly American" and Irving Kristol, often considered the "godfather" of neoconservatism, emphatically states "[t]here is nothing like neoconservatism in Europe" (Kristol 2003: 33). Analyst Jeffrey Gedmin writes that the "environment for neoconservatism as such is an inhospitable one" in Europe, especially Germany (Gedmin 2004: 291). The states of Central Europe, in contrast to many of the established continental EU members, represent a rather more pro-American stance. With groups of former dissidents whose political leanings are in part informed by the American anticommunist, pro-democracy policies of the 1970s and 1980s.

Schaller argues that:

After the collapse of the communist regime in late 1989, the new government consisted mainly of former dissidents and some who had not been active dissenters, but had not been active party members either. In comparison with Slovakia, many more Czech dissidents with no previous political or even professional experience were willing to assume not only legislative, but also executive posts (Ucen 1999: 85). Václav Havel provides the most striking example, but quite a few other politically inexperienced former dissidents took important positions, especially within the first few post-1989 governments. Without exaggerating the influence of former dissidents in the post-communist era, I assume that their presence in the government, cabinet, and extragovernmental research does have an (at least limited) impact on policies, as well as public opinion.

== Democracy & Security International Conference ==
The Democracy & Security International Conference, also known as the "Democracy and Security: Core Values and Sound Policies" conference, was held in Prague on the 5–6 June, overlapping the 2007 G8 summit in Heiligendamm. Held in Prague and co-hosted by the Prague Security Studies Institute the meeting was described by Jim Lobe as "Neoconservative International".

Czech politicians at the meeting include Dana Baschová, Pavel Bém, Antonín Berdych, Rudolf Blažek, Jan Bubeník, Oldřich Černý, Václav Havel and Karel Schwarzenberg.
