= Skopeček =

Skopeček, female Skopečková, is a Czech surname. Notable people with the surname include:

- Jan Skopeček (actor) (1925–2020), Czech actor and playwright
- Jan Skopeček (politician) (born 1980), Czech politician
