= Neoconservatism (disambiguation) =

Neoconservatism is an ideological political movement.

Neoconservativism may refer to:

== Influenced by the US movement ==
- Neoconservatism in the Czech Republic
- British neoconservatism

== Other meanings ==
- German neo-conservative movement
- Neoauthoritarianism (China)
- Neoconservatism in Iran, also referred to as "ultraconservatism".
- Neoconservatism in Japan

== See also ==
- Neoliberalism
