= Jan Skopeček =

Jan Skopeček may refer to:

- Jan Skopeček (actor)
- Jan Skopeček (politician)
