= Havran =

Havran may refer to:

- Havran (surname)
- Havran, Ottoman district in southern Syria encompassing Jabal al-Druze.
- Havran, Balıkesir, a district of Balıkesir Province in Turkey
- A peak in the Tatra Mountains, Slovakia
- A peak in the Upper Palatine Forest in the Czech Republic
- Havraň, a village in the Czech Republic
