= Jiří Svoboda (ANO politician, born 1989) =

Czech politician (born 1989)

Member of the Chamber of Deputies of the Czech Republic
- Incumbent
- Assumed office 4 October 2025
- Constituency: Moravian-Silesian Region

Personal details
- Born: 12 March 1989 (age 37) Pardubice, Czechoslovakia
- Party: ANO
- Education: University of West Bohemia

Jiří Svoboda (born 12 March 1989) is a Czech politician from the ANO party. He was elected to the Chamber of Deputies in the 2025 Czech parliamentary election.

== See also ==
- List of MPs elected in the 2025 Czech parliamentary election
