= Katerina Demetrashvili =

Czech politician (born 2003)

- Demetrashvili in 2026

Member of the Chamber of Deputies of the Czech Republic
- Incumbent
- Assumed office October 4, 2025
- Constituency: Prague

Personal details
- Born: April 5, 2003 (age 23) San Antonio, Texas, U.S.
- Party: Czech Pirate Party (2024–)
- Education: Charles University

Katerina Demetrashvili (born April 5, 2003) is a Czech politician. A member of the Czech Pirate Party, she was elected to the Chamber of Deputies in the 2025 Czech parliamentary election.

== Biography ==
Demetrashvili was born in Texas to a Georgian family, and has lived in the Czech Republic since she was one year old. Her father serves as a sniper in the Georgian Legion in the Russo-Ukrainian war. She attended Charles University after graduating from the Music High School in Prague where she led the school parliament. Demetrashvili is a law student and vice-chairwoman of Young Pirates. She is the youngest Pirate elected in the 2025 election.

== Controversies ==
In October 2025, Demetrashvili received media attention after the online publication of Twitter posts from 2020 and 2021, which included references to drug use and pornography. She described the tweets as adolescent humor, and said she had never taken the drugs mentioned.

In a television interview, Demetrashvili criticized Marek Benda for his 25 years of experience as a member of Chamber of Deputies, saying "Who can political lizard Marek Benda possibly represent when he is so inexperienced and has been sitting in the Chamber of Deputies since he was 21?" A spokesperson for the Civic Democratic Party responded that she should show "humility" given her young age at the time of her election. In the same interview, Demetrashvili described the Russian-Ukrainian war as a means of economic enrichment for the Czech Republic. Her position was criticized by former PM Jiří Paroubek and some foreign journalists.

== Personal life ==
In April 2026, when Demetrashvili was 23 years old, it was reported that Demetrashvili was dating the 50-year-old former chief of the Military Police Otakar Foltýn.

== See also ==
- List of MPs elected in the 2025 Czech parliamentary election
