= Drahomír Blažej =

Czech politician (born 1962)

Member of the Chamber of Deputies of the Czech Republic
- Incumbent
- Assumed office 4 October 2025
- Constituency: Central Bohemian Region

Personal details
- Born: 4 March 1962 (age 64)
- Party: KSČ; ANO 2011

Drahomír Blažej (born 4 March 1962) is a Czech politician from the ANO 2011. He was elected to the Chamber of Deputies in the 2025 Czech parliamentary election.

== Biography ==
Blažej is transport pilot by profession. He was a member of the Communist Party of Czechoslovakia from 1987 to 1989.

== See also ==
- List of MPs elected in the 2025 Czech parliamentary election
