= Senate district 2 – Sokolov =

Electoral district in the Czech Republic

Coordinates: 50°09′39″N 12°44′02″E

2 – Sokolov
- inline Senate district of the Czech Republic

- The Sokolov district on a map
- Senator: Jana Mračková Vildumetzová; ANO
- Region: Karlovy Vary
- District: Sokolov; Karlovy Vary; Cheb
- Electorate: 97156
- Area: 1,134.52
- Last election: 2024
- Next election: 2030

Senate district 2 – Sokolov is an electoral district of the Senate of the Czech Republic, composing of the Sokolov District and parts of the Cheb District and Karlovy Vary District. From 2024, the Senator for the district is Jana Mračková Vildumetzová from ANO 2011.

== Senators ==
Senators for the district 2 – Sokolov
| Year | Senator | Party |
|---|---|---|
| 1996 (Note: Election for shortened four-year term) | Jiří Vyvadil | ČSSD |
| 2000 | Jan Hadrava | US |
| 2006 | Pavel Čáslava | ODS |
| 2012 | Zdeněk Berka | ČSSD |
| 2018 | Miroslav Balatka | STAN |
| 2024 | Jana Mračková Vildumetzová | ANO |

== Election results ==
=== 1996 ===
1996 Czech Senate election in Sokolov (Note: As this was the first ever election to the Senate of the Czech Republic, Senator was elected only for four-year term.)
| Candidate | Party | 1st round | | 2nd round | |
| Candidate | Party | Votes | % | Votes | % |
|---|---|---|---|---|---|
| Jiří Vyvadil | ČSSD | 5 586 | 27,03 | 11 398 | 55,04 |
| Josef Michalský | ODS | 6 926 | 33,51 | 9 312 | 44,96 |
| Jana Strnadová | KSČM | 2 680 | 12,97 | — | — |
| Jan Hadrava | Independent | 1 828 | 8,85 | — | — |
| Pavel Čáslavský | KDU-ČSL | 1 362 | 6,59 | — | — |
| Irena Nádherná | SŽJ | 903 | 4,37 | — | — |
| Jiří Dytrych | ČSNS | 751 | 3,63 | — | — |
| Zdeněk Most | DEU | 630 | 3,05 | — | — |
| ČSSD win (new seat) | | | | | |

=== 2000 ===
2000 Czech Senate election in Sokolov
| Candidate | Party | 1st round | | 2nd round | |
| Candidate | Party | Votes | % | Votes | % |
|---|---|---|---|---|---|
| Jan Hadrava | US (Note: Part of 4KOALICE coalition) | 6 060 | 27,49 | 6 320 | 54,78 |
| Karel Černík | ODS | 5 099 | 23,13 | 5 215 | 45,21 |
| Ladislav Mrázek | KSČM | 4 514 | 20,48 | — | — |
| Rudolf Macháček | ČSSD | 3 687 | 16,72 | — | — |
| Stanislav Svoboda | Independent | 2 679 | 12,15 | — | — |
| US gain from ČSSD | | | | | |

=== 2006 ===
2006 Czech Senate election in Sokolov
| Candidate | Party | 1st round | | 2nd round | |
| Candidate | Party | Votes | % | Votes | % |
|---|---|---|---|---|---|
| Pavel Čáslava | ODS | 7 895 | 29,47 | 7 368 | 50,95 |
| Josef Novotný | ČSSD | 6 628 | 24,74 | 7 093 | 49,04 |
| Josef Hora | HNHRM | 4 856 | 18,13 | — | — |
| Ladislav Mrázek | KSČM | 3 730 | 13,92 | — | — |
| Milan Gebouský | SZ | 1 590 | 5,93 | — | — |
| Petr Zahradníček | KONS (Note: In a coalition with SNK ED) | 947 | 3,63 | — | — |
| Štefan Kanaloš | NEZ | 724 | 2,70 | — | — |
| ODS gain from US | | | | | |

=== 2012 ===
2012 Czech Senate election in Sokolov
| Candidate | Party | 1st round | | 2nd round | |
| Candidate | Party | Votes | % | Votes | % |
|---|---|---|---|---|---|
| Zdeněk Berka | ČSSD | 6 364 | 29,21 | 5 373 | 56,68 |
| Jiří Holan | KSČM | 4 688 | 21,52 | 4 106 | 43,31 |
| Karel Jakobec | ODS | 3 615 | 16,59 | — | — |
| Jiří Pánek | Svobodní | 2 109 | 9,68 | — | — |
| Petr Zahradníček | TOP 09 (Note: In a coalition with STAN) | 2 043 | 9,37 | — | — |
| Jaroslav Bradáč | SPOZ | 1 061 | 4,87 | — | — |
| Věra Ježková | VV | 1 058 | 4,85 | — | — |
| David Carvan | NÁR.SOC. | 843 | 3,87 | — | — |
| ČSSD gain from ODS | | | | | |

=== 2018 ===
2018 Czech Senate election in Sokolov
| Candidate | Party | 1st round | | 2nd round | |
| Candidate | Party | Votes | % | Votes | % |
|---|---|---|---|---|---|
| Miroslav Balatka | STAN (Note: Supported by TOP 09 and Pirates) | 7 497 | 28,74 | 6 902 | 59,47 |
| Renata Oulehlová | ANO | 6 708 | 25,72 | 4 703 | 40,52 |
| Jan Picka | ČSSD | 4 588 | 17,59 | — | — |
| Eva Valjentová | KSČM | 2 332 | 8,94 | — | — |
| Petr Nimrichter | SPD | 1 553 | 5,95 | — | — |
| Josef Zickler | ŘN - VU | 1 172 | 4,49 | — | — |
| Stanislav Pochman | KAN | 1 001 | 3,83 | — | — |
| Jiří Korbel | Independent | 848 | 3,13 | — | — |
| Jan Teplík | ČS | 410 | 1,57 | — | — |
| STAN gain from ČSSD | | | | | |

=== 2024 ===
2024 Czech Senate election in Sokolov
| Candidate | Party | 1st round | |
| Candidate | Party | Votes | % |
|---|---|---|---|
| Jana Mračková Vildumetzová | ANO | 11 424 | 50,72 |
| Miroslav Balatka | STAN (Note: Supported by KDU-ČSL and Pirates) | 5 723 | 25,41 |
| Jan Picka | VOK | 2 626 | 11,65 |
| Josef Vaněk | SPD (Note: In a coalition with Tricolour) | 1 173 | 5,20 |
| Alexandr Terek | MÍSTNÍ HNHRM | 833 | 3,69 |
| Dana Wittnerová | SRDCEM PRO … | 743 | 3,29 |
| ANO gain from STAN | | | |
