= Benjamin Činčila =

Czech politician (born 1996)

Member of the Chamber of Deputies of the Czech Republic
- Incumbent
- Assumed office 4 October 2025
- Constituency: Vysočina Region

1st Vice-Chairman of KDU-ČSL
- Incumbent
- Assumed office 24 April 2026
- Preceded by: Pavel Bělobrádek

Personal details
- Born: 26 January 1996 (age 30)
- Party: KDU-ČSL
- Education: Prague University of Economics and Business

Benjamin Činčila (born 26 January 1996) is a Czech politician from the KDU-ČSL. He was elected to the Chamber of Deputies in the 2025 Czech parliamentary election.

== Biography ==
Činčila is an economist who was chief analyst of the Ministry of Labour and Social Affairs. He was head of the party's youth wing.

On 24 April 2026, Činčila was elected 1st Vice-Chairman in a KDU-ČSL leadership election, with 239 out of 264 votes, being the only candidate.

== See also ==
- List of MPs elected in the 2025 Czech parliamentary election
