= Adriana Chochelová =

Czech politician (born 1997)

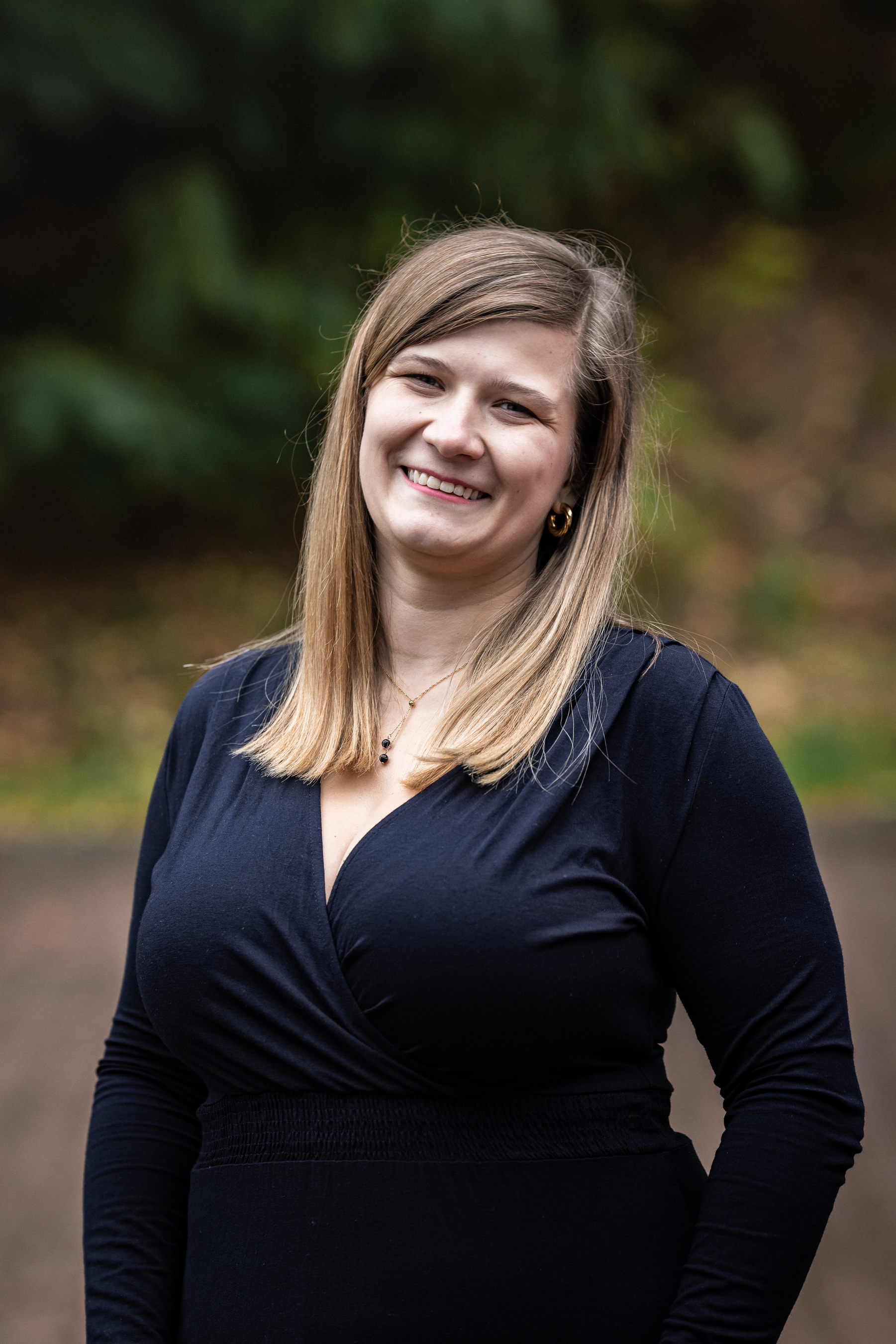
- Adriana Chochelová in 2025

Member of the Chamber of Deputies
- Incumbent
- Assumed office 4 October 2025
- Constituency: Central Bohemian Region

Personal details
- Born: 25 December 1997 (age 28) Prague, Czech Republic
- Party: Mayors and Independents
- Education: Charles University

Adriana Chochelová (born 25 December 1997) is a Czech politician serving as a member of the Chamber of Deputies since 2025. She previously served as assistant to Barbora Urbanová.
