= Prague Security Studies Institute =

Nonprofit organization

Prague Security studies Institute
- Abbreviation: PSSI
- Formation: 2022
- Type: NGO, nonprofit
- Headquarters: Prague, Czech Republic
- Website: pssi.cz

The Prague Security Studies Institute (PSSI, Czech: Pražský Institut Bezpečnostnich Studii; PIBS) is a non-profit, nongovernmental organization established in early 2002 to advance the building of a just, secure, democratic and free-market society in the Czech Republic and other post-communist states. PSSI analyzes select foreign policy and security-related concerns in regional and transatlantic relations and proposes policy responses. It also hosts regular roundtables and conferences. The primary areas of focus for PSSI's research are space security, economic and financial security, and threats to the information environment in the CEE and Western Balkans.

== History ==
In 1997, the National Security Assessments Program (NSA) was established as an entity within the Civic Institute, one of the Czech Republic’s first non-profit policy groups following the Velvet Revolution. The initial focus of the NSA Program was to enrich the national and regional debates with respect to the security-related dimensions of post-communist governance. Over a two-year period, the NSA Program made substantial progress in informing and influencing the largely underdeveloped national security policy agenda of the Czech Republic.

The NSA Program, headed by Roger W. Robinson Jr. and Petr Vančura, convened three annual conferences. The first conference, "NATO and Central European Security in the 21st Century" held in April 1999, was held on the fiftieth anniversary of NATO. The second conference, "A Tenth Anniversary Assessment of Central European Freedoms" took place in April 2000. The third, "Trans-Atlantic Missile Defense and Security Cooperation," took place in April 2001.

Speakers from roughly eight Western and Central European countries and the US attended each of these annual conferences.

In 2000, the NSA Program was spun off from the Civic Institute to create The Bell Association for Freedom and Democracy. In the following two years, the concept of a national security-oriented training program for future policy practitioners evolved and led to the founding of the Prague Security Studies Institute (PSSI) in early 2002. PSSI was led by former Czech National Security advisor and Director of the Foreign Intelligence Service, Oldřich Černý and Roger W. Robinson Jr., who also served as Co-Founders of the Institute.

== Corporate Council Program (CCP) ==
The Corporate Council Program was established in the fall of 2003, Chaired by William F. Martin. The Program offers PSSI students the benefits of integrating into their academic course load the management and decision-making skills of leading business executives from across the globe.
