= Jiří Vojáček =

Czech politician (born 1966)

Member of the Chamber of Deputies of the Czech Republic
- Incumbent
- Assumed office 4 October 2025
- Constituency: Hradec Králové Region

Personal details
- Born: 16 March 1966 (age 60) Frýdek-Místek, Czechoslovakia
- Party: KDU-ČSL
- Education: Palacký University Olomouc

Jiří Vojáček (born 16 March 1966) is a Czech politician from the KDU-ČSL. He was elected to the Chamber of Deputies in the 2025 Czech parliamentary election.

== Biography ==
Vojáček is a schoolteacher by profession.

== See also ==
- List of MPs elected in the 2025 Czech parliamentary election
