= Denis Doksanský =

Czech politician (born 1973)

Member of the Chamber of Deputies of the Czech Republic
- Incumbent
- Assumed office 4 October 2025
- Constituency: Hradec Králové Region

Personal details
- Born: 27 August 1973 (age 52)
- Party: ANO

Denis Doksanský (born 27 August 1973) is a Czech politician from the ANO party. He was elected to the Chamber of Deputies in the 2025 Czech parliamentary election.

== Biography ==
Doksanský is a school teacher by profession.

== See also ==
- List of MPs elected in the 2025 Czech parliamentary election
