= Lucie Sedmihradská =

Czech politician (born 1974)

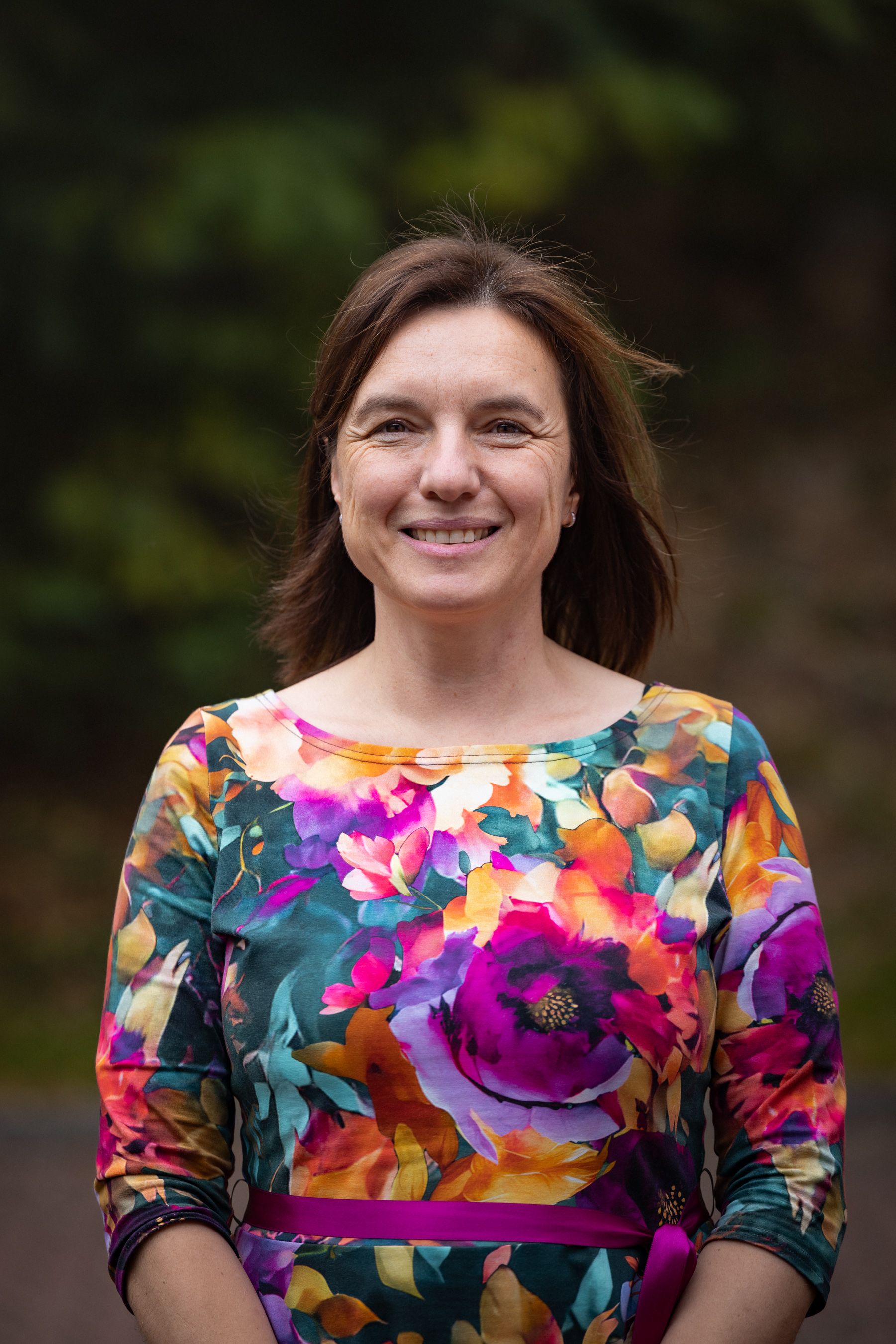

Member of the Chamber of Deputies of the Czech Republic
- Incumbent
- Assumed office 4 October 2025
- Constituency: Prague

Personal details
- Born: 14 September 1974 (age 52)
- Party: Mayors and Independents
- Education: Prague University of Economics and Business

Lucie Sedmihradská (born 14 September 1974) is a Czech politician. A member of the Mayors and Independents, she was elected to the Chamber of Deputies in the 2025 Czech parliamentary election.

== See also ==
- List of MPs elected in the 2025 Czech parliamentary election
