= Štěpán Slovák =

Czech politician (born 1998)

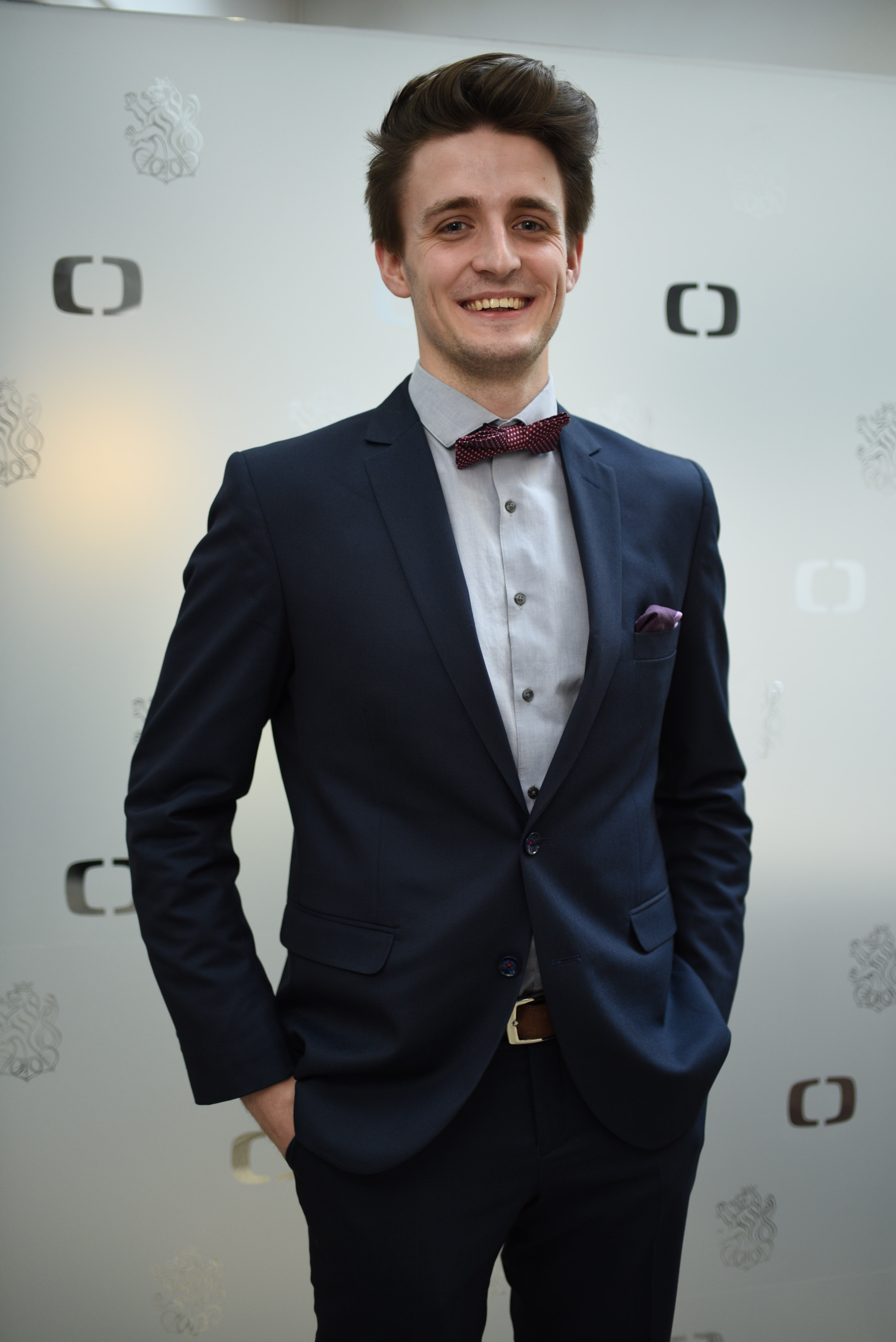

Member of the Chamber of Deputies of the Czech Republic
- Incumbent
- Assumed office 4 October 2025
- Constituency: Zlín Region

Personal details
- Born: 15 April 1998 (age 28) Zlín, Czech Republic
- Party: Civic Democratic Party (2016–)
- Education: Charles University
- Website: www.stepanslovak.cz

Štěpán Slovák (born 15 April 1998) is a Czech politician from the Civic Democratic Party. He was elected to the Chamber of Deputies in the 2025 Czech parliamentary election.

== Biography ==
Slovák is a lawyer by profession.

== See also ==
- List of MPs elected in the 2025 Czech parliamentary election
