= Jitka Gruntová =

Czech politician (1945–2026)

Member of the Chamber of Deputies of the Czech Republic
- In office 15 June 2002 – 15 June 2006

Personal details
- Born: 8 May 1945 Blansko, Czechoslovakia
- Died: 9 January 2026 (aged 80) Brno, Czech Republic
- Party: KSČM
- Education: Jan Evangelista Purkyně University
- Occupation: Historian

Jitka Gruntová (8 May 1945 – 9 January 2026) was a Czech politician. A member of the Communist Party of Bohemia and Moravia, she served in the Chamber of Deputies from 2002 to 2006.

Gruntová died in Brno on 9 January 2026, at the age of 80.
