= Renata Vesecká =

Czech judge and prosecutor

Renata Vesecká MP
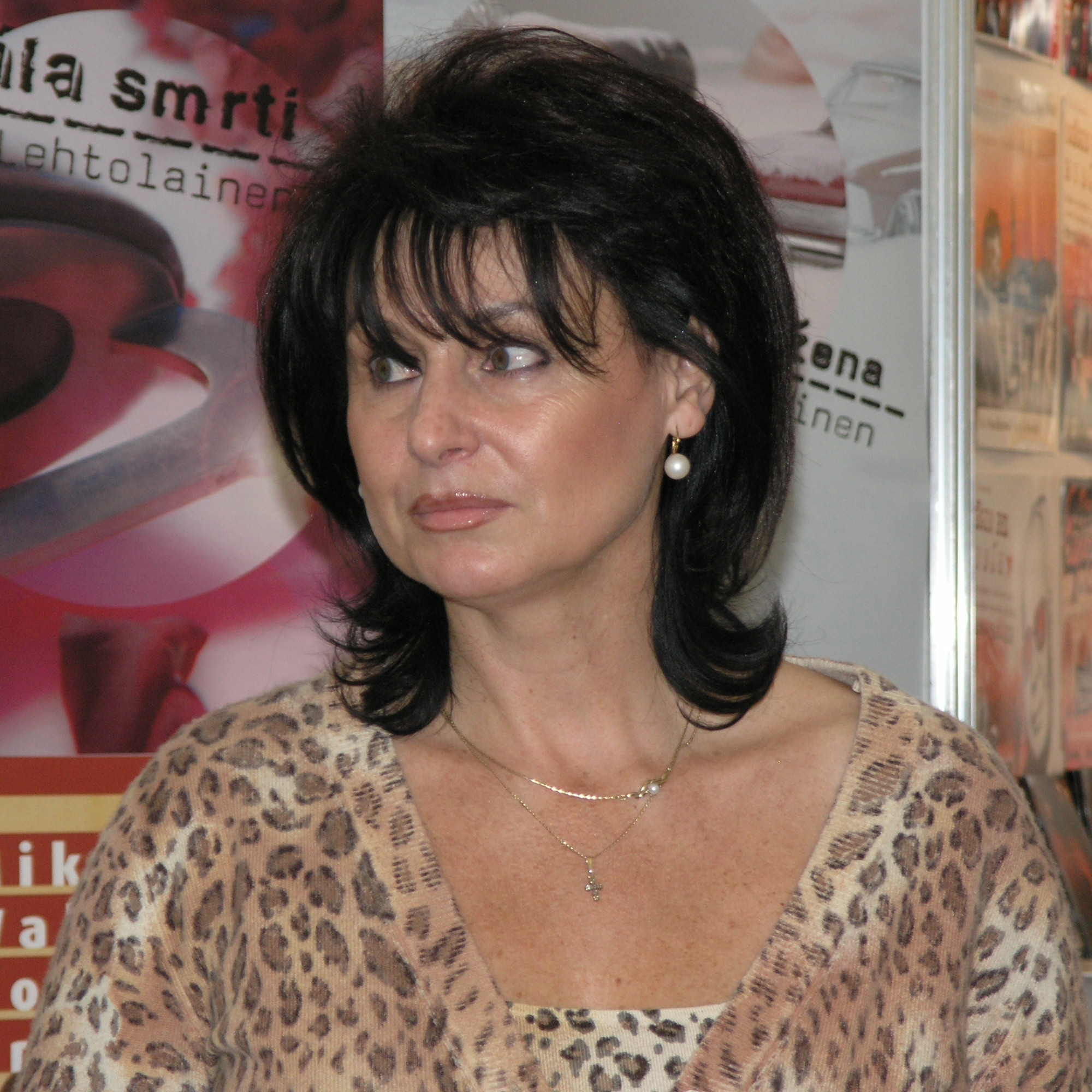
- Renata Vesecká in 2009

4th Prosecutor General of the Czech Republic
- In office 9 November 2005 – 31 December 2010
- Preceded by: Marie Benešová
- Succeeded by: Pavel Zeman

Member of the Chamber of Deputies
- Incumbent
- Assumed office 4 October 2025

Personal details
- Born: 27 March 1960 (age 66) Prague, Czechoslovakia (now Czech Republic)
- Party: Independent (nominated by AUTO) (2025–present)
- Education: Charles University
- Occupation: lawyer; politician

Renata Vesecká (born 27 March 1960) is a Czech politician, lawyer and former prosecutor who served as State Attorney for the Czech Republic from 2005 to 2010.

Vesecká ran as an independent candidate in the 2025 Czech parliamentary election with the Motorists for Themselves party. She was elected as the lead candidate for the party list in the Hradec Králové Region.
