= Vlastislav Antolák =

Czech teacher and politician (1942–2023)

- Official parliament portrait

Member of the Chamber of Deputies of the Czech Republic
- In office 15 June 2002 – 15 June 2006
- Constituency: Zlín Region

Personal details
- Born: 27 April 1942
- Died: 7 March 2023 (aged 80)
- Party: KSČM
- Occupation: Teacher

Vlastislav Antolák (27 April 1942 – 7 March 2023) was a Czech teacher and politician. A member of the Communist Party of Bohemia and Moravia, he served in the Chamber of Deputies from 2002 to 2006.

Antolák died on 7 March 2023, at the age of 80.
