= Ivo Vykydal =

Czech politician (1964–2020)

- Born: 1 October 1964
- Died: 27 September 2020 (aged 55)

Ivo Vykydal (1 October 1964 – 27 September 2020) was a Czech politician who served as a Deputy in the Chamber of Deputies of the Czech Republic.

== Career ==
He was elected to the Chamber of Deputies of the Czech Republic in 2002 as a member of KDU-ČSL. In 2007, he switched parties and joined the newly formed TOP 09. From 2007 to 2012, he was Deputy Minister of Transport. After 2012, he worked at the State Fund for Transport Infrastructure.

He was the president of Inclusion Europe in 2010–2011.
