= Miroslav Krejčí =

Czech politician (born 1979)

Member of the Chamber of Deputies
- Incumbent
- Assumed office 4 October 2025
- Constituency: South Bohemian Region

Personal details
- Born: 18 December 1979 (age 46) Czechoslovakia
- Party: Independent (nominated by Motorists for Themselves)
- Education: Czech Technical University in Prague

Miroslav Krejčí (born 18 December 1979) is a Czech politician serving as a member of the Chamber of Deputies for Motorists for Themselves since 2025. From 2022 to 2024, he served as director of CERMAT.
