= Petr Krill =

Czech politician (1941–2026)

Member of the Chamber of Deputies of the Czech Republic
- In office 15 June 2002 – 3 June 2010

Mayor of Šumperk
- In office 1994 – 14 November 2002
- Preceded by: Ctirad Medlík
- Succeeded by: Zdeněk Brož

Personal details
- Born: 27 May 1941 Ráječek, Protectorate of Bohemia and Moravia
- Died: 21 January 2026 (aged 84)
- Party: ODS
- Education: Technical University of Liberec
- Occupation: Engineer

Petr Krill (27 May 1941 – 21 January 2026) was a Czech politician. A member of the Civic Democratic Party, he served in the Chamber of Deputies from 2002 to 2010.

Krill died on 21 January 2026, at the age of 84.
