= Julie Smejkalová =

Czech politician (born 2004)

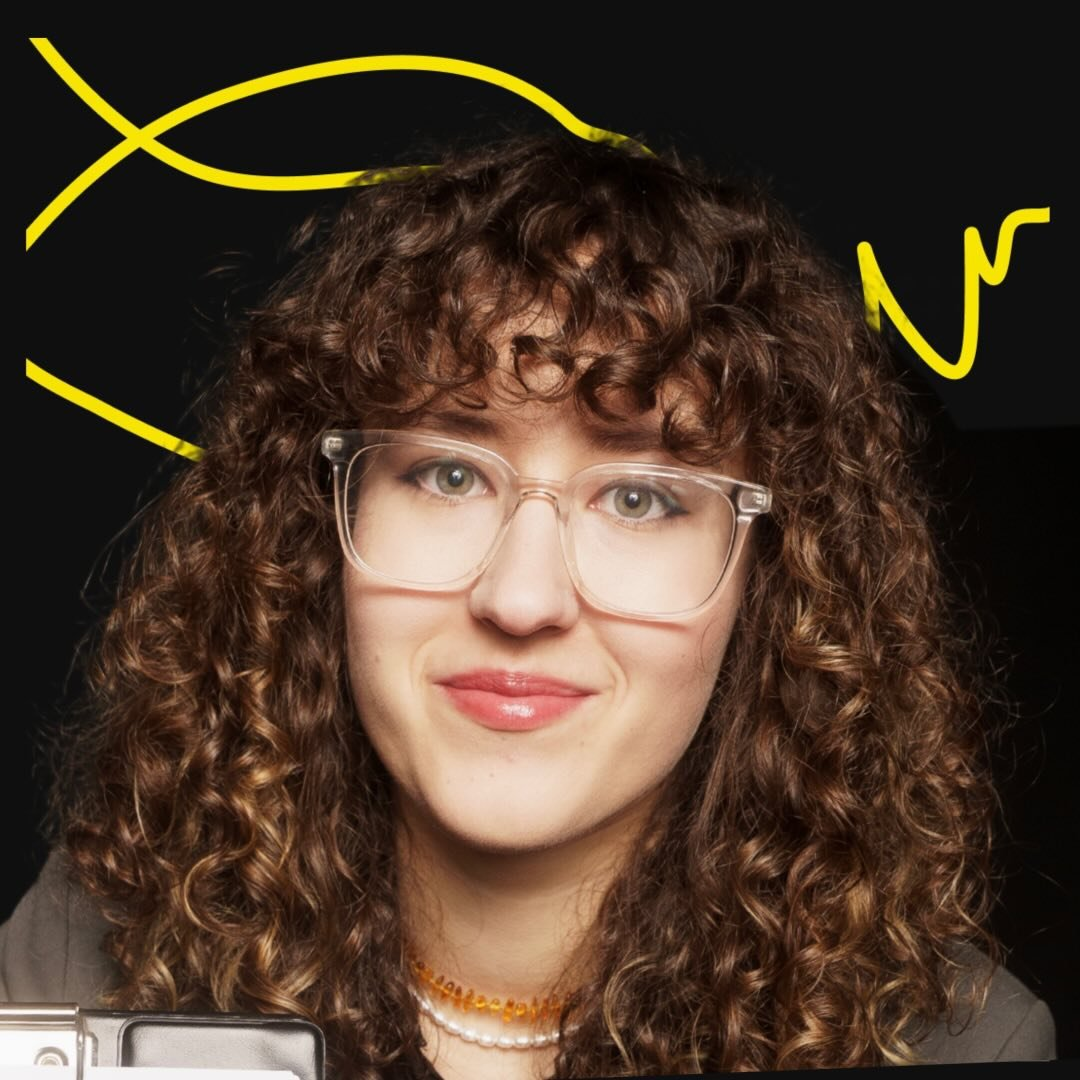
- Smejkalová in 2025

Member of the Chamber of Deputies
- Incumbent
- Assumed office 4 October 2025
- Constituency: Prague

Personal details
- Born: 12 July 2004 (age 21) Prague, Czech Republic
- Party: Mayors and Independents

Julie Smejkalová (born 12 July 2004) is a Czech politician from STAN serving as a member of the Chamber of Deputies since 2025. She is the youngest current member of the Chamber.
