= Havran (surname) =

Havran (feminine: Havranová) is a Czech and Slovak surname, meaning 'rook'. It likely originated as a nickname for someone with black hair. The diminutive form of the name is Havránek. Notable people with the surname include:

- Mária Bartalos, née Havranová (born 1994), Slovak actress
- Matěj Havran (born 2002), Czech handball player
- Wendy Havran (1955–2020), American immunologist
