= Anežka Nedomová =

Czech politician (born 2001)

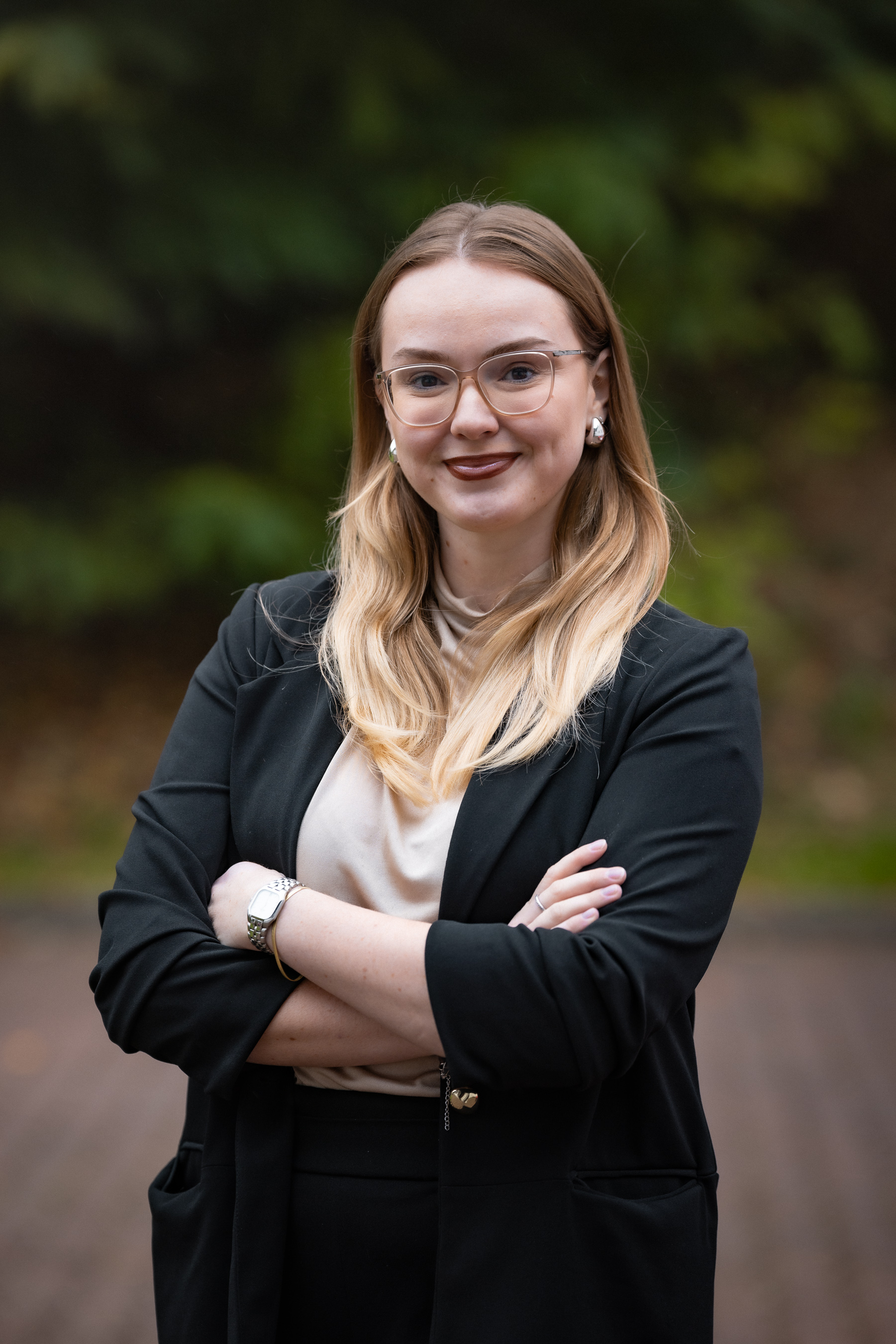

Member of the Chamber of Deputies
- Incumbent
- Assumed office 4 October 2025
- Constituency: Pardubice Region

Personal details
- Born: 30 January 2001 (age 25) Czech Republic
- Party: Mayors and Independents (since 2025)

Anežka Nedomová (born 30 January 2001) is a Czech politician serving as a member of the Chamber of Deputies since 2025. She has been a member of Mayors and Independents since 2025.

== Early life and education ==
Nedomová studied German language at the University of Pardubice from 2021 to 2024, where she earned her Bachelor's degree. Following her undergraduate studies, she enrolled in a Master's program in German Language and Literature at the Faculty of Arts of Masaryk University in Brno in 2024.

== Professional career ==
Between 2020 and 2021, Nedomová worked in the call center for the Generali pension company. From June to October 2023, she served as an interpreter for the multinational technology company Carl Zeiss AG in Jena, Germany, focusing on near-native level translation between Czech and German.

From 2023 to 2024, she worked as a German language teacher at the Sunrise Language Agency, primarily teaching children aged four and older.

== Political career ==
In the 2025 Czech legislative election, Nedomová ran as a candidate for the Mayors and Independents (STAN) party in the Pardubice Region. Although originally placed 5th on the party list, she received 3,176 preferential votes (representing 10.07% of the party's total votes in the region). Under the Czech electoral system, this allowed her to jump to the 1st position on the list, securing her election to the Chamber of Deputies of the Czech Republic.

== Personal life ==
Nedomová resides in Pardubice.
