= Miloslava Vostrá =

Czech politician (born 1965)

Miloslava Vostrá (born 26 May 1965 in Kladno, Czechoslovakia) is a Czech politician, from 2002 to 2021 she was a member of Chamber of Deputies of the Parliament of the Czech Republic. She is in KSČM (Communist Party of Bohemia and Moravia) and was from 2009 to 2016 deputy chairman of KSČM.
