= Petr Pleva =

Czech politician (1959–2026)

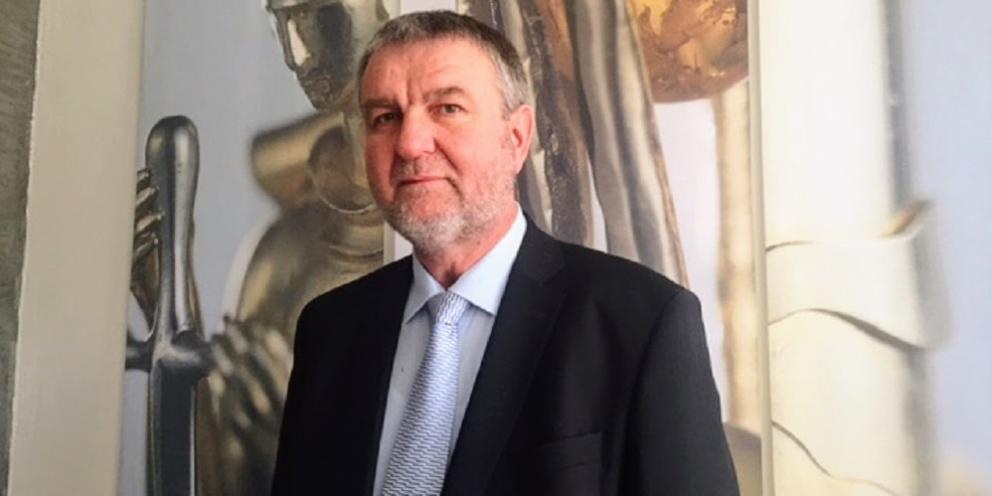

Personal details
- Born: 13 June 1959 Brno, Czechoslovakia
- Died: 31 March 2026 (aged 66)

Petr Pleva (13 June 1959 – 31 March 2026) was a Czech politician.

== Life and career ==
Pleva was born in Brno on 13 June 1959.

In 1992 he was a member of the Chamber of People of the Federal Assembly, from 2002 to 2014 and again from 2018 to 2026 a representative of the Brno-Vinohrady city district, a member of the ODS. He was a member of the Chamber of Deputies of the Czech Republic (1996–2010).

Pleva died on 31 March 2026, at the age of 66.
