= Hana Orgoníková =

Czech politician

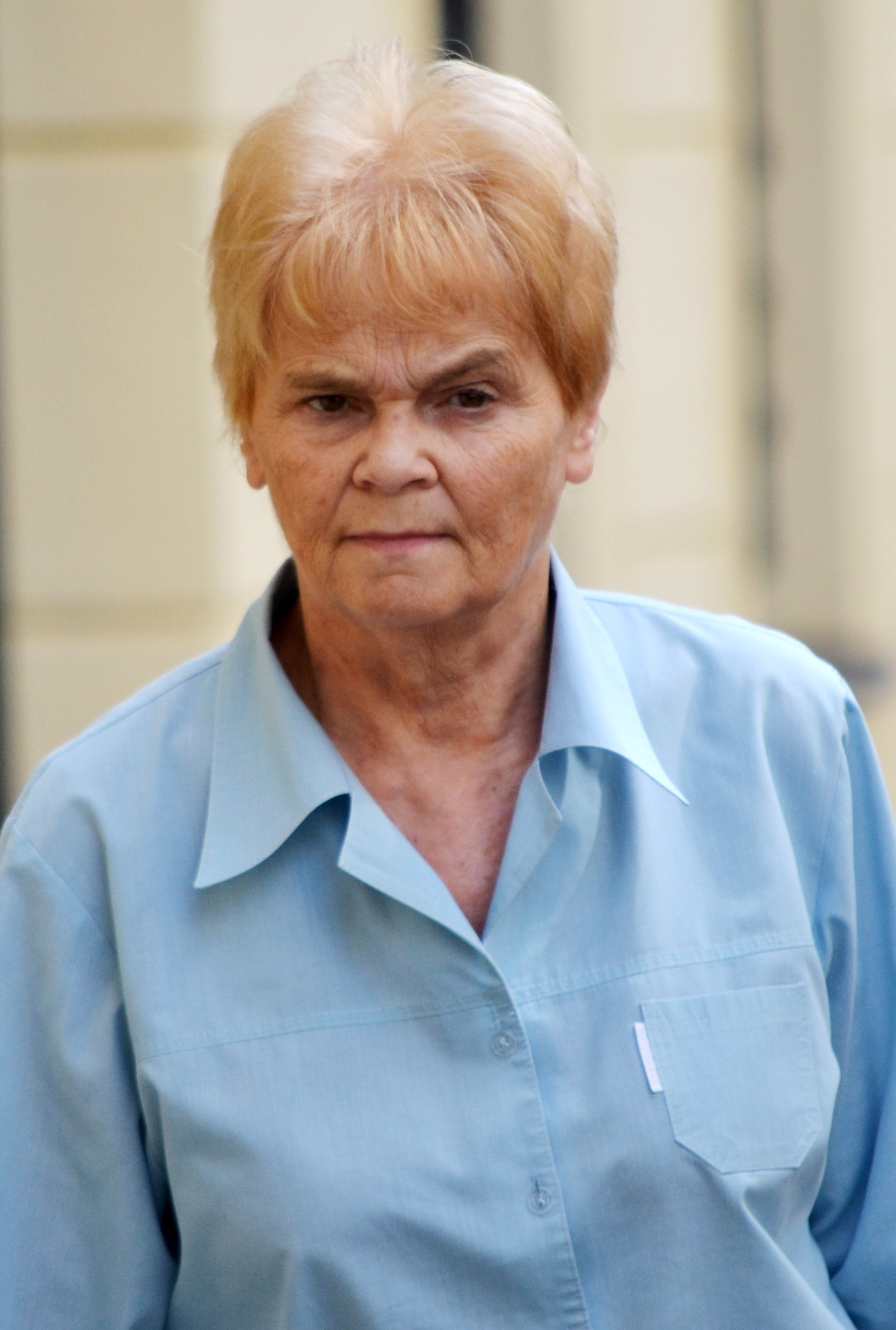
- Hana Orgoníková in August 2013

Vice-Chair of the Czechoslovak Socialist Party
- In office 1993–1993

Member of the Chamber of Deputies of the Czech Republic
- In office 1992–2013

Personal details
- Born: 8 December 1946 Přibyslav, Czechoslovakia
- Died: 5 June 2014 (aged 67) Hradec Králové, Czech Republic
- Party: ČSS (until 1993); ČSSD (from 1994)

Hana Orgoníková (8 December 1946 – 5 June 2014) was a Czech politician. She was an MP for the Czech Social Democratic Party (ČSSD) from 1989 until her death.

Orgoníková was born in Přibyslav, Czechoslovakia. She was divorced and had two children, Vladimír and Lucie.

Orgoníková died following a long illness on 5 June 2014 in Hradec Králové, Czech Republic, aged 67.

== Other websites ==
- Hana Orgoníková at Parlament České republiky, Poslanecká sněmovna (in Czech)
