= Samuel Volpe =

Czech politician (born 2001)

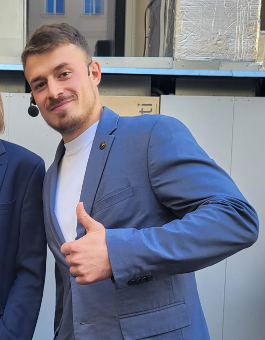
- Volpe in 2025

Member of the Chamber of Deputies
- Incumbent
- Assumed office 4 October 2025
- Constituency: Central Bohemian Region

Personal details
- Born: 20 August 2001 (age 24) Brandýs nad Labem-Stará Boleslav, Czech Republic
- Party: Pirate Party (2020–)

Samuel Volpe (born 20 August 2001) is a Czech politician serving as a member of the Chamber of Deputies since 2025. He is the chairman of the Pirate Party in the Central Bohemian Region.
