= Karel Beran =

Czech diplomat and politician (born 1966)

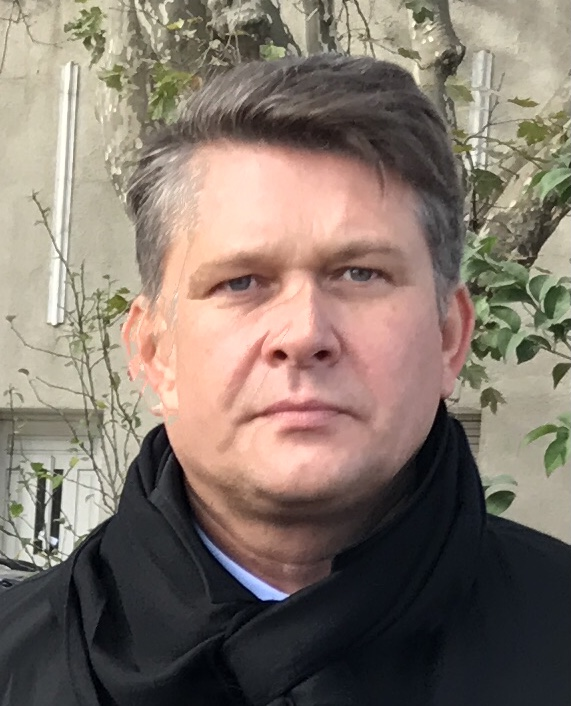
- Beran in 2017

Member of the Chamber of Deputies
- In office 4 October 2025 – 29 May 2026
- Succeeded by: Libor Forman
- Constituency: Vysočina Region

Personal details
- Born: 22 June 1966 (age 60) Prague, Czechoslovakia
- Party: Independent (nominated by AUTO) (2025–present)
- Education: Czech University of Life Sciences Prague

Karel Beran (born 22 June 1966) is a Czech diplomat and politician who served as a member of the Chamber of Deputies from October 2025 to May 2026. He has served as ambassador to Argentina, Paraguay and Uruguay since 2016. From 2009 to 2014, he served as ambassador to Spain and as permanent delegate to UN Tourism.
