= Lucie Bartošová =

Czech politician (born 2000)

Member of the Chamber of Deputies
- Incumbent
- Assumed office 4 October 2025
- Constituency: Liberec Region

Personal details
- Born: 3 March 2000 (age 26)
- Party: Civic Democratic Party

Lucie Bartošová (born 3 March 2000) is a Czech politician serving as a member of the Chamber of Deputies since 2025. She is a student of political science at Masaryk University.
