= Tomáš Kvapil =

Czech politician (1955–2022)

Member of the Chamber of Deputies of the Czech Republic
- In office 20 June 1998 – 3 June 2010

Minister of Regional Development
- In office 12 May 1997 – 2 January 1998
- Prime Minister: Václav Klaus
- Preceded by: Jaromír Schneider
- Succeeded by: Jan Černý

Personal details
- Born: 18 December 1955 Olomouc, Czechoslovakia
- Died: 28 November 2022 (aged 66)
- Party: KDU-ČSL
- Education: Brno University of Technology; Masaryk University

Tomáš Kvapil (18 December 1955 – 28 November 2022) was a Czech politician. A member of KDU-ČSL, he served as Minister of Regional Development from 1997 to 1998 and served in the Chamber of Deputies from 1998 to 2010.

Kvapil died on 28 November 2022, at the age of 66.
