= Jana Mračková Vildumetzová =

Czech politician (born 1973)

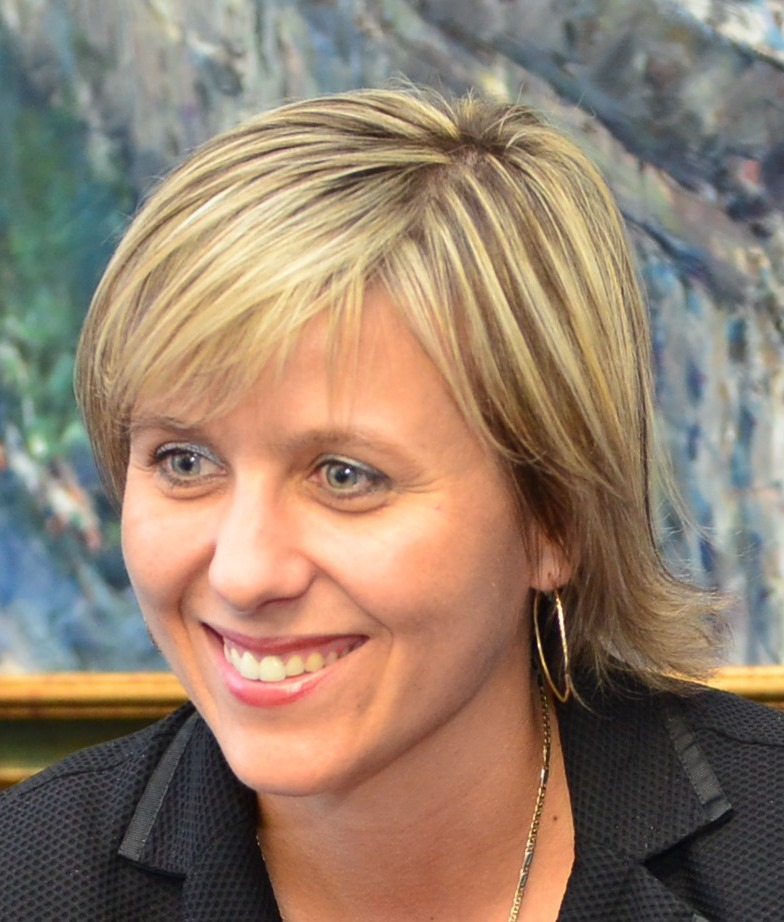
- Mračková Vildumetzová in 2015

Governor of the Karlovy Vary Region
- In office 1 November 2024 – 4 November 2025
- Preceded by: Petr Kulhánek
- Succeeded by: Petr Kubiš
- In office 22 November 2016 – 31 December 2019
- Preceded by: Martin Havel
- Succeeded by: Petr Kubis

Member of the Chamber of Deputies
- In office 21 October 2017 – 21 September 2024

Deputy President of the Chamber of Deputies
- In office 10 November 2021 – 30 September 2022

Senator from Sokolov
- Incumbent
- Assumed office 21 September 2024
- Preceded by: Miroslav Balatka

Personal details
- Born: Jana Vildumetzová; 8 May 1973 (age 53) Karlovy Vary, Czechoslovakia
- Party: ANO (since 2015)
- Other political affiliations: Civic Democratic (2008–2014)
- Education: Jan Evangelista Purkyně University

Jana Mračková Vildumetzová (born 8 May 1973) is a Czech politician. From 2016 to 2019 and from 2024 to 2025 she served as governor of the Karlovy Vary Region. She has been a member of the Senate since 2024. From 2017 to 2024, she was a member of the Chamber of Deputies. From 2006 to 2013, she served as mayor of Horní Slavkov.
