= Vladimíra Lesenská =

Czech politician

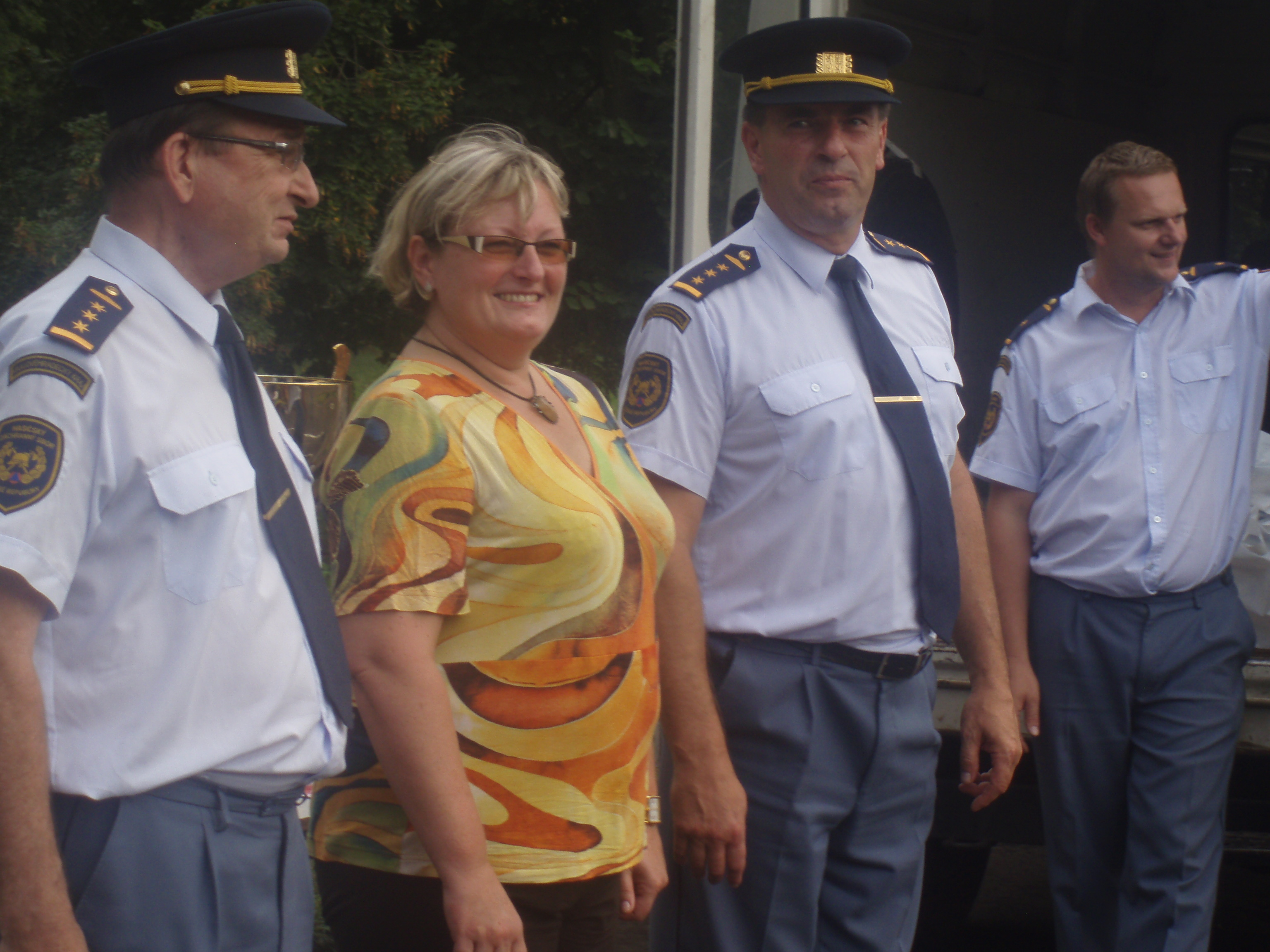
- Vladimíra Lesenská at the KHK Fire and Rescue Service competition in 2012

Member of the Chamber of Deputies
- In office 3 June 2006 – 28 August 2013
- In office 9 October 2021 – 8 October 2025

Personal details
- Born: 28 May 1964 (age 62) Opočno, Czech Republic
- Party: ČSSD (1994–2016); HOZK (2016–2018); SPD (2021–present)
- Education: ČVUT

Vladimíra Lesenská (born 28 May 1964) is a Czech politician who has served two terms in the Chamber of Deputies.

== Biography ==
Lesenská is a civil engineer and graduated with a degree in engineering at the Czech Technical University in Prague. In 1994, she was elected as a municipal councilor for the Czech Social Democratic Party (CSSD) in Týniště nad Orlicí and held this position until 2016 when she left the party. She was also an MP in the Chamber of Deputies for the CSSD from 2006 to 2013 for the Hradec Králové region. In 2020, she joined the Freedom and Direct Democracy party and unsuccessfully stood for the party in the Senate. However, she stood in the 2021 Czech parliamentary election for the party and returned to the Chamber of Deputies. She is also the regional chairwoman of the SPD in Hradec Králové.
