= Iveta Štefanová =

Czech surgeon and politician

Iveta Štefanová (born 27 November 1983) is a Czech surgeon, politician for the Freedom and Direct Democracy (SPD) party and former member of Chamber of Deputies.

Štefanová was born in Zliv. She first joined the SPD in 2016 and was elected to the Chamber of Deputies of the Czech Republic in 2021 for the South Bohemia constituency list. In politics, she focuses on matters related to health.
