= Vladimír Zlínský =

Czech politician

Member of the Chamber of Deputies
- In office 9 October 2021 – 8 October 2025

Personal details
- Born: 29 May 1964 (age 62)
- Party: SPD (since 2020)
- Education: Masaryk University

Vladimír Zlínský (born 29 May 1964) is a Czech politician, medical doctor and a former member of the Chamber of Deputies for the Freedom and Direct Democracy party from 2021 to 2025.

== Biography ==
Zlínský studied medicine at Masaryk University before working as a medical doctor specialising in otorhinolaryngology. He worked at hospitals in Zlín, Kroměříž and Uherské Hradiště, before running a private clinic in Otrokovice. In the municipal elections in 2020, he was elected a representative of the city of Zlín for the Freedom and Direct Democracy movement. During the 2021 Czech parliamentary election, he was elected to the Chamber of Deputies.
