= Jan Síla =

Czech neurosurgeon and politician

Jan Síla MP

Member of the Chamber of Deputies
- Incumbent
- Assumed office 9 October 2021

Personal details
- Born: 1 February 1950 (age 76) Czech Republic
- Party: KSČ (1982–1989); ANO 2011 (2012–2013); Change (2014–2016); Change For Life (2016–2020); SPD (2020–present)
- Education: Palacký University Olomouc

Jan Síla (born March 1, 1950) is a Czech neurosurgeon and politician.

== Professional career ==
Síla is a graduate of the Palacký University Olomouc. From 1993 to 2010 he worked as the head of the neurosurgical department at Ostrava City Hospital. He now runs a private neurosurgical clinic.

== Politics ==
Síla was a member of the ANO 2011 movement and chaired the regional association of the movement in Ostrava. He then joined the smaller Political Change Movement party and founded the Change For Life movement. In 2020, it was announced he would stand as a candidate for the Freedom and Direct Democracy party in the upcoming parliamentary election. In the 2021 Czech parliamentary election, he ran for the SPD movement in 2nd place as a candidate in the Moravia Region and was elected to parliament.
