= Ondřej Babka =

Czech politician (born 1994)

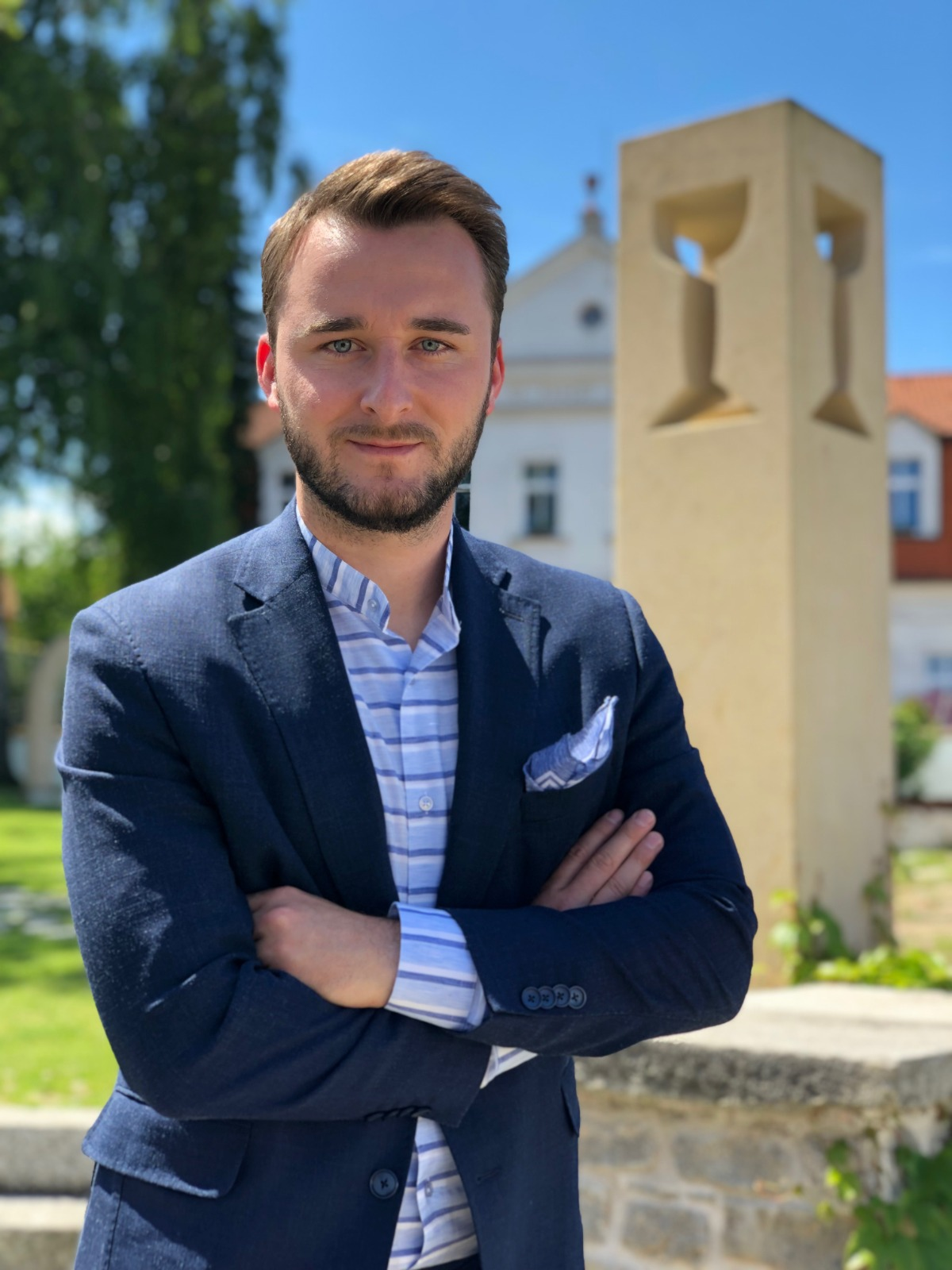
- Babka in 2019

Member of the Chamber of Deputies
- Incumbent
- Assumed office 2 July 2019
- Preceded by: Radka Maxová
- Constituency: South Bohemian Region

Personal details
- Born: 22 February 1994 (age 32) Prague, Czech Republic
- Party: ANO (since 2017)
- Parent: Pavel Babka (father)
- Education: Prague University of Economics and Business

Ondřej Babka (born 22 February 1994) is a Czech politician serving as a member of the Chamber of Deputies since 2019. He has been a member of the Parliamentary Assembly of the Council of Europe since 2024.
