= Marie Pošarová =

Czech politician (born 1980)

Marie Pošarová MP

Member of the Chamber of Deputies
- Incumbent
- Assumed office 9 October 2021

Personal details
- Born: 5 January 1980 (age 46) Domažlice, Czechoslovakia
- Party: Mayors and Independents (2014); Freedom and Direct Democracy (2015–present)

Marie Pošarová (born 5 January 1980) is a Czech politician and a member of the Chamber of Deputies for the Freedom and Direct Democracy party.

== Biography ==
Pošarová graduated with degrees in adult pedagogy and economics at Comenius University and the Czech University of Life Sciences Prague. She subsequently worked as a financial analyst.

She became a non-affiliated supporter of the Dawn of Direct Democracy party before joining Mayors and Independents (STAN) in 2014. She unsuccessfully ran for the party in Měčín Town Council. Pošarová subsequently joined Freedom and Direct Democracy (SPD) in 2015. In the 2021 Czech parliamentary election, she ran as a member of the SPD movement and as a candidate leader in the Plzeň Region. She received 1,657 preferential votes and became a Member of Parliament. She has also been a member of Plzeň regional council for the SPD since 2020.
