= Karel Sládeček =

Czech politician

Karel Sládeček (born 30 May 1963) is a Czech politician for the Freedom and Direct Democracy (SPD) party.

== Biography ==
Sládeček was born in Ostrava. In the 1980s, he lived in Prague and was an opera singer for the Vít Nejedlý Army Art Ensemble. He later returned to Ostrava, where he worked in a number of jobs including as a driving school instructor before studying for a master's degree in social work at the University of Ostrava and worked for a health insurance company.

He became a member of the Party of Civic Rights (SPO), and in 2016 was elected as a regional councilor in Moravia on the joint SPO-SPD list. He later became a member of the SPD, and was elected as an MP for that party in the 2021 legislative elections, for the Moravian-Silesian Region.
