= Oldřich Černý =

Czech politician

Member of the Chamber of Deputies
- In office 9 October 2021 – 8 October 2025

Personal details
- Born: 10 September 1965 (age 61) Czech Republic
- Party: SPD (since 2016)

Oldřich Černý (born 10 September 1965) is a Czech politician and former member of the Chamber of Deputies for the Freedom and Direct Democracy (SPD) party from 2021 to 2025. He was first elected in 2021 for the Central Bohemia region and was second place on the SPD's list. He was also the deputy mayor of Kladno.
