= Jiří Havránek =

Czech politician (born 1992)

Member of the Chamber of Deputies
- Incumbent
- Assumed office 9 October 2021
- Constituency: Central Bohemian Region

Personal details
- Born: 23 December 1992 (age 33)
- Party: Civic Democratic Party
- Education: Prague University of Economics and Business

Jiří Havránek (born 23 December 1992) is a Czech politician serving as a member of the Chamber of Deputies since 2021. He has been a municipal councillor of Bratčice since 2018.
