= Barbora Urbanová =

Czech politician

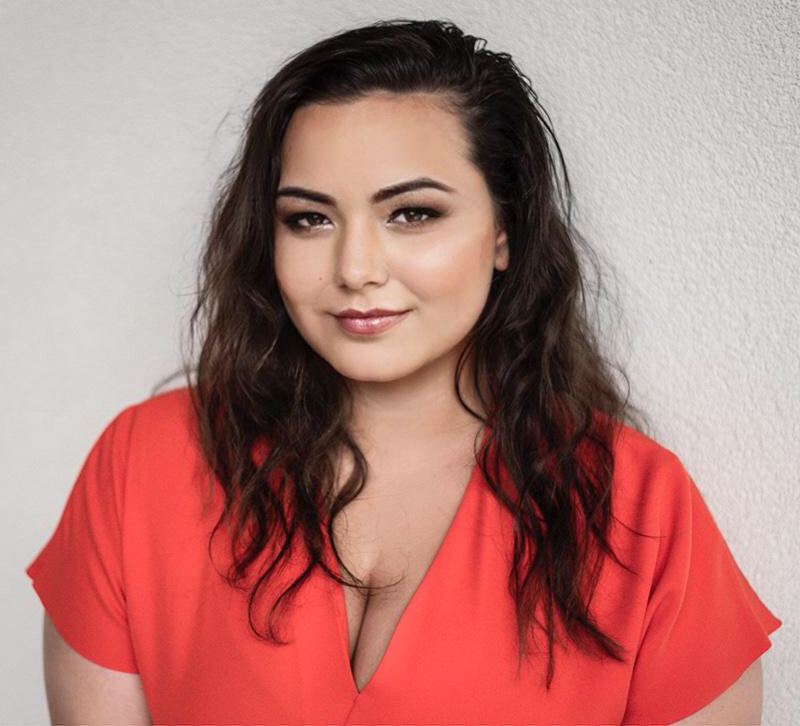

Member of the Chamber of Deputies of the Czech Republic
- Incumbent
- Assumed office 9 October 2021

Deputy President of the Chamber of Deputies
- Incumbent
- Assumed office 5 June 2026

Councillor of Dolní Břežany
- In office 6 October 2018 – 24 September 2022

Personal details
- Born: 26 September 1991 (age 35) Prague, Czechoslovakia
- Party: Mayors and Independents (since 2021)
- Education: Prague University of Economics and Business

Barbora Urbanová (born 26 September 1991) is a Czech politician, member of the Chamber of Deputies of the Czech Republic since October 2021 for Mayors and Independents (STAN) party.

From 2018 to 2022, she served as a councillor of Dolní Břežany.

== Early life and education ==
From 2010 to 2018, Urbanová studied political science at the Prague University of Economics and Business.

At the age of 19, Urbanová began teaching English. She later worked as an assistant to the chairman of the Mayors and Independents (STAN) party, Vít Rakušan, in the Chamber of Deputies of the Czech Republic. From 2018 to 2021, she served as the director of the Institute for Modern Politics iSTAR.

Urbanová lives in Dolní Břežany.

== Political career ==
In the 2018 Czech municipal elections, Urbanová was elected as a councillor of Dolní Břežany, running as an independent on the Mayors and Independents list "ROZKVĚT (STAN)". In the 2022 Czech municipal elections, she ran again for the council of Dolní Břežany, but did not retain her seat.

In the 2021 Czech parliamentary election, Urbanová ran for the Chamber of Deputies of the Czech Republic as a member of Mayors and Independents on the 12th place of the Pirates and Mayors coalition list in the Central Bohemian Region. She was elected to the Chamber of Deputies, finishing fourth due to receiving 19,969 preferential votes.

On 5 June 2026, Urbanová was elected deputy president of the Chamber of Deputies.
