= Jan Skopeček (politician) =

Czech economist and politician

Jan Skopeček MP
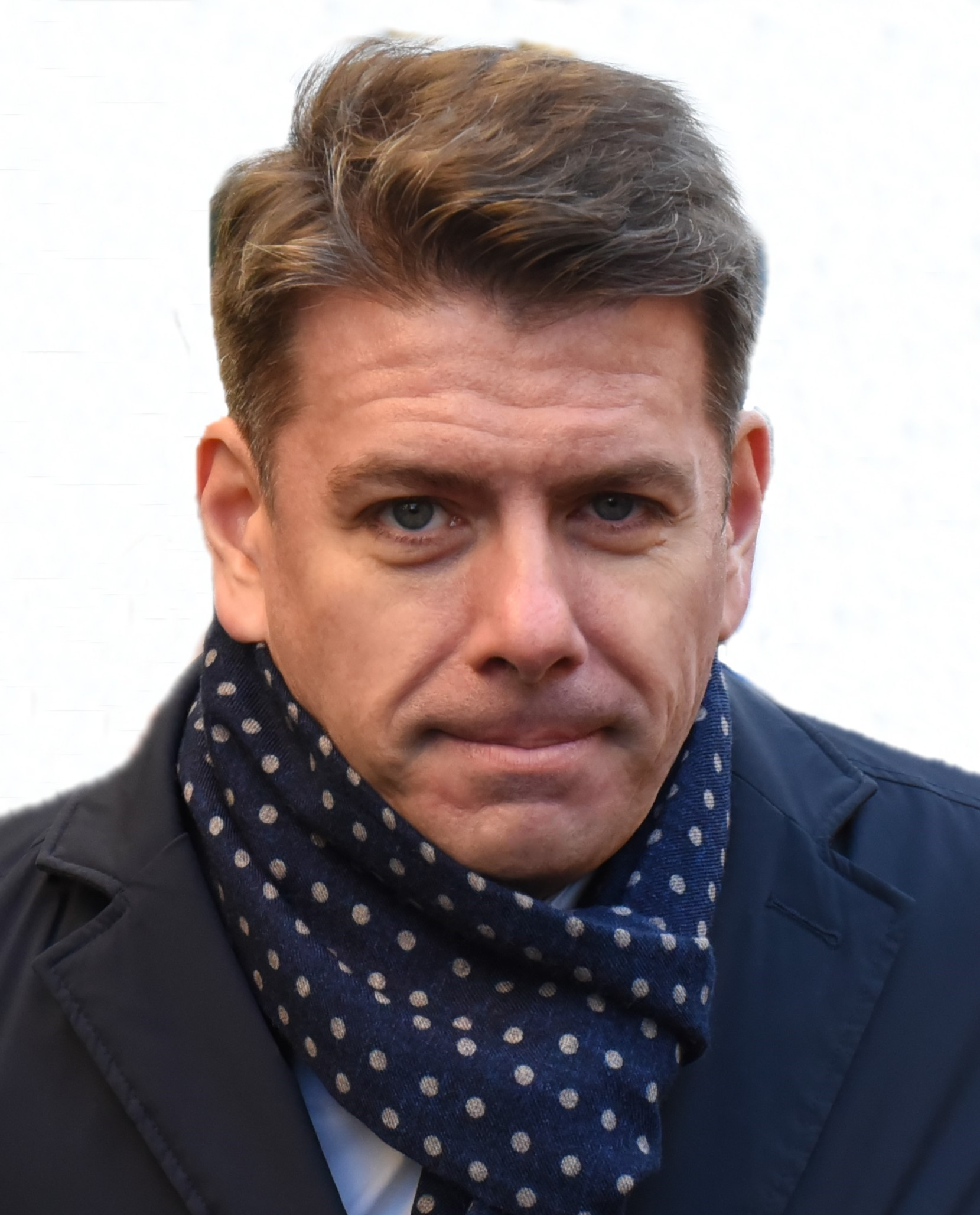
- Skopeček in 2023

Deputy President of the Chamber of Deputies
- In office 10 November 2021 – 8 October 2025
- Incumbent
- Assumed office 14 November 2025

Member of the Chamber of Deputies
- Incumbent
- Assumed office 14 March 2017

Personal details
- Born: 21 October 1980 (age 45) Hořovice, Czechoslovakia (now Czech Republic)
- Party: ODS
- Spouse: Lucie Skopečková

Jan Skopeček (born 21 October 1980) is a Czech Civic Democratic politician who has been a member of the Chamber of Deputies (MP) since March 2017 and deputy president of the Chamber of Deputies since November 2025. He was deputy president of the Chamber of Deputies from 2021 to 2025.
