= 2009 Christian and Democratic Union – Czechoslovak People's Party leadership election =

Czech political party leadership election

- 30 May 2009
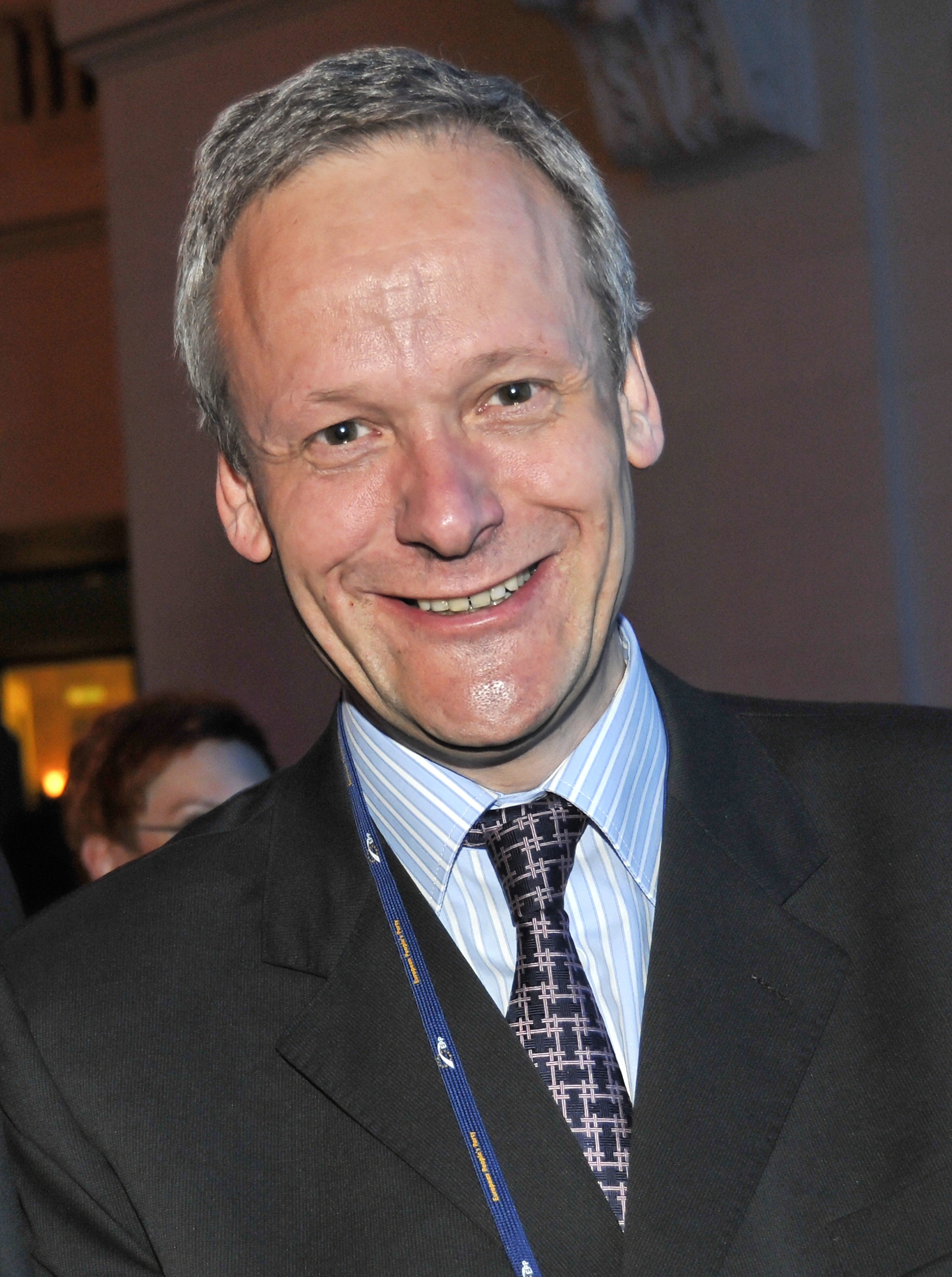

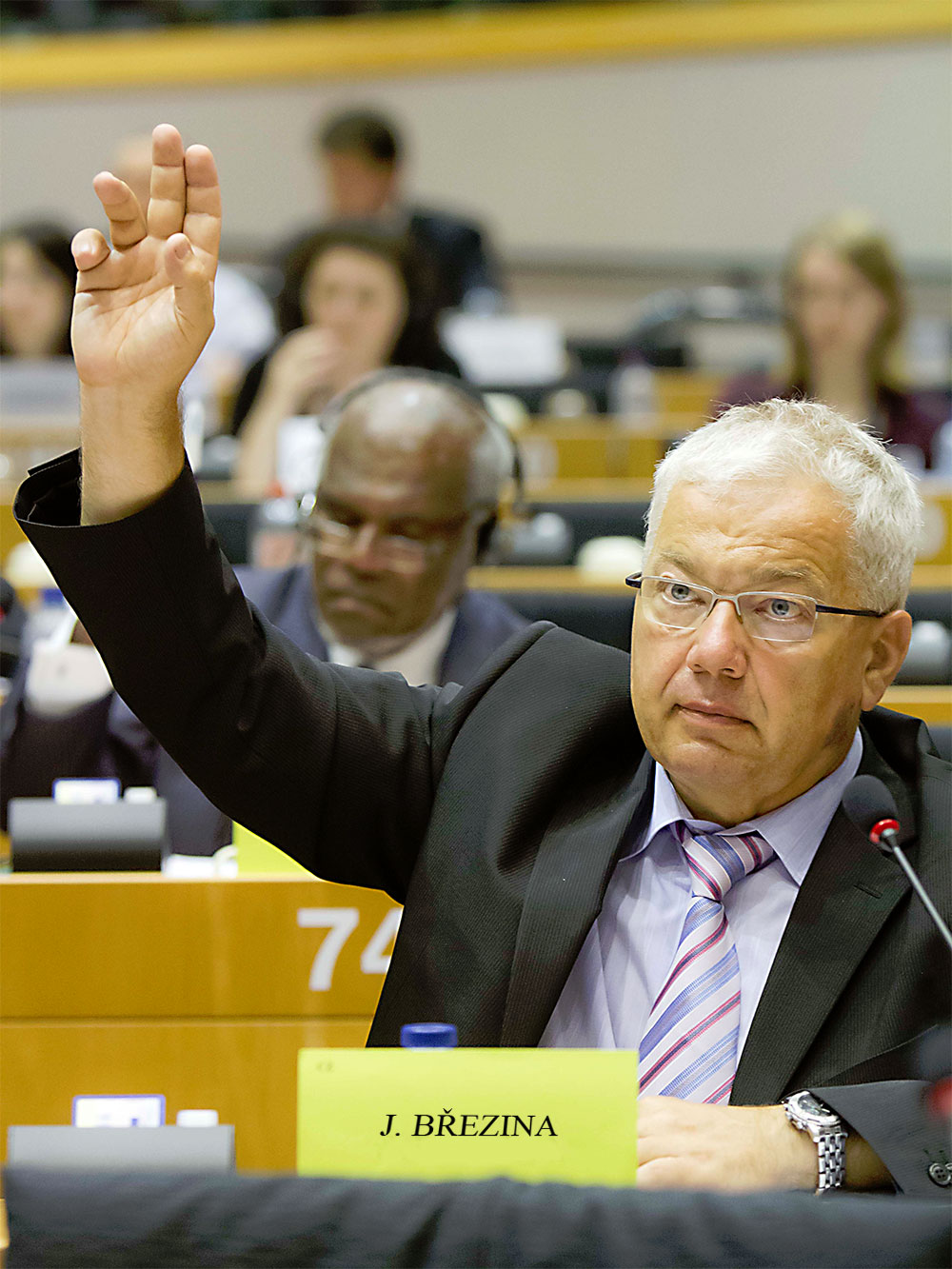
Candidate	Cyril Svoboda	Jan Březina
Electoral vote	157	127
Percentage	55.3%	44.7%
leader of KDU-ČSL before election
Jiří Čunek
Elected leader of KDU-ČSL
Cyril Svoboda

A leadership election for Christian and Democratic Union – Czechoslovak People's Party (KDU-ČSL) was held on 30 May 2009. Cyril Svoboda was elected leader of the party. Incumbent leader Jiří Čunek was eliminated in the first round. Other candidates were Jan Březina and Michael Šojdrová. Svoboda's victory was welcomed by Social democratic leader Jiří Paroubek because Svoboda represents left wing in the party.

== Results ==
Candidate	Cyril Svoboda	Jan Březina	Jiří Čunek	Michaela Šojdrová
1st round	91 (30.85%)	112 (37.97%)	61 (20.68%)	31 (10.51%)
2nd round	157 (55.28%)	127 (44.72%)	--	--
