= Chamber of Deputies Caucus of the Civic Democratic Party =

Parliamentary group in the Czech Republic

The Chamber of Deputies Caucus of the Civic Democratic Party is a parliamentary group in the Czech Republic. It currently has 25 members.

== Leadership ==
| Position | Name | Region |
|---|---|---|
| Chairman | Zbyněk Stanjura | Moravian-Silesian Region |
| 1st Deputy Chairwoman | Jana Černochová | Prague |
| Deputy Chairman | Jan Bauer | South Bohemian Region |
| Deputy Chairman | Ivan Adamec | Hradec Králové Region |
| Deputy Chairman | Marek Benda | Prague |

== History ==
The caucus was established in 1991 when ODS split from Civic Forum. 33 Deputies joined the Caucus.

=== 2013-2017 ===
The Caucus was reduced to 16 members following the 2013 legislative election. Zbyněk Stanjura became the Chairman. Jiří Pospíšil left the Caucus in 2014 leaving it with 15 members. Pospíšil was then elected a Member of European Parliament and gave up his seat in the Chamber of Deputies. He was replaced by Vladislav Vilímec and the caucus returned to 16 seats. Alfred Beznoska left the Chamber in March 2017 and was replaced by Jan Skopeček.

=== Since 2017 ===
The caucus consisted of 25 members following the 2017 election.
