= Senate district 77 – Vsetín =

Electoral district in the Czech Republic

77 – Vsetín
- inline Senate district of the Czech Republic

- The Vsetín district on a map
- Senator: Jiří Čunek; KDU-ČSL
- Region: Zlín
- District: Vsetín
- Last election: 2024
- Next election: 2030

Senate district 77 – Vsetín is an electoral district of the Senate of the Czech Republic, located in part of the Vsetín District. Since 2006, the Senator for the district has been Christian Democrat Jiří Čunek.

== Senators ==
Year	Senator	Party
1996	Vladimír Oplt	ODS
2000	Jaroslav Kubín	Independent
2006	Jiří Čunek	KDU-ČSL
2012	Jiří Čunek	KDU-ČSL
2018	Jiří Čunek	KDU-ČSL
2024	Jiří Čunek	KDU-ČSL

== Election results ==
=== 1996 ===
1996 Czech Senate election in Vsetín
Candidate	Party	1st round		2nd round	
Candidate	Party	Votes	%	Votes	%
Vladimír Oplt	ODS	13 923	39,92	17 090	52,02
Robert Dostál	ČSSD	8 450	24,23	15 765	47,98
Zdeněk Rolinc	KDU-ČSL	8 151	23,37	—	—
Milan Halbich	KSČM	3 339	9,57	—	—
Aglaia Škarpová	ČSNS	635	1,82	—	—
Jiří Kozák	MSLK 96	382	1,10	—	—

=== 2000 ===
2000 Czech Senate election in Vsetín
Candidate	Party	1st round		2nd round	
Candidate	Party	Votes	%	Votes	%
Jaroslav Kubín	Independent	11 774	37,44	14 644	71,17
Vladimír Oplt	ODS	7 713	24,52	5 931	28,82
Jiří Hruška	4KOALICE	5 798	18,43	—	—
Vlastislav Antolák	KSČM	3 677	11,69	—	—
Svatoslav Tyralík	ČSSD	2 482	7,89	—	—

=== 2006 ===
2006 Czech Senate election in Vsetín
Candidate	Party	1st round		2nd round	
Candidate	Party	Votes	%	Votes	%
Jiří Čunek	KDU-ČSL	19 606	44,01	14 319	71,34
Jiří Kubeša	ODS	10 825	24,30	5 752	28,65
Dagmar Lacinová	ČSSD	7 949	17,84	—	—
Jiří Varga	KSČM	3 379	7,58	—	—
Karel Pavelka	SZ	2 787	6,25	—	—

=== 2012 ===
2012 Czech Senate election in Vsetín
Candidate	Party	1st round		2nd round	
Candidate	Party	Votes	%	Votes	%
Jiří Čunek	KDU-ČSL	16 306	47,28	14 995	72,13
Jindřich Šnejdrla	ČSSD	5 738	16,63	5 793	27,86
Jiří Částečka	ODS	4 294	12,45	—	—
Vladimír Místecký	KSČM	4 244	12,30	—	—
Jindřich Cahlík	Independent	2 293	6,64	—	—
Aleš Bardoň	M	589	1,70	—	—
Karel Nedbálek	SBB	557	1,61	—	—
Marie Hořčicová	NÁR.SOC.	467	1,35	—	—

=== 2018 ===
2018 Czech Senate election in Vsetín
Candidate	Party	Votes	%
Jiří Čunek	KDU-ČSL	24 158	51,59
Miroslav Koňařík	Independent	7 933	16,94
Zbyněk Fojtíček	ODS	6 086	12,99
Petr Kořenek	ČSSD	4 140	8,84
Radek Vraj	SPD	3 163	6,75
Dáša Bazalková	KSČM	1 341	2,86

=== 2024 ===
2024 Czech Senate election in Vsetín
Candidate	Party	Votes	%
Jiří Čunek	KDU-ČSL	16 414	56,76
Yvona Wojaczková	ANO	9 579	33,12
Robert Hampl	SPD, Tricolour	2 923	10,10
