= Czech Aeroholding =

Czech Aeroholding, a.s., was a company whose sole shareholder was the state, represented by the Ministry of Finance of the CR, came into being with its entry in the Commercial Register on March 11, 2011, in keeping with a government decree of November 2010. The main task of Czech Aeroholding was to ensure coordination, financial management and implementation of synergies within the group.

== Czech Aeroholding Group ==
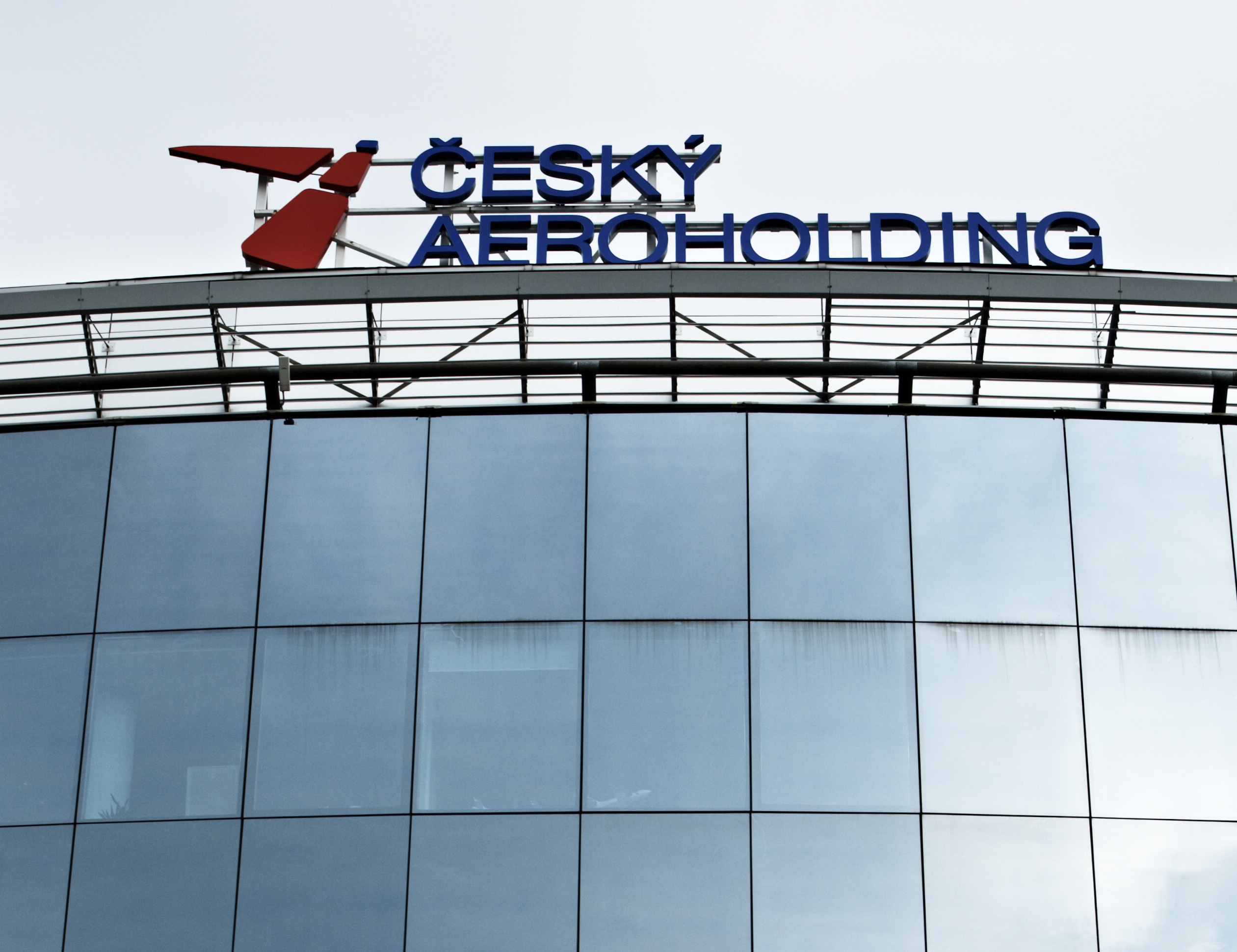
Sídlo společnosti Český Aeroholding, a.s.

Czech Aeroholding gradually assumed control of aviation transport companies and firms providing related ground services at the Václav Havel Airport Prague. From 2011, the following companies became part of Czech Aeroholding: Prague Airport – operator of the Václav Havel Airport Prague, Czech Airlines, an air transport company and other firms grouped under Czech Airlines. These include HOLIDAYS Czech Airlines, a charter transport company; Czech Airlines Technics, providing aircraft maintenance services; Czech Airlines Handling, providing aircraft handling and passenger check-in services; and CSA Services, which operates a call center and offers human resources services. Czech Aeroholding was a leading employer, creating approximately 5600 jobs.

=== Significant Events at Czech Aeroholding ===
- January 2011 - The government of the Czech Republic approves the establishing privatization project for a portion of the assets of the state company Sprava Letiště Praha.
- February 2011 - the Ministry of Finance of the Czech Republic signs the company charter.
- March 2011 - Czech Aeroholding, a.s., is entered in the Register of Companies.
- May 2011 - the CR government decides that after the company is divided through a spin-off, 100% of Prague Airport shares will be merged with a portion of its assets and deposited as a non-monetary investment in Czech Aeroholding.
- October 2011 - real property is transferred from Prague Airport and merged with the holdings of Czech Aeroholding. A shared services center was created in the new parent company.
- October 2011 - a decision by the Office for the Protection of Competition comes into force allowing the merger of competitors
- October 2011 - Czech Airlines Handling becomes part of the Czech Aeroholding Group.
- November 2011 - CSA Services becomes part of the Czech Aeroholding Group.
- December 2011 - HOLIDAYS Czech Airlines becomes part of the Czech Aeroholding Group.
- January 2012 - selected services are transferred from Czech Airlines to Czech Aeroholding.
- March 2012 - the Ministry of Finance of the CR signs a contract transferring 100% of the stock of Prague Airport to Czech Aeroholding.
- April 2012 - a ruling by the Prague Municipal Court comes into force increasing the registered capital of Czech Aeroholding by depositing Prague Airport stock in the amount of CZK 26,944,000,000.
- April 2012 - Czech Airlines Technics becomes a subsidiary company of Czech Aeroholding.
- June 2012 - The government of the Czech Republic approves the method of incorporating Czech Airlines, Inc. into the Czech Aeroholding Group.
- August 2012 - An agreement on the deposit of Czech Airlines, Inc. shares into Czech Aeroholding, Inc. is signed. Czech Aeroholding, Inc. thus becomes the majority shareholder of Czech Airlines, replacing the Ministry of Finance of the Czech Republic.
- November 2012 - Czech Government passes a resolution in which it authorizes the company Czech Aeroholding to prepare a tender for the sale of the share capital of Czech Airlines, or for finding a possible strategic investor.
- March 2013 - Czech Aeroholding receives a binding offer from Korean Air to purchase 460,725 shares in Czech Airlines, representing a 44% stake. Subsequently the Government of the CR approves the offer.
- April 2013 - Petr Nečas, Prime Minister of the CR, Miroslav Kalousek, Minister of Finance of the CR and representatives of Czech Aeroholding and Korean air sign a contract for the purchase of 460,725 Czech Airlines shares by Korean Air.
- October 2018 - Czech Aeroholding is removed from the business register.

=== Structure of the Holding Company ===
- Czech Aeroholding, a.s.
  - Letiště Praha
  - České aerolinie a.s.
  - Czech Airlines Handling, a.s.
  - Czech Airlines Technics, a.s.

== Czech Aeroholding, a.s. ==
=== Business ===
Aside from the Group management, Czech Aeroholding dealt with intangible asset rental (including infrastructure) at Václav Havel Airport Prague. The company owned the buildings and land which were formerly under the ownership of Prague Airport. Prague Airport, the operator of Václav Havel Airport Prague and other entities, leased them on the basis of long-term contracts. Czech Aeroholding also served as a shared services center for all firms within the holding company. It provided shared services such as IT, human resources management, central purchasing and sales, legal services, financial services and accounting to its subsidiaries.

=== Headquarters ===
Czech Aeroholding, a.s. was headquartered in the APC building at Prague Airport.

=== Bodies ===
Czech Aeroholding, a.s., was managed by a six-member Board of Directors. There was also a Supervisory Board consisting of twelve members.
