= 2003 Christian and Democratic Union – Czechoslovak People's Party leadership election =

Czech political party leadership election

- 8 November 2003
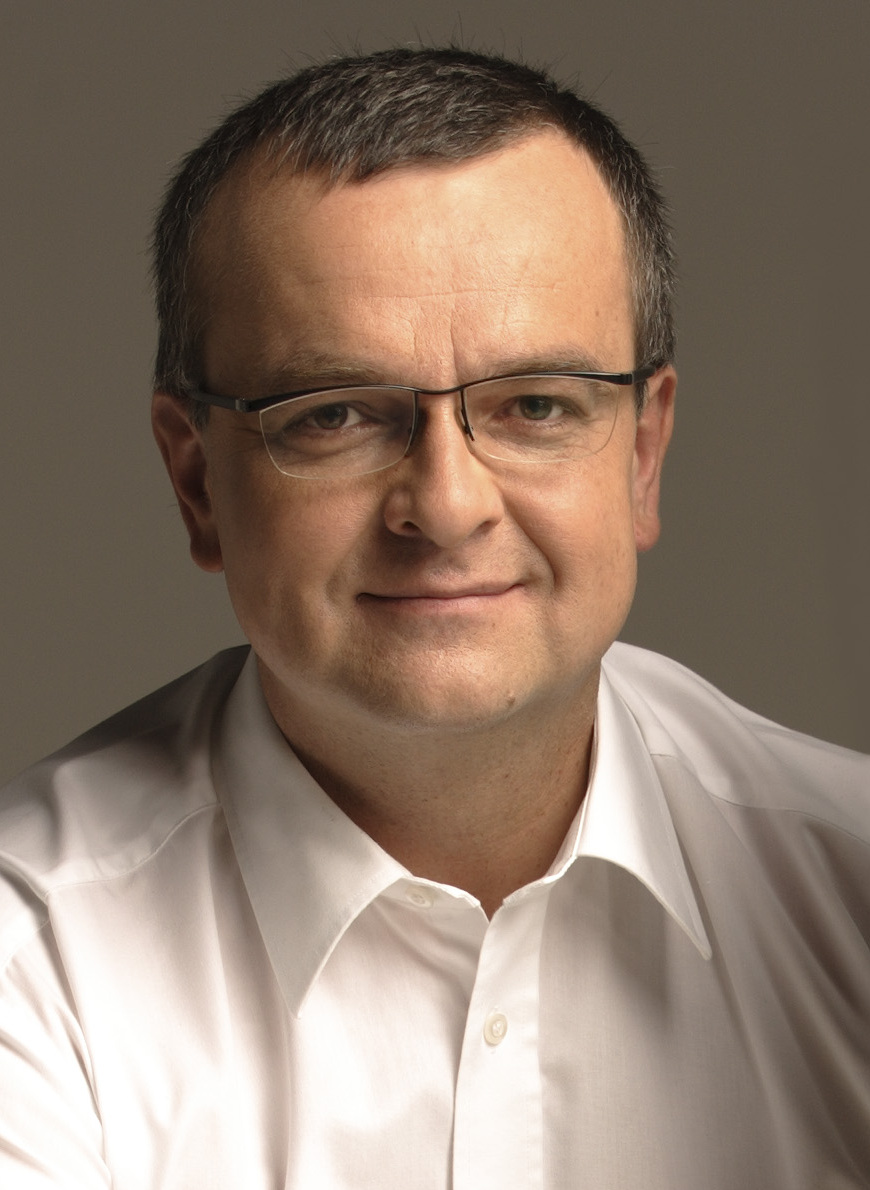

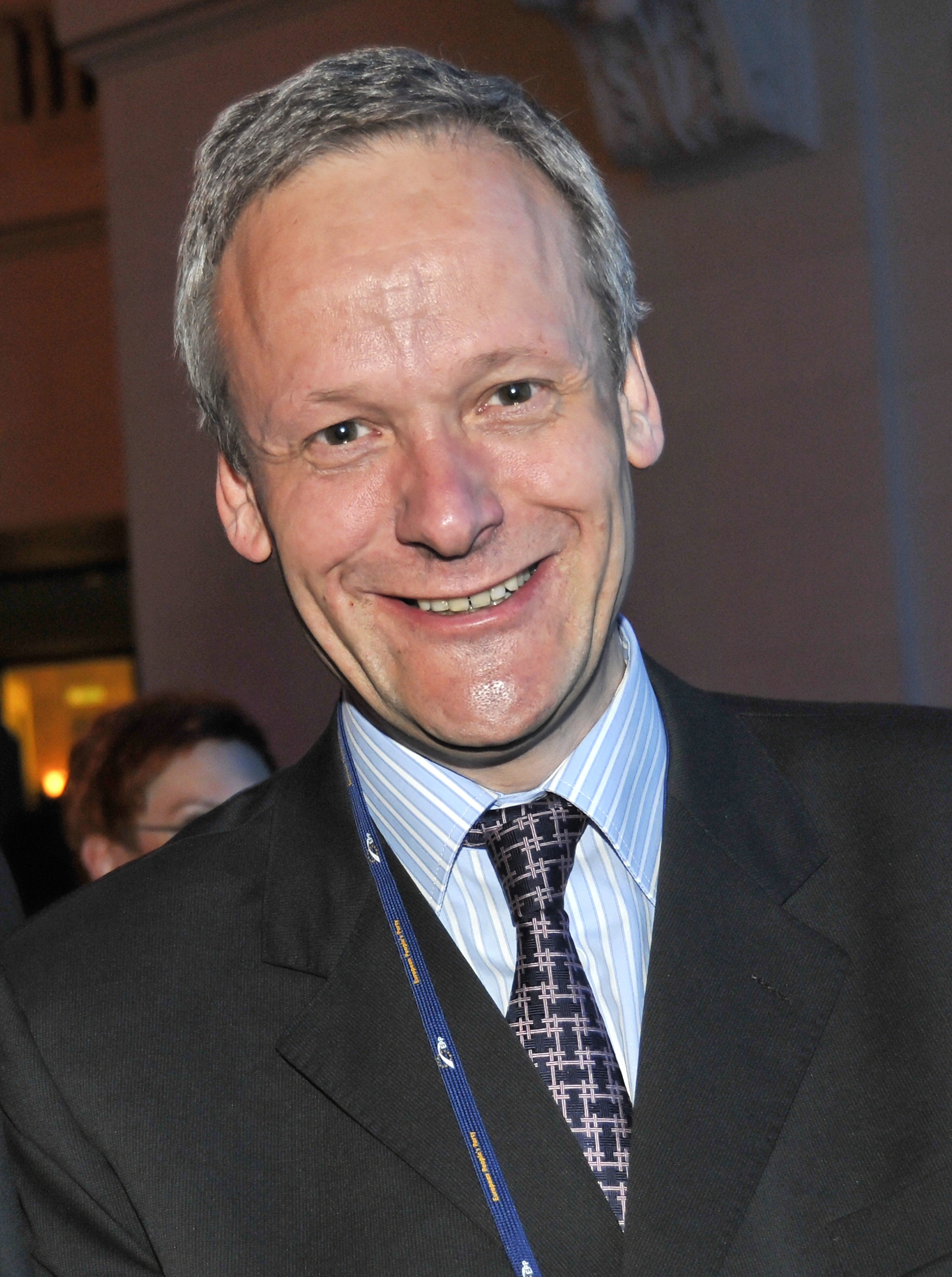
Candidate	Miroslav Kalousek	Cyril Svoboda
Electoral vote	164	135
Percentage	54.6%	43.6
leader of KDU-ČSL before election
Cyril Svoboda
Elected leader of KDU-ČSL
Miroslav Kalousek

A leadership election for Christian and Democratic Union – Czechoslovak People's Party (KDU-ČSL) was held on 8 November 2003. The incumbent leader Cyril Svoboda was unexpectedly defeated by Miroslav Kalousek.

== Candidates ==
- Cyril Svoboda - the incumbent leader of KDU-ČSL was endorsed by Czech Social Democratic Party leader Vladimír Špidla and was considered left-wing candidate. He was considered front-runner of the election.
- Miroslav Kalousek - Kalousek was considered more right-wing candidate than Svoboda. He was endorsed by Civic Democratic Party leader Mirek Topolánek.
- Jaromír Talíř - Considered the outsider of the election.
- Libor Ambrozek - Minister of environment. He had support in Moravian regions and offered himself as a centrist candidate.

== Result ==
Candidate	1st round	2nd round
Miroslav Kalousek	135 (45.1%)	164 (54.6%)
Cyril Svoboda	116 (38.7%)	135 (43.6%)
Jaromír Talíř	22 (7.3%)	-
Libor Ambrozek	20 (6.6%)	-
