= 2001 Christian and Democratic Union – Czechoslovak People's Party leadership election =

Czech political party leadership election

- 27 May 2001
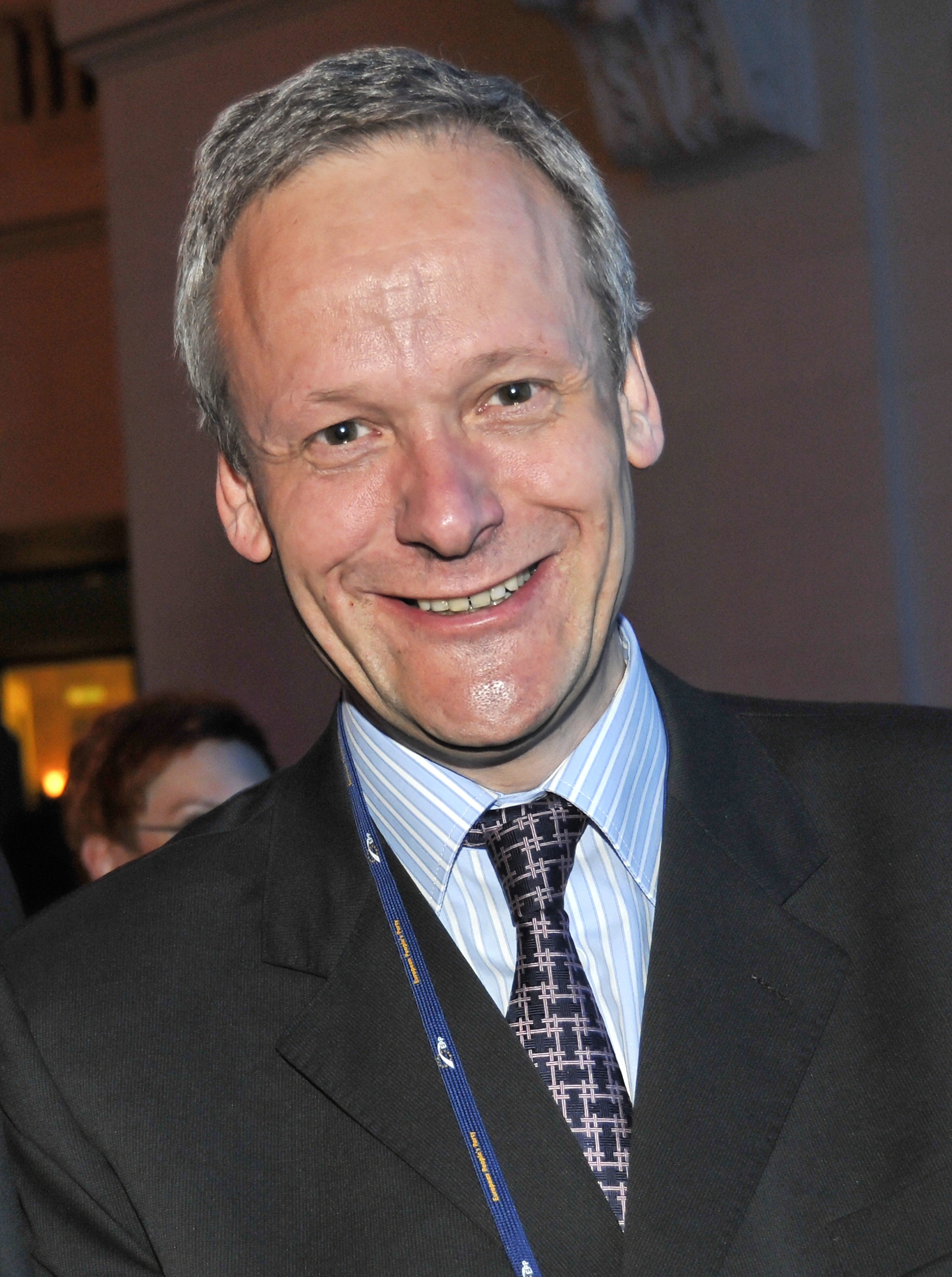

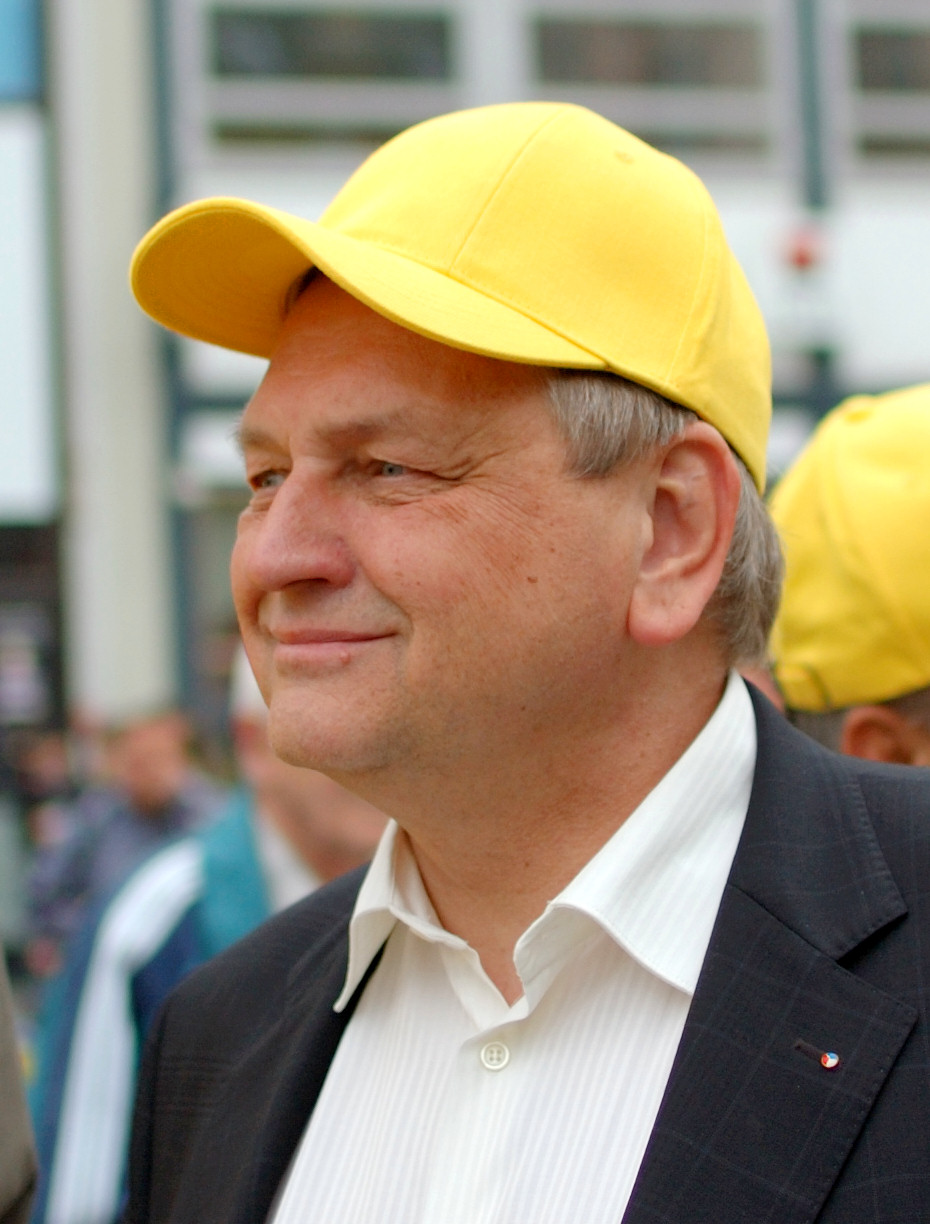
Candidate	Cyril Svoboda	Jan Kasal
Electoral vote	162	145
Percentage	52.8	47.20
leader of KDU-ČSL before election
Jan Kasal
Elected leader of KDU-ČSL
Cyril Svoboda

A leadership election for Christian and Democratic Union – Czechoslovak People's Party (KDU-ČSL) was held on 27 May 2001. The incumbent leader Jan Kasal was defeated by Cyril Svoboda.

== Voting ==
Candidate	1st round	2nd round
Cyril Svoboda		162 (52.77%)
Jan Kasal		145 (47.23%)

159 votes were required to win the election. No candidate received enough votes and second round was held. Svoboda received 162 votes and became the new leader.
