= 2015 TOP 09 leadership election =

Election for leadership of Czech political party

- 29 November 2015
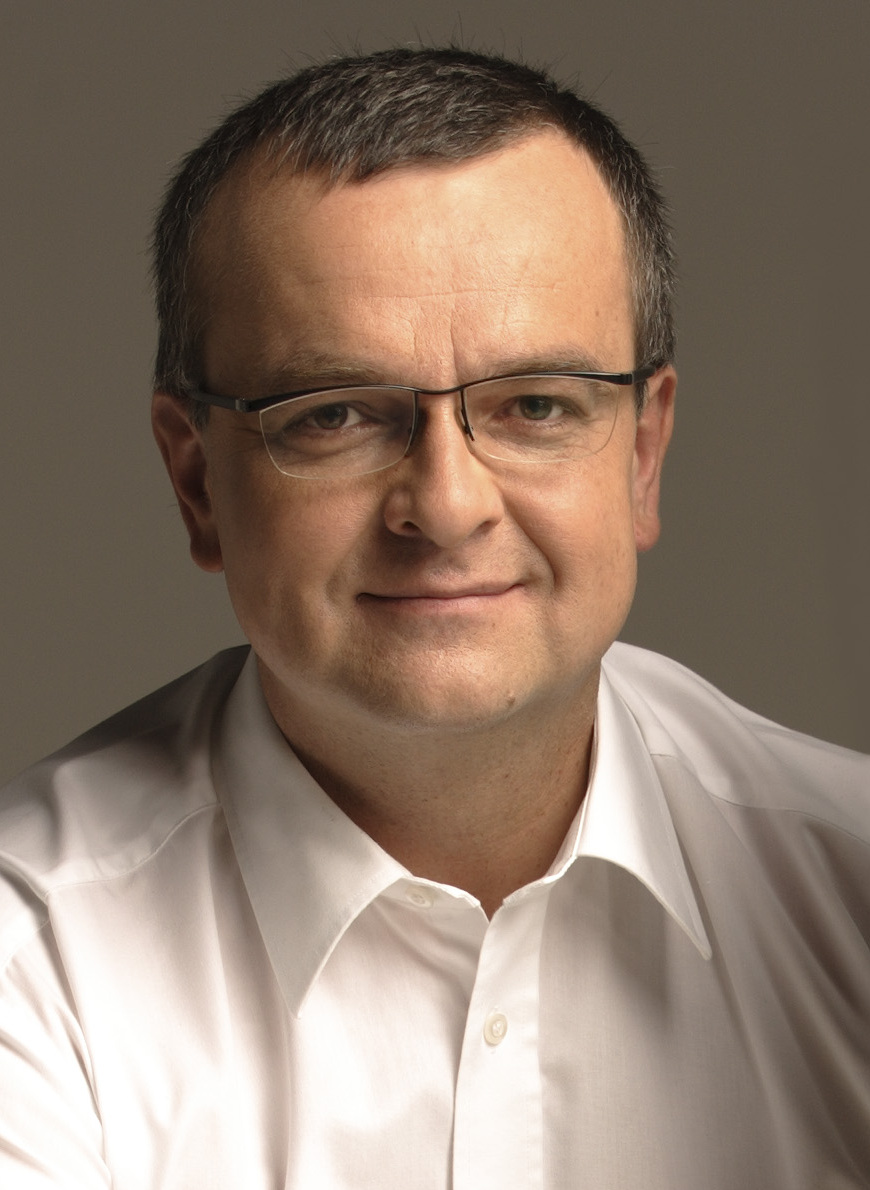
| Nominee | Miroslav Kalousek |
| Party | TOP 09 |
| Electoral vote | 148 |
| Percentage | 86.55% |
Leader of TOP 09 before election
Karel Schwarzenberg
Elected Leader of TOP 09
Miroslav Kalousek

A leadership election was held in the TOP 09 party in the Czech Republic on 29 November 2015. Miroslav Kalousek succeeded Schwarzenberg as party's leader.

The incumbent leader Karel Schwarzenberg announced on 5 October 2015 that he won't seek another term as a leader of TOP 09. He argued with his health. He stated that he became partially deaf. He suggested Miroslav Kalousek as his successor. Kalousek previously stated that he would run for the position if Schwarzenberg wouldn't. Kalousek announced his candidature on the same day.

The election was held on 29 November 2015. Kalousek received 148 votes of 171 and became the new leader. Kalousek was the only candidate.

== Results ==
| Candidate | Votes | % |
|---|---|---|
| Miroslav Kalousek | 148 | 86.55 |
| Against | 23 | 13.45 |
| Total | 171 | 100 |
