= Vyšehrad Proclamation =

2017 Czech government document

The Vyšehrad Proclamation was introduced by the Czech Civic Democratic Party (ODS) on 17 August 2017. It consisted of 12 conditions for the party to be part of a government coalition after the 2017 legislative election.

ODS leader Petr Fiala stated that the declaration didn't mean the party would be in opposition after the election, but that it was a condition for being part of the government. He also stated that the proclamation provided space for negotiation.

== Conditions ==
The following are the 12 conditions of the proclamation:

- 1) Increasing wages and lowering taxes
- 2) Significant reduction of social security contributions by employers
- 3) Raising the limit of flat-rate payments for traders at least twice
- 4) Commitment not to raise taxes for businesses throughout the election period
- 5) Introduction of a simple and uniform tax return as well as social and health insurance
- 6) Cancellation of electronic revenue records and introduction of a flat-rate tax for non-payers of VAT—the principle of "pay and start without further checks" for the smallest entrepreneurs.
- 7) Audit of bureaucratic burdens and the legal system in key areas within six months of the government's inception, and a radical reduction in the number of regulations, laws, and decrees in the first and second year of government.
- 8) Implementation of the "Everything in One Door" system to handle all common issues for citizens from 1 January 2019
- 9) Significant cuts in national subsidies to private firms and significant cuts in investment incentives
- 10) Education becomes the financial and political priority of the government
- 11) The government prepares a confident position in the EU and a strategy to promote EU reforms based on national interests and national consensus. The government's program will include the refusal of mandatory refugee quotas and the mandatory adoption of the euro.
- 12) No questioning of the Euro–Atlantic orientation of Czechia; increase its spending on security; gradual increase in defense spending to two percent of GDP over six years.

== Post-election ==
The ODS received 11% of votes and became the second strongest party in Czechia. Then-deputy party leader Alexandra Udženija promised that the ODS would not abandon the Vyšehrad Proclamation. Fiala stated that the ODS would not participate in the government led by ANO 2011. He also began negotiations with other opposition parties about possible cooperation.
