= Pilny =

Pilny or Pilný is a surname. Notable people with the surname include:

- Bohuslav Pilný (born 1973), Czech footballer and manager
- Ivan Pilný (born 1944), Czech politician
- Otto Pilny (1866–1936), Swiss painter
