= Janot =

Janot is a surname. Notable people with the name include:

- Denis Janot (1529–1544), French printer and bookseller
- Jérémie Janot (born 1977), French footballer
- Raymond Janot (1917–2000), French politician
- Rodrigo Janot (born 1956), former Prosecutor General of Brazil

== See also ==
- Janota
