= 2005 Christian and Democratic Union – Czechoslovak People's Party leadership election =

- 12 November 2005
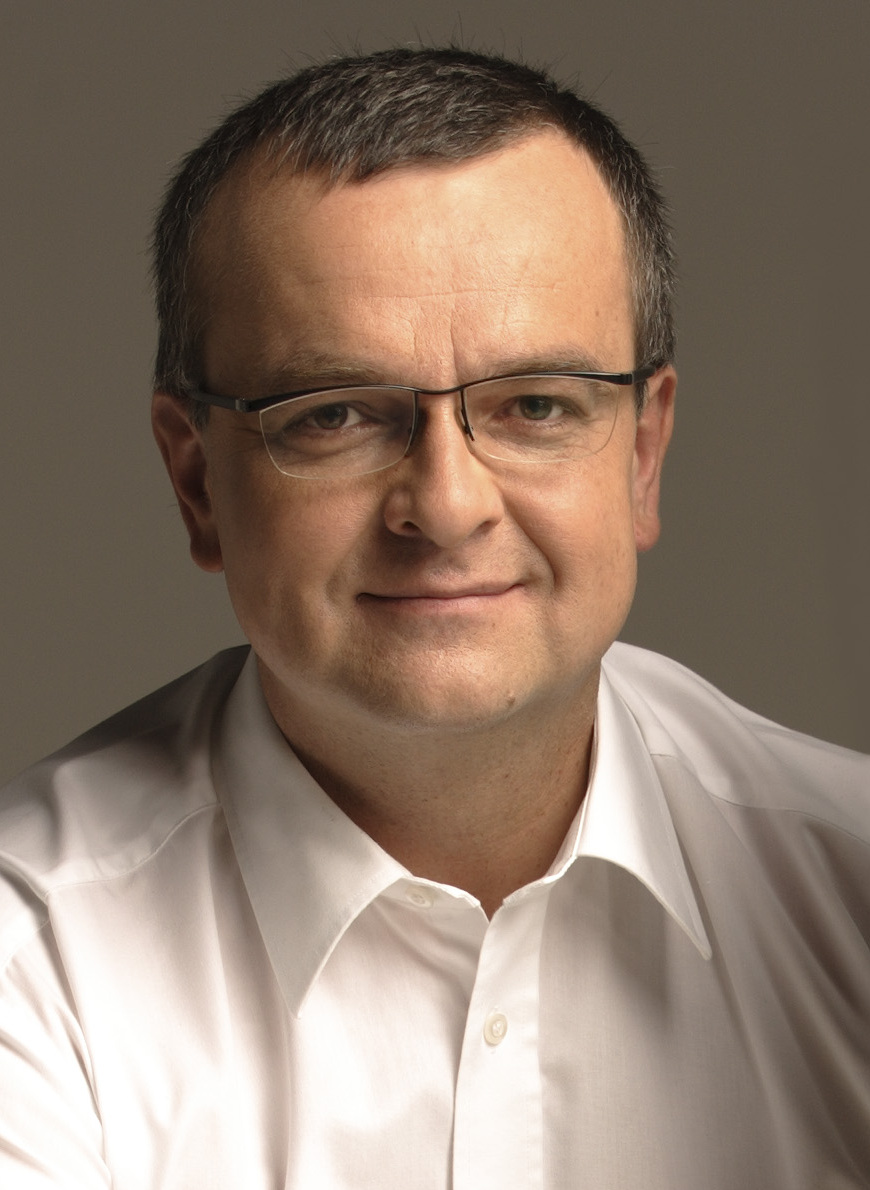
Candidate	Miroslav Kalousek
Electoral vote	249
Percentage	78.7%
leader of KDU-ČSL before election
Miroslav Kalousek
Elected leader of KDU-ČSL
Miroslav Kalousek

A leadership election for Christian and Democratic Union – Czechoslovak People's Party (KDU-ČSL) was held on 12 November 2005. The incumbent leader Miroslav Kalousek received almost 80% of votes and was reelected. Kalousek didn't have a rival.
