= 2006 Christian and Democratic Union – Czechoslovak People's Party leadership election =

Czech political party leadership election

- 9 December 2006
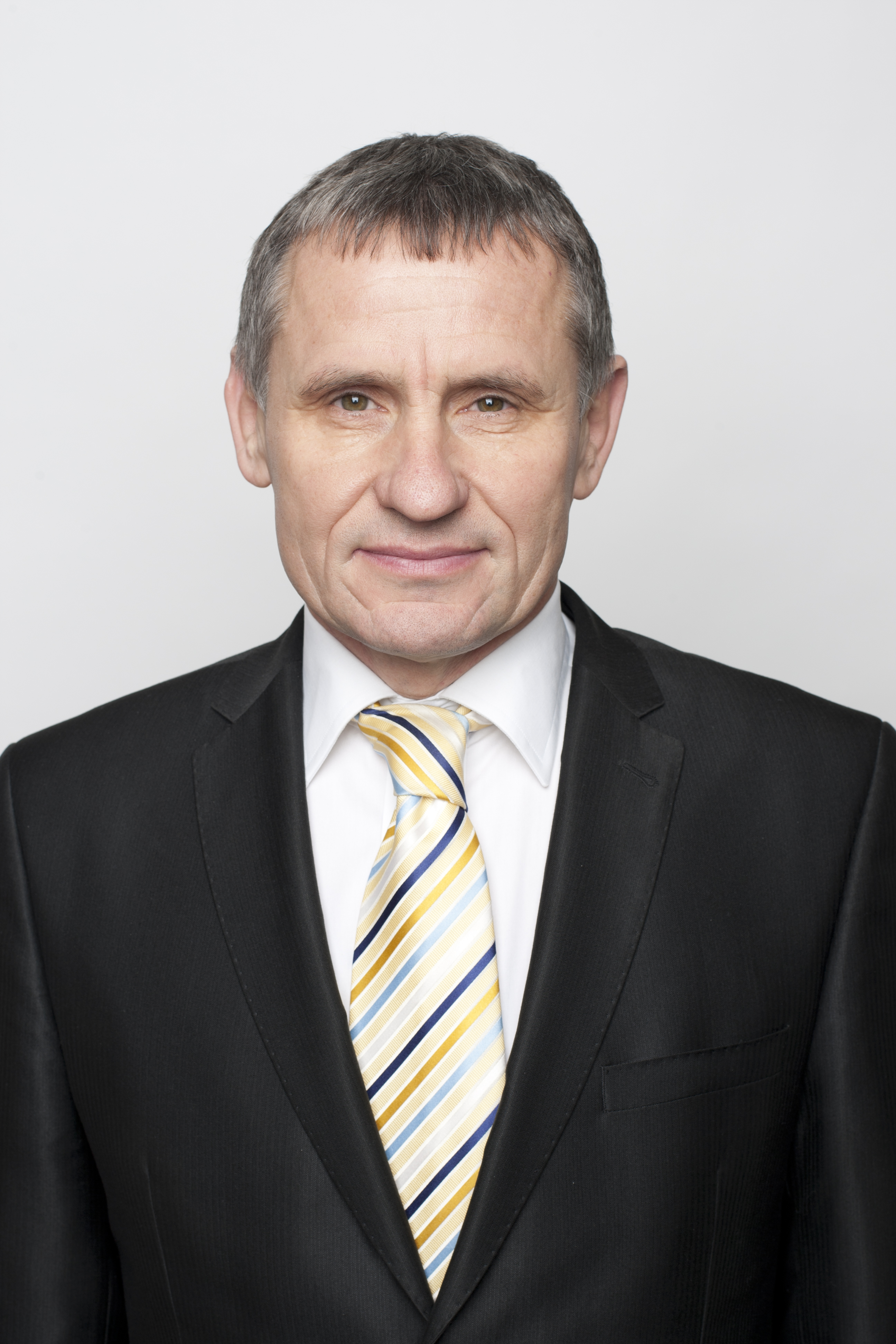

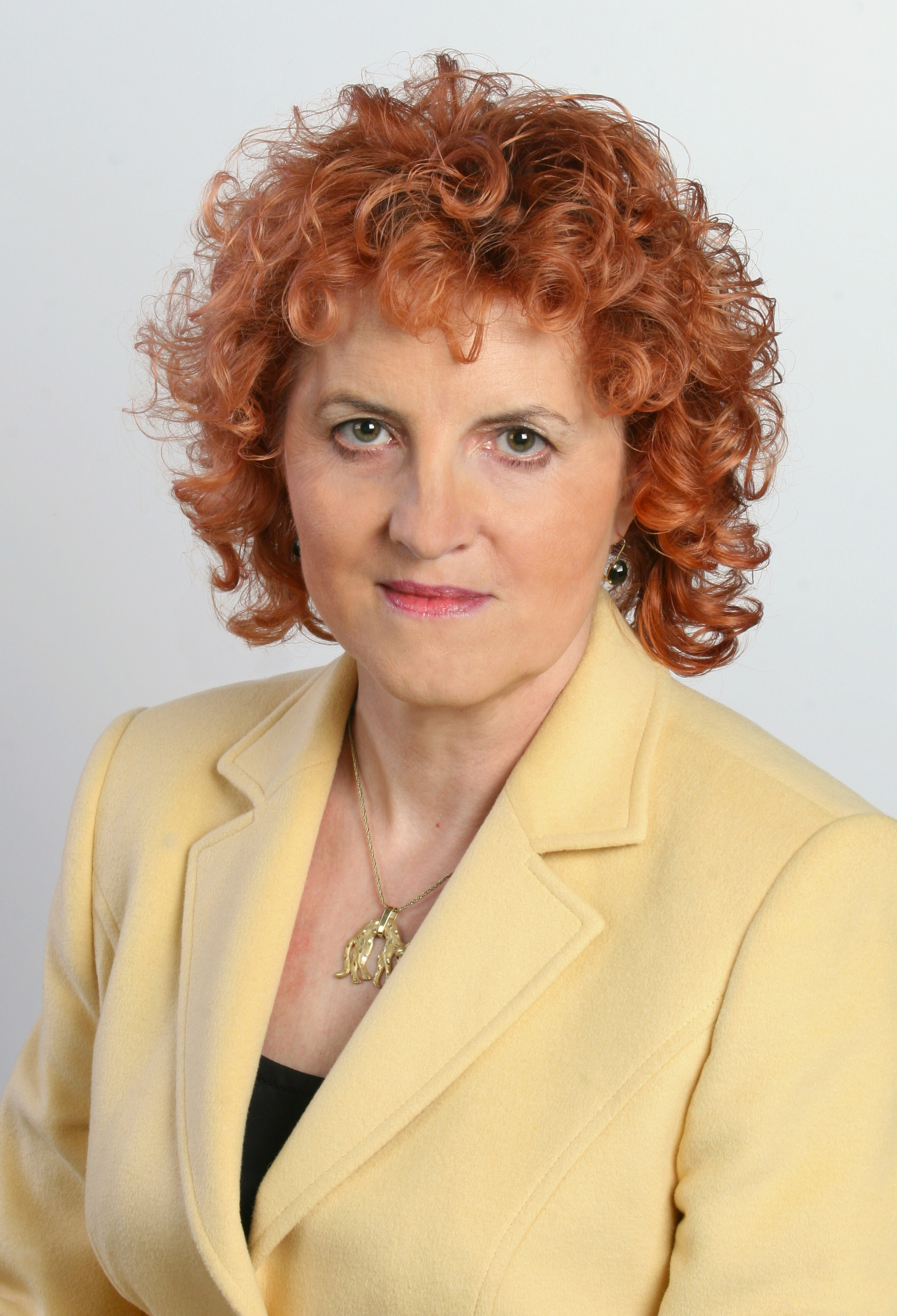

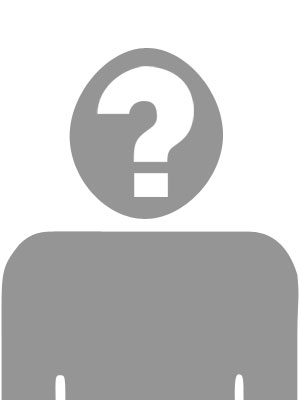

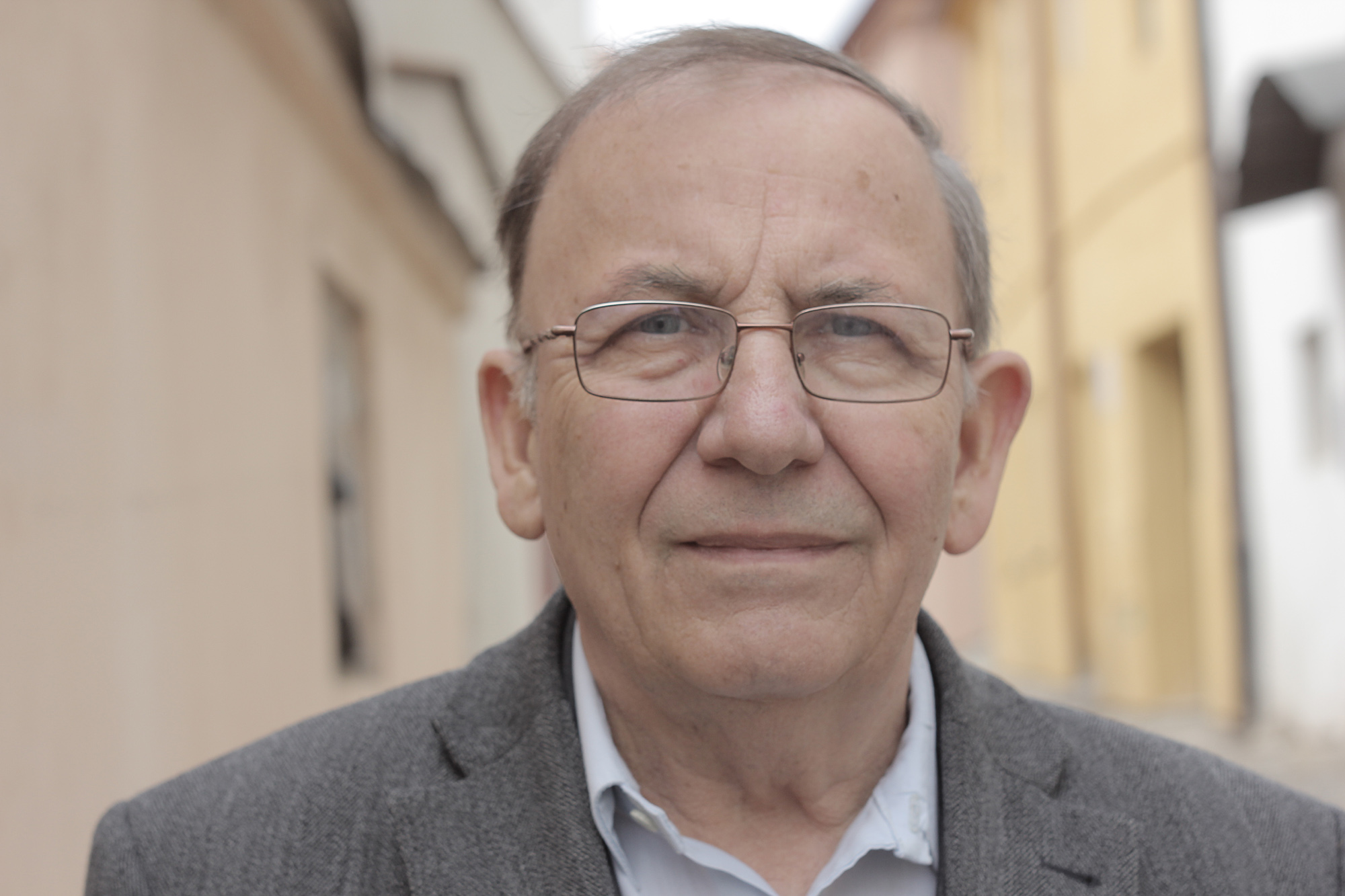
Candidate	Jiří Čunek	Vlasta Parkanová	Adolf Jílek
Electoral vote	182	82	25
Percentage	60.7%	27.3%	8.3%
Candidate	Jiří Karas
Electoral vote	11
Percentage	3.7%
leader of KDU-ČSL before election
Jan Kasal (acting)
Elected leader of KDU-ČSL
Jiří Čunek

A leadership election for Christian and Democratic Union – Czechoslovak People's Party (KDU-ČSL) was held on 27 May 2017. Mayor of Vsetín Jiří Čunek became leader of KDU-ČSL when he defeated Vlasta Parkanová. The incumbent leader was Miroslav Kalousek.

== Background ==
Miroslav Kalousek resigned as leader of the party in August 2006 after he started negotiations with Czech Social Democratic Party about coalition supported by Communist Party. Jan kasal then became acting leader. Kasal refused to run. Senator and Mayor of Vsetín Jiří Čunek announced candidature for the position of leader on 23 November 2006. Both candidates introduced their positions on 25 November in Brno. While Čunek's speech was met with applause, Jílek received only lukewarm reactions. Jiří Karas and Vlasta Parkanová announced their candidature on 27 November 2006.

== Candidates ==
- Jiří Čunek, Mayor of Vsetín and Member of Senate. He is known for his solution of problems with Romas in Vsetín which was controversial in the party but popular among voters. He stated that he wants to unify the party.
- Adolf Jílek, Senator. He stated that he wants to have a limited mandate. He was critical of Čunek's actions as Mayor of Vsetín.
- Jiří Karas, former MP. He is known as a strong opponent of Abortions.
- Vlasta Parkanová, Member of Parliament. She was the most popular politician at the time of election. Parkanová stated that she wants to open KDU-ČSL to all people who believe that keeping Christian values in Europe is important. She stated that lack of female candidates also led to her decision to run. She was a candidate close to Kalousek.
- Petr Pithart, Jan Kasal and Stanislav Juránek refused to run.

== Results ==
Candidate	Votes	%
Jiří Čunek	182	60.67
Vlasta Parkanová	82	27.33
Adolf Jílek	25	8.33
Jiří Karas	11	3.67
Total	300	100
