= Poličná =

- Municipality
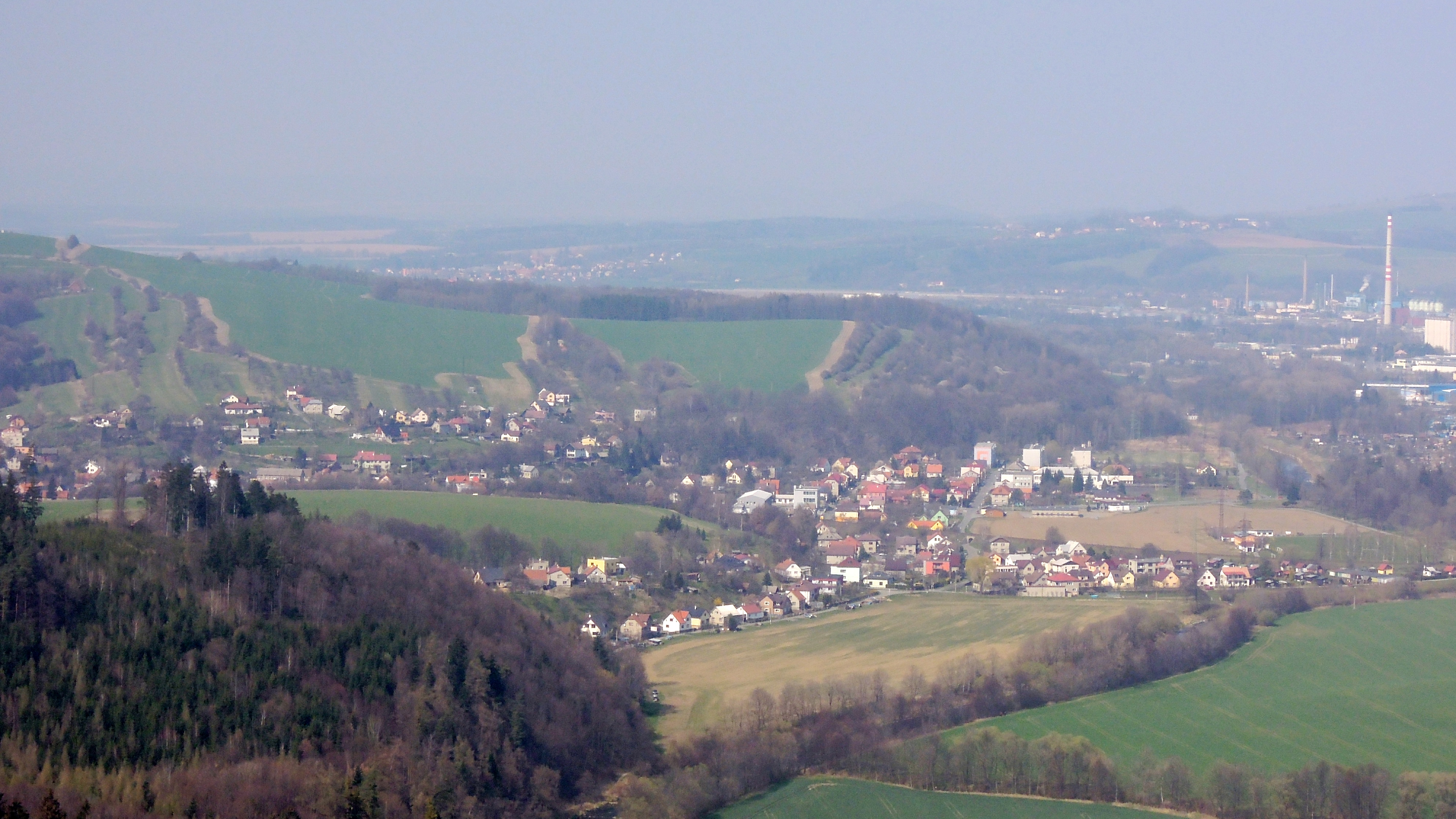
- General view of Poličná

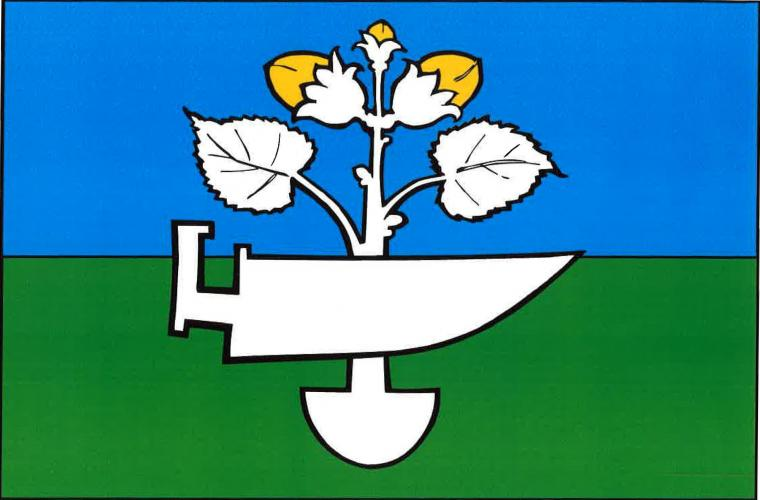
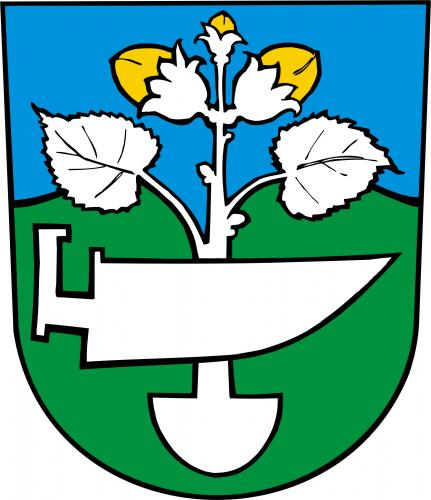
- Flag Coat of arms

- Location in the Czech Republic
- Coordinates: 49°27′48″N 17°56′13″E
- Country: Czech Republic
- Region: Zlín
- District: Vsetín
- First mentioned: 1310

Area
  - Total: 11.05 km^{2} (4.27 sq mi)
- Elevation: 293 m (961 ft)

Population (2026-01-01)
  - Total: 1,798
  - Density: 162.7/km^{2} (421.4/sq mi)
- Time zone: UTC+1 (CET)
  - Summer (DST): UTC+2 (CEST)
- Postal code: 757 01
- Website: www.policna.cz

Poličná (German: Politschen) is a municipality and village in Vsetín District in the Zlín Region of the Czech Republic. It has about 1,800 inhabitants.

== History ==
The first written mention of Poličná is from 1310. It was probably founded around 1270.

Poličná was joined to the town of Valašské Meziříčí in 1976, until a vote to separate the town was held on 21 April 2012, in which the majority voted in favor. On 1 January 2013, Poličná officially became independent again.

== Demographics ==
Historical population
Year	Pop.	±%
1869	1,067	—
1880	1,086	+1.8%
1890	1,112	+2.4%
1900	1,100	−1.1%
1910	1,188	+8.0%
1921	1,173	−1.3%
1930	1,350	+15.1%
1950	1,356	+0.4%
1961	1,445	+6.6%
1970	1,438	−0.5%
1980	1,526	+6.1%
1991	1,607	+5.3%
2001	1,651	+2.7%
2011	1,705	+3.3%
2021	1,716	+0.6%
Source: Censuses

== Notable people ==
- Jaroslav Kubín (1947–2025), politician
