= Janota =

Janota is a surname. In the Czech Republic and Poland, it comes from the personal name Jan ("John") and the suffix -ota. In Portuguese, it means "elegant".

Persons with this surname include:

- Eduard Janota (1952–2011), Czech economist
- Elisabeth von Janota-Bzowski (1912–2012), German artist
- Jolanta Janota (born 1964), Polish athlete
- Michał Janota (born 1990), Polish footballer
- Miroslav Janota (born 1948), Czech wrestler
- Oldřich Janota (1949–2024), Czech singer-songwriter
- Ricardo Janota (born 1987), Portuguese footballer
