= Jiří Čunek =

Czech politician (born 1959)

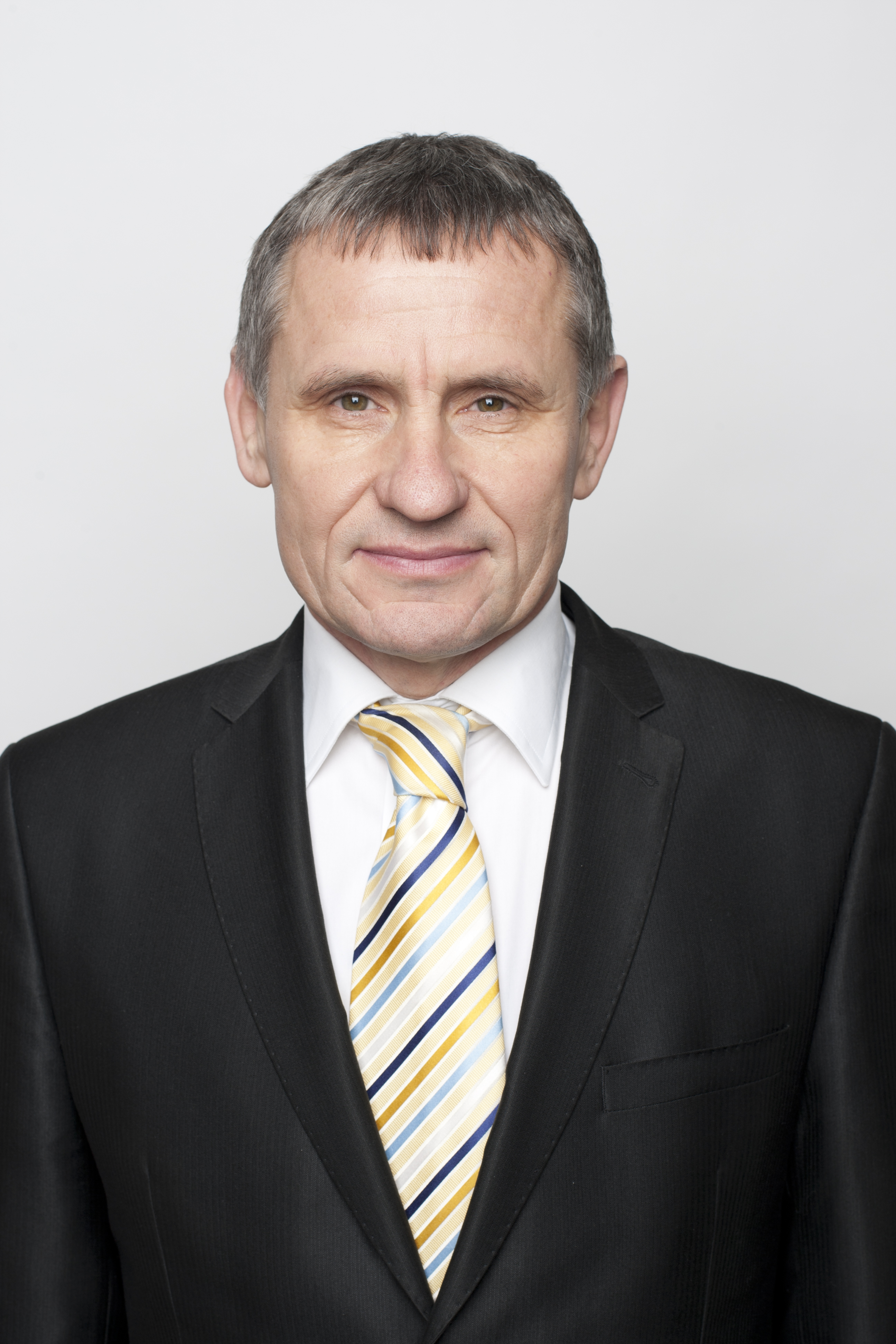
- Čunek in 2012

Minister for Regional Development
- In office 9 January 2007 – 13 November 2007
- Prime Minister: Mirek Topolánek
- Preceded by: Petr Gandalovič
- Succeeded by: Milan Půček (Acting)
- In office 2 April 2008 – 23 January 2009
- Prime Minister: Mirek Topolánek
- Preceded by: Jiří Vačkár (Acting)
- Succeeded by: Cyril Svoboda

First Deputy Prime Minister of Czech Republic
- In office 9 January 2007 – 13 November 2007
- Prime Minister: Mirek Topolánek
- Preceded by: Petr Nečas
- Succeeded by: Vlasta Parkanová (2009)

Senator from Vsetín
- Incumbent
- Assumed office 28 October 2006
- Preceded by: Jaroslav Kubín

Governor of Zlín Region
- In office 2 November 2016 – 10 November 2020
- Preceded by: Stanislav Mišák
- Succeeded by: Radim Holiš

Leader of KDU-ČSL
- In office 9 December 2006 – 30 May 2009
- Preceded by: Miroslav Kalousek
- Succeeded by: Cyril Svoboda

Personal details
- Born: 22 February 1959 (age 67) Gottwaldov, Czechoslovakia (now Zlín, Czech Republic)
- Party: KDU-ČSL
- Spouse: Pavla Čunková

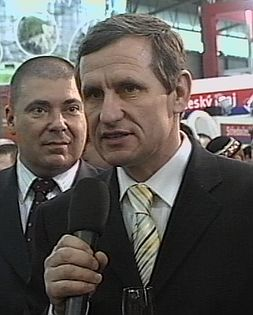
Jiří Čunek

Jiří Čunek (born 22 February 1959) is a Czech politician who was the leader of KDU-ČSL from December 2006 to May 2009. Čunek was also deputy prime minister and the minister for Regional Development in Mirek Topolánek's Second Cabinet until 23 January 2009. Since 2006, Čuněk has been senator from Vsetín. He also served as Governor of Zlín Region from 2016 to 2020.

Čunek was born in Gottwaldov (now Zlín), and after studying at a technical college, he worked as a car technician for a construction company in Zlín and as a safety technician in Zbrojovka Vsetín from 1982 to 1998. In 1990, Čunek became a member of KDU-ČSL. He was elected to the municipal council of Vsetín in 1994 and became mayor of the town in 1998. Since 2000, Čunek has been a member of the council of the Zlín Region. According to media reports, he was a very successful and popular mayor. In 2006 Čunek, was elected to the Senate of the Czech Republic by a large margin of 71.3%. He was re-elected in 2012 and 2018, when he obtained majority in the first round.

Čunek became famous across the country when the media published a report on how he dealt with the Romani slum in Vsetín. The Romani lived in the center of the city in a dilapidated building and as they did not pay the rent, Čunek forced them to move to the outskirts of Vsetín. Three families were moved into villages in the distant Jeseník District, where they bought houses, and the rest of families were moved into newly built flats near Vsetín. The media and several activists attempted to portray Čunek as a racist and supporter of the ghettoization of the Romani, and several leaders of the KDU-ČSL suggested Čunek to step down his positions.

Čunek used the newly acquired media publicity to announce his bid for the leader of KDU-ČSL party (the previous leader, Miroslav Kalousek, stepped down a few months earlier because of the outrage of party members over his proposal to form a minority coalition government with the Social Democrats with the parliamentary support of the hardline Communist Party of Bohemia and Moravia). Based predominantly on his tough approach to the Roma, Čunek obtained the position of KDU-ČSL leader on 9 December 2006 with a wide margin—182 votes out of 312.

Čunek has been named a suspect in corruption case, but not formally charged. Police suspected Čunek of having taken a bribe of half a million CZK from the H&B Real company for the sale of the majority share of the Vsetinské byty housing company in February 2002 when he was mayor of Vsetín. The investigation has been suspended after the prosecutor who originally launched was dismissed for bias (the procedure being employed for the first time since the law allowing it was passed). The matter gained extreme publicity and Čunek was subjected to a personal finance audit by an American firm Kroll; the audit largely cleared Čunek of this particular bribe suspicion. In late October 2007, Jiří Čunek was also accused by Czech Television of collecting government social assistance payments in 1998, while at the same time depositing close to 3.5 million Kc (approximately US$175,000) into various bank accounts. Consequently, he resigned from government.

He was reappointed as the Deputy Prime Minister and the Minister for Regional Development on 2 April 2008.

In October 2024 he ran for the leadership of the KDU-ČSL, finishing third.

Party political offices
| Preceded by Miroslav Kalousek | Chairman of Czechoslovak People's Party; 2006–2009 | Succeeded by Cyril Svoboda |
Government offices
| Preceded by Petr Gandalovič | Deputy Prime Minister and Minister for Regional Development of the Czech Republic; 2007; 2008–2009 | Succeeded by Cyril Svoboda |
