= Eduard Janota =

Czech Republic economist and politician

9th Finance Minister of the Czech Republic
- In office 8 May 2009 – 13 July 2010
- Prime Minister: Jan Fischer
- Preceded by: Miroslav Kalousek
- Succeeded by: Miroslav Kalousek

Personal details
- Born: 13 March 1952 Opava, Czechoslovakia
- Died: 20 May 2011 (aged 59) Radovesice, Czech Republic
- Education: University of Economics, Prague
- Profession: Economist

Eduard Janota (13 March 1952 – 20 May 2011) was a Czech economist and politician who served as the Minister of Finance from 2009 to 2010 in the caretaker government of Jan Fischer.

He died aged 59 on 20 May 2011, while playing tennis.
