= Vladimír Oplt =

Czech senator (1937–2021)

Senator from Vsetín
- In office 23 November 1996 – 23 November 2000
- Succeeded by: Jaroslav Kubín

Personal details
- Born: 5 July 1937 Kladno, Czechoslovakia
- Died: 5 January 2021 (aged 83) Valašské Meziříčí, Czech Republic
- Party: Communist Party of Czechoslovakia (1961–1968); Civic Democratic Party
- Education: Mendel University Brno

Vladimír Oplt (5 July 1937 – 5 January 2021) was a Czech politician who served as a Senator.
