= Alena Schillerová =

Czech politician and lawyer

Alena Schillerová MP
- Schillerová in 2026

Deputy Prime Minister of the Czech Republic
- Incumbent
- Assumed office 15 December 2025
- Prime Minister: Andrej Babiš
- In office 30 April 2019 – 17 December 2021
- Prime Minister: Andrej Babiš

Minister of Finance
- Incumbent
- Assumed office 15 December 2025
- Prime Minister: Andrej Babiš
- Preceded by: Zbyněk Stanjura
- In office 13 December 2017 – 17 December 2021
- Prime Minister: Andrej Babiŝ
- Preceded by: Ivan Pilný
- Succeeded by: Zbyněk Stanjura

Member of the Chamber of Deputies
- Incumbent
- Assumed office 9 October 2021

Personal details
- Born: Alena Dupalová; 18 March 1964 (age 62) Brno, Czechoslovakia (now Czech Republic)
- Party: Independent (nominated by ANO 2011) (2017–2021); ANO 2011 (2021–present)
- Spouse: Jaroslav Schiller
- Children: 2
- Education: Masaryk University

Alena Schillerová (née Dupalová; born 18 March 1964) is a Czech politician and lawyer who has served as Minister of Finance in the government of Prime Minister Andrej Babiš since 2025. She previously held the same role from 2017 to 2021. Schillerová is the first woman in the history of the Czech Republic to hold the office.

== Education and early career ==
A graduate of Masaryk University, Schillerová was awarded a JUDr. degree in law in 1988, and received a PhD. in administrative and agricultural cooperative law in 2000.

From 1991 to 2012 Schillerová was employed by the Tax Office of Brno-Country District, becoming deputy director in 1995 and Director in 2006. From the beginning on 2013 she worked for 18 months as deputy director of the Tax Office for the South Moravian Region, as well as heading the Methodology and Tax Performance Department. She then became the Director of the Legal and Tax Process Department of the General Financial Directorate.

== Entry into politics ==
On 1 January 2016, Schillerová was appointed expert deputy minister of finance, replacing Simona Hornochová. Among her priorities as deputy minister was the preparation of a new law on income tax.

In May 2017, Andrej Babiš requested that Schillerová should replace him as Minister of Finance. At the time, Prime Minister Bohuslav Sobotka rejected her nomination, saying she was too close to Babiš. Instead, Ivan Pilný was nominated.

== Minister of Finance ==
On 13 December 2017, following that year's national elections, Schillerová was appointed Minister of Finance in the cabinet of incoming Prime Minister Andrej Babiš, as an independent. At the end of June 2018, Babiš proposed Schillerová again for the post of Minister of Finance in his second cabinet. She was appointed by Zeman again on 27 June 2018, and became Deputy Prime Minister on 30 April 2019.

During her tenure, the government introduced a 7% digital tax in 2019 aimed at boosting state revenue by taxing advertising on global internet firms like Google and Facebook, based on earlier ideas for pan-European legislation.

During the COVID-19 pandemic, Schillerová was one of the key figures determining the government's economic strategy, as well as designing the support programme for the self-employed. According to Neovlivní, she lived with an income of CZK 173,000 per month in a 100m2 luxury apartment on Salvátorská Street in Prague 1, while the state paid for her living expenses.

=== Ex-officio roles ===
- Multilateral Investment Guarantee Agency (MIGA), World Bank Group, ex-officio member of the Board of Governors (2017–2021)
- World Bank, ex-officio member of the Board of Governors (2017–2021)
- European Investment Bank (EIB), ex-officio member of the Board of Governors (2017–2021)
- European Bank for Reconstruction and Development (EBRD), ex-officio member of the Board of Governors (2017–2021)

== In opposition ==
In the 2021 Czech parliamentary election, Schillerová led the ANO candidate list in the South Moravian Region, and was elected with 22,968 preference votes. She became the new chair of the ANO parliamentary group on 12 October, replacing Jaroslav Faltýnek. Schillerová joined ANO on 19 October 2021, becoming the party's vice-president at the party conference in February 2022.

In the 2022 Czech municipal elections, Schillerová ran for Brno City Council from 30th place on the ANO candidate list, and for the Brno-Komín Municipal Council from the last 17th place, but was not elected.

In February 2023, Babiš named Schillerová and Karel Havlíček as the new main faces of the ANO movement. At the party assembly in February 2024, she defended her position as vice president.

== Personal life ==
Schillerová is married to Jaroslav Schiller; they have two children named Petra and Jaroslav. Her daughter, Petra Rusňaková, is married to David Rusňák, an ANO official in Brno, who was investigated over the misuse of police information. Schillerová has three grandchildren.

== Controversy ==
The Czech government's official website states that Schillerová speaks English, German and Russian. However, her proficiency in English came under scrutiny in 2020 after a series of reports by Czech news outlets questioning it. Further concerns were raised by the minister's refusal to conduct interviews in English and her reported lack of participation in EU meetings conducted in the language.

At the end of January 2022, Seznam Zprávy reported that the Ministry of Finance had spent almost 2 million CZK on salaries and bonuses for a photographer and a cameraman, employees of the press department, who took Schillerová's photos and filmed content for her social media profiles. Lawyer and former civil servant Ondřej Závodský said Schillerová should repay the money, as it could be considered as the use of public assets for personal gain.
