= Finance Minister of the Czech Republic =

Cabinet position in Czechia

Minister of Finance of the Czech Republic Ministr financí České republiky

- Incumbent; Alena Schillerová since 15 December 2025
- Ministry of Finance of the Czech Republic
- Member of: Cabinet
- Appointer: Prime Minister
- Formation: 1969
- Website: www.mfcr.cz

The Finance Minister of the Czech Republic is the head of the Ministry of Finance of the Czech Republic which is concerned with financial and monetary matters.

The Finance Minister is a member of Prime Minister's Cabinet and is allowed to attend meetings of the National Security Council of the Czech Republic.

The current Finance Minister of the Czech Republic is Alena Schillerová, in office since 15 December 2025, who has also served in the role previously from 13 December 2017 to 17 December 2021.

== List of Finance Ministers of the Czech Republic ==
Name	Portrait	Entered office	Left office	Political party
Ivan Kočárník		1 January 1993	2 June 1997	ODS
Ivan Pilip		3 June 1997	22 July 1998	ODS
Ivo Svoboda		22 July 1998	22 July 1999	ČSSD
Pavel Mertlík		21 July 1999	12 April 2001	ČSSD
Jiří Rusnok		13 April 2001	15 July 2002	ČSSD
Bohuslav Sobotka		15 July 2002	4 September 2006	ČSSD
Vlastimil Tlustý		4 September 2006	9 January 2007	ODS
Miroslav Kalousek		4 September 2007	8 May 2009	KDU-ČSL
Eduard Janota		8 May 2009	13 July 2010	Independent
Miroslav Kalousek		13 July 2010	10 July 2013	TOP 09
Jan Fischer		10 July 2013	29 January 2014	Independent
Andrej Babiš		29 January 2014	24 May 2017	ANO 2011
Ivan Pilný		24 May 2017	13 December 2017	ANO 2011
Alena Schillerová		13 December 2017	17 December 2021	ANO 2011
Zbyněk Stanjura		17 December 2021	15 December 2025	ODS
Alena Schillerová		15 December 2025	Incumbent	ANO 2011
