= Jana Černochová =

Czech politician

Jana Černochová MP
- Černochová in 2026

Minister of Defence
- In office 17 December 2021 – 15 December 2025
- Prime Minister: Petr Fiala
- Preceded by: Lubomír Metnar
- Succeeded by: Jaromír Zůna

Member of the Chamber of Deputies
- Incumbent
- Assumed office 29 May 2010

Mayor of Prague 2
- In office 26 March 2012 – 20 December 2021
- Preceded by: Jiří Paluska
- Succeeded by: Alexandra Udženija

Personal details
- Born: 26 October 1973 (age 53) Prague, Czechoslovakia (now Czech Republic)
- Party: ODS (1997–present)
- Education: Metropolitan University Prague
- Website: www.janacernochova.cz

Jana Černochová (born 26 October 1973) is a Czech politician who served as Minister of Defence in the Cabinet of Petr Fiala from December 2021 to December 2025. She has been a member of the Czech parliament since 2010, representing the Civic Democratic Party (ODS).

== Early life and education ==
Černochová graduated from high school in 1992 and began working in a bank. She later studied international relations at the Metropolitan University Prague.

== Early political career ==
After joining ODS in 1997, Černochová became active in municipal politics and served as Mayor of Prague 2 from 2006 until 2010.

She was elected to the Chamber of Deputies in the 2010 general election, and again in 2013. In the latter election, she was elected from the third position on the ODS candidate list for Prague; she became first vice-president of the ODS parliamentary group in November 2013.

In the 2014 Czech municipal elections, Černochová defended her seat in the Prague 2 municipal assembly and was elected mayor for a second time.

Černochová contested the parliamentary election in 2017 as the lead candidate for ODS in Prague, and defended her seat receiving 12,426 preferential votes. She also defended her post as first vice-president. Following the 2017 elections, she became the chair of the Chamber of Deputies' defence committee.

In the October 2018 municipal elections, Černochová again led the ODS candidate list in Prague 2, and was re-elected as mayor of the district for the fourth time in November.

In September 2020, Černochová received a warning from the Security Information Service as being among a list of Czechs being monitored by the Chinese firm Zhenhua Data Technology, which is closely connected to the Chinese People's Army and the Chinese secret services. She responded: "It is evident that China's intelligence activities in the world are very active, and the Chinese regime does not only use standard intelligence services, but Chinese companies as well."

In the 2021 parliamentary election, Černochová ran for ODS as the second list member in Prague for the Spolu coalition. She received over 35,500 preferential votes and was re-elected as a Deputy.

== Minister of Defence ==
When Petr Fiala took office as Prime Minister of the Czech Republic, Černochová became the Minister of Defence in his cabinet.

Černochová was sworn in to this position in December 2021 by President Miloš Zeman, at Lány Castle. She was later succeeded as mayor of Prague 2 by Alexandra Udženija.

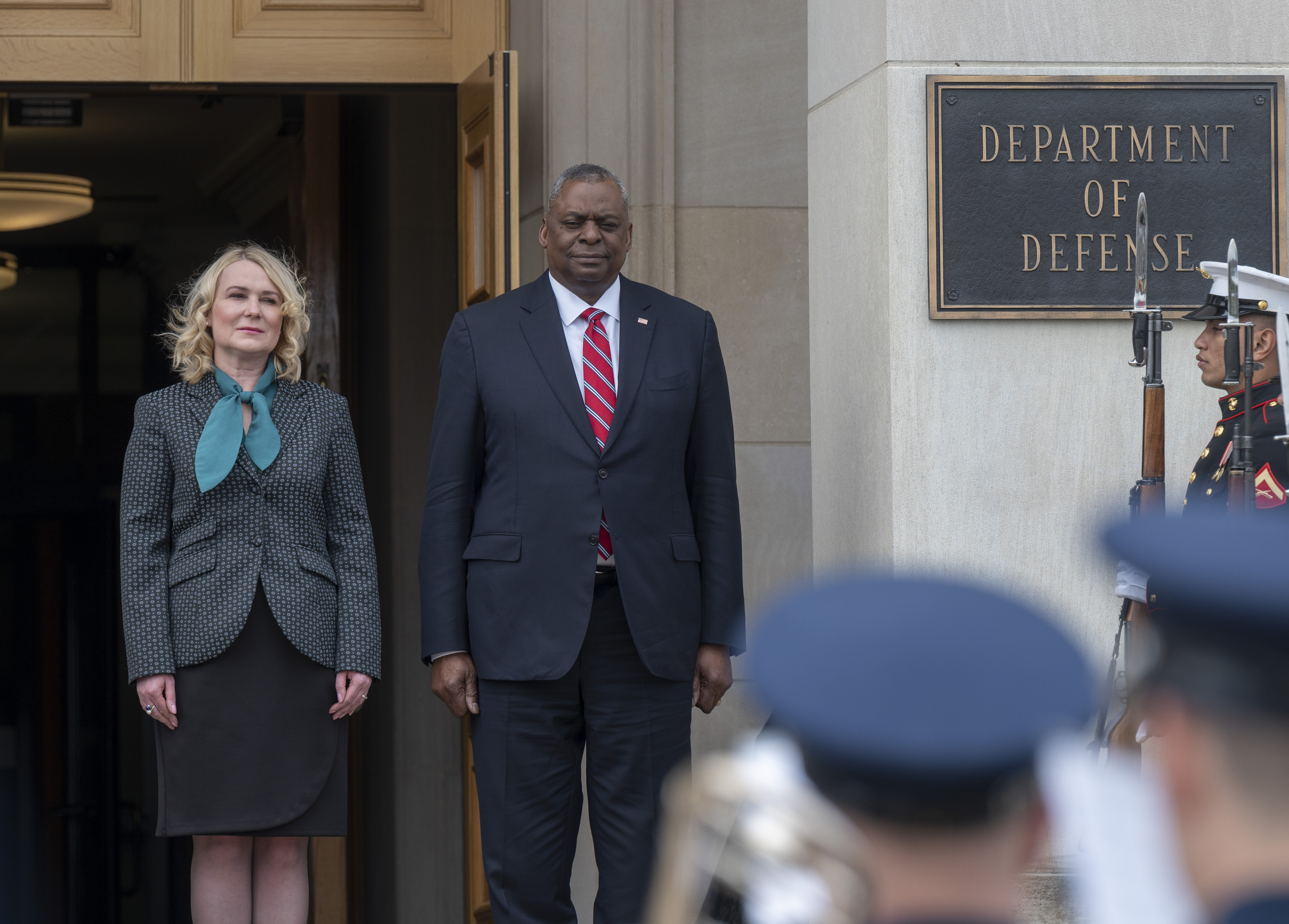
Černochová with U.S. Secretary of Defense Lloyd Austin in April 2022

As Minister of Defence, Černochová laid out plans to increase the military budget from 85 billion Czech koruna (CZK) in 2021, to 140 billion by 2025, in order for the Czech Republic to meet its commitment to NATO.

During a meeting with Turkish Defence Minister Hulusi Akar, Černochová praised Turkey's role in NATO and the military assistance to Ukraine, such as the delivery of Bayraktar TB2.

In 2023, when Chief of the General Staff Karel Řehka wished to resign his leadership of the army due to disagreements with Černochová, the situation was subsequently resolved after a meeting between Černochová, Řehka, and PM Fiala. Černochová later stated in an interview with Radiožurnal that she had suspected corruption in the army, and therefore temporarily took over the personnel agenda.

=== Russian invasion of Ukraine ===
After the Russian invasion of Ukraine, Černochová supported the supply of Czech weapons to the Armed Forces of Ukraine. She condemned the Russian annexation of eastern Ukrainian territories on 30 September 2022, stating: "We see clearly what the Russian wants, they steal and cannot do anything else. A rigged vote at gunpoint is no referendum. Annexation is blatant theft and we must not tolerate it." In May 2023, Černochová expressed hope that the 2023 Ukrainian counteroffensive would be successful and Czech weapons would help the Ukrainian army in liberating the occupied territory.

On 1 September 2023, Černochová speculated to the deputies of the defence committee over the possibility of World War III, the movement of a large number of allied troops through Czech territory, and the risk of nuclear warfare. She also criticised Ukrainian President Volodymyr Zelenskyy for his remarks at the United Nations General Assembly on 20 September 2023, in which he accused Poland of a lack of solidarity with Ukraine.

=== Israel ===
In May 2020, before becoming a minister, Černochová compared Culture Minister Lubomír Zaorálek to a Nazi after he condemned the expansion of Israeli settlements in the West Bank and compared the situation of the Palestinian people to Czechoslovakia during the 20th century. She expressed support for Israel during the 2021 Israel–Palestine crisis.

During a meeting with President of Israel Isaac Herzog and Czech President Miloš Zeman in July 2022, Černochová called Israel a strategic partner in the Middle East and supported further cooperation with Israel in the defence industry.

In September 2023, Černochová pushed through the purchase of 24 Lockheed Martin F-35 Lightning II for 150 billion CZK. She rejected the comparisons to Israel planning to buy F-35 fighters at half the price, stating that "the US and Israel share a specific relationship that is composed of extraordinary security guarantees as well as massive financial support and military deliveries, the scope of which is not widely known." According to estimates by the Czech Ministry of Defence, the total cost of acquiring and operating F-35 aircraft until the end of their useful life in 2069 will amount to 322 billion CZK.

At the beginning of Gaza war, Černochová put the Flag of Israel on Wenceslas Square to support Israel. On 28 October 2023, after the majority of member states of the United Nations (UN) voted for a resolution in the UN General Assembly calling for a humanitarian ceasefire between Israel and Hamas in the Gaza Strip, Černochová called for the Czech Republic to withdraw from the UN. According to Černochová, the Czech Republic "has nothing to do with an organization that supports terrorists and does not respect the basic right to self-defense".

== Policy positions ==
=== Gun rights ===
You who know me know that advocating legal gun ownership is a matter of principle for me, it's a matter of protecting liberty. The freedom to be able to defend oneself effectively with a weapon in the event of an attack, the freedom to sport with a legally owned firearm, to regulate game by hunting, and, de facto, to increase the defensibility of the Czech Republic as such. Which, as Minister for Defence, I will defend, and it is logical that my position has not changed.

— Minister of Defence Jana Černochová (January 2024)

Černochová is a prominent supporter of gun rights in the Czech Republic. In July 2018 she said that "advocacy of legal gun ownership should never cease to be a principled matter of protecting liberty", and in June 2017 referred to firearms as a "people's tool of freedom". She has advocated civilian preparations for armed resistance against terrorists, and is known for taking other members of parliament to a shooting range.

In May 2022, Černochová said that "while some others may like to buy handbags, I prefer purchases of firearms." She is a concealed carry license holder and carries a Glock 26 Olive Gen4. Among other firearms, she owns a special edition CZ 75B Operace Anthropoid pistol and a PAR MK3 rifle, a Czech-made AR 15 variant.

In 2025, Černochová received two Grand Power firearms from the Slovak Minister of Defense Robert Kaliňák, who stated that giving things that the gifted person likes is customary in international politics.

=== Islam ===
Following the November 2015 Paris attacks, Černochová called for a review of the European Union's migration policy and warned that "radical Islamists" were a threat to Europe. According to Černochová, "rules do not allow the freedom of our speech, religion, culture, and Judeo-Christian civilization to take a back seat at the expense of other non-religious aspects of Islamic ideology, which have nothing to do with the religious beliefs of women."

=== Middle East and Turkey ===
After the assassination of Jamal Khashoggi, Černochová called for an arms embargo on Saudi Arabia, to which the Czech Republic exported military material worth 70.1 million Euro in 2014.

In October 2019, Černochová criticised the 2019 Turkish offensive into north-eastern Syria and expressed concern that if Turkey resigned as NATO country, its influence would decrease. In March 2020, she condemned the regime of Turkish President Recep Tayyip Erdoğan and declared: "Turkey quite openly accompanies migrants to the border with Greece, thus threatens the entire European Union."

== Personal life ==
Černochová was in a relationship with fellow politician Martin Červíček in 2012.

== Awards ==
- Order of Princess Olga, 2st class (2022)
