= Alexandra Udženija =

Czech politician (born 1975)

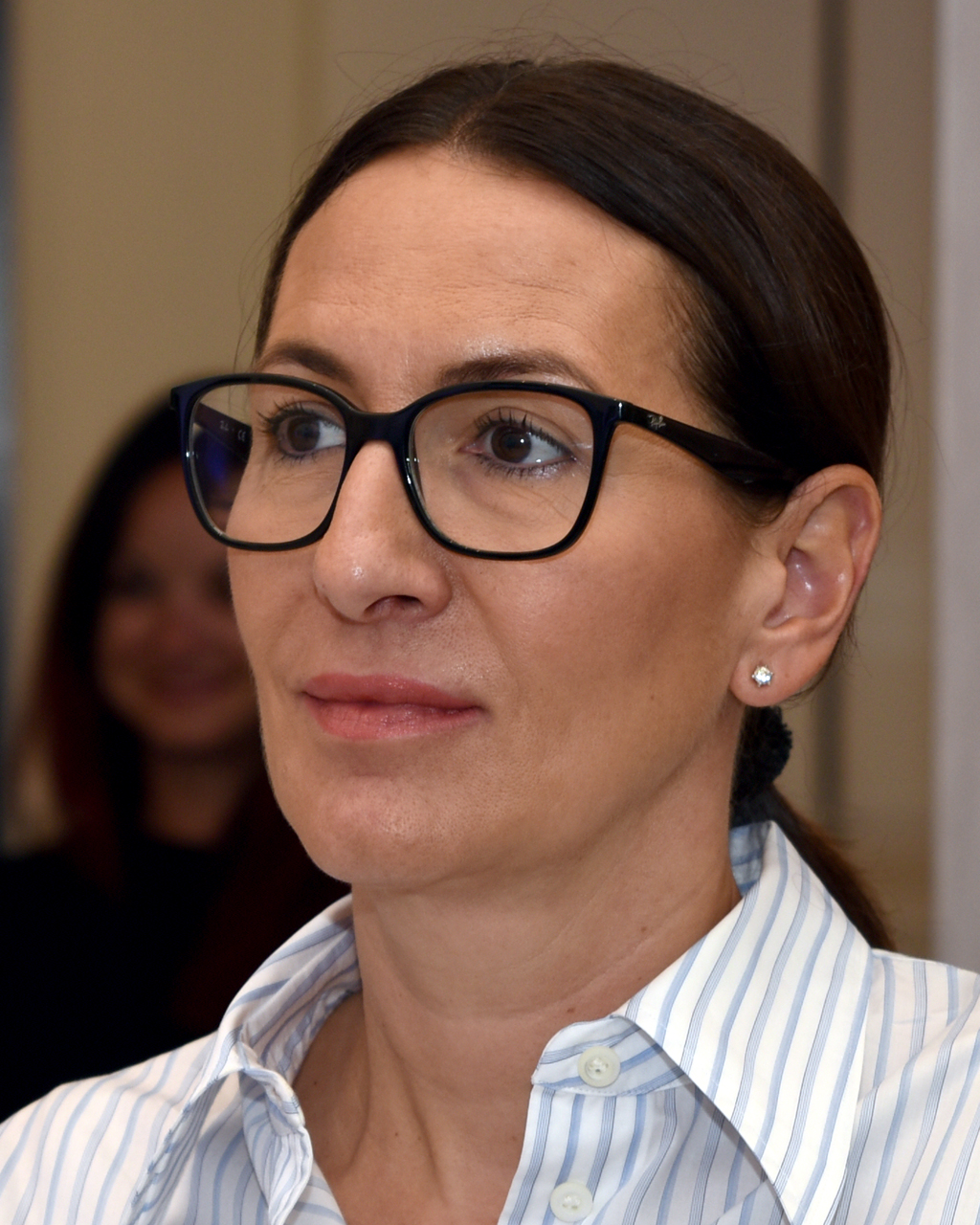
- Alexandra Udženija (2022)

Mayor of Prague 2
- Incumbent
- Assumed office 20 December 2021
- Preceded by: Jana Černochová

Personal details
- Born: 8 November 1975 (age 50) Belgrade, SR Serbia, SFR Yugoslavia
- Party: ODS (2003–present)
- Education: Anglo-American University; University of Economics, Prague
- Website: alexandraudzenija.cz

Alexandra Udženija (born 8 November 1975) is a Czech politician of Serbian descent.

== Biography ==
She studied economics at the University of Economics in Prague (VŠE) and other schools. In 2003 she joined the Civic Democratic Party (ODS) and represented the party in Prague municipal politics. In 2014, she became the deputy leader of ODS. She remained in the position until 18 January 2020 when she was replaced by Zbyněk Stanjura. In December 2020, Udženija replaced Jana Černochová as Mayor of Prague 2.
