= Marek Benda =

Czech politician

Marek Benda MP
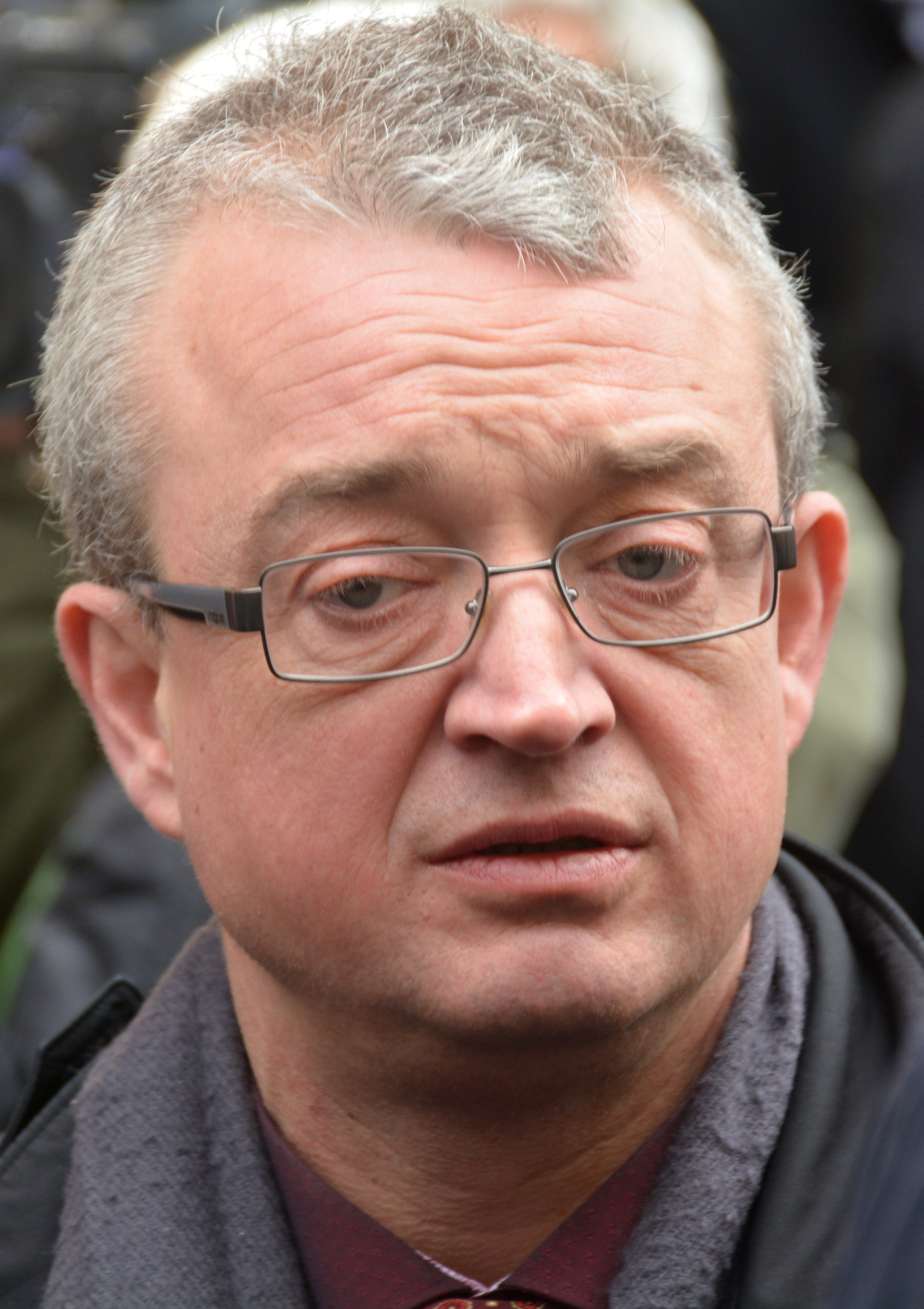

Leader of the Civic Democratic Party in the Chamber of Deputies
- Incumbent
- Assumed office 13 December 2021
- Preceded by: Zbyněk Stanjura
- In office 18 December 2012 – 28 August 2013
- Preceded by: Zbyněk Stanjura
- Succeeded by: Zbyněk Stanjura

Member of the Chamber of Deputies
- Incumbent
- Assumed office 20 July 2004
- In office 6 December 1990 – 20 June 2002

Personal details
- Born: 10 November 1968 (age 57) Prague, Czechoslovakia
- Party: ODS (since 1996); KDS (1990–1996)
- Spouse: Markéta Bendová
- Children: Johana; Jonáš; Apolena; Amálie
- Education: University of West Bohemia
- Website: http://www.marekbenda.cz/

Marek Benda (born 10 November 1968) is a Czech politician and member of the Civic Democratic Party (ODS). He is currently the longest serving member of the Chamber of Deputies of the Czech Republic, having served from 1990 to 2002, and then again from 2004 until present. Since 2021 he has been the leader of the ODS group in the Chamber of Deputies.

== Early life and education ==
Benda was born in 1968, the son of Roman Catholic intellectual and anti-communist dissident Václav Benda. He studied at the Faculty of Mathematics and Physics at Charles University from 1988 to 1990, but left the school during the Velvet Revolution as he was involved in politics. He later studied at the Faculty of Arts, Charles University in Prague, but did not complete his studies as he lacked the required skills in foreign languages.

Benda later studied law at the University of West Bohemia from 2003 to 2008. He initially passed a post-masters examination and earned a Doctor degree, but it was later revealed that his post-masters thesis was a work of plagiarism, and he did not receive the degree.

== Political career ==
Benda became a member of parliament in 1990. He was a co-founder of the Christian Democratic Party (KDS), which later merged with the Civic Democratic Party (ODS). Benda then became a member of ODS, and has represented the party in the Chamber of Deputies since then, except for a two-year break from 2002 to 2004, making him the longest serving member of the Chamber of Deputies. Since 2021 he has been the leader of the ODS parliamentary group.
