= Ivan Pilný =

Czech politician (born 1944)

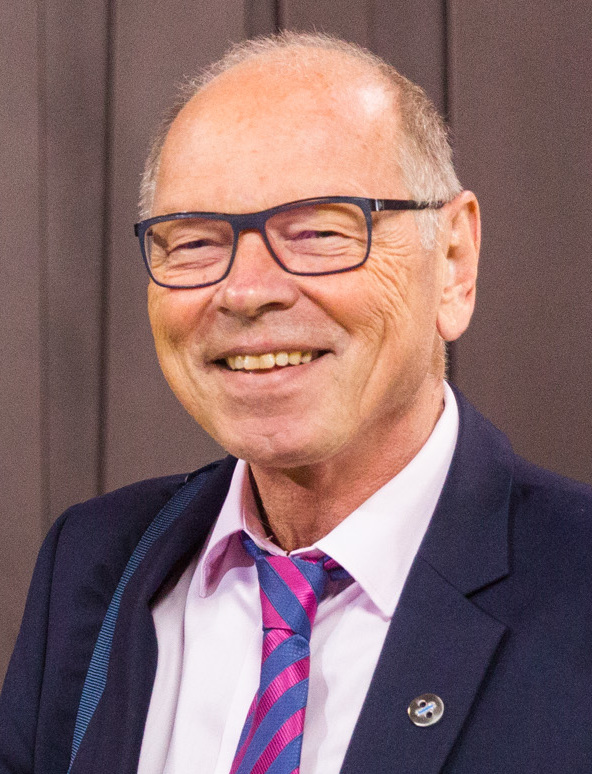

Minister of Finance
- In office 24 May 2017 – 13 December 2017
- Prime Minister: Bohuslav Sobotka
- Preceded by: Andrej Babiš
- Succeeded by: Alena Schillerová

Member of the Chamber of Deputies
- In office 26 October 2013 – 26 October 2017

Personal details
- Born: 6 July 1944 (age 82) Prague, Bohemia and Moravia (now Czech Republic)
- Party: ANO 2011 (2014–2021)
- Children: 4
- Education: Czech Technical University, Prague

Ivan Pilný (born 6 July 1944) is a Czech politician and former Microsoft executive who briefly served as Finance Minister of the Czech Republic from 24 May 2017 to 13 December 2017. From 2013 to 2017 Pilný was a member of the Chamber of Deputies (MP).

Political offices
Preceded by Andrej Babiš	Minister of Finance; 2017	Succeeded by Alena Schillerová
