= Radovesice =

- Municipality
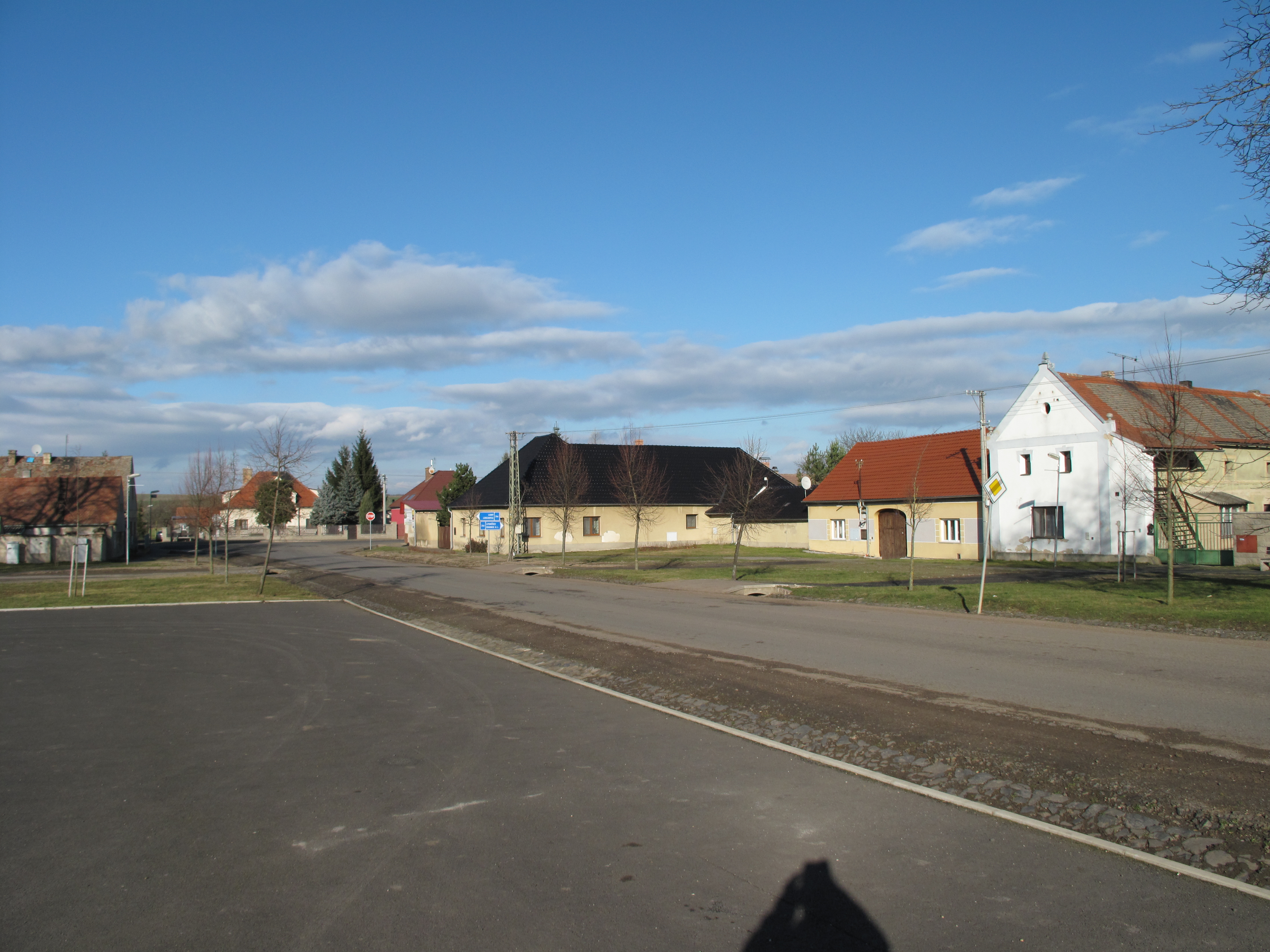
- Centre of Radovesice

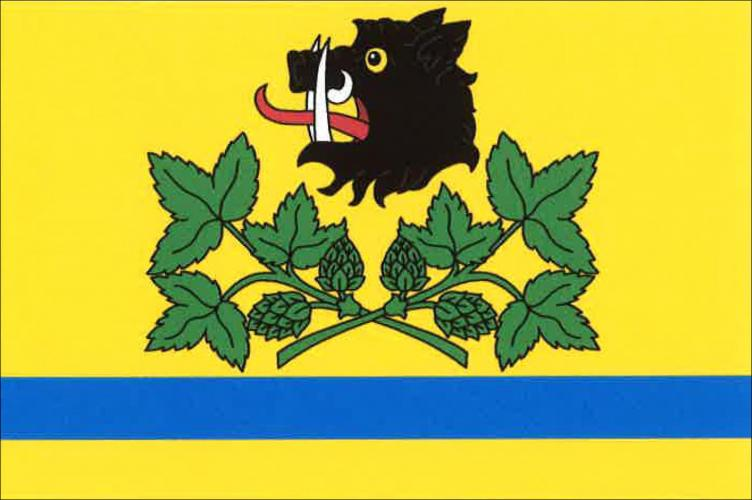
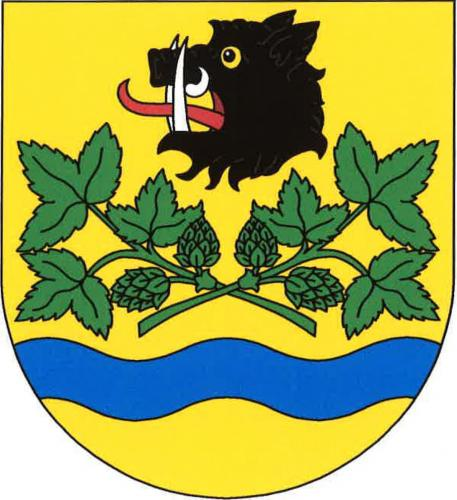
- Flag Coat of arms

- Location in the Czech Republic
- Coordinates: 50°24′40″N 14°4′6″E
- Country: Czech Republic
- Region: Ústí nad Labem
- District: Litoměřice
- First mentioned: 1175

Area
  - Total: 5.10 km^{2} (1.97 sq mi)
- Elevation: 168 m (551 ft)

Population (2026-01-01)
  - Total: 533
  - Density: 105/km^{2} (271/sq mi)
- Time zone: UTC+1 (CET)
  - Summer (DST): UTC+2 (CEST)
- Postal code: 410 02
- Website: www.radovesice.cz

Radovesice is a municipality and village in Litoměřice District in the Ústí nad Labem Region of the Czech Republic. It has about 500 inhabitants.

Radovesice lies approximately 15 kilometres (9 mi) south of Litoměřice, 28 km (17 mi) south of Ústí nad Labem, and 44 km (27 mi) north-west of Prague.

== Demographics ==
Historical population
| Year | Pop. | ±% |
|---|---|---|
| 1869 | 476 | — |
| 1880 | 602 | +26.5% |
| 1890 | 601 | −0.2% |
| 1900 | 621 | +3.3% |
| 1910 | 631 | +1.6% |
| 1921 | 699 | +10.8% |
| 1930 | 748 | +7.0% |
| 1950 | 508 | −32.1% |
| 1961 | 572 | +12.6% |
| 1970 | 556 | −2.8% |
| 1980 | 481 | −13.5% |
| 1991 | 402 | −16.4% |
| 2001 | 427 | +6.2% |
| 2011 | 461 | +8.0% |
| 2021 | 482 | +4.6% |
Source: Censuses
