= Zbyněk Stanjura =

Czech politician (born 1964)

- Stanjura in 2022

Minister of Finance
- In office 17 December 2021 – 15 December 2025
- Prime Minister: Petr Fiala
- Preceded by: Alena Schillerová
- Succeeded by: Alena Schillerová

Minister of Transport
- In office 12 December 2012 – 10 July 2013
- Prime Minister: Petr Nečas
- Preceded by: Pavel Dobeš
- Succeeded by: Zdeněk Žák

Leader of the Civic Democratic Party in the Chamber of Deputies
- In office 6 December 2013 – 13 December 2021
- Preceded by: Marek Benda
- Succeeded by: Marek Benda
- In office 11 May 2011 – 18 December 2012
- Preceded by: Petr Tluchoř
- Succeeded by: Marek Benda

Member of the Chamber of Deputies
- In office 29 May 2010 – 8 October 2025

Personal details
- Born: 15 February 1964 (age 62) Opava, Czechoslovakia
- Party: ODS
- Spouse: Hana Malurová
- Education: Brno University of Technology
- Website: stanjura.cz

Zbyněk Stanjura (born 15 February 1964) is a Czech politician who served as minister of finance in the cabinet of Petr Fiala from 17 December 2021 to 15 December 2025. He was previously appointed to the Cabinet of Petr Nečas on 12 December 2012, serving as minister of transport until July 2013. He was a member of the Chamber of Deputies from 2010 until 2025, representing the Civic Democratic Party (ODS), and previously served as Mayor of Opava from 2002 to 2010.

== Political career ==
=== Early political career ===
Stanjura was the mayor of Opava between 2002 and 2010. In the 2010 parliamentary election, he was elected to the Chamber of Deputies representing the Moravian-Silesian Region, from fourth place on the ODS candidate list. Stanjura became leader of the ODS parliamentary group on 11 May 2011. He served as minister of transport in the Cabinet of Petr Nečas from 2012 until 2013.

=== Post-Nečas Premiership ===
In the 2013 parliamentary election, Stanjura was the lead candidate for ODS in the Moravian-Silesian Region, and in November, he was again elected as leader of the ODS parliamentary group.

In the 2014 municipal elections, Stanjura was included on the ODS candidate list for Opava, but was not elected. For the 2017 parliamentary election, he was again lead candidate for ODS in the Moravian-Silesian Region, winning 3,648 preferential votes and defending his mandate as a deputy. On 24 October 2017, Stanjura was again elected leader of the ODS parliamentary group.

=== Minister of Finance ===
In the 2021 parliamentary election, Stanjura was the leader of the Spolu coalition's candidate list in the Moravian-Silesian Region, and was again elected as a deputy. He was re-elected as the leader of the ODS parliamentary group, but left the position in December and was replaced by Marek Benda.

Stanjura took office as minister of finance after the 2021 elections. His stated aim as finance minister has been to implement spending cuts and bring the fiscal deficit below 3% of gross domestic product.

Stanjura defended his position as first vice-chairman of ODS at the party's 30th Congress in April 2022, winning 477 votes. He defended the position again at the 31st party congress in April 2024, receiving 383 votes from 527 delegates.

== Controversy ==
Stanjura claimed to have sold his joint-stock company Eskon to his wife, Hana Malurová, in 2002. Aktuálně.cz reported that the sale of the company to his wife was to avoid the recently approved law requiring mayors to disclose their assets.

== Other activities ==
- European Bank for Reconstruction and Development (EBRD), ex-officio member of the board of governors (since 2021)
- European Investment Bank (EIB), ex-officio member of the board of governors (since 2021)
- World Bank, ex-officio member of the board of governors (since 2021)
