= Ministry of Finance (Czech Republic) =

Government ministry of the Czech Republic

Ministry of Finance Czech Republic
- Ministerstvo financí České republiky

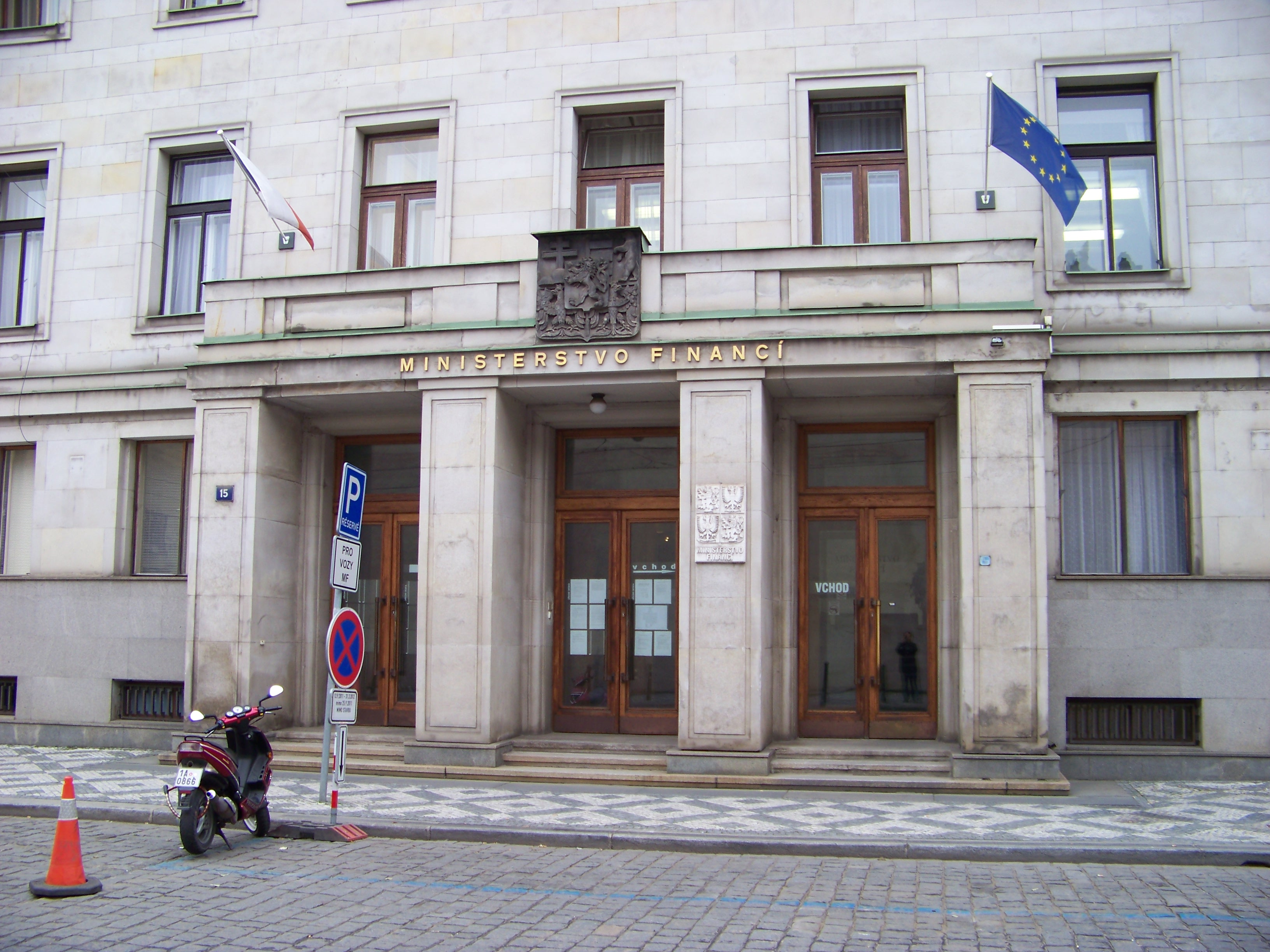

Agency overview
- Formed: 1969
- Jurisdiction: Czech Republic
- Headquarters: Letenská 15, 118 10 Prague 1 (Malá Strana); 50°5′20.94″N 14°24′25.89″E
- Agency executive: Alena Schillerová, Minister of Finance (List)
- Website: www.mfcr.cz/

The Ministry of Finance of the Czech Republic (Czech: Ministerstvo financí České republiky), abbreviated MFČR, is a government ministry, responsible for matters relating to economic policy, the government budget, revenue service, banking, security and insurance, international economic work, central, regional and local government.

The Ministry is administrated by the Finance Minister, who is member of the Cabinet. Since 15 December 2025 the minister has been Alena Schillerová.

== See also ==
- Finance Minister of the Czech Republic
