= Jaroslav Kubín =

Czech politician (1947–2025)

Senate member
- In office 2000–2006

Personal details
- Born: 25 November 1947 Poličná, Czechoslovakia
- Died: 8 December 2025 (aged 78)
- Party: Communist Party of Czechoslovakia

Jaroslav Kubín (25 November 1947 – 8 December 2025) was a Czech politician.

== Life ==
Kubín was born 25 November 1947 in Poličná. He entered municipal politics in the 1990s. He was the chairman of the municipal national committee of the Communist Party of Czechoslovakia. He was also the mayor of Rožnov pod Radhoštěm for a short time. He then ran a private law practice for three years. In 1994, he became the mayor of the city again and held it until 2000.

In the elections to the Senate of the Parliament of the Czech Republic in 2000, he was elected an independent senator, defeating the then senator Vladimír Oplast in both rounds. In the Senate, he was involved in the Constitutional and Legal Committee, where he held the position of vice-chairman from 2004 to 2006. He did not run in the elections to the Senate of the Parliament of the Czech Republic in 2006.

In 2000–2004, (he did not run in the regional elections in 2004) and again in 2008–2012, he sat in the Zlín Region Assembly, in both cases he was elected as a non-party member for the WMD movement. He did not stand as a candidate in the 2012 regional elections.

Kubín died on 8 December 2025, at the age of 78.
