= Cyril Svoboda =

Czech politician (born 1956)

The Honourable Cyril Svoboda
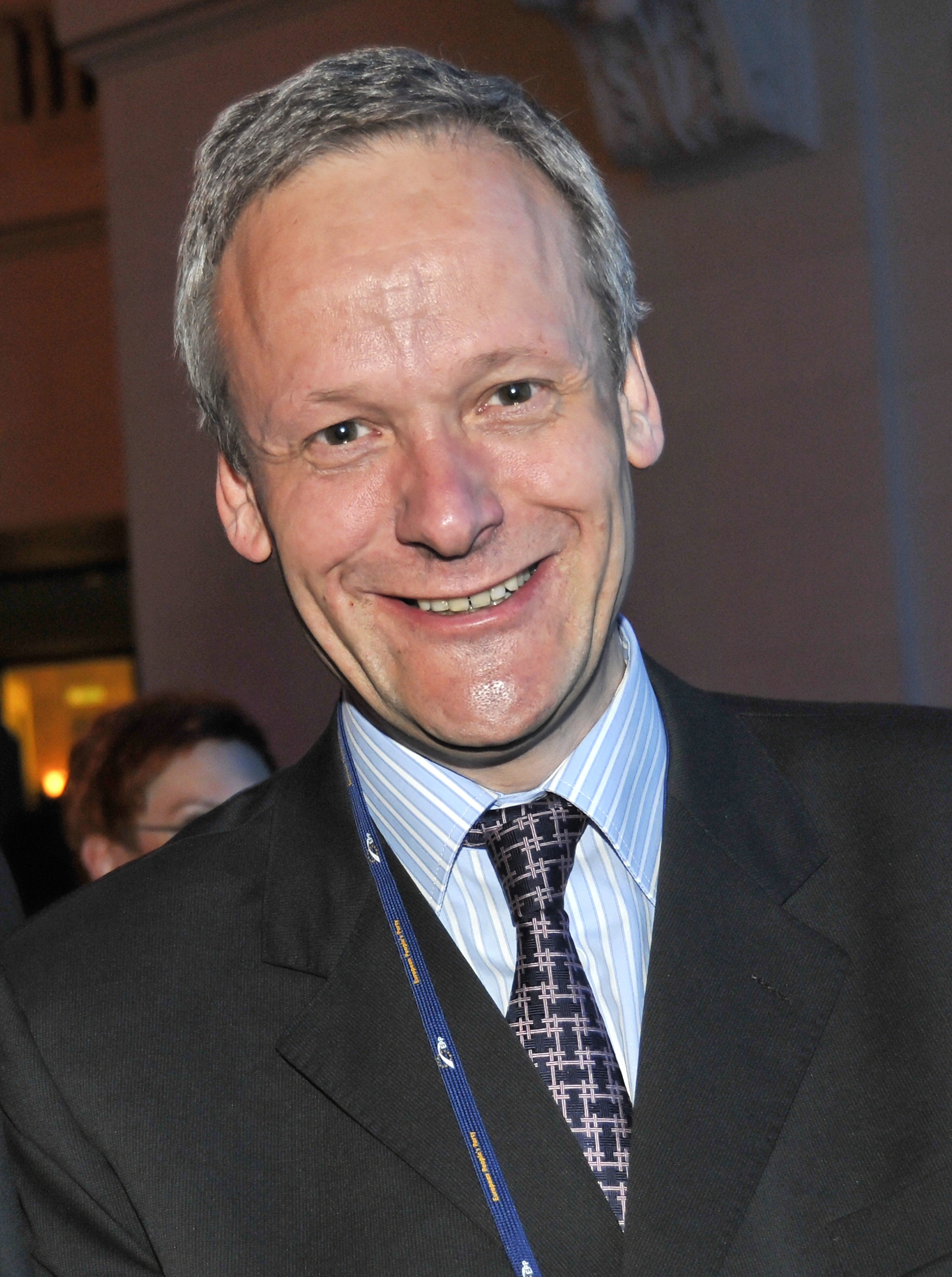

Deputy Prime Minister of the Czech Republic
- In office 15 July 2002 – 4 August 2004
- Prime Minister: Vladimír Špidla

Minister of Foreign Affairs
- In office 15 July 2002 – 16 August 2006
- Prime Minister: Vladimír Špidla; Stanislav Gross; Jiří Paroubek
- Preceded by: Jan Kavan
- Succeeded by: Alexandr Vondra

Leader of KDU-ČSL
- In office 30 May 2009 – 29 May 2010
- Preceded by: Jiří Čunek
- Succeeded by: Pavel Bělobrádek
- In office 26 May 2001 – 8 November 2003
- Preceded by: Jan Kasal
- Succeeded by: Miroslav Kalousek

Minister of Regional Development
- In office 23 January 2009 – 8 May 2009
- Prime Minister: Mirek Topolánek
- Preceded by: Jiří Čunek
- Succeeded by: Rostislav Vondruška

Minister without Portfolio Chairman of the Legislative Council
- In office 9 January 2007 – 23 January 2009
- Prime Minister: Mirek Topolánek
- Preceded by: Jiří Pospíšil
- Succeeded by: Pavel Svoboda

Minister of Interior
- In office 2 January 1998 – 22 July 1998
- Prime Minister: Josef Tošovský
- Preceded by: Jindřich Vodička
- Succeeded by: Václav Grulich

Member of the Chamber of Deputies
- In office 20 June 1998 – 3 June 2010

Personal details
- Born: 25 November 1956 (age 69) Prague, Czechoslovakia
- Party: KDU-ČSL
- Education: Charles University

Cyril Svoboda (born 25 November 1956) is a Czech politician, who was leader of the Christian and Democratic Union – Czechoslovak People's Party (KDU–ČSL) in 2001–2003 and 2009–2010, and a member of the Chamber of Deputies in 1998–2010. During his political career he held several ministerial positions, including Deputy Prime Minister (July 2002 – August 2004) and Minister of Foreign Affairs (July 2002–September 2006). He founded the Diplomatic Academy in Prague in 2011 and is currently lecturing at several universities in Prague.

== Early political career ==
After graduating from the Faculty of Law of Charles University in Prague in 1980, Svoboda worked as an in-house lawyer for the state gas supplier Transgas, and then as a notary public in Prague. He started his political career in 1990, shortly after the Velvet Revolution, as an adviser to the Deputy Prime Minister of the Czech and Slovak Federal Government on human rights and on relations between the Czech government and the churches.

Svoboda worked as an assistant at the Faculty of Law of Charles University while studying at the Pan American Institute for International Studies (Notre Dame University) in 1991. He became an adviser to the Prime Minister of the Czech and Slovak Federal Government in the same year, and then became Deputy Chairman of the Government Legislative Council in 1992. He joined KDU-ČSL in 1995. In 1996 he started working at the Ministry of Foreign Affairs as the Deputy Minister responsible for Czech accession to the EU, a process that he concluded as Minister of Foreign Affairs in 2004.

== Ministerial positions ==
Entering top level politics as the Czech Minister of the Interior (2 January 1998 – 23 July 1998) in the Government led by Josef Tošovský, Svodoba was also elected to the Chamber of Deputies on 20 June 1998. He spent the next four years as chairman of the Petitions Committee of the Chamber of Deputies.

Svoboda became leader of KDU-ČSL in 2001. After the parliamentary election in June 2002 his party formed a coalition with the Social Democrats and he became the Deputy Prime Minister and Minister of Foreign Affairs. He lost the leadership of his party to Miroslav Kalousek in 2003, and consequently the position of the Deputy Prime Minister a year later when Prime Minister Vladimír Špidla resigned. However, Svoboda remained as Minister of Foreign Affairs through all three governments in this four-year term, during which time he successfully finished the accession process of the Czech Republic to the European Union in April 2004.

When KDU-ČSL formed a coalition with the Civic Democratic Party (ODS) and the Green Party in 2007 Svodoba became a minister without portfolio and Chairman of the Government Legislative Council. During the Government "rejuvenation" in January 2009 he became Minister for Regional Development, but a few months later the Chamber of Deputies passed a motion of no confidence; the Government fell and was replaced by a caretaker government led by Jan Fischer.

== Retirement from politics ==
With KDU-ČSL splitting in 2009 and the breakaway faction forming TOP 09, Svoboda became leader of KDU-ČSL again, and led the party into the parliamentary elections in 2010. The weakened party did not gain any seats and he immediately resigned.

A year later Svoboda founded the Diplomatic Academy in Prague, focused on improving both public and private administration. He also returned to teaching and is currently teaching at the Anglo-American University in Prague and at the CEVRO Institute.

Svoboda is currently a Member of the Board of Advisors of the Global Panel Foundation, a non-governmental organisation working behind the scenes in crisis areas around the world.

== Family ==
Cyril Svoboda is married to Věnceslava Svobodová, a neurologist. They have four sons: Václav, Norbert and twins Radim and Vojtěch. Among his five other siblings, he has a twin brother Josef, also politically active within KDU-ČSL.

== Political roles ==
- January 1998 – July 1998: Minister of Interior
- May 2001 – November 2003: Chairman of KDU-ČSL
- 1998 – 2002: Chairman of the Petitions Committee of the Chamber of Deputies
- July 2002 – September 2006: Minister of Foreign Affairs
- July 2002 – August 2004: Deputy Prime Minister
- January 2007 – January 2009: Minister without Portfolio and Chairman of the Government's Legislative Council
- January 2009 – May 2009: Minister for Regional Development
- May 2009 – May 2010: Chairman of KDU-ČSL

== Decorations ==
- 2006: Decoration of Honour for Services to the Republic of Austria (Großes Goldenes Ehrenzeichen am Bande)
- 2008: Order of Merit of the Federal Republic of Germany (Grand Merit Cross with Star and Sash)
- 2012: Officer of the French Legion of Honour

Political offices
Preceded by Jan Kasal	Chairman of Christian Democrats; 2001-2003	Succeeded by Miroslav Kalousek

Political offices
Preceded by Jiří Čunek	Chairman of Christian Democrats; 2009-	Succeeded by Pavel Bělobrádek
