= Miroslav Kalousek =

Czech politician

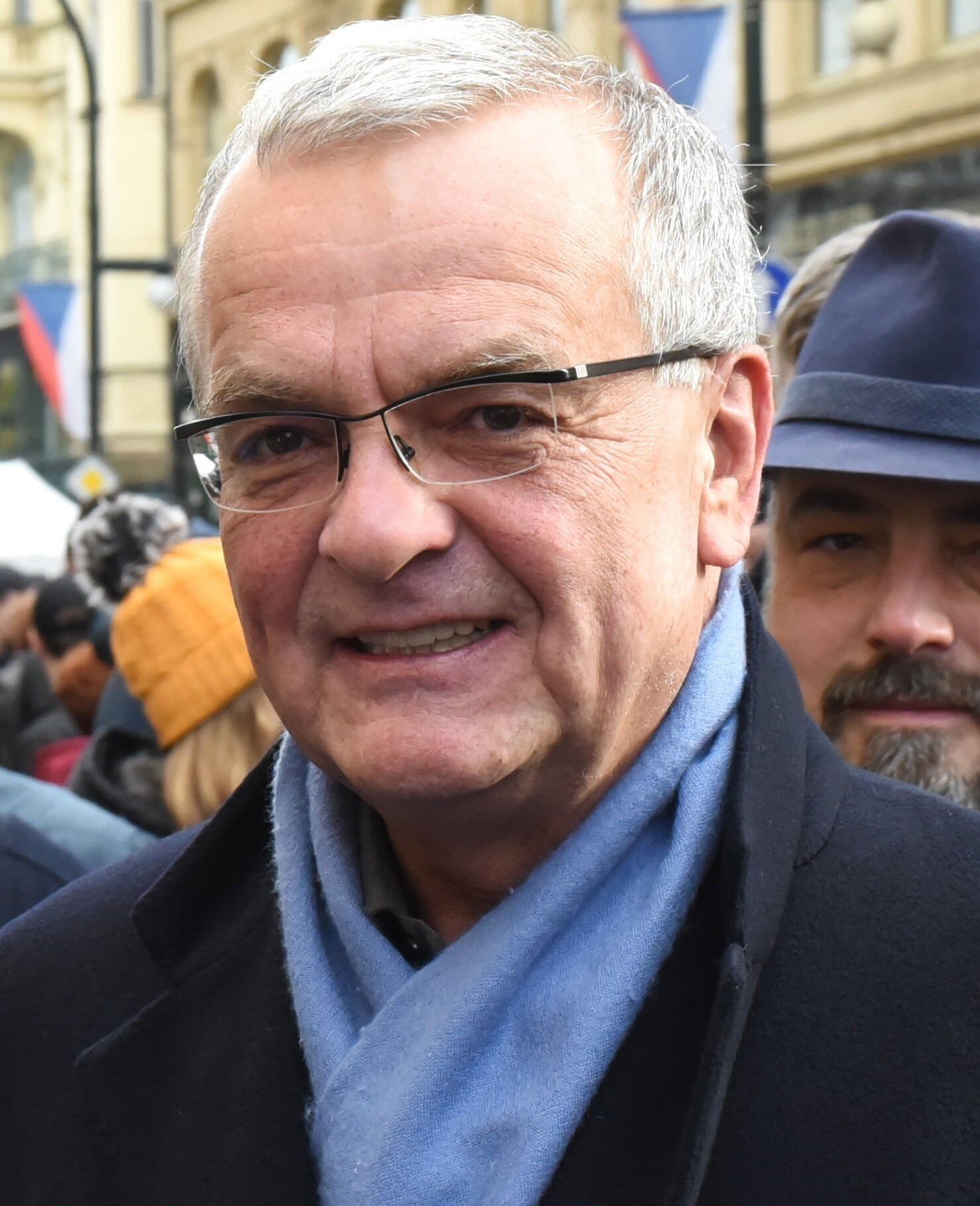
- Kalousek in 2023

Leader of TOP 09
- In office 29 November 2015 – 26 November 2017
- Preceded by: Karel Schwarzenberg
- Succeeded by: Jiří Pospíšil

Minister of Finance
- In office 13 July 2010 – 10 July 2013
- Prime Minister: Petr Nečas
- Preceded by: Eduard Janota
- Succeeded by: Jan Fischer
- In office 9 January 2007 – 8 May 2009
- Prime Minister: Mirek Topolánek
- Preceded by: Vlastimil Tlustý
- Succeeded by: Eduard Janota

Leader of KDU-ČSL
- In office 8 November 2003 – 25 August 2006
- Preceded by: Cyril Svoboda
- Succeeded by: Jiří Čunek

Member of the Chamber of Deputies
- In office 20 June 1998 – 19 January 2021
- Succeeded by: Jan Jakob

Personal details
- Born: 17 December 1960 (age 65) Tábor, Czechoslovakia (now Czech Republic)
- Party: KDU-ČSL (1984-2009); TOP 09 (2009-2024)
- Children: 2
- Education: UCT Prague
- Website: www.miroslav-kalousek.cz

Miroslav Kalousek (born 17 December 1960) is a Czech politician, former leader of KDU-ČSL and TOP 09, and a member of the Chamber of Deputies (MP) from 1998 until his resignation in 2021. He served twice as Finance Minister in the cabinets of Mirek Topolánek and then again from 2010 to 2013 in the government of Petr Nečas.

== Early life ==
Kalousek was born in Tábor. He studied chemistry at the Institute of Chemical Technology in Prague. Between 1984 and 1990, Kalousek worked as a technician at the company Mitas Praha. After the Velvet Revolution, Kalousek became a member of the state service. From 1993 to 1998, he was a deputy minister at the Ministry of Defense, responsible for the budget, army restructuring and acquisitions.

== Political career ==
=== Christian Democrats ===
In 1998, Kalousek was elected as an MP for the Christian Democrats. He was leader of the party from 2003 until 2006.

The 2006 parliamentary election resulted in no party or coalition of parties being able to form a viable government. Over several months a number of alternatives were negotiated with no result. On 24 August 2006 Kalousek unexpectedly accepted an offer from Jiří Paroubek to start negotiations on a minority government of KDU-ČSL and the Social Democratic Party (ČSSD) which would be supported by the Communists. The presidium of the party expressed no objections. Such negotiations were in conflict with pre-election promises and the vocal anti-communist stance of the party and its electorate. On 25 August 2006 mass protests by KDU-ČSL members, regional organisations and members of parliament went public. The party group in Brno (the biggest regional organisation) rejected the negotiated solution and requested the resignation of Kalousek and the whole presidium of KDU-ČSL. Other organisations made similar demands. Some members of parliament declared that they would refuse to support such a government. That evening the national committee of KDU-ČSL rejected the proposal by a large majority and Kalousek resigned. He has claimed his negotiation with Paroubek was intended to prevent a governing coalition of ČSSD and the Civic Democratic Party (ODS), which seemed like the most likely alternative scenario. In the end, ODS refused to participate in a "grand coalition" and formed a minority government.

In 2007, Kalousek was appointed as Finance Minister in Mirek Topolánek's cabinet, a position he held until the cabinet lost a vote of no-confidence in 2009.

=== TOP 09 ===
In 2009, Kalousek and Karel Schwarzenberg co-founded TOP 09, a pro-European, center-right, conservative political party. TOP 09 entered the parliament in the 2010 legislative election and joined a coalition government with ODS and Public Affairs (VV), with Kalousek becoming Minister of Finance for the second time.

Kalousek was re-elected as an MP in the 2013 legislative election, but lost the post of Finance Minister. In 2015, he was elected as leader of TOP 09, succeeding Karel Schwarzenberg. He announced in July 2020 that he would not be standing for election again, and resigned as an MP on 19 January 2021, arguing that the Chamber of Deputies would become a campaigning platform for the upcoming elections and seats should therefore be occupied by MPs due to stand in those elections.

Following his departure from politics he began presenting a show on TV Barrandov called Hovory Kalousek Soukup.

On 1 October 2024, Kalousek left the party, citing differences of opinion.

Media have been speculating about his possible political comeback. He is said to launch a new political party before the parliamentary election in 2025. As of October 29, 2024, he hasn’t either confirmed nor denied the speculations, despite being frequently asked by journalists.

== Political positions ==
Kalousek is a centre-right conservative, with neutral views on some civil rights issues such as same sex marriage. He called on members of parliament to vote for the bill in 2023, despite being conservative and seeing the word "marriage" as a symbol.

His economic policies as Finance Minister during the Great Recession were conservative, with an emphasis on fiscal caution and cutting government spending in order to balance the state budget as far as possible. Some of these policies were unpopular during his time in office, and were seen as too strict by some, but effective by others.

Kalousek is known for his pro-Tibet views, as well as his opposition to China's and Russia's foreign policies. Like many Czech politicians he supports Israel.

== Public image ==
Kalousek was named the best Minister of Finance of the 31 European developing economies in 2008, and again in 2011. In 2012, he was named "the most trusted finance minister of the European Union". Kalousek frequently clashed with Andrej Babiš following the latter's entry into Czech politics with his ANO 2011 party. Babiš led a negative campaign against Kalousek, describing him as a "symbol of corruption", and "a drunk and a thief" during parliamentary debates in 2015 and 2018. After the former incident, Kalousek took an alcohol test to prove that he was not drunk. His popularity among the Czech public dropped steadily prior to his resignation from the Chamber of Deputies; in 2017 he was the least trusted Czech politician, with 81% of respondents to an opinion poll saying they mistrusted him.

However, Kalousek remains a significant figure in Czech politics. He’s been largely critical of Petr Fiala’s cabinet, despite being a member of one of the ruling parties (TOP 09) until he left in October 2024.
