= List of MPs elected in the 2017 Czech parliamentary election =

Eighth Chamber of Deputies of the Czech Republic
←	7th	9th	→
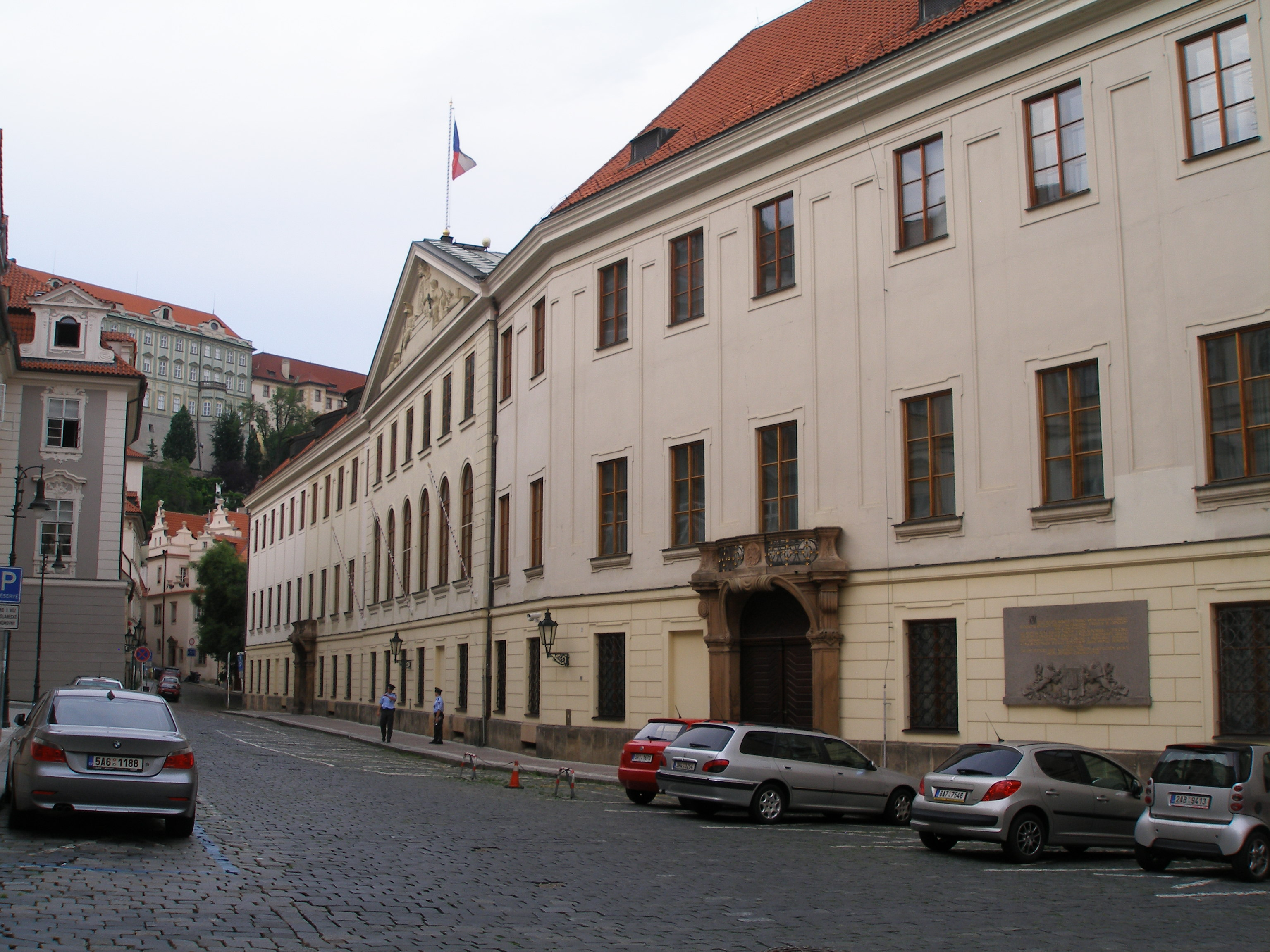

Overview
- Legislative body: Parliament of the Czech Republic
- Jurisdiction: Czech Republic
- Meeting place: Thun Palace
- Term: 20 November 2017 – 8 November 2021
- Election: 2017 Czech parliamentary election
- Members: 200

The 8th Chamber of Deputies is the assembled legislature of the lower house of the Parliament of the Czech Republic following the election held on 20 and 21 October 2017. All 200 Members of Parliament (MPs) were elected to serve a 4-year term.

== Current composition ==
Below is a graphical representation of the Chamber of Deputies showing a comparison of party strengths as it was directly after the 2017 election. The graphic is not a seating plan.

== List of elected MPs ==
Name	Party	Region	Notes
Petr Venhoda	ANO 2011	Prague	Became a Deputy on 1 October 2018, replacing Martin Stropnický
Robert Pelikán	ANO 2011	Prague	Minister of Justice since 13 December 2017
Věra Adámková	ANO 2011	Prague	
Patrik Nacher	ANO 2011	Prague	
Robert Králíček	ANO 2011	Prague	
Helena Válková	ANO 2011	Prague	
Andrej Babiš	ANO 2011	Central Bohemian	Prime Minister since 13 December 2017
Milan Hnilička	ANO 2011	Central Bohemian	
Andrea Brzobohatá	ANO 2011	Central Bohemian	
Jaroslava Pokorná Jermanová	ANO 2011	Central Bohemian	
František Petrtýl	ANO 2011	Central Bohemian	
Julius Špičák	ANO 2011	Central Bohemian	
Stanislav Berkovec	ANO 2011	Central Bohemian	
Marcela Melková	ANO 2011	Central Bohemian	
Přemysl Mališ	ANO 2011	Central Bohemian	
Radka Maxová	ANO 2011	South Bohemian	
Roman Kubíček	ANO 2011	South Bohemian	
Adam Vojtěch	ANO 2011	South Bohemian	Minister of Health since 13 December 2017
Karel Tureček	ANO 2011	South Bohemian	
Jan Kubík	ANO 2011	South Bohemian	
Karla Šlechtová	ANO 2011	Plzeň	Minister of Defence since 13 December 2017
Jan Volný	ANO 2011	Plzeň	
Miloslava Rutová	ANO 2011	Plzeň	
Barbora Kořanová	ANO 2011	Plzeň	
Kamal Farhan	ANO 2011	Plzeň	
Dan Ťok	ANO 2011	Karlovy Vary	Minister of Transport since 13 December 2017
Věra Procházková	ANO 2011	Karlovy Vary	
Jana Vildumetzová	ANO 2011	Karlovy Vary	
Richard Brabec	ANO 2011	Ústí nad Labem	Deputy Prime Minister; Minister for the Environment since 13 December 2017
Jan Richter	ANO 2011	Ústí nad Labem	
Pavel Růžička	ANO 2011	Ústí nad Labem	
Eva Fialová	ANO 2011	Ústí nad Labem	
Tomáš Kohoutek	ANO 2011	Ústí nad Labem	
Jaroslav Bžoch	ANO 2011	Ústí nad Labem	
Jan Schiller	ANO 2011	Ústí nad Labem	
Jiří Bláha	ANO 2011	Liberec	
Ivan Jáč	ANO 2011	Liberec	
Jana Pastuchová	ANO 2011	Liberec	
David Pražák	ANO 2011	Liberec	
Klára Dostálová	ANO 2011	Hradec Králové	Minister for Regional Development since 13 December 2017
Pavel Plzák	ANO 2011	Hradec Králové	
Petr Sadovský	ANO 2011	Hradec Králové	
Jiří Mašek	ANO 2011	Hradec Králové	
Jiří Hlavatý	ANO 2011	Hradec Králové	
Martin Kolovratník	ANO 2011	Pardubice	
Jan Řehounek	ANO 2011	Pardubice	
Jaroslav Kytýr	ANO 2011	Pardubice	
David Kasal	ANO 2011	Pardubice	
Jaroslav Faltýnek	ANO 2011	Vysočina	
Josef Kott	ANO 2011	Vysočina	
Monika Oborná	ANO 2011	Vysočina	
Radek Zlesák	ANO 2011	Vysočina	
Taťána Malá	ANO 2011	South Bohemian	
Karel Rais	ANO 2011	South Bohemian	
Miloslav Janulík	ANO 2011	South Bohemian	
Rostislav Vyzula	ANO 2011	South Bohemian	
Lenka Dražilová	ANO 2011	South Bohemian	
Pavel Staněk	ANO 2011	South Bohemian	
David Štolpa	ANO 2011	South Bohemian	
Ladislav Okleštěk	ANO 2011	Olomouc	
Petr Vrána	ANO 2011	Olomouc	
Milan Feranec	ANO 2011	Olomouc	
Adam Kalous	ANO 2011	Olomouc	
Milan Brázdil	ANO 2011	Olomouc	
Radek Vondráček	ANO 2011	Zlín	
Pavel Pustějovský	ANO 2011	Zlín	
Margita Balaštíková	ANO 2011	Zlín	
Marek Novák	ANO 2011	Zlín	
Ivo Vondrák	ANO 2011	Moravian-Silesian	
Josef Hájek	ANO 2011	Moravian-Silesian	
Aleš Juchelka	ANO 2011	Moravian-Silesian	
Pavel Juříček	ANO 2011	Moravian-Silesian	
Jiří Strýček	ANO 2011	Moravian-Silesian	
Josef Bělica	ANO 2011	Moravian-Silesian	
Stanislav Fridrich	ANO 2011	Moravian-Silesian	
Andrea Babišová	ANO 2011	Moravian-Silesian	
Zuzana Ožanová	ANO 2011	Moravian-Silesian	
Michal Ratiborský	ANO 2011	Moravian-Silesian	
Petr Dolínek	ČSSD	Prague	
Jan Hamáček	ČSSD	Central Bohemian	Leader of the Social Democratic Party
Kateřina Valachová	ČSSD	Central Bohemian	
Ondřej Veselý	ČSSD	South Bohemian	
Milan Chovanec	ČSSD	Plzeň	
Jaroslav Foldyna	ČSSD	Ústí nad Labem	
Jan Birke	ČSSD	Hradec Králové	
Jan Chvojka	ČSSD	Pardubice	
Jiří Běhounek	ČSSD	Vysočina	
Bohuslav Sobotka	ČSSD	South Moravian	
Roman Onderka	ČSSD	South Moravian	
Antonín Staněk	ČSSD	Olomouc	
Alena Gajdušíková	ČSSD	Zlín	
Lubomír Zaorálek	ČSSD	Moravian-Silesian	
Tomáš Hanzel	ČSSD	Moravian-Silesian	
Jan Čižinský	KDU-ČSL	Prague	
Jan Bartošek	KDU-ČSL	South Bohemian	
Pavel Bělobrádek	KDU-ČSL	Hradec Králové	Leader of KDU-ČSL
Marek Výborný	KDU-ČSL	Pardubice	
Vít Kaňkovský	KDU-ČSL	Vysočina	
Jiří Mihola	KDU-ČSL	South Moravian	
Stanislav Juránek	KDU-ČSL	South Moravian	
Marian Jurečka	KDU-ČSL	Olomouc	
Ondřej Benešík	KDU-ČSL	Zlín	
Pavla Golasowská	KDU-ČSL	Moravian-Silesian	
Jana Černochová	ODS	Prague	
Václav Klaus Jr.	Tricolour Citizens' Movement	Prague	Expelled from ODS on 16 March 2019; Formed Tricolour on 10 June 2019
Bohuslav Svoboda	ODS	Prague	
Marek Benda	ODS	Prague	
Pavel Žáček	ODS	Prague	
Jan Skopeček	ODS	Central Bohemian	
Veronika Vrecionová	ODS	Central Bohemian	
Vojtěch Munzar	ODS	Central Bohemian	
Martin Kupka	ODS	Central Bohemian	
Jan Zahradník	ODS	South Bohemian	
Jan Bauer	ODS	South Bohemian	
Ilona Mauritzová	ODS	Plzeň	
Martin Baxa	ODS	Plzeň	
Karel Krejza	ODS	Ústí nad Labem	
Petr Beitl	ODS	Liberec	
Ivan Adamec	ODS	Hradec Králové	
Jaroslav Martinů	ODS	Pardubice	
Miroslava Němcová	ODS	Vysočina	
Petr Fiala	ODS	South Bohemian	Leader of the Civic Democratic Party
Pavel Blažek	ODS	South Bohemian	
Jiří Ventruba	ODS	South Bohemian	Died of COVID-19 on 9 March 2021
Zuzana Majerová Zahradníková	Tricolour Citizens' Movement	Olomouc	Resigned from ODS on 17 March 2019; Joined Tricolour on 10 June 2019
Stanislav Blaha	ODS	Zlín	
Zbyněk Stanjura	ODS	Moravian-Silesian	
Jakub Janda	ODS	Moravian-Silesian	
Jakub Michálek	Pirates	Prague	
Dana Balcarová	Pirates	Prague	
Ondřej Profant	Pirates	Prague	
Olga Richterová	Pirates	Prague	
Jan Lipavský	Pirates	Prague	
Ivan Bartoš	Pirates	Central Bohemian	Leader of the Czech Pirate Party
Lenka Kozlová	Pirates	Central Bohemian	
František Kopřiva	Pirates	Central Bohemian	
Lukáš Kolařík	Pirates	South Bohemian	
Lukáš Bartoň	Pirates	Plzeň	
Petr Třešnák	Pirates	Karlovy Vary	
Mikuláš Peksa	Pirates	Ústí nad Labem	
Tomáš Martínek	Pirates	Liberec	
Martin Jiránek	Pirates	Hradec Králové	
Mikuláš Fernjenčík	Pirates	Pardubice	
Jan Pošvář	Pirates	Vysočina	
Radek Holomčík	Pirates	South Bohemian	
Tomáš Vymazal	Pirates	South Bohemian	
Vojtěch Pikal	Pirates	Olomouc	
František Elfmark	Pirates	Zlín	
Lukáš Černohorský	Pirates	Moravian-Silesian	
Ondřej Polanský	Pirates	Moravian-Silesian	
Jiří Kobza	SPD	Prague	
Tomio Okamura	SPD	Central Bohemian	Leader of Freedom and Direct Democracy
Radek Rozvoral	SPD	Central Bohemian	
Miloslav Rozner	SPD	South Bohemian	
Jana Levová	SPD	Plzeň	
Karla Maříková	SPD	Karlovy Vary	
Tereza Hyťhová	Tricolour Citizens' Movement	Ústí nad Labem	Left SPD on 27 July 2020
Monika Jarošová	SPD	Ústí nad Labem	
Radovan Vích	SPD	Liberec	
Zdeněk Podal	SPD	Hradec Králové	
Jiří Kohoutek	SPD	Pardubice	
Radek Koten	SPD	Vysočina	
Jan Hrnčíř	SPD	South Bohemian	
Lucie Šafránková	SPD	South Bohemian	
Lubomír Španěl	SPD	South Bohemian	
Radim Fiala	SPD	Olomouc	
Pavel Jelínek	SPD	Olomouc	
Jaroslav Holík	SPD	Zlín	
Jaroslav Dvořák	SPD	Zlín	
Lubomír Volný	Unified – Alternative for Patriots	Moravian-Silesian	Left SPD in March 2019
Marian Bojko	Unified – Alternative for Patriots	Moravian-Silesian	Left SPD in March 2019
Ivana Nevludová	Unified – Alternative for Patriots	Moravian-Silesian	Left SPD in March 2019
Jiří Dolejš	Communist	Prague	
Stanislav Grospič	Communist	Central Bohemian	
Miloslava Vostrá	Communist	Central Bohemian	
Vojtěch Filip	Communist	South Bohemian	Leader of the Communist Party
Jiří Valenta	Communist	Plzeň	
Hana Aulická Jírovcová	Communist	Ústí nad Labem	
Zdeněk Ondráček	Communist	Hradec Králové	
Květa Matoušková	Communist	Pardubice	
Pavel Kováčik	Communist	Vysočina	
Ivo Pojezný	Communist	South Moravian	
Miroslav Grebeníček	Communist	South Moravian	
Alexander Černý	Communist	Olomouc	
Vladimír Koníček	Communist	Zlín	
Leo Luzar	Communist	Moravian-Silesian	
Daniel Pawlas	Communist	Moravian-Silesian	
Karel Schwarzenberg	TOP 09	Prague	
Markéta Adamová	TOP 09	Prague	Leader of TOP 09 (since 24 November 2019)
Dominik Feri	TOP 09	Prague	
Miroslav Kalousek	TOP 09	Central Bohemian	
Helena Langšádlová	TOP 09	Central Bohemian	
František Vácha	TOP 09	South Bohemian	
Vlastimil Válek	TOP 09	South Moravian	
Jan Farský	STAN	Prague	
Vít Rakušan	STAN	Central Bohemian	
Věra Kovářová	STAN	Central Bohemian	
Martin Půta	STAN	Liberec	
Jana Krutáková	STAN	South Moravian	
Petr Gazdík	STAN	Zlín	Leader of Mayors and Independents
