= List of MPs elected in the 2013 Czech parliamentary election =

Seventh Chamber of Deputies of the Czech Republic
←	6th	8th	→
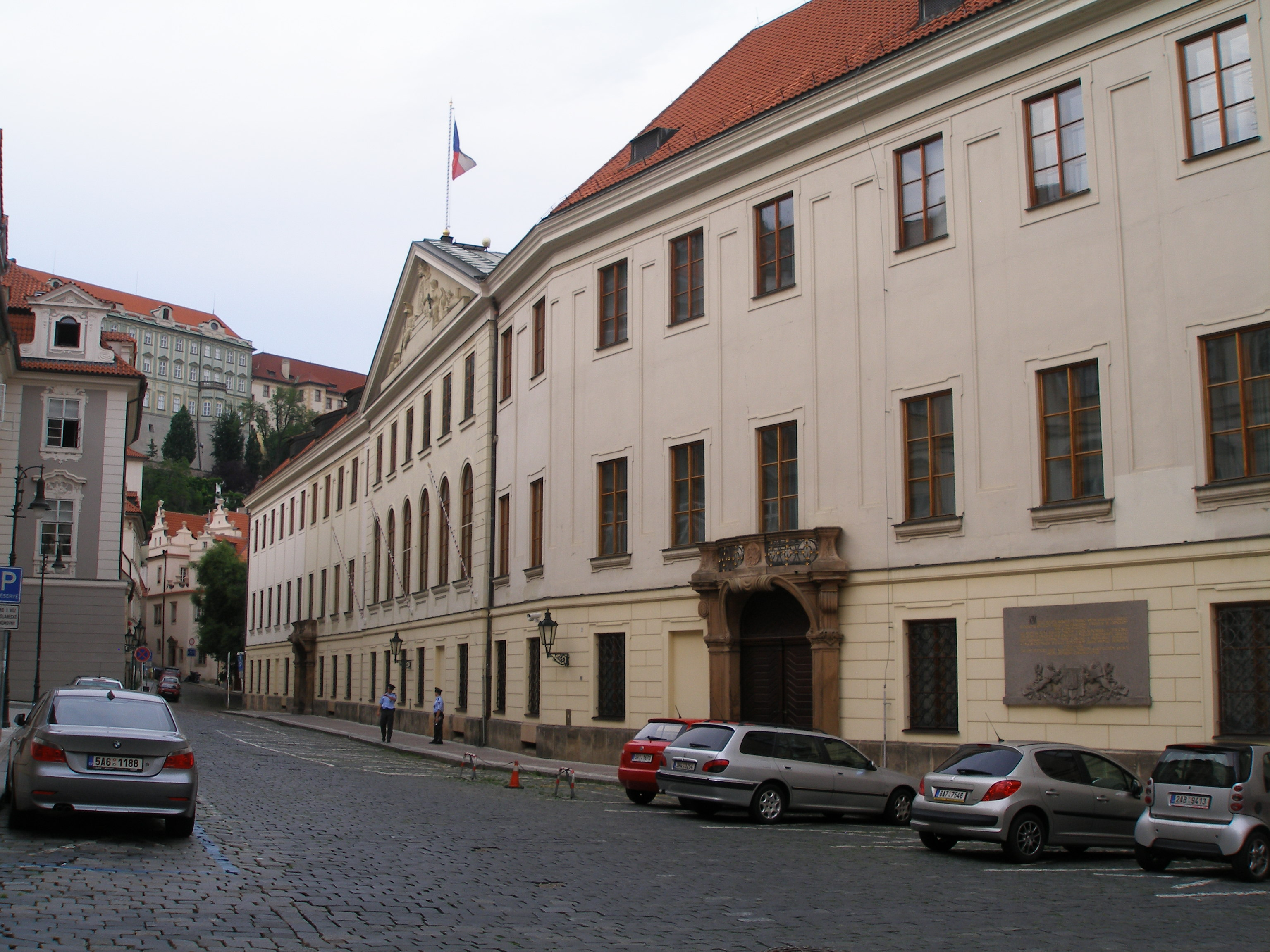

Overview
- Legislative body: Parliament of the Czech Republic
- Jurisdiction: Czech Republic
- Meeting place: Thun Palace
- Term: 27 November 2013 – 26 October 2017
- Election: 2013 Czech parliamentary election
- Government: Cabinet of Bohuslav Sobotka
- Members: 200
- Speaker: Jan Hamáček
- Prime Minister: Bohuslav Sobotka
- Party control: ČSSD—ANO 2011—KDU-ČSL

The 7th Chamber of Deputies is the legislature of the lower house of the Parliament of the Czech Republic following the 2013 parliamentary election, to elect 200 Members of Parliament (MPs).

== Results of election (October 2013) ==
National party	Chairperson	Seats	±
ČSSD	Bohuslav Sobotka	50 / 200	▼6
ANO 2011	Andrej Babiš	47 / 200	▲47
KSČM	Vojtěch Filip	33 / 200	▲6
TOP 09	Karel Schwarzenberg	26 / 200	▼16
ODS	Petr Fiala	16 / 200	▼32
Dawn	Tomio Okamura	14 / 200	▲14
KDU-ČSL	Pavel Bělobrádek	14 / 200	▲14

== List of MPs (Deputies) ==
Name	Party	Region	Notes
Petr Adam	Dawn (until September 2015); Independent (after September 2015)	South Moravian	
Vojtěch Adam	Communist	South Moravian	
Ivan Adamec	Civic Democratic Party	Hradec Králové	
František Adámek	Social Democracy	Prague	
Markéta Adamová	TOP 09	Prague	
Augustin Karel Andrle Sylor	Dawn	Pardubice	
Pavel Antonín	Social Democracy	Vysočina	
Hana Aulická Jírovcová	Communist	Ústí nad Labem	
Andrej Babiš	ANO 2011	Prague	First Deputy Prime Minister and Finance Minister (until 24 May 2017)
Miloš Babiš	ANO 2011	Central Bohemian	
Miloslav Bačiak	ANO 2011	Vysočina	Left the Parliament on 19 November 2013
Margita Balaštíková	ANO 2011	Zlín	
Jan Bartošek	KDU-ČSL	South Bohemian	
Zuzka Bebarová-Rujbrová	Communist	South Moravian	
Jiří Běhounek	Social Democracy	Vysočina	
Pavel Bělobrádek	KDU-ČSL	Hradec Králové	Deputy Prime Minister and Minister of Science and Research
Marek Benda	Civic Democratic Party	Prague	
Petr Bendl	Civic Democratic Party	Central Bohemian	
Ondřej Benešík	KDU-ČSL	Zlín	
Marie Benešová	Social Democracy	Ústí nad Labem	
Martina Berdychová	ANO 2011	Hradec Králové	
Stanislav Berkovec	ANO 2011	Central Bohemian	
Zdeněk Bezecný	TOP 09	South Bohemian	
Adolf Beznoska	Civic Democratic Party	Central Bohemian	Left the parliament on 14 March 2017 to join the Supreme Audit Office.
Jan Birke	Social Democracy	Hradec Králové	
Pavel Blažek	Civic Democratic Party	South Moravian	
Vlasta Bohdalová	Social Democracy	South Bohemian	Became a Deputy on 31 March 2014
Robin Böhnisch	Social Democracy	Hradec Králové	
Jaroslav Borka	Communist	Karlovy Vary	
Richard Brabec	ANO 2011	Ústí nad Labem	Environment Minister
Milan Brázdil	ANO 2011	Olomouc	
Marek Černoch	Dawn (until June 2017); Independent (after June 2017)	Central Bohemian	
Jana Černochová	Civic Democratic Party	Prague	
Alexander Černý	Communist	Olomouc	
Karel Černý	Social Democracy	Vysočina	
Pavel Čihák	ANO 2011	Central Bohemian	
René Číp	Communist	Moravian-Silesian	
Ivana Dobešová	ANO 2011	Central Bohemian	
Richard Dolejš	Social Democracy	Central Bohemian	
Jiří Dolejš	Communist	Prague	
Jaroslav Faltýnek	ANO 2011	Olomouc	
Jan Farský	TOP 09	Liberec	
Petr Fiala	Civic Democratic Party	South Moravian	
Radim Fiala	Dawn (until May 2015); Freedom and Direct Democracy (after May 2015)	Olomouc	
Matěj Fichtner	ANO 2011	Prague	Became a Deputy on 26 October 2013
Karel Fiedler	Dawn (until 29 February 2016); Independent (after February 2016)	Moravian-Silesian	
Vojtěch Filip	Communist	South Bohemian	
Jana Fischerová	Civic Democratic Party	Vysočina	
Jaroslav Foldyna	Social Democracy	Ústí nad Labem	
Ivan Gabal	KDU-ČSL	Central Bohemian	
Vlastimil Gabrhel	Social Democracy	South Moravian	Became a Deputy on 30 April 2014, replacing Michal Hašek
Petr Gazdík	TOP 09	Zlín	
Pavla Golasowská	KDU-ČSL	Moravian-Silesian	Became a Deputy on 8 December 2014
Miroslav Grebeníček	Communist	South Moravian	
Stanislav Grospič	Communist	Central Bohemian	
Josef Hájek	ANO 2011	Moravian-Silesian	
Milada Halíková	Communist	Moravian-Silesian	
Jan Hamáček	Social Democracy	Central Bohemian	Speaker of the Chamber of Deputies
Michal Hašek	Social Democracy	South Moravian	Left the parliament on 30 April 2014
Pavel Havíř	Social Democracy	Pardubice	
Olga Havlová	Dawn	Moravian-Silesian	
Leoš Heger	TOP 09	Hradec Králové	
Daniel Herman	KDU-ČSL	Prague	Minister of Culture
Jana Hnyková	Dawn (until June 2017); Independent (after June 2017)	Liberec	
Jiří Holeček	ANO 2011	Prague	
Radim Holeček	Civic Democratic Party	Ústí nad Labem	
Jaroslav Holík	Dawn (until July 2015); Freedom and Direct Democracy (after July 2015)	Zlín	
Pavel Holík	Social Democracy	Olomouc	
Václav Horáček	TOP 09	Liberec	
Ludvík Hovorka	KDU-ČSL	Zlín	
Gabriela Hubáčková	Communist	Ústí nad Labem	
Stanislav Huml	Social Democracy	Central Bohemian	
Jitka Chalánková	TOP 09	Olomouc	
Bohuslav Chalupa	ANO 2011	South Moravian	
Milan Chovanec	Social Democracy	Plzeň	Interior Minister
Jan Chvojka	Social Democracy	Pardubice	Minister for Human Rights and Equal Opportunities (from 1 December 2016)
Igor Jakubčík	Social Democracy	Plzeň	
Vítězslav Jandák	Social Democracy	South Bohemian	Left the parliament on 9 June 2017
Miloslav Janulík	ANO 2011	South Moravian	
Barbora Jelonková	Social Democracy	Moravian-Silesian	Became a Deputy on 1 July 2017
Jaroslava Jermanová	ANO 2011	Central Bohemian	Left the parliament on 3 January 2017
Věra Jourová	ANO 2011	Vysočina	Minister of Regional Development from 29 January to 8 October 2014. Left the parliament on 21 October 2014 to become European Commissioner for Justice, Consumers and Gender Equality.
Jiří Junek	KDU-ČSL	Pardubice	
Marian Jurečka	KDU-ČSL	Olomouc	Minister of Agriculture
David Kádner	Dawn	Ústí nad Labem	
Zuzana Kailová	Social Democracy	Ústí nad Labem	
Miroslav Kalousek	TOP 09	Central Bohemian	
Vít Kaňkovský	KDU-ČSL	Vysočina	
Simeon Karamazov	Civic Democratic Party	Pardubice	
David Kasal	ANO 2011	Pardubice	
Jan Klán	Communist	Central Bohemian	
Jaroslav Klaška	KDU-ČSL	South Moravian	
Václav Klučka	Social Democracy	Moravian-Silesian	
Martin Kolovratník	ANO 2011	Pardubice	
Martin Komárek	ANO 2011	Liberec	
Kateřina Konečná			
Vladimír Koníček	Communist	Zlín	
Daniel Korte	TOP 09	Prague	
Petr Kořenek	Social Democracy	Zlín	
Jiří Koskuba	Social Democracy	Prague	
Rom Kostřica	TOP 09	South Moravian	
Josef Kott	ANO 2011	Vysočina	
Jiří Koubek	TOP 09	Prague	
Pavel Kováčik	Communist	Vysočina	
Věra Kovářová	TOP 09	Central Bohemian	
Jaroslav Krákora	Social Democracy	Ústí nad Labem	
Roman Kubíček	ANO 2011	South Bohemian	
Michal Kučera	TOP 09	Ústí nad Labem	
Petr Kudela	KDU-ČSL	Moravian-Silesian	
Helena Langšádlová	TOP 09	Central Bohemian	
Martin Lank	Dawn (until May 2017); Independent (after May 2017)	Vysočina	
František Laudát	TOP 09	Prague	
Jaroslav Lobkowicz	TOP 09	Plzeň	
Jana Lorencová	ANO 2011	Moravian-Silesian	
Leo Luzar	Communist	Moravian-Silesian	Became a Deputy on 1 July 2014
Stanislav Mackovík	Communist	Liberec	
Soňa Marková	Communist	Hradec Králové	
Květa Matušovská	Communist	Pardubice	
Radka Maxová	ANO 2011	South Bohemian	
Jiří Mihola	KDU-ČSL	South Moravian	
Jan Mládek	Social Democracy	South Bohemian	Minister of Industry and Trade
Josef Nekl	Communist	Olomouc	
Miroslava Němcová	Civic Democratic Party	Prague	
Alena Nohavová	Communist	South Bohemian	
Nina Nováková	TOP 09	Central Bohemian	
Josef Novotný	Social Democracy	Karlovy Vary	
Martin Novotný	Civic Democratic Party	Olomouc	
Igor Nykl	ANO 2011	Moravian-Silesian	
Pavlína Nytrová	Social Democracy	Moravian-Silesian	
Tomio Okamura	Dawn – National Coalition (until May 2015); Freedom and Direct Democracy (after May 2015)	Central Bohemian	Leader of Freedom and Direct Democracy.
Ladislav Okleštěk	ANO 2011	Olomouc	
Zdeněk Ondráček	Communist	Hradec Králové	
Miroslav Opálka	Communist	Moravian-Silesian	
Jana Pastuchová	ANO 2011	Liberec	
Herbert Pavera	TOP 09	Moravian-Silesian	
Gabriela Pecková	TOP 09	Prague	
Marie Pěnčíková	Communist	Zlín	
Miloš Petera			
František Petrtýl	ANO 2011	Central Bohemian	Became a Deputy on 3 January 2017, replacing Jaroslava Jermanová
Jiří Petrů	Social Democracy	South Moravian	
Stanislav Pfléger	ANO 2011	Ústí nad Labem	
Ivan Pilný	ANO 2011	Hradec Králové	Finance Minister (from 24 May 2017)
Lukáš Pleticha	Social Democracy	Liberec	
Martin Plíšek	TOP 09	Prague	Became a Deputy on 1 July 2014
Pavel Ploc	Social Democracy	Liberec	
Pavel Plzák	ANO 2011	Hradec Králové	
Tomáš Podivínský			
Ivo Pojezný	Communist	South Moravian	
Stanislav Polčák			
Jiří Pospíšil	Civic Democratic Party	Plzeň	Left the parliament on 20 June 2014 to become a Member of the European Parliament for TOP 09.
Karel Pražák		South Bohemian	
Roman Procházka	ANO 2011	Karlovy Vary	
Anna Putnová	TOP 09	South Moravian	
Karel Rais	ANO 2011	South Moravian	
Miloslava Rutová	ANO 2011	Plzeň	Became a Deputy on 14 January 2016
Adam Rykala	Social Democracy	Moravian-Silesian	
Antonín Seďa	Social Democracy	Zlín	
Jan Sedláček	ANO 2011	Moravian-Silesian	
Martin Sedlář	ANO 2011	Moravian-Silesian	
Marta Semelová	Communist	Prague	
Bronislav Schwarz	ANO 2011	Ústí nad Labem	
Karel Schwarzenberg	TOP 09	Prague	
Jiří Skalický	TOP 09	Pardubice	
Roman Sklenák	Social Democracy	South Moravian	
Jan Skopeček	Civic Democratic Party	Central Bohemian	Became a Deputy on 14 March 2017, replacing Adolf Beznoska.
Václav Snopek	Communist	Pardubice	
Bohuslav Sobotka	Social Democracy	South Moravian	Prime Minister (see Bohuslav Sobotka's Cabinet)
Jan Sobotka			
Zdeněk Soukup	ANO 2011	Karlovy Vary	
Zbyněk Stanjura	Civic Democratic Party	Moravian-Silesian	
Miroslava Strnadlová	Social Democracy	Zlín	
Martin Stropnický	ANO 2011	South Moravian	Minister of Defence
Štěpán Stupčuk	Social Democracy	Prague	
Bohuslav Svoboda	Civic Democratic Party	Prague	
Zdeněk Syblík	Social Democracy	Central Bohemian	Became a Deputy on 28 August 2014
Zuzana Šánová	ANO 2011	Vysočina	Became a Deputy on 21 October 2014, replacing Věra Jourová.
Milan Šarapatka		Prague	
Josef Šenfeld	Communist	Ústí nad Labem	
Karel Šidlo	Communist	Plzeň	
Ladislav Šincl			
Pavel Šrámek	ANO 2011	Plzeň	
Jiří Štětina	Dawn	Hradec Králové	
Jeroným Tejc	Social Democracy	South Moravian	
Lubomír Toufar	Social Democracy	South Moravian	
Karel Tureček	TOP 09 (until 10 March 2016); ANO 2011 (after 10 March 2016)	Vysočina	
Josef Uhlík	KDU-ČSL	South Moravian	
Milan Urban	Social Democracy	Central Bohemian	
Dana Váhalová	Social Democracy	Moravian-Silesian	
František Vácha	TOP 09	South Bohemian	
Jiří Valenta	Communist	Plzeň	
Václav Valhoda	Social Democracy	South Bohemian	Became a Deputy on 9 June 2017
Helena Válková	ANO 2011	Prague	Minister of Justice (until 1 March 2015)
Roman Váňa	Social Democracy	Olomouc	
Ladislav Velebný	Social Democracy	Moravian-Silesian	
Vladislav Vilímec	Civic Democratic Party	Plzeň	Became a Deputy on 20 June 2014, replacing Jiří Pospíšil.
Pavel Volčík	ANO 2011	Zlín	
Jan Volný	ANO 2011	Plzeň	
Radek Vondráček	ANO 2011	Zlín	
Josef Vondrášek	Communist	Central Bohemian	
Miloslava Vostrá	Communist	Central Bohemian	
Václav Votava	Social Democracy	Plzeň	
Josef Vozdecký			
Vlastimil Vozka	ANO 2011	Ústí nad Labem	
Rostislav Vyzula	ANO 2011	South Moravian	
Markéta Wernerová	Social Democracy	Karlovy Vary	
Josef Zahradníček	Communist	Vysočina	
Jan Zahradník	Civic Democratic Party	South Bohemian	
Lubomír Zaorálek	Social Democracy	Moravian-Silesian	Minister of Foreign Affairs
Jaroslav Zavadil	Social Democracy	Prague	
Kristýna Zelienková	TOP 09	Central Bohemian	
Jiří Zemánek	Social Democracy	Olomouc	
Václav Zemek	Social Democracy	Central Bohemian	
Jiří Zimola			
Jiří Zlatuška	ANO 2011	Prague	
Marek Ženíšek	TOP 09	Plzeň	
