= 2020 KDU–ČSL leadership election =

Czech political party leadership election

- 25 January 2020
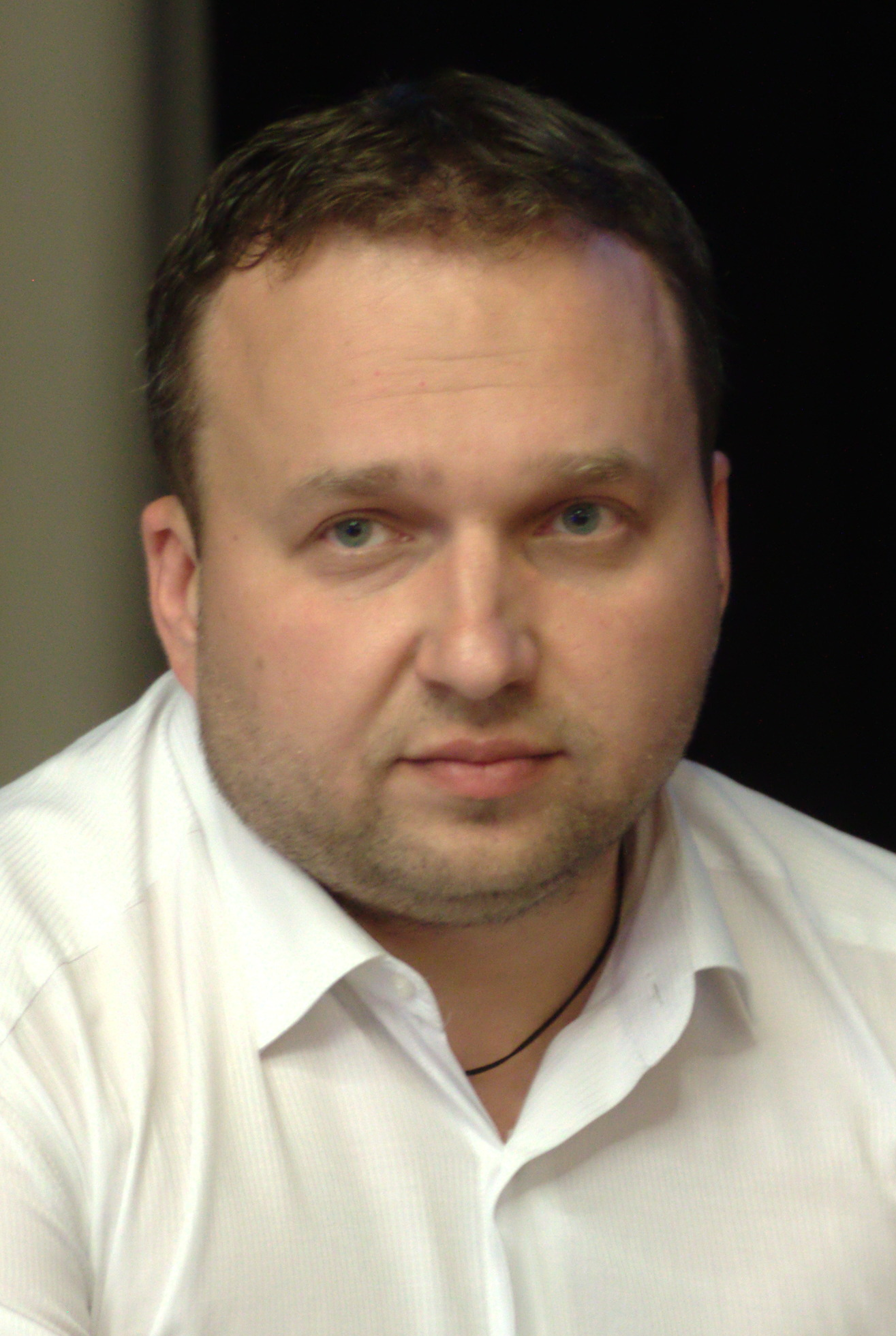

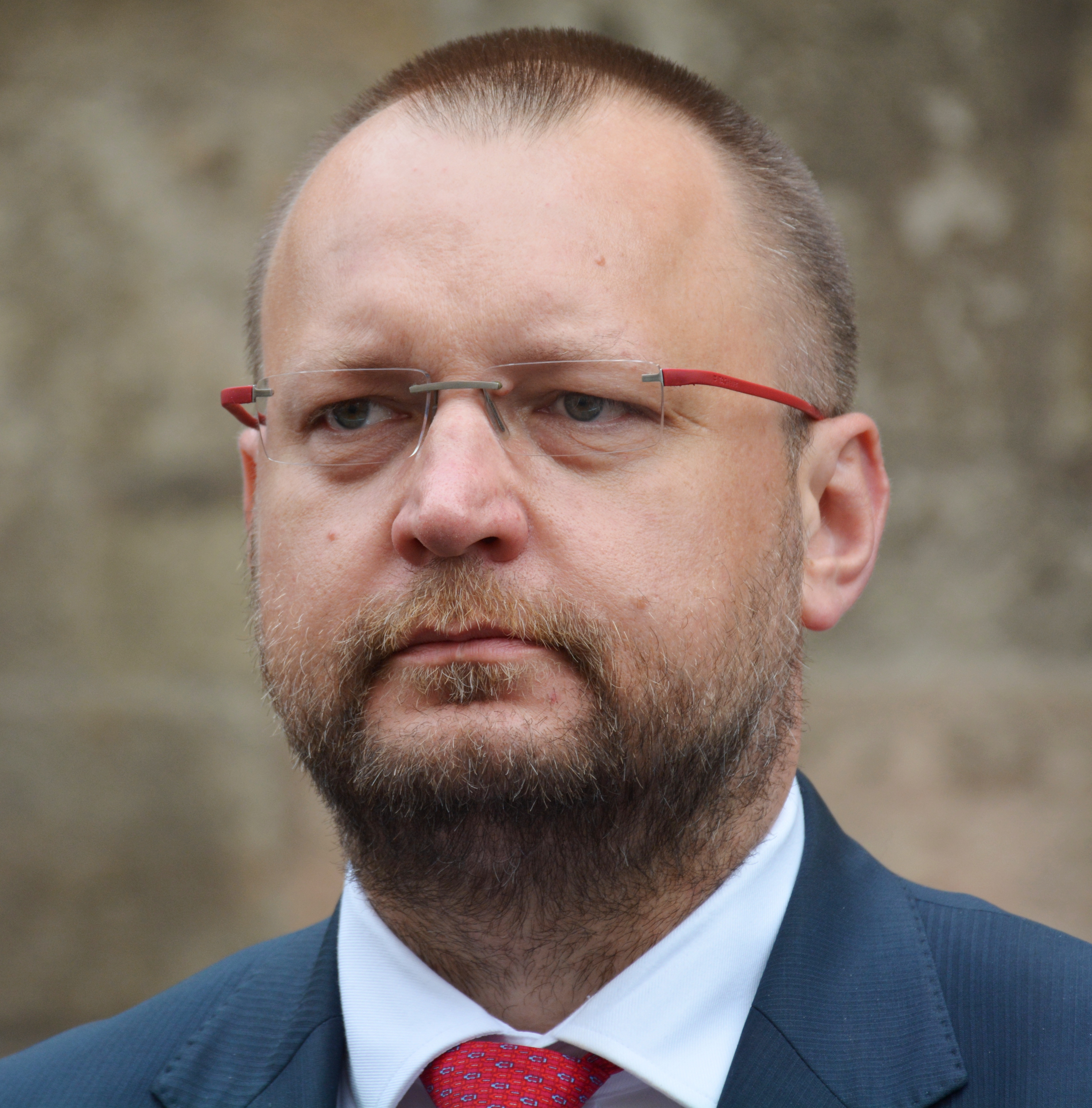

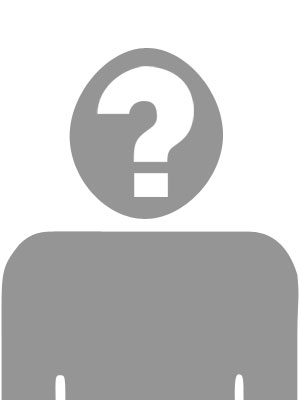
Candidate	Marian Jurečka	Jan Bartošek	Jan Horníček
Electoral vote	205	142	10
Percentage	57.4%	39.8%	2.8%
leader of KDU-ČSL before election
Marek Výborný
Elected leader of KDU-ČSL
Marian Jurečka

A leadership election for KDU-ČSL was held on 25 January 2020 following the resignation of the incumbent leader of the party Marek Výborný. MP Jan Bartošek, MP Marian Jurečka and MEP Tomáš Zdechovský announced were running to replace Výborný. Zdechovský withdrew from the race, and Jurečka then beat Bartošek, receiving 205 votes.

== Background ==
Marek Výborný was elected leader of KDU-ČSL in 2019 when he defeated Marian Jurečka and Jan Bartošek. On 30 September 2019 Výborný's wife died and Výborný became a sole parent of three children. Výborný stated that he will consider his resignation as the leader. On 19 November 2019 Výborný announced that he will resign as the leader of the party.

Speculation about his successor started quickly afterwards. Representatives of regional organisations discussed Výborný's rivals from 2019 election Jan Bartošek and Marian Jurečka. MEP Tomáš Zdechovský and former party leader Pavel Bělobrádek were first to admit they consider candidacy. Governor of Zlín region Jiří Čunek was suggested by part of the party but he declined.

Tomáš Zdechovský announced his candidacy on 2 December 2019. He stated that if he wins then he would resign as an MEP and would lead the party for next Czech legislative election. He also stated that he wants to open the party for people who usually don't vote for KDU-ČSL. Jan Bartošek then announced candidacy on 6 December 2019.

Marian Jurečka announced his candidacy on 8 January 2020. He stated that his plan is getting KDU-ČSL to receive 580,000 votes in next legislative election. He would focus on topics such as decent Housing for young families and seniors.

Leadership debate was held on 17 January 2020. First part of debate was about the direction of KDU-ČSL. All candidates stated they want KDU-ČSL to have stronger support than 6%. Zdechovský stated that party needs new impulse and new face. Jurečka noted that KDU-ČSL has to be readable for voters and should communicate better. Bartošek stated that his first step as a leader would be to meet regional leaders of the party to prepare strategy for regional election. Jurečka stated that he would focus on cheaper housing.

Lidové noviny reported on 24 January 2020 that Jurečka and Bartošek are expected to advance to run off with Jurečka being front runner.

Česká televize held a debate of candidates on 25 January 2020. Candidates agreed that party should be stronger

== Candidates ==
- Jan Bartošek, MP. Bartošek stated that he wanted stronger female and young representation within the party. He wants to focus on ecology, fight against poverty, support of smaller businesses, science and education. He opposes coalition with ANO 2011 and supports cooperation with centre-right opposition.
- Marian Jurečka, MP and former Deputy leader. He announced his candidacy on 8 January 2020. He supports cooperation with centre-left parties.
- Jan Horníček Member of Rychnov assembly.
- Tomáš Zdechovský, MEP. He announced his candidacy on 2 December 2019. He offers more conservative view for the party and wants to focus on economy, transparency and brand building.

=== Declined ===
- Pavel Bělobrádek, former leader admitted to consider candidacy. He ruled out candidacy on 13 December 2019.
- Jiří Čunek, Senator and governor of Zlín region.
- Šárka Jelínková, Deputy leader. She announced that she won't run on 2 January 2020.
- Štěpán Matek leader of Liberec regional organisation.
- Jiří Mihola, MP.

== Voting ==
Election is held on 25 January 2020. It was announced that Štěpán Matek was nominated alongside Bartošek, Jurečka and Zdechovský but declined to run. Zdechovský withdrawn from election on the day. Jan Horníček on the other hand announced his candidacy on 25 January 2020. Bartošek stated during his nomination speech that party should better sell its values and not go in government with criminally prosecuted politician. Jurečka stated that the KDU–ČSL should be more visible and confident. He talked against possible electoral alliance with the Civic Democratic Party or any other opposition party. Horníček stated that party should focus more on Ecology. Jurečka received 205 votes against Bartošek's 142 and became the new leader.

Candidate	Votes	
Marian Jurečka	205	57.42%
Jan Bartošek	142	39.78%
Jan Horníček	10	2.8%
Invalid	19	5.32%
Turnout	357	
