= Všechlapy =

Všechlapy may refer to places in the Czech Republic:

- Všechlapy (Benešov District), a municipality and village in the Central Bohemian Region
- Všechlapy (Nymburk District), a municipality and village in the Central Bohemian Region
- Všechlapy, a village and part of Libčeves in the Ústí nad Labem Region
- Všechlapy, a village and part of Malšice in the South Bohemian Region
- Všechlapy, a village and part of Předslavice in the South Bohemian Region
- Všechlapy, a village and part of Zabrušany in the Ústí nad Labem Region
