= 2013 Christian and Democratic Union – Czechoslovak People's Party leadership election =

Czech political party leadership election

- 8 June 2013
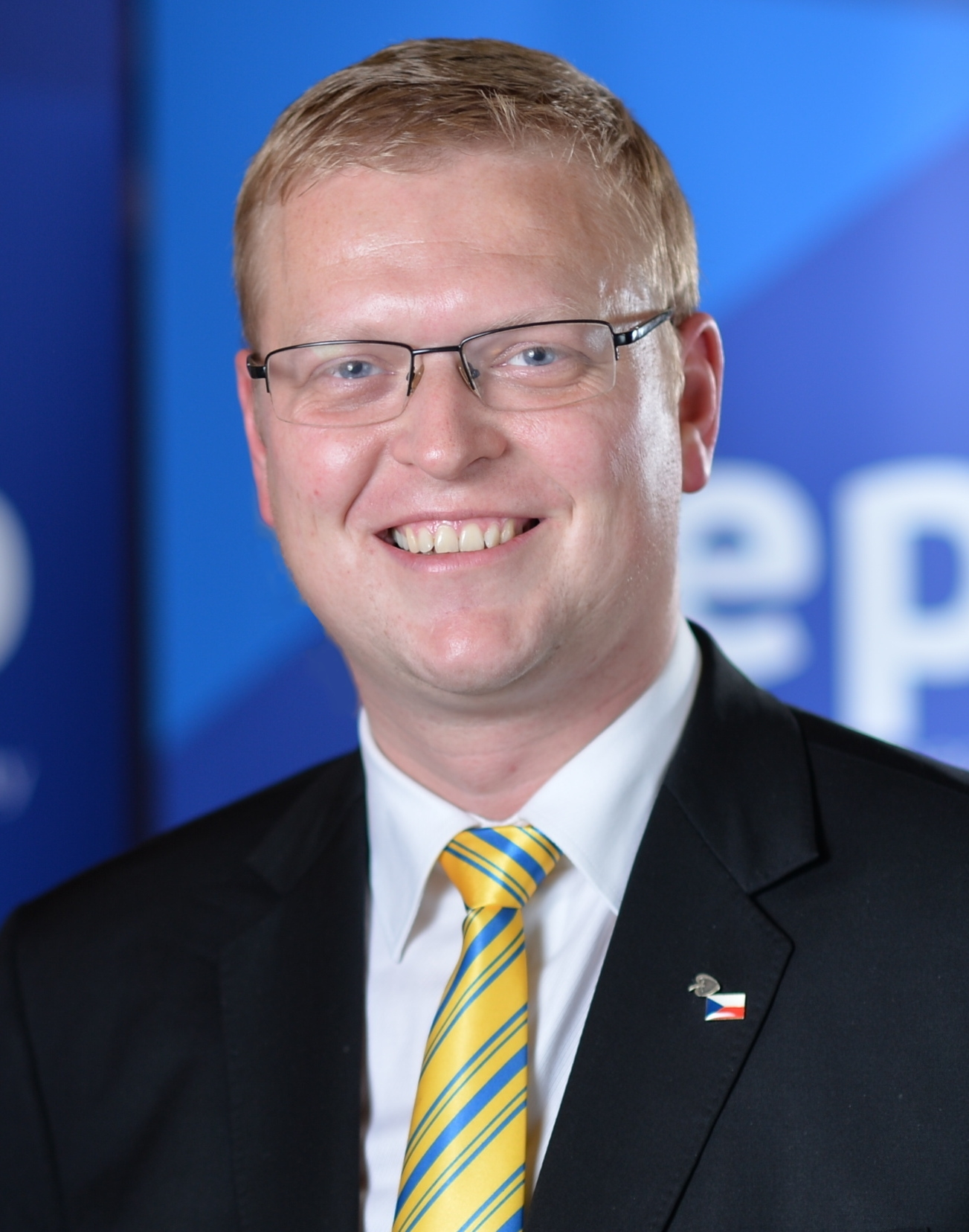
Candidate	Pavel Bělobrádek
Electoral vote	244
Percentage	89,71%
leader of KDU-ČSL before election
Pavel Bělobrádek
Elected leader of KDU-ČSL
Pavel Bělobrádek

A leadership election for Christian and Democratic Union – Czechoslovak People's Party (KDU-ČSL) was held on 8 June 2013. Pavel Bělobrádek was reelected as the leader of KDU-ČSL. Zuzana Roithová and Marian Jurečka were nominated for the position but both of them withdrew from election. Bělobrádek ran unopposed and received 244 of 272 votes.
