= 2017 Christian and Democratic Union – Czechoslovak People's Party leadership election =

Czech political party leadership election

- 27 May 2017
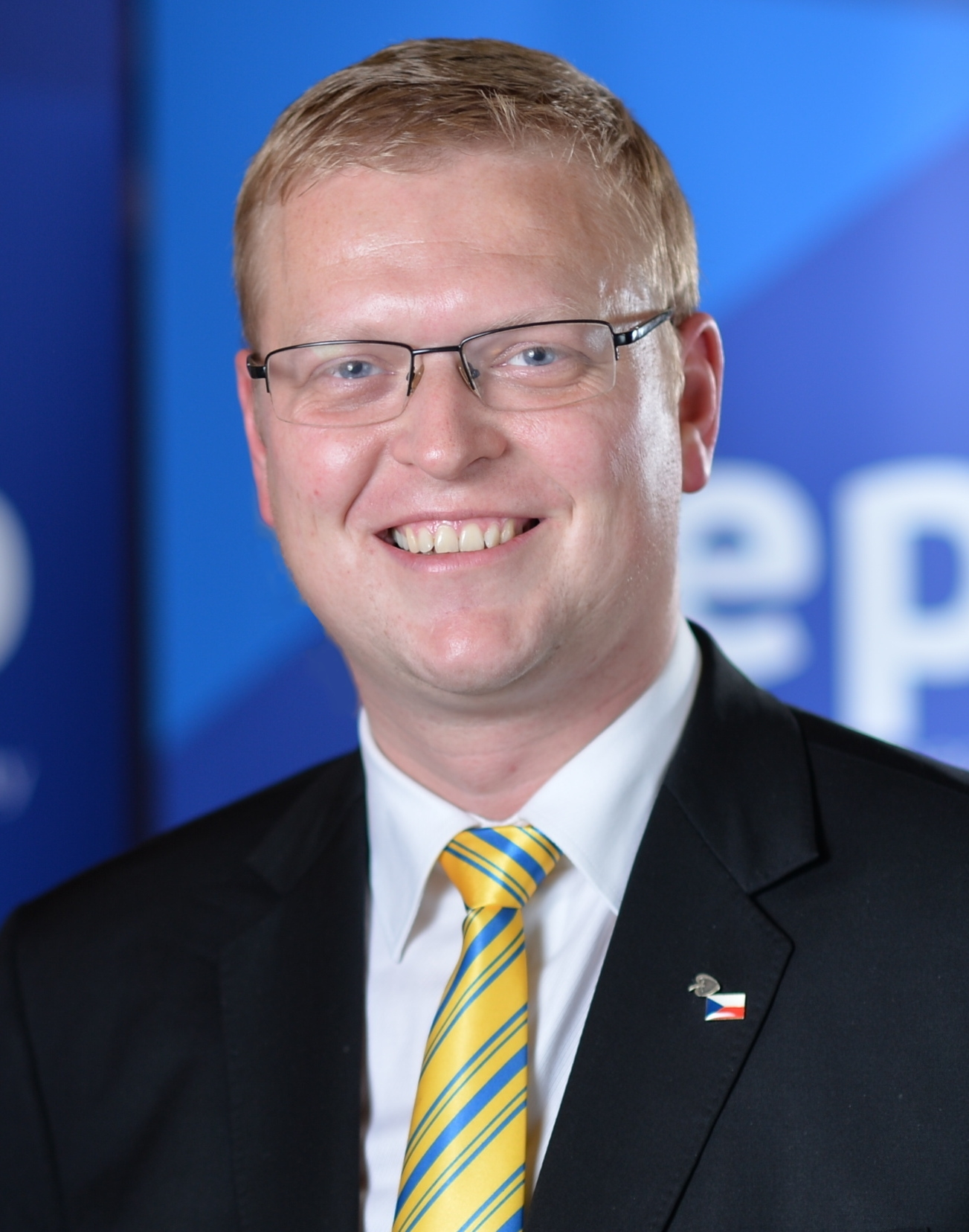

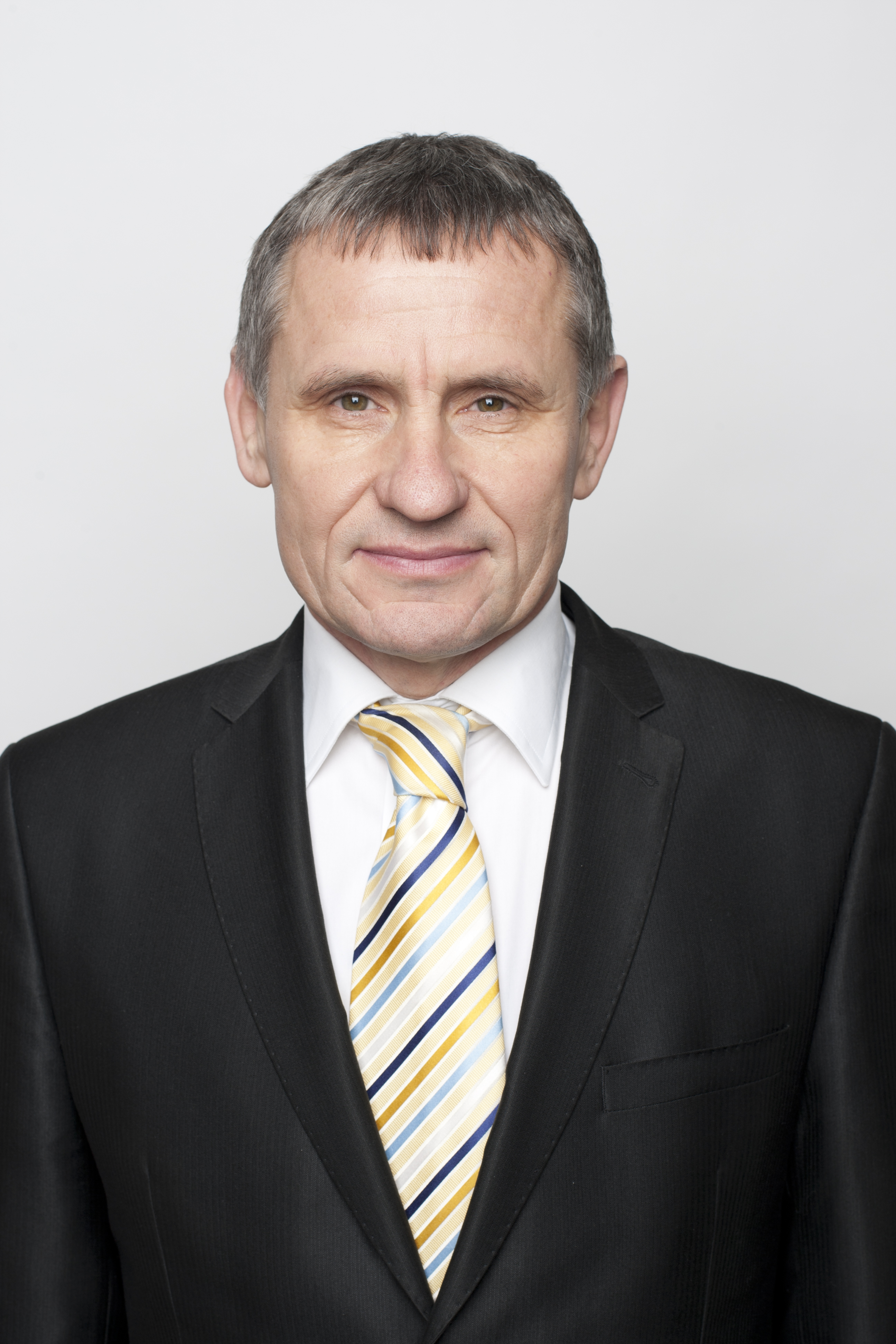
Candidate	Pavel Bělobrádek	Jiří Čunek
Electoral vote	227	43
Percentage	84%	16%
leader of KDU-ČSL before election
Pavel Bělobrádek
Elected leader of KDU-ČSL
Pavel Bělobrádek

A leadership election for Christian and Democratic Union – Czechoslovak People's Party (KDU-ČSL) was held on 27 May 2017. Pavel Bělobrádek was reelected leader of KDU-ČSL. He received 227 votes of 270 delegates. His rival Jiří Čunek received 43 votes. Čunek announced his candidature on the day of the election. His candidature was speculated for months prior the election.
