= 2015 Christian and Democratic Union – Czechoslovak People's Party leadership election =

Czech political party leadership election

- 23 May 2015
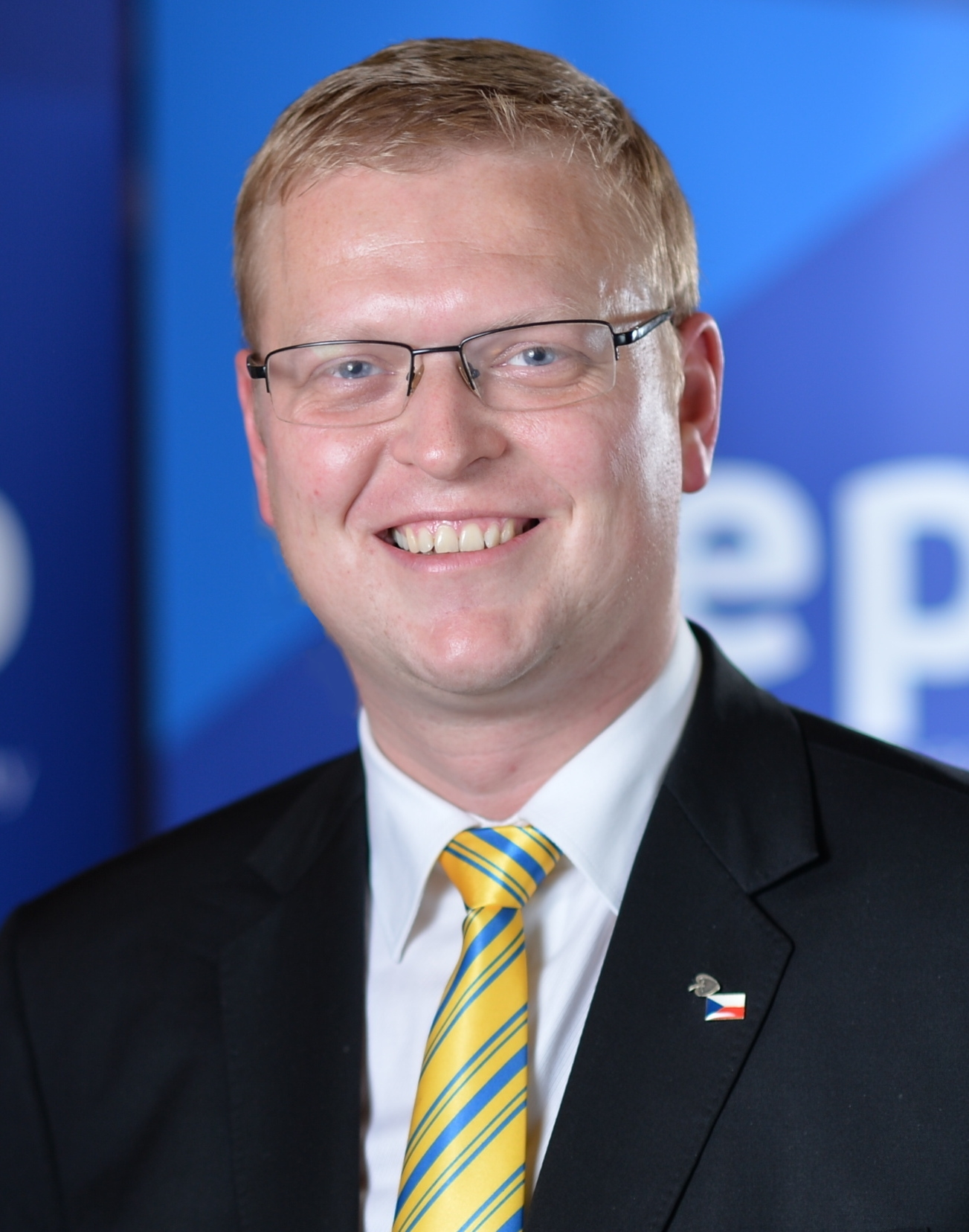
Candidate	Pavel Bělobrádek
Electoral vote	251
Percentage	91,27%
leader of KDU-ČSL before election
Pavel Bělobrádek
Elected leader of KDU-ČSL
Pavel Bělobrádek

A leadership election for Christian and Democratic Union – Czechoslovak People's Party (KDU-ČSL) was held on 28 May 2015. Incumbent Pavel Bělobrádek was re-elected when he received votes of 251 delegates (of 275).

Belobrádek had no competition in the race. Party's Vice-chairman Marian Jurečka was speculated to run against Bělobrádek, but he decided to not take part in the election. He said that he doesn't want to split the party.
