= Miloslav Rozner =

Czech politician and businessman

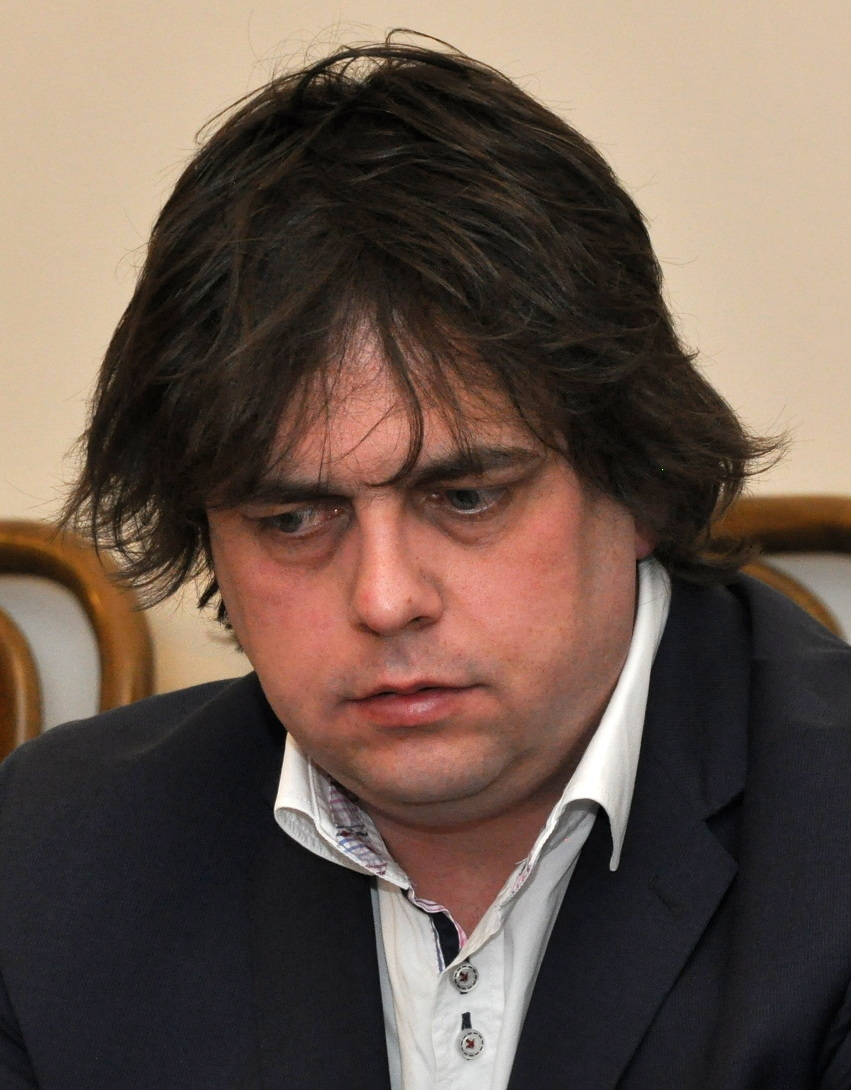

Member of the Chamber of Deputies
- In office 21 October 2017 – 21 October 2021

Personal details
- Born: March 29, 1977 (age 49) České Budějovice, Czechoslovakia (now Czech Republic)
- Party: SPD

Miloslav Rozner (born 29 March 1977) is a Czech politician and businessman who was a member of the Chamber of Deputies from October 2017 to October 2021. In April 2022, he was convicted for genocide denial and sentenced to a six-month suspended prison sentence.

== Early career ==
Rozner has previously worked in a bakery and in a gas station. He went into business related to culture during the 1990s. Between 1996 and 2012 he organised 887 cultural events.

== Political career ==
=== Debate performances ===
Rozner joined Freedom and Direct Democracy and became the party's spokesperson on culture, and lead candidate in South Bohemia for the 2017 legislative election. He participated in a debate held by Czech Television, where his performance was received negatively and met with mockery. He was visibly unprepared and seemed to be confused, had a problem forming a coherent sentence, wasn't paying attention to questions or what other debaters said and had problems responding. He answered most of the questions by reading prepared statements. His answer to one of the questions that received much attention was "Sure, maybe like I don't exactly agree with you."

Several quotations from Rozner from the debates went viral, and Rozner became a celebrity on social media, and the target of memes and jokes. A satirical Facebook page, Miloslav Rozner - Minister of Culture, was created soon afterwards and attracted thousands of likes within a matter of days. A satirical website called Minister of Culture was launched at the end of October 2017, celebrating some quotes by Rozner and hosting recordings of Rozner's answers.

He was eventually elected as a member of the Chamber of Deputies.

=== Parliamentary career ===
After his election, Rozner continued to receive a lot of attention from the media. Asked about his party's post-election strategy, he answered "I do not want to get in the middle of that, so I do not have to worry about getting out of it and saying something wrong. I do not want to influence anything, I'll see what Tomio negotiates for us".

On 22 November 2017, Rozner became a member of the Mandate and Immunity Committee.

In April 2022, Rozner was sentenced to a six-month suspended prison sentence for the crime of genocide denial, for his statements questioning the existence of the Lety concentration camp. The sentence is final.
