= Radek Koten =

Czech politician

Radek Koten MP

Member of the Chamber of Deputies
- Incumbent
- Assumed office 21 October 2017

Personal details
- Born: 18 February 1965 (age 61) Czechoslovakia
- Party: SPD (2016–)

Radek Koten (born 2 March 1965) is a Czech politician and businessman who serves an MP in the Chamber of Deputies for the Freedom and Direct Democracy (SPD) party.

Koten was a soldier and a member of the Border Guard (Pohraniční stráž) in the 1980s who were tasked with guarding the Iron Curtain on the Czechoslovak border. After the end of communism in the Czech Republic, he became a business owner and later the managing director of a wireless and cable networks laying company based in Prague.

In the 2017 Czech legislative election, Koten was elected to the Chamber of Deputies for the SPD on the Vysočina Region constituency list. After his election, he was nominated to serve on the parliamentary defense committee. This became a source of some controversy due to Koten's support for the Czech Republic leaving the European Union and because he was a member of various Facebook groups that posted links to conspiracy theory websites. Koten denied that he had intentionally added himself to the groups.
