= Karla Maříková =

Czech politician

Member of the Chamber of Deputies
- In office 21 October 2017 – 8 October 2025

Personal details
- Born: 19 February 1981 (age 45) Ostrov, Czechoslovakia
- Party: SPD (since 2016)

Karla Maříková (born 19 March 1981) is a Czech politician and former member of the Chamber of Deputies for Freedom and Direct Democracy (SPD) from 2017 to 2025.

Maříková graduated from a medical college in Karlovy Vary and worked as a nurse. In the 2017 elections, she was elected to parliament as the lead candidate for SPD in the Karlovy Vary Region. Since 2018, she has also been a municipal councilor in Ostrov.
