= Šárka Jelínková =

Czech politician

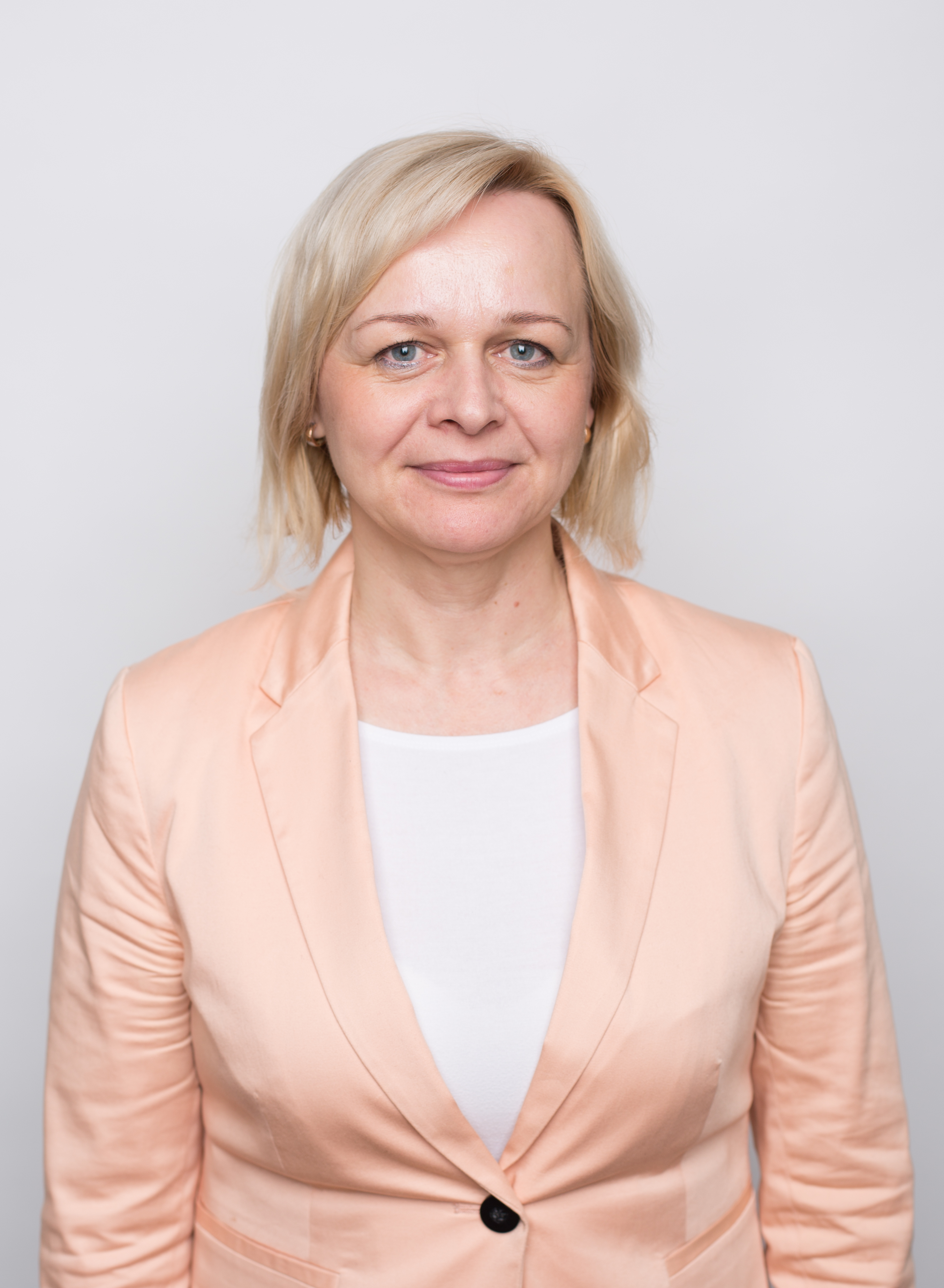

Senator from Kroměříž
- In office 15 October 2016 – 15 October 2022
- Preceded by: Miloš Malý
- Succeeded by: Jana Zwyrtek Hamplová

1st Vice-Chairman of KDU-ČSL
- In office 29 March 2019 – 23 April 2022
- Preceded by: Marian Jurečka
- Succeeded by: Jan Bartošek

Personal details
- Born: 24 January 1968 (age 58) Bystřice pod Hostýnem, Czechoslovakia (now Czech Republic)
- Party: KDU–ČSL
- Education: Palacký University Olomouc

Šárka Jelínková (born 24 January 1968) is a Czech politician and social worker who had been Senator from Kroměříž from October 2016 to October 2022. In 2019 Christian and Democratic Union – Czechoslovak People's Party leadership election she was elected as deputy chairwoman of the KDU-ČSL.

Since September 2011 she is director of the Centre for Seniors Garden in Bystřice pod Hostýnem.
