= Štěpán Matek =

Czech politician

Deputy Chairman of KDU–ČSL
- In office 29 March 2019 – 25 January 2020

Personal details
- Born: 14 May 1987 (age 39) Jablonec nad Nisou, Czechoslovakia (now Czech Republic)
- Party: KDU–ČSL
- Education: Technical University of Liberec

Štěpán Matek (born 14 May 1987) is a Czech politician and former deputy chairman of the Christian and Democratic Union – Czechoslovak People's Party (KDU-ČSL).

In 2016–2018 he worked as sales manager in Jablotron Company. In 2018 he was elected deputy mayor of Jablonec nad Nisou. In 2019 he was elected as deputy leader in 2019 Christian and Democratic Union – Czechoslovak People's Party leadership election.
