= Radek Rozvoral =

Czech politician

Member of the Chamber of Deputies
- In office 21 October 2017 – 8 October 2025

Personal details
- Born: 28 July 1967 (age 59) Nymburk, Czech Republic
- Party: Dawn of Direct Democracy (2013–2017); Freedom and Direct Democracy (2015–present)

Radek Rozvoral (born 28 June 1967) is a Czech politician who served as a member of the Chamber of Deputies for the Freedom and Direct Democracy party from 2017 to 2025. Since 2014, he has also been the deputy mayor of Všechlapy.

In the Czech municipal elections in 2006, Rozvoral was elected as an independent candidate to the municipality of Všechlapy. He was re-elected as a municipal representative in the 2010 and 2014 elections as an independent candidate and became deputy mayor in 2014. In the 2018 elections, he was re-elected as a municipal representative but as a member of the Freedom and Direct Democracy (SPD) and kept his position as deputy mayor.

In 2013, he became a member of Dawn of Direct Democracy and unsuccessfully stood for the party during the 2013 Czech parliamentary election for the Central Bohemia region. In 2017, he stood for the Freedom and Direct Democracy and was elected as an MP in the Chamber of Deputies for the Central Bohemia constituency. He has also been the SPD leader in Central Bohemia and a member of the SPD's executive board since 2015.
