= Jana Fischerová =

Czech politician

Jana Fischerová MP
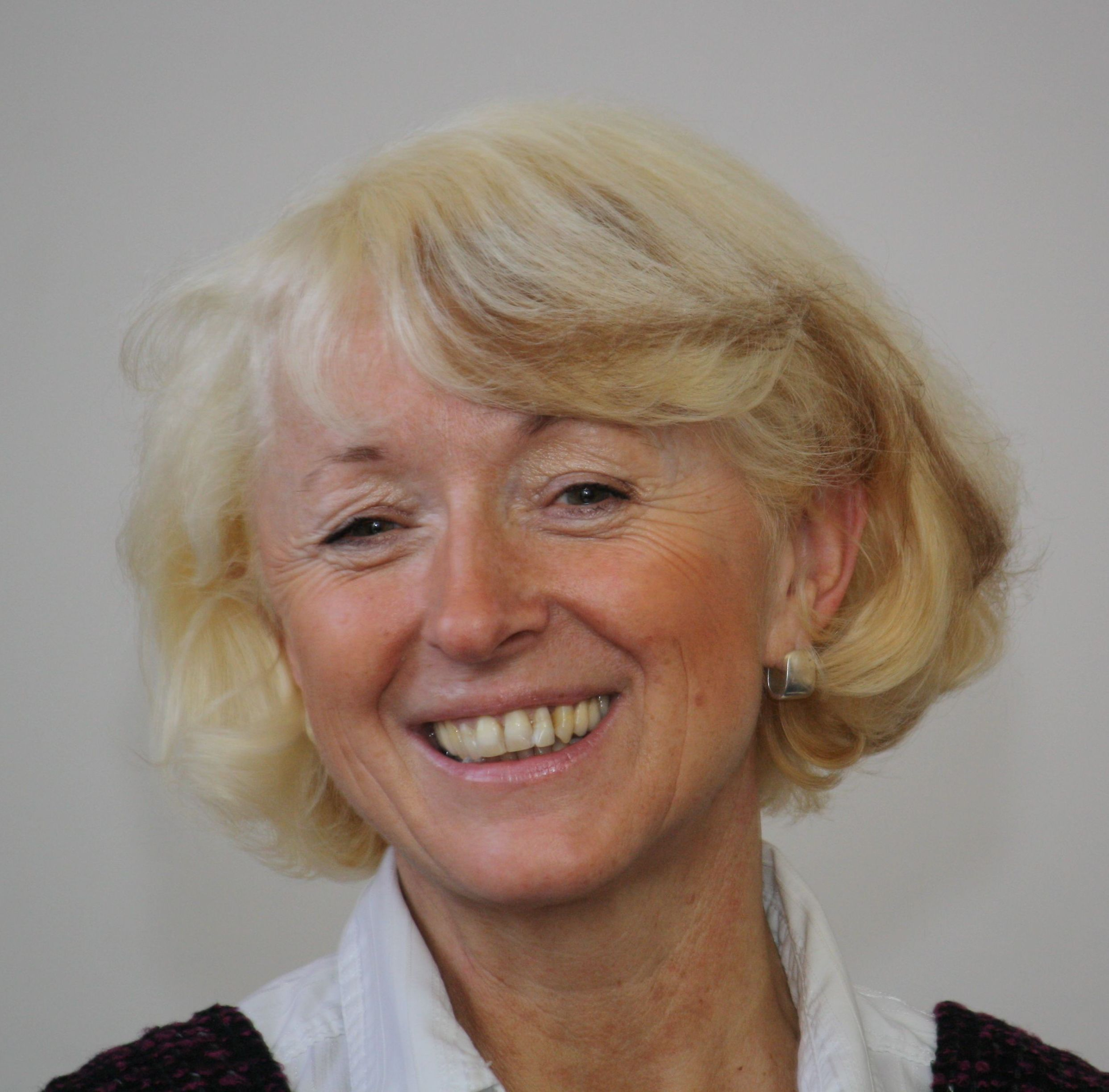

Member of the Chamber of Deputies
- In office 29 May 2010 – 28 August 2013
- In office 26 October 2013 – 26 October 2017

Mayor of Havlíčkův Brod
- In office 2006–2010

Personal details
- Born: Jana Pajskrová; August 20, 1955 (age 70) Havlíčkův Brod, Czechoslovakia

Jana Fischerová (born 20 August 1955) is a Czech politician who served in the Chamber of Deputies from 2010 to 2017.

Fischerová was born in 1955 in Havlíčkův Brod. She studied civil engineering at the Czech Technical University in Prague, earning her CSc. degree in 1986.

From 2006 to 2010, Fischerová served as the mayor of Havlíčkův Brod. In the 2010 Czech legislative elections, she was elected to the Chamber of Deputies as a member of the Civic Democratic Party (ODS). She was reelected in the 2013 elections. During her second term she was vice-chair of the Committee on Foreign Affairs.

In addition to her involvement in national politics, Fischerová was a representative to the Parliamentary Assembly of the Council of Europe from 2010 to 2014 and was a substitute representative from 2015 to 2017.
