= Zuzka Bebarová-Rujbrová =

Czech politician

Zuzka Bebarová-Rujbrová MP
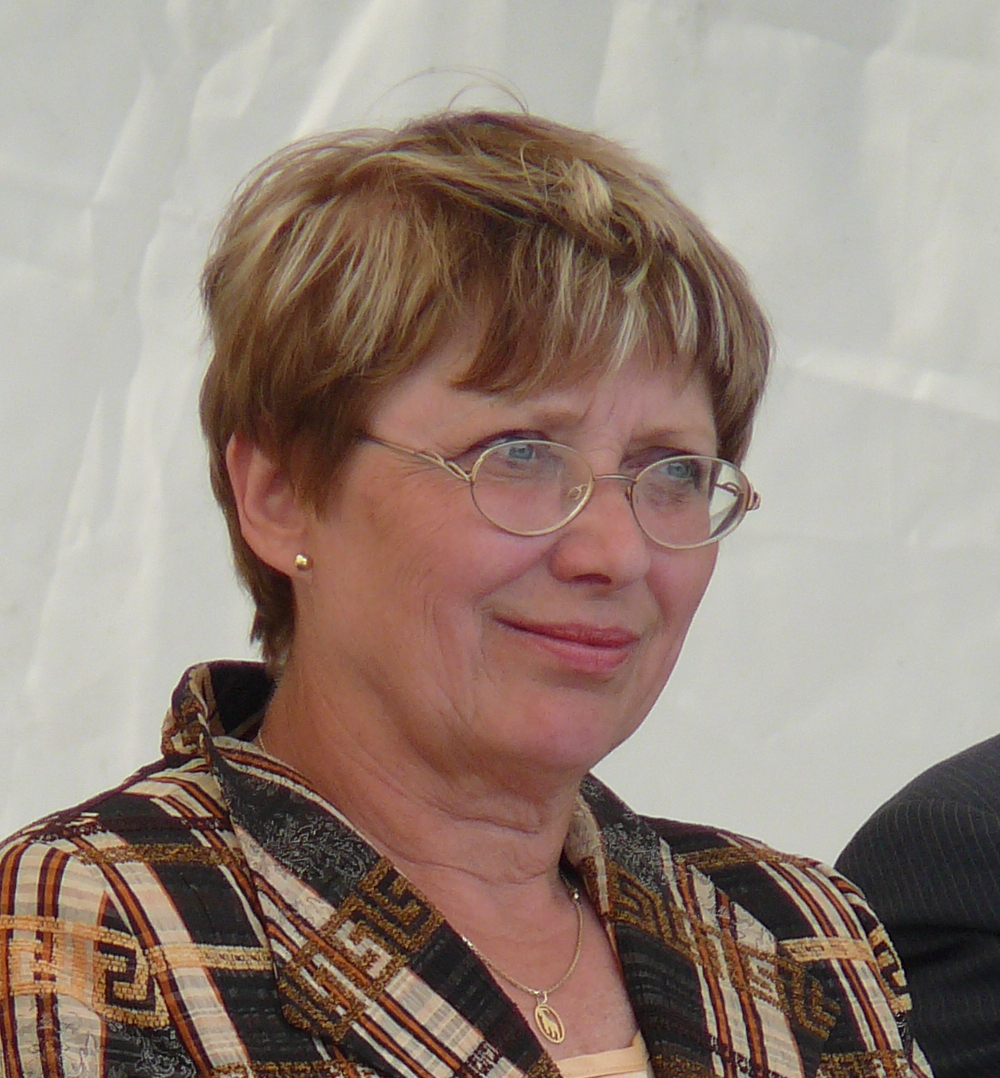

Member of Parliament for South Moravian Region
- In office 1 June 1996 – 26 October 2017

Personal details
- Born: 13 January 1951 (age 75) Jičín, Czechoslovakia
- Party: Communist Party of Bohemia and Moravia

Zuzka Bebarová-Rujbrová (born 13 January 1951) is a Czech politician. She was a member of the Chamber of Deputies of the Czech Republic from 1996 to 2017, representing South Moravian Region for the Communist Party of Bohemia and Moravia

== Career ==
She has served as a member of Committee on Petitions since 4 December 2013, and chair since 6 December. She also serves as a Member of the Committee on Security.
