= Radovan Vích =

Czech politician

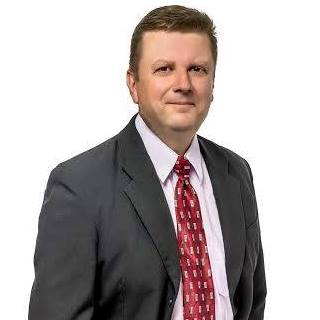
- Radovan Vích in 2016

Member of the Chamber of Deputies
- In office 21 October 2017 – 8 October 2025

Personal details
- Born: 25 December 1964 (age 61) Liberec, Czech Republic
- Party: KSČ; Freedom and Direct Democracy (2015–present)
- Education: University of Defence

Radovan Vích (born 25 December 1964) is a Czech politician and former member of the Chamber of Deputies for the Freedom and Direct Democracy party from 2017 to 2025.

Vích graduated from the University of Defence in Brno and worked as an engineer in the Czech army and has been an army reservist since 2010. In 2015, he became a founding member of the Freedom and Direct Democracy (SPD) in Liberec and became the party spokesman on matters related to defense. In the 2017 Czech parliamentary election, he was elected to the Chamber of Deputies for the Liberec region.
