= Předslavice =

- Municipality
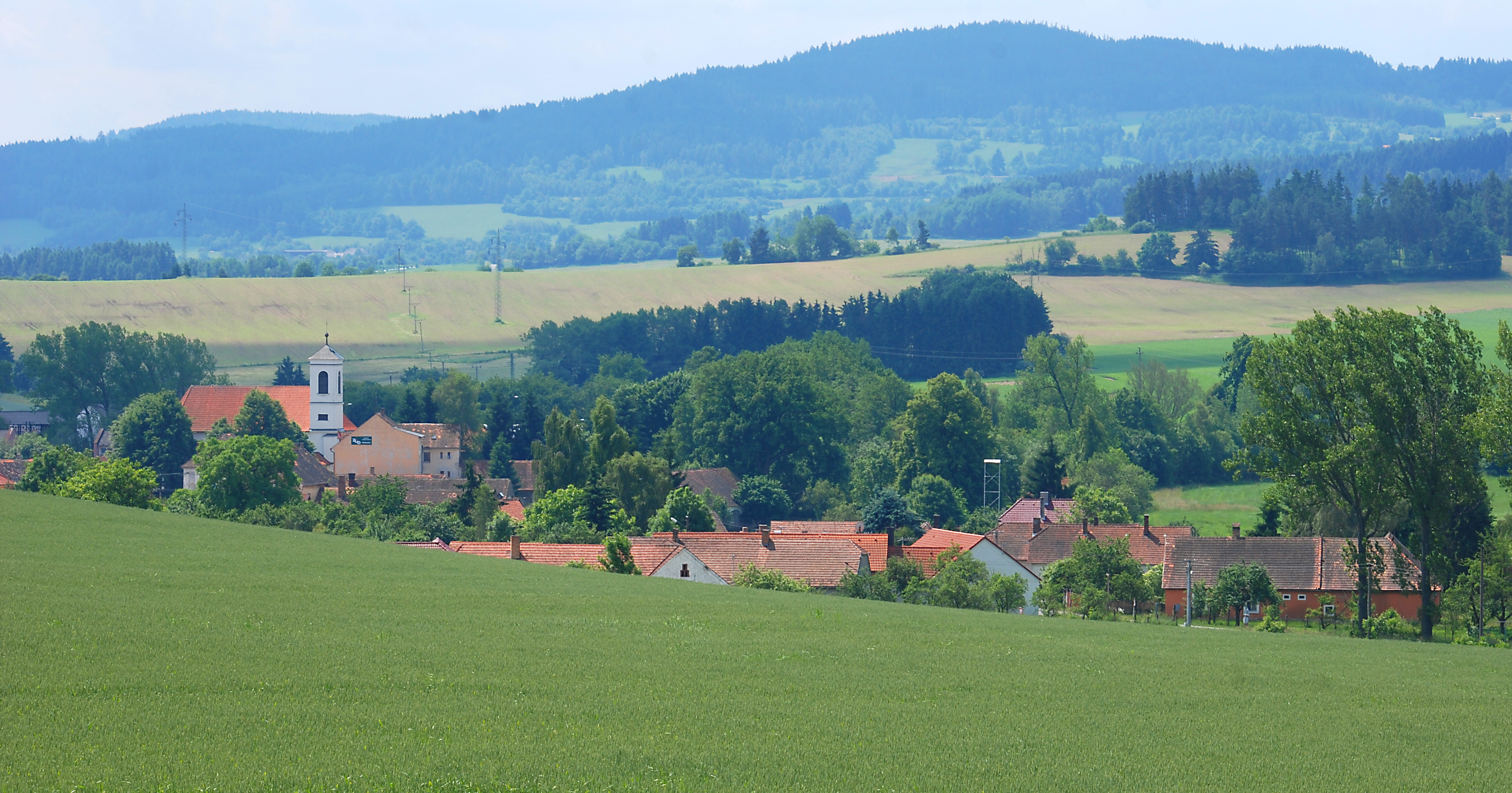
- View of Předslavice

- Location in the Czech Republic
- Coordinates: 49°7′56″N 13°56′6″E
- Country: Czech Republic
- Region: South Bohemian
- District: Strakonice
- First mentioned: 1352

Area
  - Total: 11.57 km^{2} (4.47 sq mi)
- Elevation: 528 m (1,732 ft)

Population (2026-01-01)
  - Total: 235
  - Density: 20.3/km^{2} (52.6/sq mi)
- Time zone: UTC+1 (CET)
  - Summer (DST): UTC+2 (CEST)
- Postal code: 387 01
- Website: www.predslavice.cz

Předslavice is a municipality and village in Strakonice District in the South Bohemian Region of the Czech Republic. It has about 200 inhabitants.

== Administrative division ==
Předslavice consists of five municipal parts (in brackets population according to the 2021 census):

- Předslavice (94)
- Kakovice (26)
- Marčovice (28)
- Úlehle (63)
- Všechlapy (49)

== Geography ==
Předslavice is located about 14 kilometres (9 mi) south of Strakonice and 42 km (26 mi) northwest of České Budějovice. It lies in a hilly landscape of the Bohemian Forest Foothills. The highest point is the hill Bořkův kopec at 636 m (2,087 ft) above sea level.

== Demographics ==
Historical population
Year	Pop.	±%
1869	759	—
1880	809	+6.6%
1890	760	−6.1%
1900	781	+2.8%
1910	729	−6.7%
1921	744	+2.1%
1930	742	−0.3%
1950	499	−32.7%
1961	490	−1.8%
1970	430	−12.2%
1980	356	−17.2%
1991	265	−25.6%
2001	239	−9.8%
2011	254	+6.3%
2021	260	+2.4%
Source: Censuses
