= Robert Králíček =

Czech politician (born 1977)

Member of the Chamber of Deputies
- Incumbent
- Assumed office 21 October 2017
- Constituency: Prague

Personal details
- Born: 11 February 1977 (age 49) Pardubice, Czechoslovakia
- Party: ANO (since 2014)

Robert Králíček (born 11 February 1977) is a Czech politician serving as a member of the Chamber of Deputies since 2017. He has served as deputy leader of ANO since 2024.
