= 2019 Christian and Democratic Union – Czechoslovak People's Party leadership election =

Czech political party leadership election

- 29 March 2019
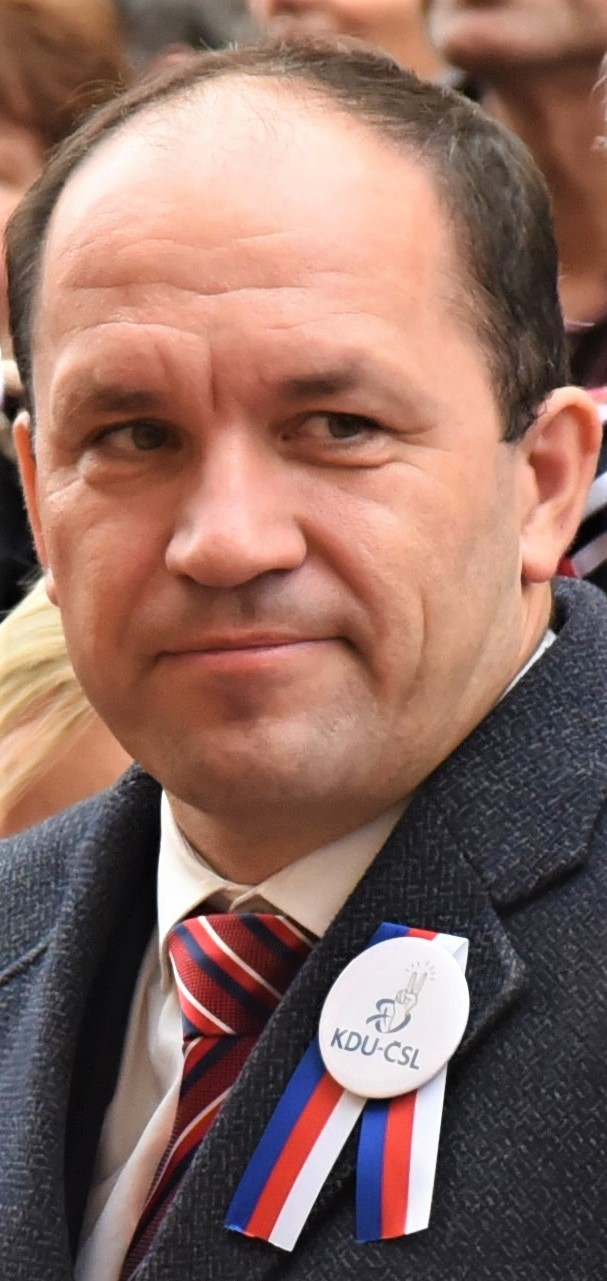

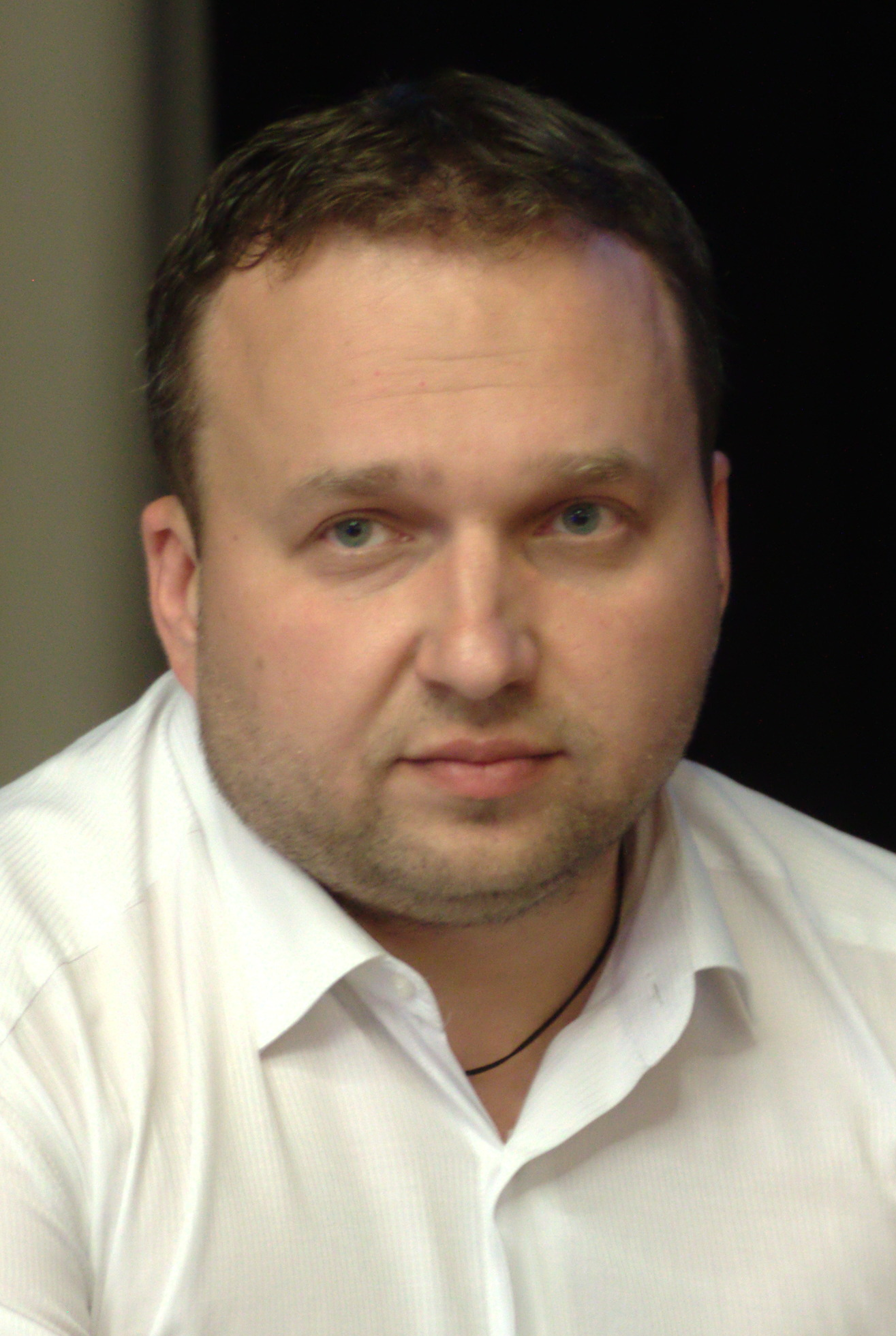
Candidate	Marek Výborný	Marian Jurečka
Electoral vote	256	124
Percentage	67%	33%
leader of KDU-ČSL before election
Pavel Bělobrádek
Elected leader of KDU-ČSL
Marek Výborný

A leadership election for Christian and Democratic Union – Czechoslovak People's Party (KDU-ČSL) was held on 29 March 2019.

== Candidates ==
- Jan Bartošek, leader of party's MPs didn't rule out candidacy. He announced his candidacy on 22 October 2018.
- Marian Jurečka, the Deputy leader of the party announced his intention to run on 23 September 2018. He officially announced his candidacy on 27 November 2018.
- Jaroslav Vlach, announced his candidacy on 29 March 2019.
- Marek Výborný, MP. His candidacy was suggested by some prominent members of the party. He himself admitted interest in candidacy. He announced his candidacy on 6 November 2018.

=== Declined ===
- Pavel Bělobrádek, the incumbent leader of KDU-ČSL stated he will decide whether he runs for another term after 2018 local and senate elections.
- Jiří Čunek, Senator and former leader. After his success in 2018 Senate election he stated that he thinks about candidacy. He decided to not run. He announced his decision on 18 February 2019.

== Campaign ==
Christian Democrats decided to hold a series of debates to help decide who will become the new leader. The first debate was held on 25 February 2019. Bartošek, Jurečka and Výborný participated. All candidates agreed that it was a good choice to not join government coalition led by ANO 2011.

South Bohemian KDU-ČSL held conference on 9 March 2019 and gave its nomination to Bartošek. Jurečka on the other hand received nomination from Olomouc regional organisation.

== Result ==
Two candidates advanced form 1st round of voting. Výborný received 176 votes and Jurečka 118 votes. In the second round, Výborný received 256 votes and Jurečka 124 votes, with Výborný elected as the new leader.

== Voting ==
Candidate	1st Round	2nd Round
Marek Výborný	176	256
Marian Jurečka	118	124
Jan Bartošek	78	
Jaroslav Vlach	10	
Turnout		
