= Vít Kaňkovský =

Czech politician

Vít Kaňkovský MP
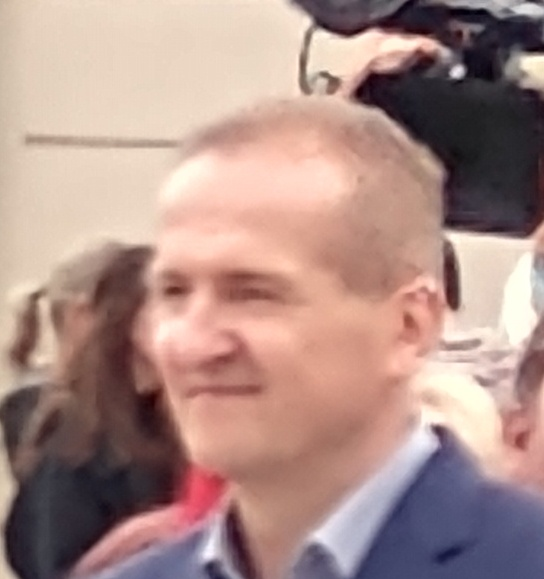

Member of the Chamber of Deputies
- In office 26 October 2013 – 8 October 2025

Deputy of Vysočina Region
- In office 13 October 2012 – 16 February 2026

Deputy of Třešť
- Incumbent
- Assumed office 14 November 1998

Personal details
- Born: 5 February 1970 (age 56) Brno, Czechoslovakia (now Czech Republic)
- Party: KDU–ČSL
- Spouse: Magdalena Kaňkovská
- Children: 4
- Education: Masaryk University

Vít Kaňkovský (born 5 February 1970) is a Czech politician and physician. He was of the Chamber of Deputies for the Christian and Democratic Union – Czechoslovak People's Party (KDU-ČSL) from October 2013 to October 2025. He was also Deputy of the Vysočina Region and longterm Deputy of the Třešť municipality.
