= Všechlapy (Nymburk District) =

- Municipality
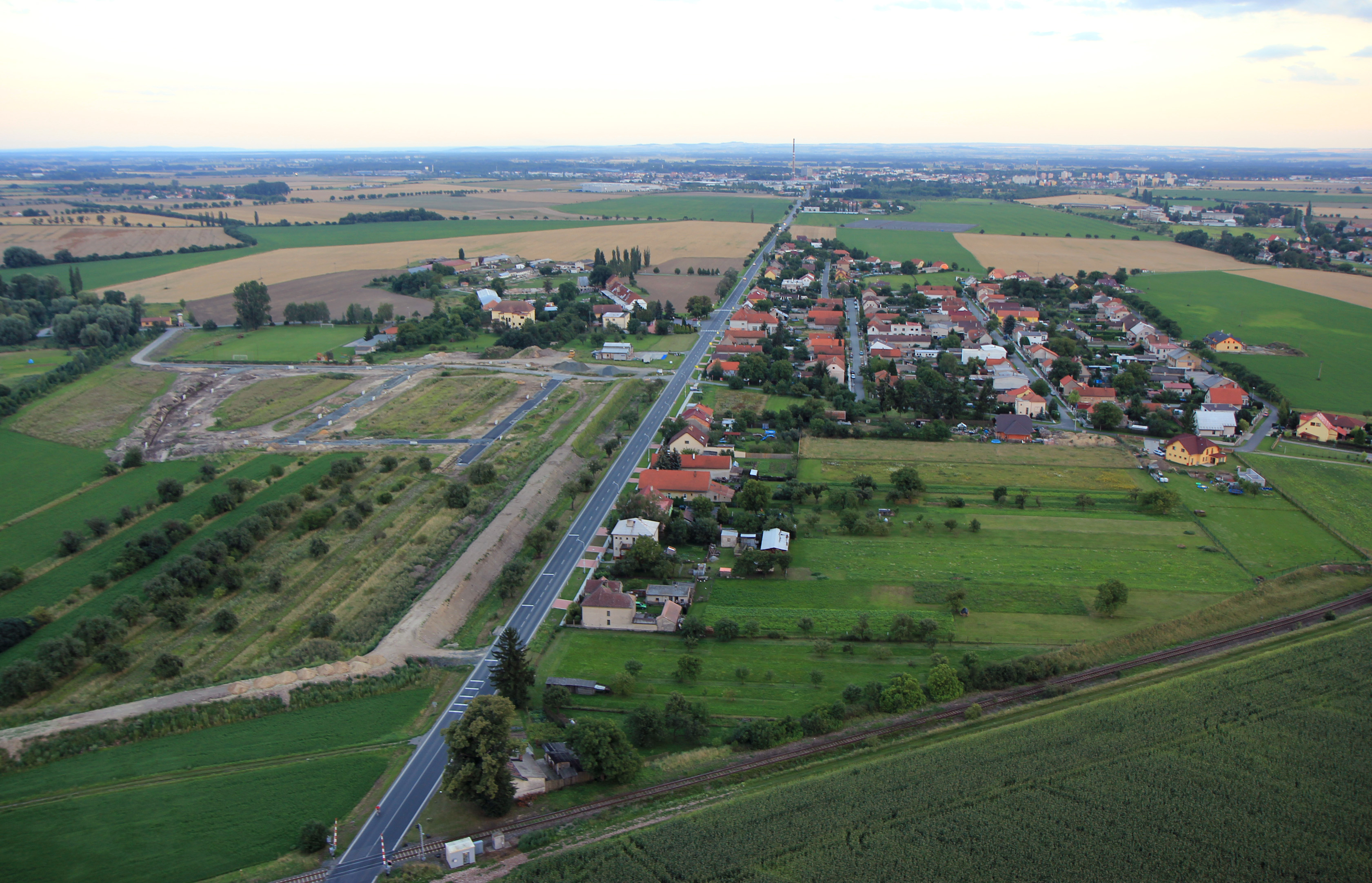
- Aerial view

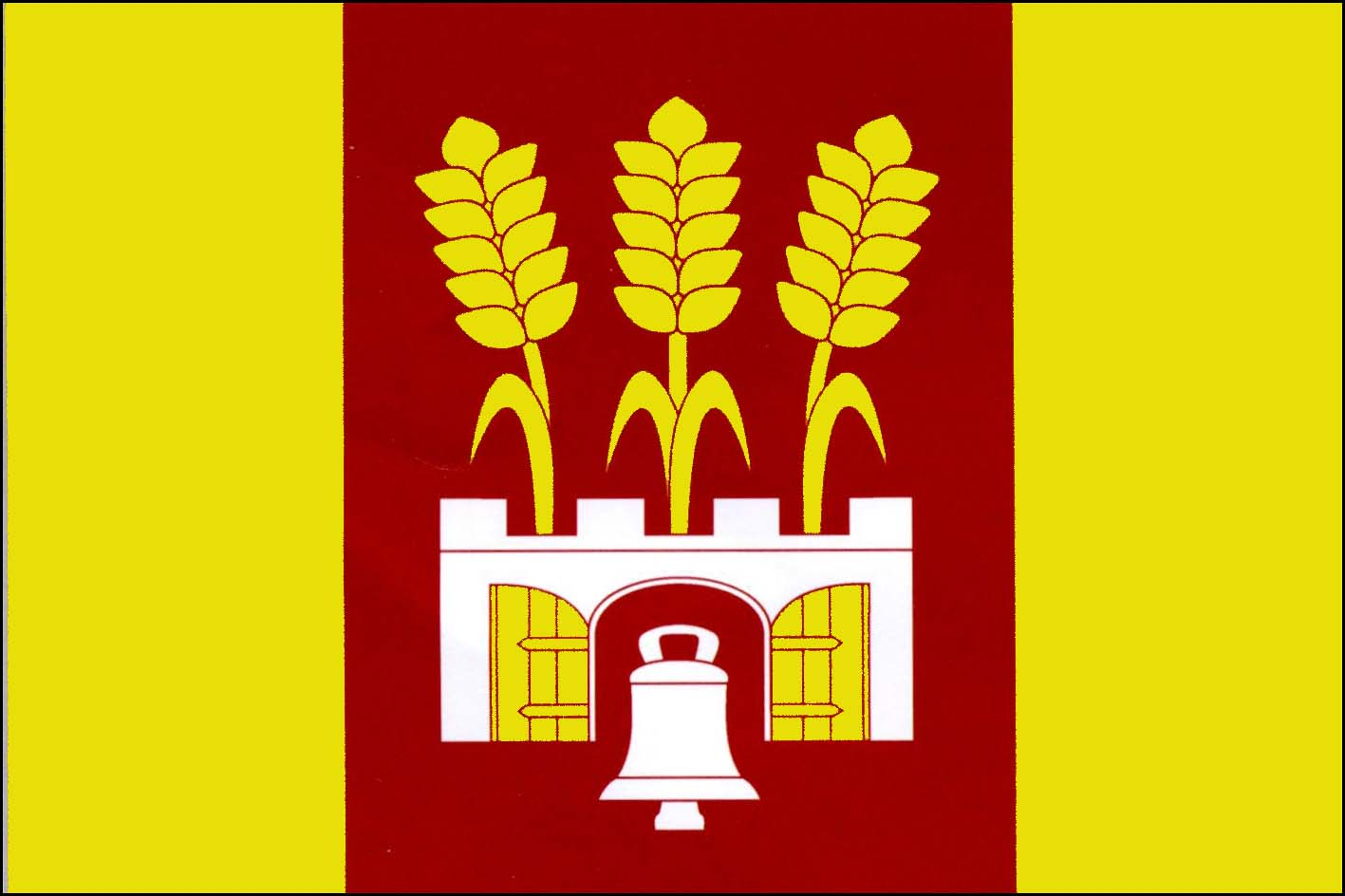
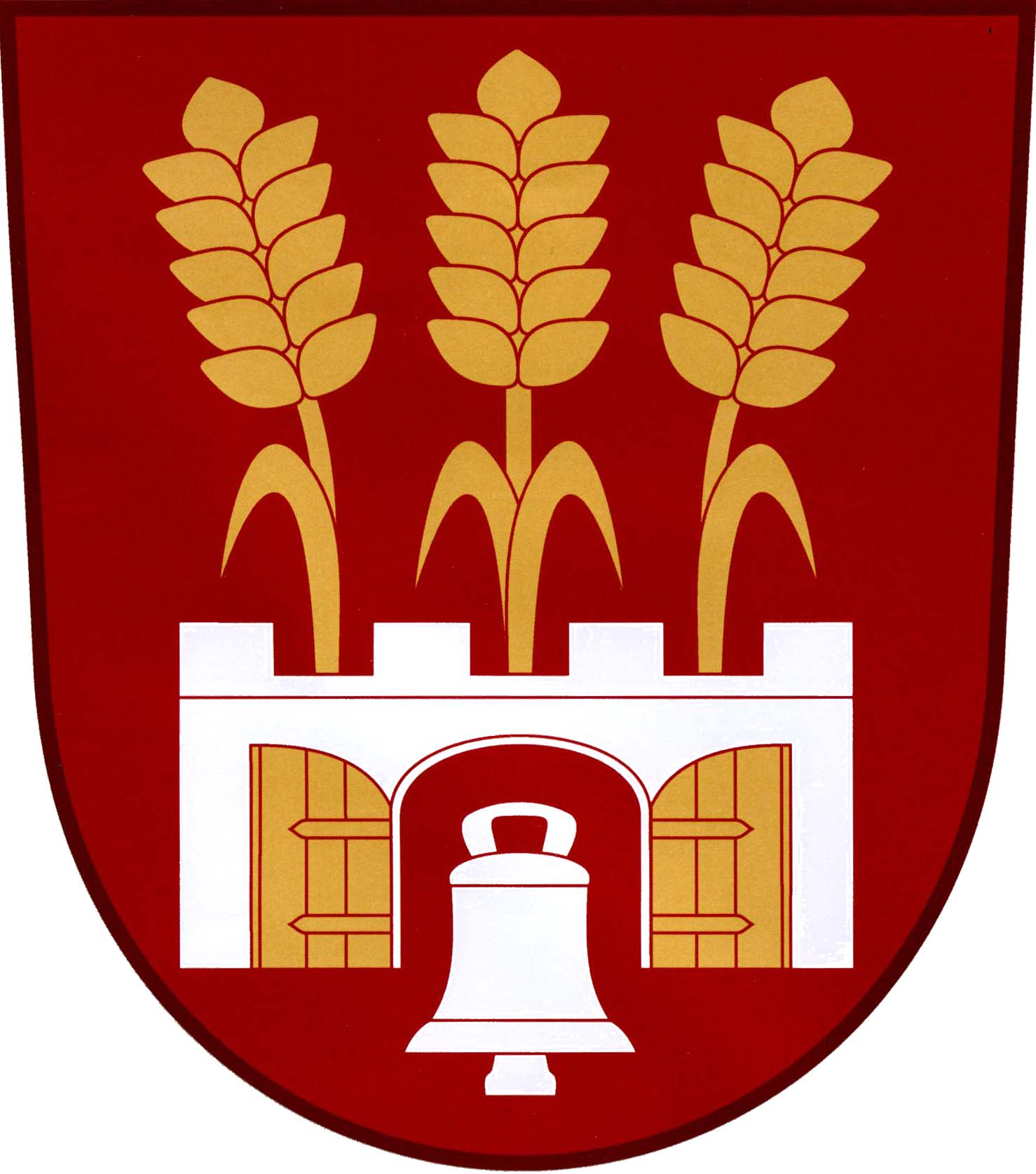
- Flag Coat of arms

- Location in the Czech Republic
- Coordinates: 50°13′16″N 15°1′43″E
- Country: Czech Republic
- Region: Central Bohemian
- District: Nymburk
- First mentioned: 1223

Area
  - Total: 3.04 km^{2} (1.17 sq mi)
- Elevation: 194 m (636 ft)

Population (2026-01-01)
  - Total: 833
  - Density: 274/km^{2} (710/sq mi)
- Time zone: UTC+1 (CET)
  - Summer (DST): UTC+2 (CEST)
- Postal code: 288 02
- Website: www.vsechlapy.cz

Všechlapy is a municipality and village in Nymburk District in the Central Bohemian Region of the Czech Republic. It has about 800 inhabitants.

== Etymology ==
The name was derived from the Czech word vše ('all') and the old Czech word chlapi ('commoners', 'peasants').

== Demographics ==
Historical population
Year	Pop.	±%
1869	293	—
1880	343	+17.1%
1890	356	+3.8%
1900	352	−1.1%
1910	353	+0.3%
1921	439	+24.4%
1930	616	+40.3%
1950	607	−1.5%
1961	655	+7.9%
1970	605	−7.6%
1980	572	−5.5%
1991	535	−6.5%
2001	560	+4.7%
2011	657	+17.3%
2021	801	+21.9%
Source: Censuses
