= Radim Fiala =

Czech politician and businessman

Radim Fiala MP
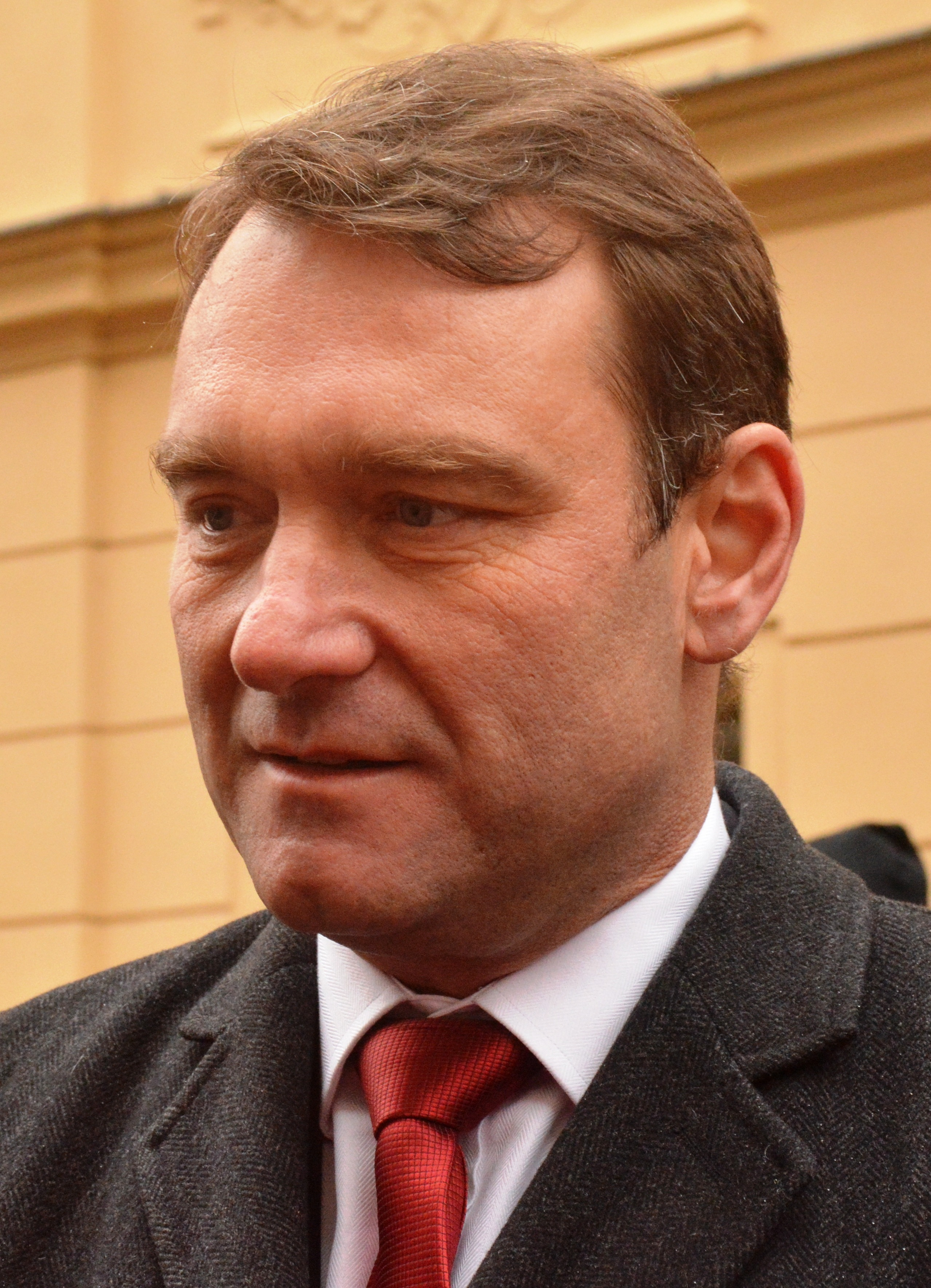

Member of the Chamber of Deputies
- Incumbent
- Assumed office 3 June 2006

Personal details
- Born: 29 July 1969 (age 56) Prostějov, Czechoslovakia
- Party: Freedom and Direct Democracy (2015–present)
- Other party: Civic Democratic Party (1998–2012); Dawn of Direct Democracy (2013–2015)

Radim Fiala (born 29 July 1969) is a Czech politician and businessman from Prostějov. From 2006 to 2013 he was a member of the Chamber of Deputies of the Czech Republic, elected as a candidate of the Civic Democratic Party (ODS). He left ODS in 2012 and then joined Dawn of Direct Democracy. He left Dawn in 2013 and co-founded Freedom and Direct Democracy.

On 4 January 2025, Fiala claimed that it had not been proven that Russia was behind the attack on Vrbětice ammunition depot in 2014. In response, PM Andrej Babiš and ANO 2011 ministers dismissed Fiala's claims.

On 30 June 2026, Fiala was elected the new chairperson of the ČEZ Supervisory Board.
