= Jan Bartošek =

Czech politician

Jan Bartošek MP
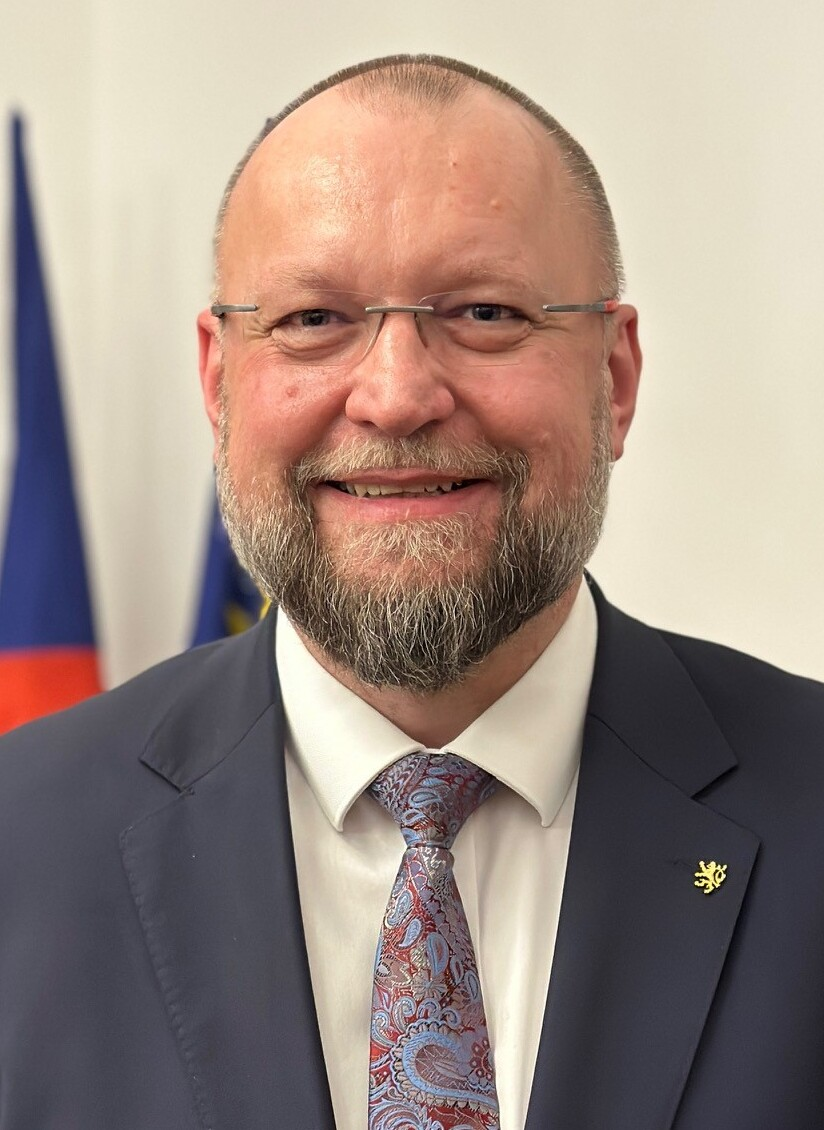
- Bartošek in 2024

Deputy President of the Chamber of Deputies
- In office 10 November 2021 – 8 October 2025
- In office 6 February 2014 – 26 October 2017

1st Vice-Chairman of KDU-ČSL
- In office 23 April 2022 – 18 October 2024
- Preceded by: Šárka Jelínková
- Succeeded by: Pavel Bělobrádek

Vice-Chairman of KDU-ČSL
- In office 16 December 2011 – 23 April 2022

Member of the Chamber of Deputies
- Incumbent
- Assumed office 26 October 2013

Personal details
- Born: 10 November 1971 (age 54) Jihlava, Czechoslovakia (now Czech Republic)
- Party: KDU-ČSL
- Children: 2
- Education: University of South Bohemia; Czech University of Life Sciences; Palacký University

Jan Bartošek (born 10 November 1971) is a Czech politician and member of the Chamber of Deputies for the KDU-ČSL since October 2013.

He was one of the candidates for the 2019 Christian and Democratic Union – Czechoslovak People's Party leadership election.

On 22 October 2019, the Chamber of Deputies passed a non-binding resolution "condemn[ing] all activities and statements by groups calling for a boycott of the State of Israel, its goods, services or citizens." Bartošek introduced the resolution.
