= Jiří Mihola =

Czech politician

Jiří Mihola MP
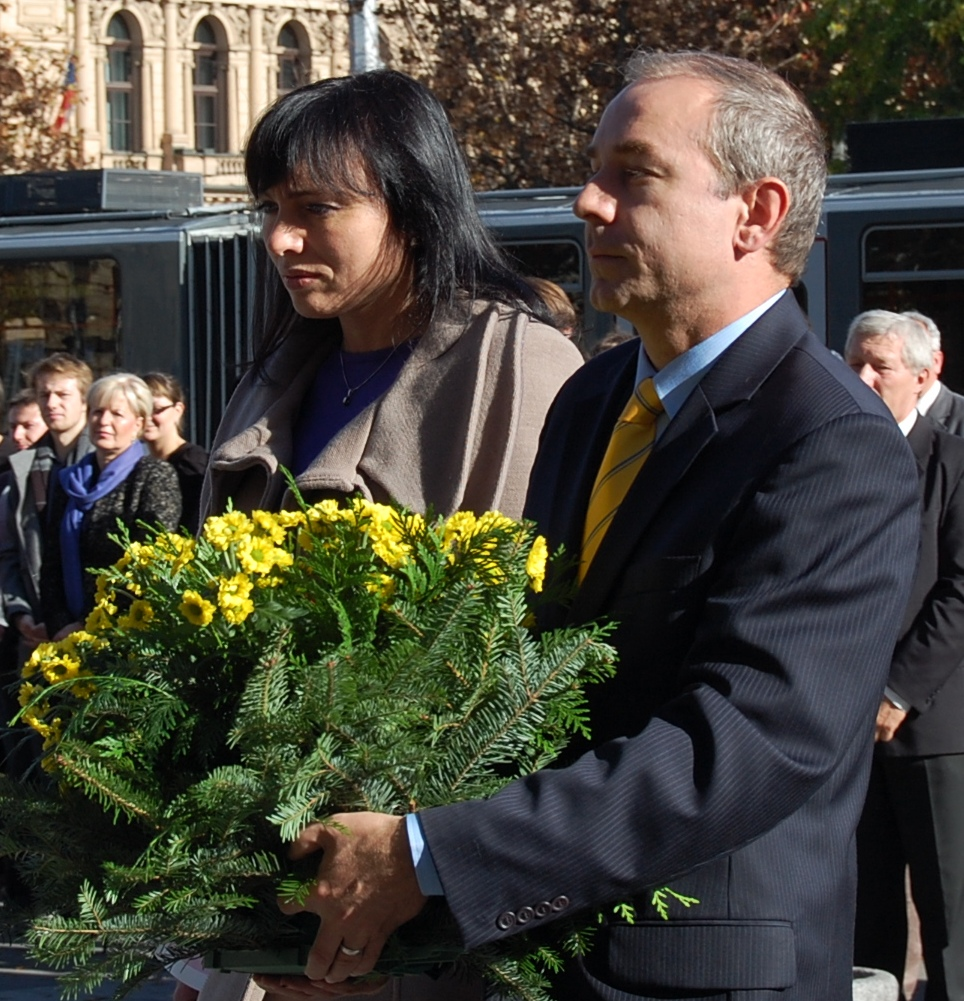

Member of the Chamber of Deputies
- In office 26 October 2013 – 21 October 2021

Personal details
- Born: 1 June 1972 (age 54) Brno, Czechoslovakia (now Czech Republic)
- Party: Christian and Democratic Union – Czechoslovak People's Party
- Children: 2
- Education: Masaryk University

Jiří Mihola (born 1 June 1972) is a Czech politician and former member of the Chamber of Deputies for the Christian and Democratic Union – Czechoslovak People's Party (KDU-ČSL) from October 2013 to October 2021.
