= Freedom and Direct Democracy =

Political party in the Czech Republic

Freedom and Direct Democracy Svoboda a přímá demokracie
- Abbreviation: SPD
- Leader: Tomio Okamura
- Deputy Leaders: Radim Fiala; Ivan David; Radek Rozvoral; Radovan Vích
- Founded: 5 May 2015; 11 years ago
- Split from: Dawn of Direct Democracy
- Headquarters: Rytířská 6, Prague
- Newspaper: Na vlastní oči
- Youth wing: Mladí Espéďáci
- Membership (2026): 10,753
- Ideology: Nationalism; Neo-fascism; Right-wing populism; Hard Euroscepticism
- Political position: Far-right
- National affiliation: SPD–Tricolour–Svobodní–PRO
- European affiliation: ID Party (2015–2024); ESN Party (since 2024)
- European Parliament group: ID Group (2019–2024); ESN Group (since 2024)
- Colours: Blue
- Chamber of Deputies: 15 / 200
- Senate: 0 / 81
- European Parliament: 1 / 21
- Regional councils: 35 / 675
- Governors of the regions: 0 / 13
- Local councils: 492 / 62,300

Website
- spd.cz

Freedom and Direct Democracy (Czech: Svoboda a přímá demokracie, SPD) is a far-right political party in the Czech Republic. It is led by Tomio Okamura and holds 15 seats in the Chamber of Deputies. Its political positions are nationalist and neo-fascist, espousing right-wing populism, expressing opposition to immigration, and being staunchly Eurosceptic, while in its political program it states its support for direct democracy.

At the end of 2022, the party had 10,682 members and was the fastest-growing party in the country in terms of members.

In December 2025, Freedom and Direct Democracy formed a majority coalition government in the Czech Republic with ANO and Motorists for Themselves.

== History ==
The party was founded in May 2015 by Tomio Okamura and Radim Fiala when eight Members of Parliament split from the Dawn of Direct Democracy parliamentary group. As the party was newly formed in that parliamentary term, these MPs sat as independents until the 2017 Czech parliamentary election. Following that election, the party held 22 seats in the Czech Chamber of Deputies.

Freedom and Direct Democracy is named after the European Parliament Eurosceptic political group Europe of Freedom and Direct Democracy. The party has links with Marine Le Pen's National Front, which is a member of the Europe of Nations and Freedom, a separate Eurosceptic political group in the European Parliament, and Marine Le Pen endorsed SPD before the 2017 Czech parliamentary election.

In December 2017, SPD hosted a conference of the Movement for a Europe of Nations and Freedom in Prague, alongside parties such as the French National Front, Dutch Party for Freedom, Freedom Party of Austria, and Lega Nord of Italy.

In 2019, following the European Parliament elections, SPD entered the European Parliament with two MEPs, who sit with the Identity and Democracy group.

In July 2020, SPD MP Tereza Hyťhová defected to become the third MP for the Tricolour Citizens' Movement.

During the 2021 Czech parliamentary election, SPD finished fourth with 20 MPs.

On 25 February 2022, the party established its own think tank, the Institute of Freedom and Direct Democracy, focused on the "development of democracy, the rule of law, pluralism of opinions and the protection of fundamental human rights", with Josef Nerušil as its first Chairman.

On 14 September 2022, MEP Hynek Blaško left SPD due to disagreement with Okamura's leadership of the party.

On 28 June 2024, Freedom and Direct Democracy announced it would leave the Identity and Democracy group to form a new, Alternative for Germany-led group called "Europe of Sovereign Nations", citing disagreements with ANO 2011 on the European Green Deal, immigration, censorship, and Ukraine.

In December 2025, Freedom and Direct Democracy formed a majority coalition government in the Czech Republic with ANO and Motorists for Themselves.

On 3 June 2026, the District Court for Prague 1 imposed a fine of CZK 3 million (EUR 124,000) on the party for its election adverts from 2024. The court ruled that the party had perpetrated the crime of incitement to hatred. SPD denied the charges, asserting that it was expressing its political opinions on the migration pact and benefit recipients. SPD leader Tomio Okamura said the party would appeal the verdict.

At the 2026 Czech municipal elections, the party lost over 60% of its elected representatives. None of the party's nominated candidates were elected in the Senate elections held at the same time.

=== Mladí Espéďáci ===
The party's youth wing, Mladí Espéďáci (English: Young SPD members; MES) was established in April 2021 via Facebook, with Martin Malášek as the first leader. Diana Chodžajanová, a former contestant in Česko hledá SuperStar, became one of the faces of MES, appearing in short clips to promote the organisation. In July 2022, the MES page was removed from Facebook.

=== Cultural impact ===
A 2017 song by SPD supporters Jan Žižka and Olivie Žižková called Já volím SPD (I'm voting SPD) went viral in the Czech Republic and became the target of ridicule. This led to Žižková being jokingly voted into the top 30 female singers at the 2017 Český slavík awards.

== Policies and ideology ==
On its website and policy brief, SPD refers to itself as "a patriotic and democratic movement" with a focus on political reform, law and order, direct democracy, entrepreneurship, and national sovereignty. The party also advocates for reducing state surveillance, reforming the Czech tax system, supporting internet freedom, and encouraging more citizen-led participation in national politics.

Political commentators have variously described the party as right-wing populist, nationalist, and anti-immigration in its platform and rhetoric. SPD has described itself as a national conservative party. In April 2023, a court ruled that a description of the party as "fascist" by the magazine Respekt was "in accordance with the requirement of proportionality", and the magazine did not thus need to apologise for using this description. SPD has been described as neo-fascist by news outlets including Balkan Insight, bne Intellinews, Le Monde diplomatique, and European Interest.

The party opposes Czech membership in the European Union and has been continuously calling for the Czech Republic to withdraw from the European Union. The party strongly opposes illegal immigration and the EU's policy of migrant quotas, and advocates a more restrictive immigration policy, particularly towards immigration from Islamic nations, and rejects multiculturalism. The party says that it does not seek to promote hatred towards any race or culture, but argues for the protection of "Judeo-Christian" values and believes that migrant quotas will lead to the "Islamization" of Europe.

SPD takes a pro-Israel stance on the Gaza war, with Okamura stating that he supports Israel on all major issues.

Okamura has repeatedly called for suspending Czech military aid to Ukraine in the Russo-Ukrainian War, alongside believing that the Russian invasion of Ukraine should be addressed through peace talks between Russia and Ukraine, while claiming that the war should be brought to an end, even at the expense of Ukraine. The party has been widely labelled as "pro-Russian".

The party strongly opposes same-sex couples having the right to hold civil weddings.

The party has been criticised for posting "misleading and manipulative content on social media", with the Ministry of Interior stating in July 2020 that SPD is the leading publisher of content featuring racial, ethnic, and religious hatred.

== Membership ==
Tomio Okamura often claims that SPD has a membership of thousands of members. In October 2017, he claimed that SPD has 7,000 members, and in November 2017 12,000 members. Doubt has been cast on these figures, with the suggestion that Okamura often conflates numbers of supporters with actual members. It was reported in 2015 that SPD had only 20 members, compared to Okamura's claims of 10,000. In February 2018, the party claimed to have 1,200 members, while in July of the same year, its membership figure reportedly stood at 1,400 individuals.

== Election results ==
SPD support in the 2017 election

=== Chamber of Deputies ===
Election	Leader	Votes	%	Seats	+/–	Position	Status
2017	Tomio Okamura	538,574	10.64	22 / 200	▲14	▲4th	Opposition
2021	Tomio Okamura	513,910	9.56	20 / 200	▼2	4th	Opposition
2025	Tomio Okamura	437,611	7.78	15 / 200	▼5	▼5th	Coalition

=== Senate ===
Election	First round			Second round			Seats	+/–
Election	Votes	%	Place	Votes	%	Place	Seats	+/–
2016	5,988	0.68	20th				0 / 27	Steady
2018	70,110	6.44	7th				0 / 27	Steady
2020	61,352	6.15	7th				0 / 27	Steady
2022	85,855	7.72	4th	2,791	0.58	15th	0 / 27	Steady
2024	42,733	5.39	6th	3,318	0.85	11th	0 / 27	Steady
2026	57,301	4.96	5th				0 / 27	Steady

=== Presidency ===
Election	Candidate	First round			Second round		
Election	Candidate	Votes	%	Result	Votes	%	Result
2018	Supported Miloš Zeman	1,985,547	38.56	First place	2,853,390	51.37	Won
2023	Jaroslav Bašta	248,375	4.45	Fifth place			

=== European Parliament ===
Election	List leader	Votes	%	Seats	+/−	EP Group
2019	Ivan David	216,718	9.14 (#5)	2 / 21	New	ID
2024 (Note: Run in a joint list with Tricolour.)	Petr Mach	170,172	5.73 (#7)	1 / 21	▼1	ESN

=== Regional councils ===
Election	Vote	%	Seats	+/–	Position
2016 (Note: Participated in coalition with Party of Civic Rights)	153,099	5.7	18 / 675	▲18	▲6th
2020	169,978	6.1	35 / 675	▲17	▲5th

=== Local ===
Election	%	Councillors
2018		155 / 61,892
2022		493 / 61,892
2026	2,77	166 / 61,892

=== Prague City Assembly ===
Election	Leader	Votes	%	Seats	+/–	Position	Status
2018	Hynek Beran	895,859	3.54	0 / 65	Steady	▲6th	Opposition
2022	Milan Urban	1,218,622	5.17	3 / 65	▲3	6th	Opposition
2026	Milan Urban	854,752	3.48	0 / 65	▼3	6th	
