= Pavel Bělobrádek =

Czech politician

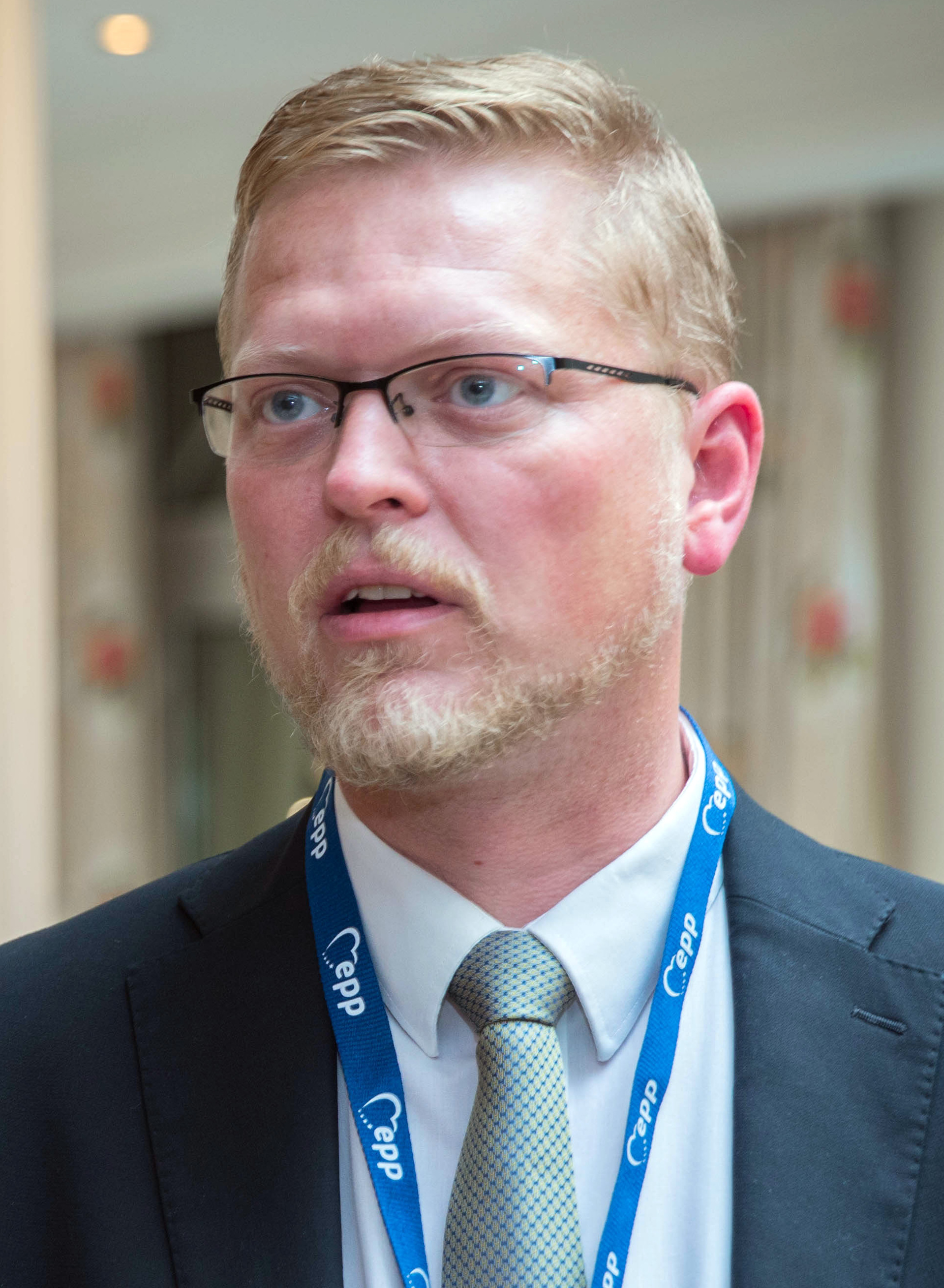
- Bělobrádek in 2018

Deputy Prime Minister of the Czech Republic Minister of Science and Research
- In office 29 January 2014 – 13 December 2017
- Prime Minister: Bohuslav Sobotka
- Preceded by: Martin Pecina
- Succeeded by: Richard Brabec; Martin Stropnický

Leader of KDU-ČSL
- In office 20 November 2010 – 29 March 2019
- Preceded by: Cyril Svoboda
- Succeeded by: Marek Výborný

1st Vice-Chairman of KDU-ČSL
- In office 18 October 2024 – 24 April 2026
- Preceded by: Jan Bartošek
- Succeeded by: Benjamin Činčila

Member of the Chamber of Deputies
- In office 26 October 2013 – 8 October 2025

Personal details
- Born: 25 December 1976 (age 49) Náchod, Czechoslovakia
- Party: KDU-ČSL
- Profession: Veterinary physician

Pavel Bělobrádek (Czech pronunciation: [ˈpavɛl ˈbjɛlobraːdɛk]; born 25 December 1976) is a Czech politician who served as the leader of KDU-ČSL from 2010 to 2019.

== Political career ==
=== 2010–2013 ===
In the 2010 Czech parliamentary election, Bělobrádek was elected as a representative of Náchod, receiving 280 votes.

On 8 June 2013, Bělobrádek was re-elected as chairman of KDU-ČSL at the convention in Olomouc, despite opposition from Zuzana Roithová.

In the 2013 Czech parliamentary election, Bělobrádek ran as the leader of KDU-ČSL in the Hradec Králové Region. He was subsequently elected chairman of the KDU-ČSL Parliamentary Club. On 27 November 2013, he was elected Deputy Speaker, receiving 133 votes in a secret ballot. In December of the same year, he resigned as chairman of the party's parliamentary club and was succeeded by Marian Jurečka.

=== 2014–2017 ===
In January 2014, Bělobrádek was nominated by KDU-ČSL as their candidate for the position of Deputy Prime Minister for Science, Research, and Innovation in Bohuslav Sobotka's cabinet. He also defended his position during the 2014 Czech municipal elections.

At the 2015 congress in Zlín, Bělobrádek was elected chairman of KDU-ČSL for the third time. In the 2016 Czech regional elections, he successfully defended his mandate as a representative of the Hradec Králové Region as a party member.

=== 2018 Czech municipal elections ===
On 1 February 2018, Bělobrádek announced his intention to run for KDU-ČSL in the 2018 Czech municipal elections. He won the first round with 26.62% of the votes but faced Martin Červíček in the second round, where he was ultimately defeated. In March 2019, Bělobrádek announced that he would step down as chairman of KDU-ČSL. He was succeeded by Marek Výborný.

=== 2020s ===
In the 2020 Czech regional elections, Bělobrádek served as the leader of the Coalition for the Hradec Králové Region. He successfully defended his mandate as a regional representative. On 2 November 2020, he was appointed Second Deputy Governor of the Hradec Králové Region for Environment and Agriculture.

In the 2021 Czech parliamentary election, Bělobrádek was a member of KDU-ČSL and the second-place candidate for the Spolu coalition. He received 10,691 preferential votes and was re-elected as a Member of Parliament.

In the 2022 Czech municipal elections, Bělobrádek ran for a council seat in Náchod, placed 20th on the KDU-ČSL candidate list. He finished in fourth place but failed to secure the mandate.

On 19 October 2024, Bělobrádek was elected 1st Vice-Chairman of KDU-ČSL at the convention in Olomouc.

== Personal life ==
Bělobrádek is married to his wife, Jana. They have a son named Josef, as well as daughters, Anežka and Marie.

Before the 2010 Czech parliamentary election, Bělobrádek revealed that he had been diagnosed with multiple sclerosis, but his condition had been stable for ten years. One week after the unsuccessful parliamentary elections, Bělobrádek declared that the current situation of the People's Party was behind them.

Bělobrádek is a gun owner authorized to carry a firearm for protection.
