= 2024 KDU–ČSL leadership election =

Political party leader election in the Czech Republic

- 18 October 2024
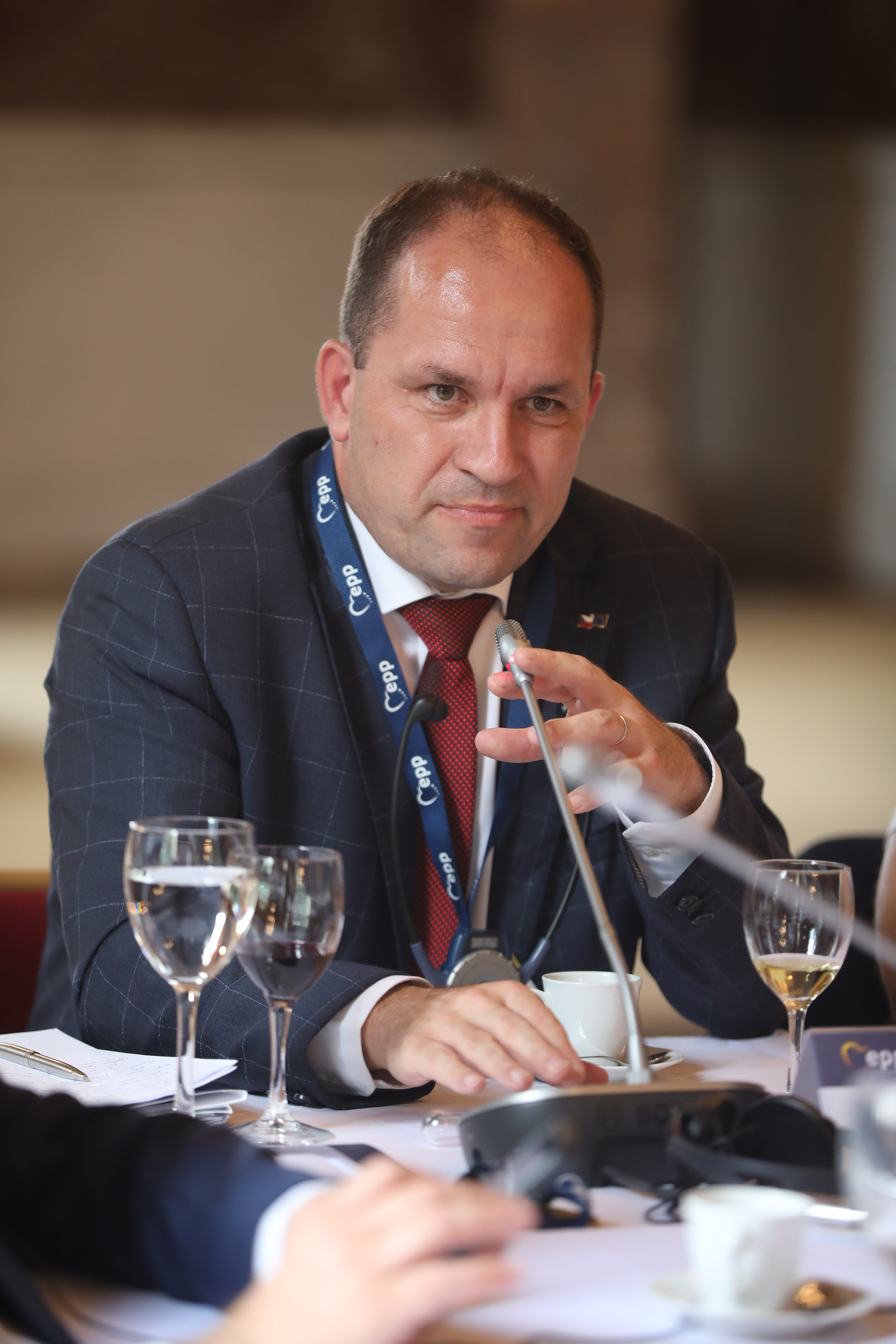

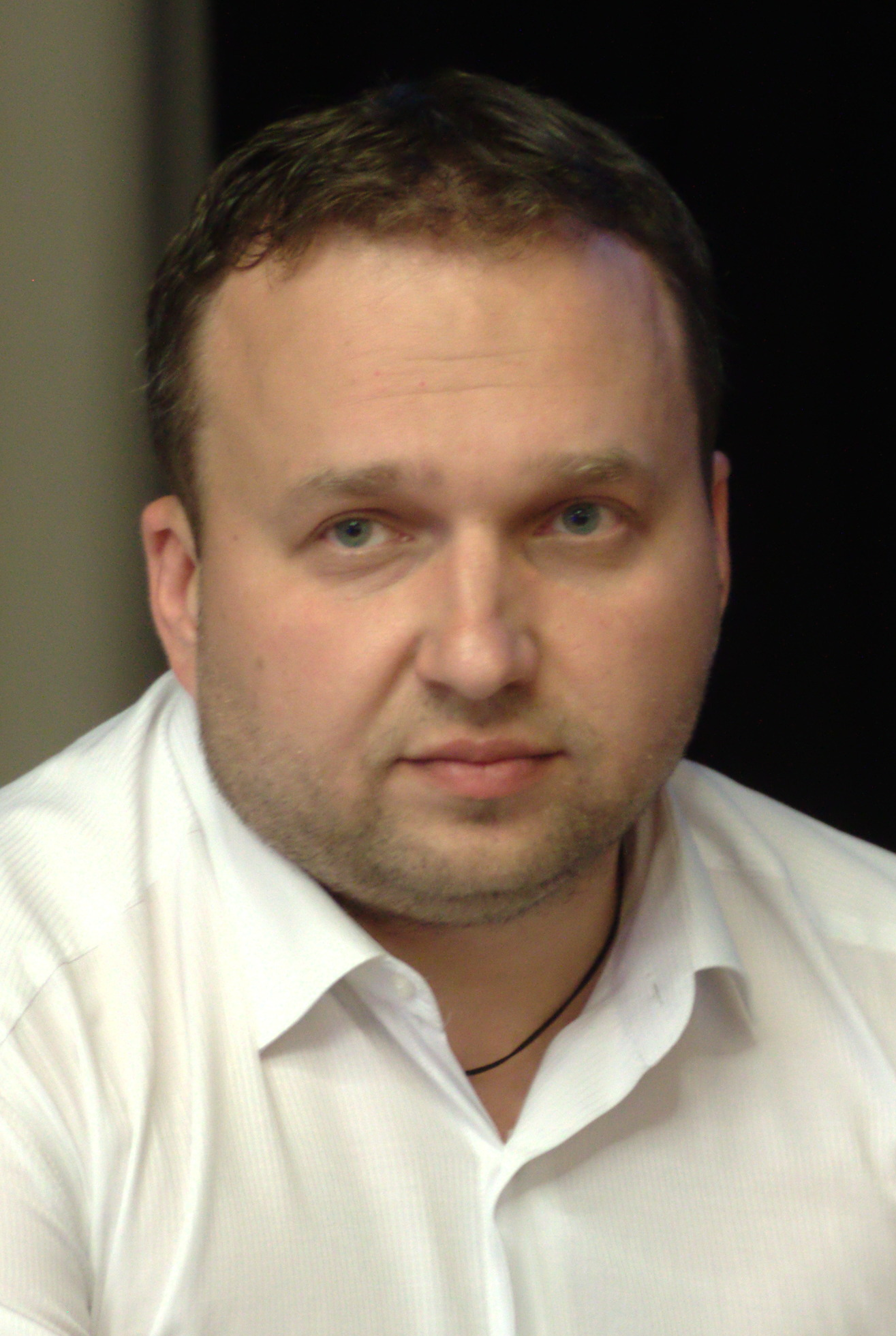
Candidate	Marek Výborný	Marian Jurečka
Electoral vote	159	107
Percentage	55%	37%
leader of KDU-ČSL before election
Marian Jurečka
Elected leader of KDU-ČSL
Marek Výborný

A leadership election for KDU-ČSL was held on 18 October 2024. Marek Výborný was elected the new leader.

== Background ==
Marian Jurečka became leader of the party in 2020. Under his leadership it became part of Spolu alliance which won 2021 parliamentary election and Cabinet of Petr Fiala was formed. KDU-ČSL became part of government. Voting preferences of KDU-ČSL dropped to 2% and Jurečka stated that he will decide whether he wil run for reelection after 2024 European Parliament election and 2024 Czech regional elections. He set up a task to complete if he wants to run for another term. Terms were to reverse the trend of declining preferences, succeed in the European election and succeed in regional and senate elections. He failed to achieve one of these tasks as KDU-ČSL won only 1 seat in European Parliament indstead of 2.

Following European Parliament election discussions within the party about new leader started. Discussed candidates included Governor of South Moravian Region Jan Grolich, Senator Jiří Čunek and Ministers Marek Výborný and Petr Hladík. Grolich led Spolu alliance to victory in 2024 Souh Bohemian regional election with 40% of votes which confirmed his as potential candidate for leader. Grolich stated that he would run only if Jurečka decides not to seek another term. Jurečka stated on 21 September 2024 that he will announce his decision in one week. Grolich's potential candidacy was endorsed by Ministers Marek Výborný and Petr Hladík. Another potential candidate Jiří Čunek mentioned on 22 September 2024 that he is yet to decide whether he runs for the leader. On 30 September 2024 Grolich announced he won't run for the position of leader. South Moravian regional organisation then nominated Marek Výborný. Výborný stated that he will decide in several days whether he runs or not. On 3 October 2024, Výborný announced candidacy. Jurečka announced his candidacy on the same day. Jiří Čunek announced candidacy on 14 October 2024. On 17 October 2024, Šimon Heller and Tomáš Kaplan announced candidacy. Jiří Regner announced candidacy on 18 October 2024, while Pavel Bělobrádek and Michaela Šojdrová decided to not run.

== Candidates ==
- Marian Jurečka, the incumbent leader and Minister of Labour and Social Affairs
- Jiří Čunek, Senator and former leader of the party.
- Šimon Heller, MP
- Tomáš Kaplan, leader of Prague organisation
- Marek Výborný, Minister of Agriculture and former leader of the party initially expressed interest in running before endorsing Grolich for the position. After Grolich decided to not run, Výborný received nomination from South Moravian regional organisation. He decided to run.
- Jiří Regner, deputy mayor of Červený Kostelec.

=== Potential candidates ===
- Aleš Dufek, MP.
- Tomáš Zdechovský, MEP.

=== Declined to run ===
- Petr Hladík, Minister of the Environment initially expressed interest in running but eventually endorsed Grolich for the position.
- Jan Grolich, South Moravian Governor.
- Pavel Bělobrádek, former leader and MP, endorsed both Jurečka and Výborný.
- Michaela Šojdrová, former MEP, endorsed both Jurečka and Výborný.

== Voting ==
Two candidates advanced form 1st round of voting. Výborný received 114 votes and Jurečka 78 votes.

Candidate	1st round	%	2nd round	%
Marek Výborný	114	39.31	159	55.21
Marian Jurečka	78	26.90	107	37.15
Jiří Čunek	53	18.28		
Tomáš Kaplan	21	7.24		
Šimon Heller	19	6.55		
Jiří Regner	2	0.69		
Invalid	3	1.03	22	7.64
turnout	290		288	
