= Third cabinet of Andrej Babiš =

Government of the Czech Republic (2025-present)

- 17th Cabinet of the Czech Republic
- 2025–present
- Andrej Babiš, prime minister
- Date formed: 15 December 2025

People and organisations
- President: Petr Pavel
- Prime Minister: Andrej Babiš
- Deputy Prime Minister: Karel Havlíček; Alena Schillerová; Jaromír Zůna; Petr Macinka
- No. of ministers: 15
- Member parties: ANO; SPD; AUTO
- Status in legislature: Majority (coalition)
- Opposition parties: ODS; STAN; Pirates; KDU-ČSL; TOP 09
- Opposition leaders: Martin Kupka

History
- Election: 2025 Czech parliamentary election
- Predecessor: Fiala

The third cabinet of Andrej Babiš is the current government of the Czech Republic. Following elections in October 2025, Andrej Babiš announced his intention to form a coalition government consisting of his party ANO, with Freedom and Direct Democracy (SPD) and Motorists for Themselves (AUTO).

On 6 November 2025, Tomio Okamura from Freedom and Direct Democracy (SPD) was elected President of the Chamber of Deputies for the new parliament with 107 votes.

The list of ministerial candidates was presented to President Petr Pavel on 26 November 2025, and the cabinet was sworn in on 15 December 2025.

== Composition ==
| Portfolio | Minister | Took office | Left office | Party |
Government Office
| Prime Minister | Andrej Babiš | 9 December 2025 | Incumbent | ANO |
Ministry of Interior
| Minister of Interior | Lubomír Metnar | 15 December 2025 | Incumbent | ANO |
Ministry of Labour and Social Affairs
| Minister of Labour and Social Affairs | Aleš Juchelka | 15 December 2025 | Incumbent | ANO |
Ministry for Regional Development
| Minister for Regional Development | Zuzana Mrázová | 15 December 2025 | Incumbent | ANO |
Ministry of Health
| Minister of Health | Adam Vojtěch (Note: Independent politician nominated by ANO) | 15 December 2025 | Incumbent | ANO |
Ministry of Education, Youth, and Sports
| Minister of Education | Robert Plaga | 15 December 2025 | Incumbent | ANO |
Ministry of Finance
| Deputy Prime Minister, Minister of Finance | Alena Schillerová | 15 December 2025 | Incumbent | ANO |
Ministry of Defence
| Deputy Prime Minister, Minister of Defence | Jaromír Zůna (Note: Independent politician nominated by SPD) | 15 December 2025 | Incumbent | SPD |
Ministry of Justice
| Minister of Justice | Jeroným Tejc | 15 December 2025 | Incumbent | ANO |
Ministry of Foreign Affairs
| Deputy Prime Minister, Minister of Foreign Affairs | Petr Macinka | 15 December 2025 | Incumbent | AUTO |
Ministry of Trade and Industry
| First Deputy Prime Minister, Minister of Trade and Industry | Karel Havlíček | 15 December 2025 | Incumbent | ANO |
Ministry of Transport
| Minister of Transport | Ivan Bednárik | 15 December 2025 | Incumbent | SPD |
Ministry of Agriculture
| Minister of Agriculture | Martin Šebestyán | 15 December 2025 | Incumbent | SPD |
Ministry of Environment
| Minister of Environment | Petr Macinka (acting) | 15 December 2025 | 23 February 2026 | AUTO |
| Minister of Environment | Igor Červený | 23 February 2026 | Incumbent | AUTO |
Ministry of Culture
| Minister of Culture | Oto Klempíř | 15 December 2025 | Incumbent | AUTO |
Minister Without Portfolio
| Minister for Sports, Prevention, and Health | Boris Šťastný | 15 December 2025 | Incumbent | AUTO |

== Party composition ==
| Party | Ideology | Leader | Deputies | Ministers |
|---|---|---|---|---|
| ANO | Right-wing populism | Andrej Babiš | 80 / 200 | 9 / 16 |
| SPD | Nationalism | Tomio Okamura | 15 / 200 | 3 / 16 |
| AUTO | National conservatism | Petr Macinka | 13 / 200 | 4 / 16 |
| Total | | | 108 / 200 | 16 |

== Confidence motion ==
Motion of confidence Andrej Babiš (ANO)
| Ballot → | 15 January 2026 |
| Required majority → | 100 out of 199 (simple) |
| Yes: • ANO (80); • SPD (15); • AUTO (13) | 108 / 200 |
| No: • ODS (27); • Pirates (18); • KDU-ČSL (16); • STAN (21); • TOP 09 (9) | 91 / 200 |
| Abstentions | 0 / 200 |
| Absentees: • STAN (1) | 1 / 200 |

A vote of no confidence in the government was called at the request of the opposition. The motion was in response to the revelation of a conversation between Foreign Minister Macinka and the president's advisor Petr Kolář, which was interpreted by the president as blackmail and reported to the authorities. In the messages, Macinka sought to pressure the president into appointing the AUTO MP Filip Turek as the Minister of the Environment. The vote took place on 4 February 2026.

Motion of no confidence Andrej Babiš (ANO)
| Ballot → | 4 February 2026 |
| Required majority → | 101 out of 183 (absolute) |
| Yes: • ODS (25); • Pirates (15); • STAN (21); • KDU-ČSL (14); • TOP 09 (9) | 84 / 200 |
| No: • ANO (71); • SPD (15); • AUTO (13) | 99 / 200 |
| Abstentions | 0 / 200 |
| Absentees: • ANO (9); • ODS (2); • STAN (1); • Pirates (3); • KDU-ČSL (2) | 17 / 200 |

A vote of no confidence in the government was called at the request of the opposition. The motion was in response to the size of the proposed 2027 state budget deficit, Babiš's unresolved conflict of interest, and government attacks on independent institutions. The vote took place on 1 October 2026.

Motion of no confidence Andrej Babiš (ANO)
| Ballot → | 1 October 2026 |
| Required majority → | 101 out of 177 (absolute) |
| Yes: • ODS (23); • Pirates (16); • STAN (22); • KDU-ČSL (14); • TOP 09 (8) | 83 / 200 |
| No: • ANO (70); • SPD (15); • AUTO (9) | 94 / 200 |
| Abstentions | 0 / 200 |
| Absentees: • ANO (8); • ODS (4); • AUTO (4); • Pirates (2); • KDU-ČSL (2); • TOP 09 (1) | 21 / 200 |

== Actions ==
On 7 November 2025, Tomio Okamura President of the Chamber of Deputies, orderded the removal of the Ukrainian flag from the parliament building, which had been raised there since the start of Russia's invasion in 2022. In reaction, the opposition Civic Democratic Party (ODS) and Pirates hung Ukrainian flags from their club windows. On 17 January 2026, Okamura ordered the removal of the EU flag from his office, which was replaced by another Czech flag.

On 7 January 2026, Babiš confirmed that the ammunition initiative for Ukraine would continue, having previously criticised the scheme as opaque and called for it to be audited or scrapped.

== See also ==
- Hungary's Fifth Orbán Government
- Slovakia's Fico's Fourth Cabinet
