= Cabinet of Petr Fiala =

Government of the Czech Republic (2021–2025)

- Government of the Czech Republic
- 2021–2025
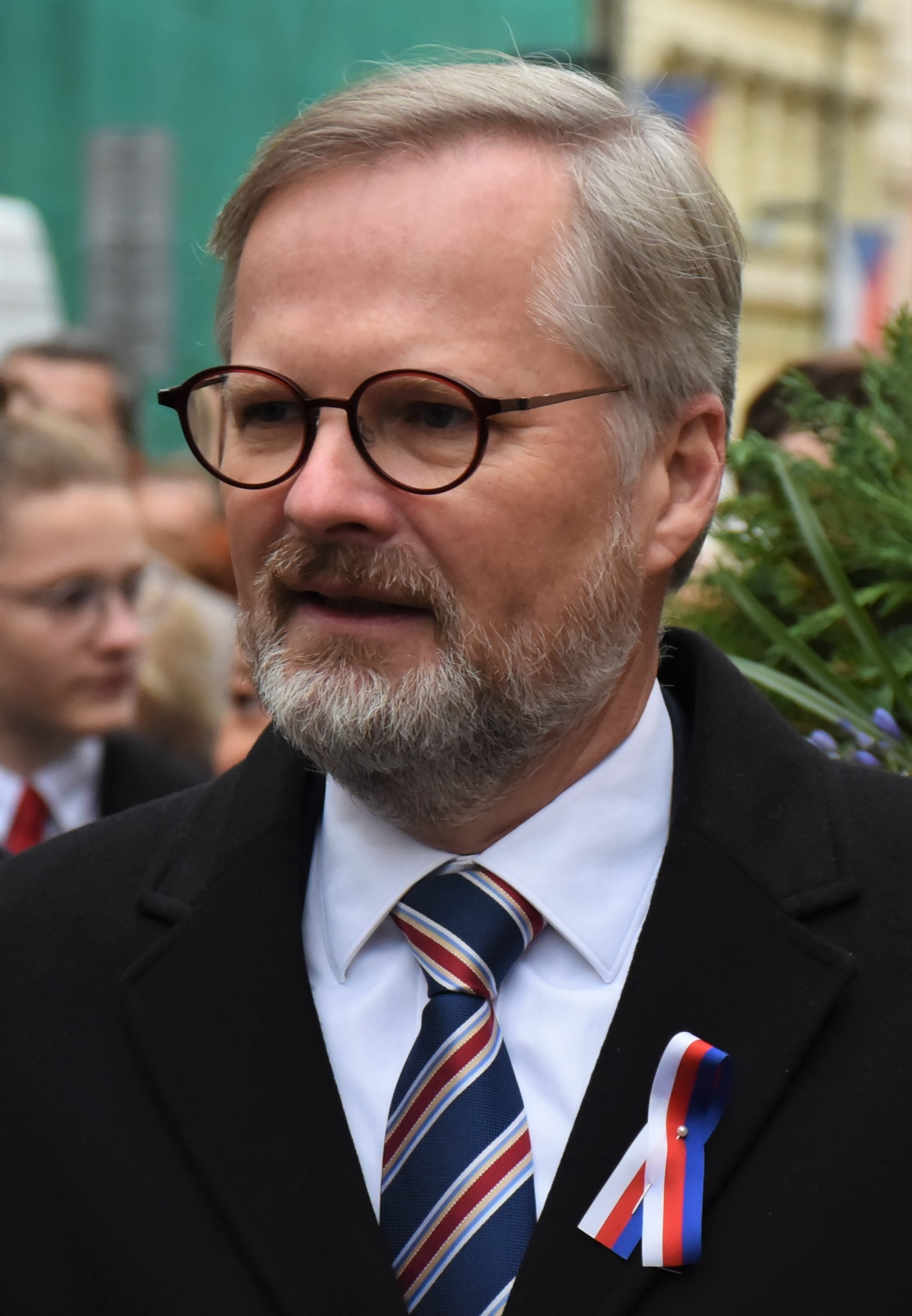
- Date formed: 17 December 2021
- Date dissolved: 15 December 2025

People and organisations
- President: Miloš Zeman (until 2023); Petr Pavel (from 2023)
- Prime Minister: Petr Fiala
- Deputy Prime Minister: Vít Rakušan; Marian Jurečka; Vlastimil Válek
- No. of ministers: 17
- Member parties: ODS; STAN; KDU-ČSL; TOP 09; Pirates (until 1 October 2024)
- Status in legislature: Majority (Coalition)
- Opposition parties: ANO; SPD; Pirates (since 1 October 2024)
- Opposition leader: Andrej Babiš

History
- Election: 2021 Czech parliamentary election
- Predecessor: Babiš II
- Successor: Babiš III

The Cabinet of Petr Fiala was a coalition government of the Czech Republic which was in office from December 2021 until December 2025. Following elections in October 2021, President Miloš Zeman asked Petr Fiala, as the leader of the Spolu alliance, to form a new government. On 17 November 2021 Fiala presented Zeman with the names of his proposed cabinet, and Zeman agreed to appoint Fiala as the new prime minister on 28 November 2021. Zeman met with all the ministerial nominees during the week following Fiala's appointment, expressing disagreement with the appointment of Jan Lipavský (Pirate Party) as foreign minister.

The cabinet of Petr Fiala repeatedly saw the lowest popularity ratings for a Czech government since Petr Nečas's in 2013, according to public opinion polls.

In September 2024 the cabinet experienced a serious crisis following extremely poor results for the government coalition parties in Czech regional and Senate elections. Fiala eventually sacked Ivan Bartoš, head of the coalition Pirate Party, who had been criticized for months over the poor implementation of the digitalization of construction permit procedures. In response, the Pirate Party left the coalition and other Pirate Party members offered their resignation. On 1 October 2024, Fiala refused to accept the resignation of Jan Lipavský, who remained foreign minister as an independent, having left the Pirate party.

== Composition ==
Cabinet
Portfolio	Minister	Took office	Left office	Party
Government's Office
Prime Minister	Petr Fiala	28 November 2021	15 December 2025	ODS
Ministry of Interior
First Deputy Prime Minister; Minister of Interior	Vít Rakušan	17 December 2021	15 December 2025	STAN
Ministry of Labour and Social Affairs
Deputy Prime Minister; Minister of Labour and Social Affairs	Marian Jurečka	17 December 2021	15 December 2025	KDU-ČSL
Ministry for Regional Development
Deputy Prime Minister for Digitalisation; Minister for Regional Development	Ivan Bartoš	17 December 2021	30 September 2024	Pirates
Minister of Regional Development	Marian Jurečka (acting)	30 September 2024	7 October 2024	KDU-ČSL
Minister of Regional Development	Petr Kulhánek (Note: Member of KAO, STAN nominee)	8 October 2024	15 December 2025	STAN
Ministry of Health
Deputy Prime Minister; Minister of Health	Vlastimil Válek	17 December 2021	15 December 2025	TOP 09
Ministry of Finance
Minister of Finance	Zbyněk Stanjura	17 December 2021	15 December 2025	ODS
Ministry of Defence
Minister of Defence	Jana Černochová	17 December 2021	15 December 2025	ODS
Ministry of Justice
Minister of Justice	Pavel Blažek	17 December 2021	10 June 2025	ODS
Minister of Justice	Eva Decroix	10 June 2025	15 December 2025	ODS
Ministry of Foreign Affairs
Minister of Foreign Affairs	Jan Lipavský (Note: Initially in government for Pirates, when the Pirates left the government Lipavský left the party, but remained in government after a discussion with Prime Minister Fiala.)	17 December 2021	15 December 2025	Independent
Ministry of Trade and Industry
Minister of Trade and Industry	Jozef Síkela (Note: Independent, STAN nominee)	17 December 2021	7 October 2024	STAN
Minister of Trade and Industry	Lukáš Vlček	8 October 2024	15 December 2025	STAN
Ministry of Transport
Minister of Transport	Martin Kupka	17 December 2021	15 December 2025	ODS
Ministry of Education, Youth and Sport
Minister of Education	Petr Gazdík	17 December 2021	30 June 2022	STAN
Minister of Education	Vladimír Balaš	1 July 2022	4 May 2023	STAN
Minister of Education	Mikuláš Bek (Note: Independent, STAN nominee)	4 May 2023	15 December 2025	STAN
Ministry of Agriculture
Minister of Agriculture	Marian Jurečka (acting)	17 December 2021	3 January 2022	KDU-ČSL
Minister of Agriculture	Zdeněk Nekula	3 January 2022	28 June 2023	KDU-ČSL
Minister of Agriculture	Marek Výborný	29 June 2023	15 December 2025	KDU-ČSL
Ministry of Environment
Minister of Environment	Anna Hubáčková (Note: Independent, KDU-ČSL nominee)	17 December 2021	1 November 2022	KDU-ČSL
Minister of Environment	Marian Jurečka (acting)	1 November 2022	10 March 2023	KDU-ČSL
Minister of Environment	Petr Hladík	10 March 2023	15 December 2025	KDU-ČSL
Ministry of Culture
Minister of Culture	Martin Baxa	17 December 2021	15 December 2025	ODS
Ministers Without Portfolio
Minister for European Affairs	Mikuláš Bek (Note: Independent, STAN nominee)	17 December 2021	4 May 2023	STAN
Minister for European Affairs	Martin Dvořák	4 May 2023	15 December 2025	STAN
Minister for Science, Research and Innovation	Helena Langšádlová	17 December 2021	5 May 2024	TOP 09
Minister for Science, Research and Innovation	Marek Ženíšek	16 May 2024	15 December 2025	TOP 09
Minister for Legislation	Michal Šalomoun (Note: Independent, Pirates nominee)	17 December 2021	11 October 2024	Pirates

== Party composition ==
From the election until 30 September 2024 the following parties formed the government:

Party	Ideology	Leader	Deputies	Ministers
Civic Democratic Party	Conservatism	Petr Fiala	34 / 200	6 / 17
STAN	Localism	Vít Rakušan	33 / 200	4 / 17
KDU-ČSL	Christian democracy	Marian Jurečka	23 / 200	3 / 17
TOP 09	Liberal conservatism	Markéta Pekarová Adamová	14 / 200	2 / 17
Czech Pirate Party	Pirate politics	Ivan Bartoš	4 / 200	3 / 17
Total			108 / 200	18

After the Pirates left the government the governing parties are the following:

Party	Ideology	Leader	Deputies	Ministers
Civic Democratic Party	Conservatism	Petr Fiala	34 / 200	6 / 17
STAN	Localism	Vít Rakušan	33 / 200	5 / 17
KDU-ČSL	Christian democracy	Marian Jurečka	23 / 200	3 / 17
TOP 09	Liberal conservatism	Markéta Pekarová Adamová	14 / 200	2 / 17
Independents			0 / 150	1 / 17
Total			104 / 200	17

== Popular mandate ==
Support for governing parties according to the popular vote.

Member party	Popular vote	Percentage	MPs	Ministers	Leader
Spolu	1,493,701	27.79%	71	11	Petr Fiala
PirSTAN	839,448	15.61%	37	6	Ivan Bartoš
Government	2,333,149	43.40%	108	18	Petr Fiala
Czech Republic	5,411,292	100%	200	–	

== Confidence motion ==
Motion of confidence Petr Fiala (Spolu)
Ballot →	13 January 2022
Required majority →	97 out of 193 (simple)
Yes: • ODS (33); • Pirates (4); • KDU-ČSL (23); • STAN (32); • TOP 09 (14)	106 / 200
No: • ANO 2011 (68); • SPD (19)	87 / 200
Abstentions	0 / 200
Absentees: • ANO 2011 (4); • ODS (1); • STAN (1); • SPD (1)	7 / 200
