= Petr Hladík (politician) =

Czech politician (born 1984)

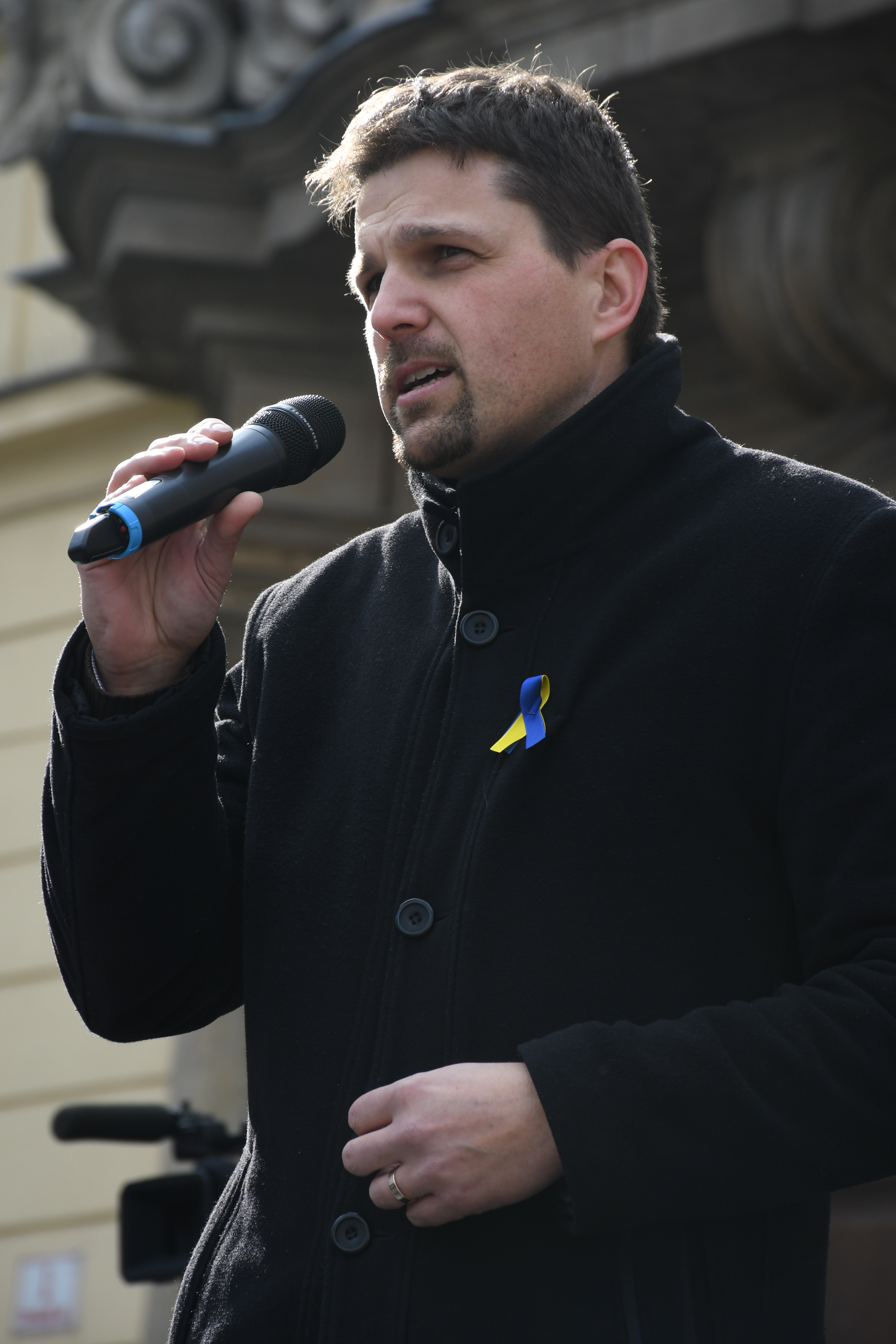
- Hladík in 2022

Minister of the Environment
- In office 10 March 2023 – 15 December 2025
- Prime Minister: Petr Fiala
- Preceded by: Marian Jurečka
- Succeeded by: Petr Macinka (acting)

Deputy Chairman of KDU–ČSL
- In office 30 March 2019 – 19 October 2024

Chairman of the Young Populars
- In office 27 October 2012 – 7 March 2015
- Preceded by: Position established
- Succeeded by: Vladimír Hanáček

Personal details
- Born: 28 September 1984 (age 42) Osová Bítýška, Czechoslovakia (now Czech Republic)
- Party: KDU–ČSL
- Spouse: Zuzana Hladíková
- Children: 5
- Education: Masaryk University
- Website: tadyhladik.cz

Petr Hladík (born 28 September 1984) is a Czech politician who served as Czech Minister of the Environment in the Cabinet of Petr Fiala from March 2023 to December 2025. He served as the deputy chairman of KDU-ČSL from March 2019 to October 2024.

From 2016 until 2023, Hladík was deputy mayor of Brno. He previously served as chairman of the Young Populars from 2012 until 2015.

== Political career ==
=== 2010s ===
In the 2010 Czech municipal elections, Hladík was elected as a KDU-ČSL representative of the Brno-sever district, and became a district council member the following month. He also ran for KDU-ČSL in the Brno city council elections, but was not elected.

In the 2014 Czech municipal elections, Hladík defended his mandate in Brno-sever as the leader of the KDU-ČSL candidate list, and was also elected to the Brno city assembly. On 18 June 2015, Hladík was appointed deputy mayor of the Brno-sever district with responsible for capital construction, education, culture and sports, social affairs, and informatics.

In the 2012 and 2016 Czech regional elections, Hladík was a KDU-ČSL candidate for the South Moravian regional assembly. He also ran on the KDU-ČSL list in the South Moravian Region for the 2013 parliamentary election, and the 2014 European parliament elections. On 21 June 2016, after the renewal of the city coalition, Hladík became 1st deputy mayor of Brno with responsibility for health and housing.

In the 2018 Brno municipal election, Hladík was the KDU-ČSL candidate for mayor. He was elected as a city representative, receiving 15,374 preferential votes), also defending his seat on the Brno-sever district council. In August 2022, he dismissed the director of Brno Zoo, Martina Hovorká, to be replaced by Radana Dungelová.

On 30 March 2019, Hladík was elected as vice-chairman of KDU-ČSL, defending the position at an extraordinary party congress in January 2020, as well as the party congress in April 2022.

=== 2020s ===
After the 2021 Czech parliamentary election, Hladík declined an offer to become Czech Minister for the Environment.

In 2022 Czech municipal elections, Hladík was the leader of the joint candidate list submitted by KDU-ČSL and STAN for the Brno city council elections. He also ran on a separate KDU-ČSL candidate list in the Brno-sever municipal district. He left his position as deputy mayor of Brno in October 2022.

In October 2022, Hladík was nominated by the KDU-ČSL leadership to take over as Czech Minister of the Environment from Anna Hubáčková. The same month, the police arrested 10 people in relation to alleged fraudulent allocation of council apartments in Brno; Hladík's office was searched by police during an intervention at the council offices. Hladík was not accused of any wrongdoing, but his nomination as minister was halted, and Marian Jurečka was appointed as acting Environment Minister on 1 November 2022 by President Miloš Zeman. In December 2022, Prime Minister Petr Fiala sent a proposal to President Zeman to appoint Hladík as Minister of the Environment.

After the meeting with Hladík held 4 January 2023, Zeman refused to comply with the proposal. Two days later, Jurečka stated after a party presidium meeting that Hladík would be appointed Deputy Minister of the Environment with effect from 9 January 2023, with Jurečka remaining as minister. On 28 February 2023, Fiala announced after a meeting with the newly-elected president Petr Pavel that Hladík would be appointed as Minister of Environment.

In October 2024, Hladík unsuccessfully ran for the position of 1st Vice-Chairman of KDU-ČSL. Afterwards he resigned as deputy leader.

== Controversy ==
In January 2023, Seznam Zprávy published information that Petr Hladík, as deputy mayor of Brno, had voted in 2022 in the interests of a businessman with whom he had friendly ties, and did not report a conflict of interest as required by law. This vote was allegedly related to a doubly overpriced purchase of land belonging to the city of Brno from Hladík's acquaintance Martin Unzeitig. The watchdog company Kverulant.org filed a criminal complaint against him in January 2023. However, this announcement was postponed in April 2023 by the Šlapanice Municipal Office, stating that the transfer of the land in question to the ownership of the city of Brno was in the public interest, not in the personal interest of Hladík.

In November 2023, the Ministry of Justice apologized to Hladík for the non-pecuniary damage caused by the improper action of the judge of the Municipal Court in Brno, Aleš Dufek, who unauthorizedly published information from the search warrant for Hladík's office, even though Hladík was not prosecuted in the case.
