= Marian Jurečka =

Czech politician (born 1981)

Marian Jurečka MP
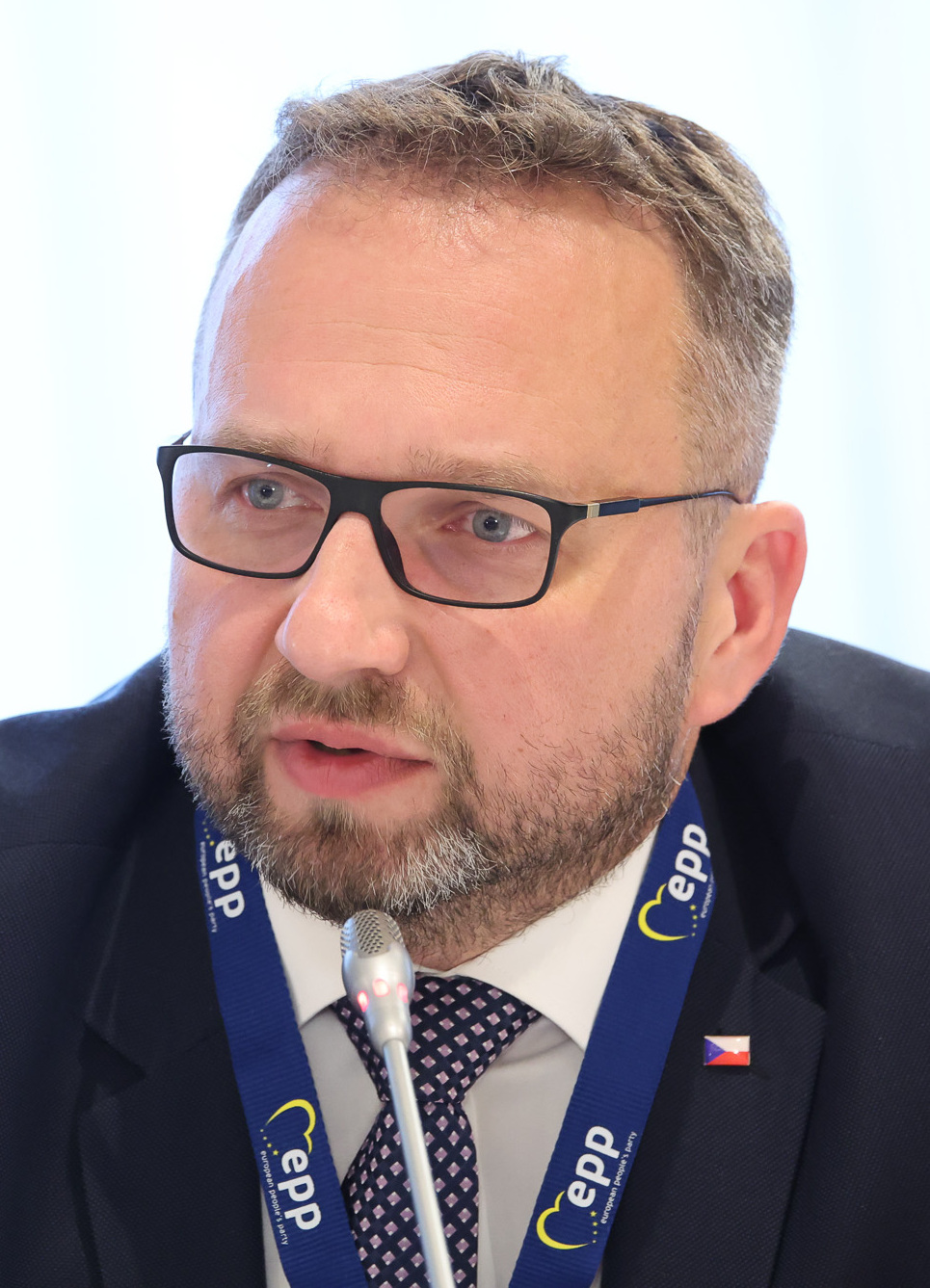
- Jurečka in 2025

Leader of KDU-ČSL
- In office 25 January 2020 – 18 October 2024
- Preceded by: Marek Výborný
- Succeeded by: Marek Výborný

Deputy Prime Minister of the Czech Republic
- In office 17 December 2021 – 15 December 2025
- Prime Minister: Petr Fiala

Minister of Labour and Social Affairs
- In office 17 December 2021 – 15 December 2025
- Prime Minister: Petr Fiala
- Preceded by: Jana Maláčová
- Succeeded by: Aleš Juchelka

Minister of Agriculture
- In office 17 December 2021 – 3 January 2022
- Prime Minister: Petr Fiala
- Preceded by: Miroslav Toman
- Succeeded by: Zdeněk Nekula
- In office 29 January 2014 – 13 December 2017
- Prime Minister: Bohuslav Sobotka
- Preceded by: Miroslav Toman
- Succeeded by: Jiří Milek

Minister of the Environment
- In office 1 November 2022 – 10 March 2023
- Prime Minister: Petr Fiala
- Preceded by: Anna Hubáčková
- Succeeded by: Petr Hladík

Minister of Regional Development
- In office 30 September 2024 – 7 October 2024
- Prime Minister: Petr Fiala
- Preceded by: Ivan Bartoš
- Succeeded by: Petr Kulhánek

1st Vice-Chairman of KDU-ČSL
- In office 16 December 2011 – 29 March 2019
- Preceded by: Petr Šilar
- Succeeded by: Šárka Jelínková

Member of the Chamber of Deputies
- Incumbent
- Assumed office 26 October 2013

Personal details
- Born: 15 March 1981 (age 45) Přerov, Czechoslovakia (now Czech Republic)
- Party: KDU-ČSL
- Other political affiliations: Spolu (since 2020)
- Education: Mendel University Brno

Marian Jurečka (born 15 March 1981) is a Czech politician, who served as Deputy Prime Minister and Minister of Labour and Social Affairs from 17 December 2021 to 15 December 2025 and Minister of the Environment from November 2022 to March 2023, both in the cabinet of Petr Fiala. He was previously the Minister of Agriculture in the cabinet of Bohuslav Sobotka from 2014 to 2017.

== Political career ==
=== 2011-14: Vice-chair of KDU-ČSL ===
In December 2011, Jurečka became first vice-chairman of the KDU-ČSL after the resignation of Petr Šilar. He was elected to the Olomouc Regional assembly for the party one year later. Running together with Mayors of the Olomouc Region, KDU-ČSL finished third with eight seats. Jurečka resigned his seat due to time constraints in March 2015.

At the KDU-ČSL congress in Olomouc in June 2013, Jurečka was re-elected as first vice-chairman of the party, receiving 183 votes from delegates.

In the 2013 parliamentary election, Jurečka was elected in the Olomouc region as the lead candidate on the KDU-ČSL list. While Pavel Bělobrádek was serving as deputy chair of the Chamber of Deputies, Jurečka temporarily replaced him from 3 December 2013 until 14 February 2014 as chair of the KDU-ČSL parliamentary group.

=== 2014-17: Minister of Agriculture ===
On 29 January 2014, Jurečka was appointed as Minister of Agriculture in the cabinet of Bohuslav Sobotka. One month later, he resigned as chair of the KDU-ČSL parliamentary group and was replaced by Jiří Mihola.

In the 2014 municipal elections, Jurečka was elected as a representative of Rokytnice. Originally place last on the KDU-ČSL candidate list, he finished sixth due to preferential votes. He gave up his mandate after the election.

At the May 2015 congress in Zlín, Jurečka was elected for the third time as KDU-ČSL first vice-chair, receiving 148 out of 278 votes with 100 votes being invalid. He defeated Miroslav Rovenský, who received 30 votes. For the 2016 regional elections, Jurečka was listed 55th on the party's candidate list, but moved to fourth place due to preferential votes.

At the KDU-ČSL congress on 27 May 2017, Jurečka won the election for first vice-chair over the head of the Brno branch, Jiří Mihola. In the 2017 parliamentary election, Jurečka received 5,889 preferential votes, and was thus re-elected to the Chamber of Deputies. After the election, he was replaced as Minister of Agriculture by Jiří Milek.

=== 2019–2020: Chairman of KDU-ČSL ===
In March 2019, Jurečka announced that he would run for the post of party chairman at the KDU-ČSL congress. However, he was defeated by Marek Výborný in the second round by 256 votes to 124. Jurečka later decided against running for the presidency of the party.

Following the resignation of Výborný from KDU-ČSL on 25 January 2020, Jurečka ran for party chairman again, beating Jan Bartošek and MEP Tomáš Zdechovský. At the extraordinary convention held on the same day, Jurečka was elected party chairman, receiving 205 votes.

=== 2021–2022: Return to cabinet ===
At the 2021 Czech parliamentary election, Jurečka was for the third time elected in the Olomouc region as the lead candidate on the KDU-ČSL list.

In November 2021, was put forward as the KDU-ČSL candidate for the post of Deputy Prime Minister, as well as Minister of Labor and Social Affairs in the cabinet of Petr Fiala. Between 17 December 2021 and 3 January 2022, Jurečka briefly served as acting Minister of Agriculture, as Zdeněk Nekula tested positive for COVID-19 and could not be sworn in.

At the KDU-ČSL congress in April 2022, Jurečka defended the position of party chairman unopposed, winning 81% of the delegates' votes.

In October 2022, Miloš Zeman was due to appoint Petr Hladík as Environment Minister, effective 1 November. However, KDU-ČSL did not propose him due to a scandal connected with apartments in Brno, leading Jurečka to be appointed acting Environment Minister, only as long as necessary. When Hladík was finally nominated to the position at the end of December 2022, Zeman refused to appoint him, and Jurečka thus remained in office until the inauguration of Petr Pavel as president.

== Personal life ==
Jurečka is married with five sons.
