= 2022 KDU–ČSL leadership election =

Czech political party leadership election

- 23 April 2022
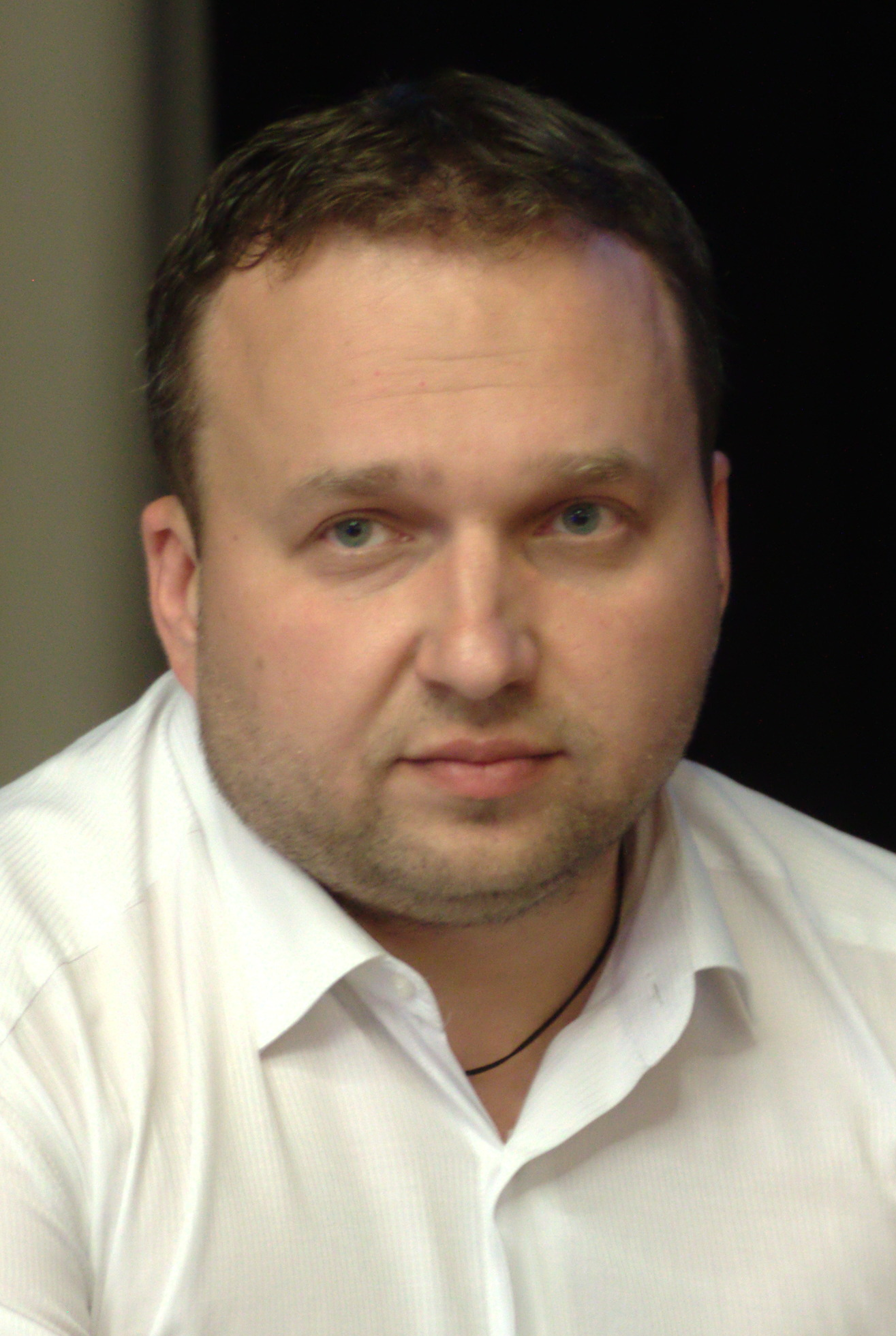
Candidate	Marian Jurečka
Electoral vote	224
Percentage	81%
leader of KDU-ČSL before election
Marian Jurečka
Elected leader of KDU-ČSL
Marian Jurečka

A leadership election for KDU-ČSL was held on 23 April 2022 after 2021 Czech parliamentary election. Marian Jurečka was reelected for second term.

== Voting ==
Election was held on 23 April 2022. Jurečka was the only candidate. He received 224 votes of 275. 30 delegates abstained, 14 voted against while, 7 votes were invalid.

Candidate	Votes	
Marian Jurečka	224	81.45%
Abstained	30	10.91%
Against	14	5.09%
Invalid	7	2.55%
Turnout	275	
