= Petr Kulhánek =

Czech politician

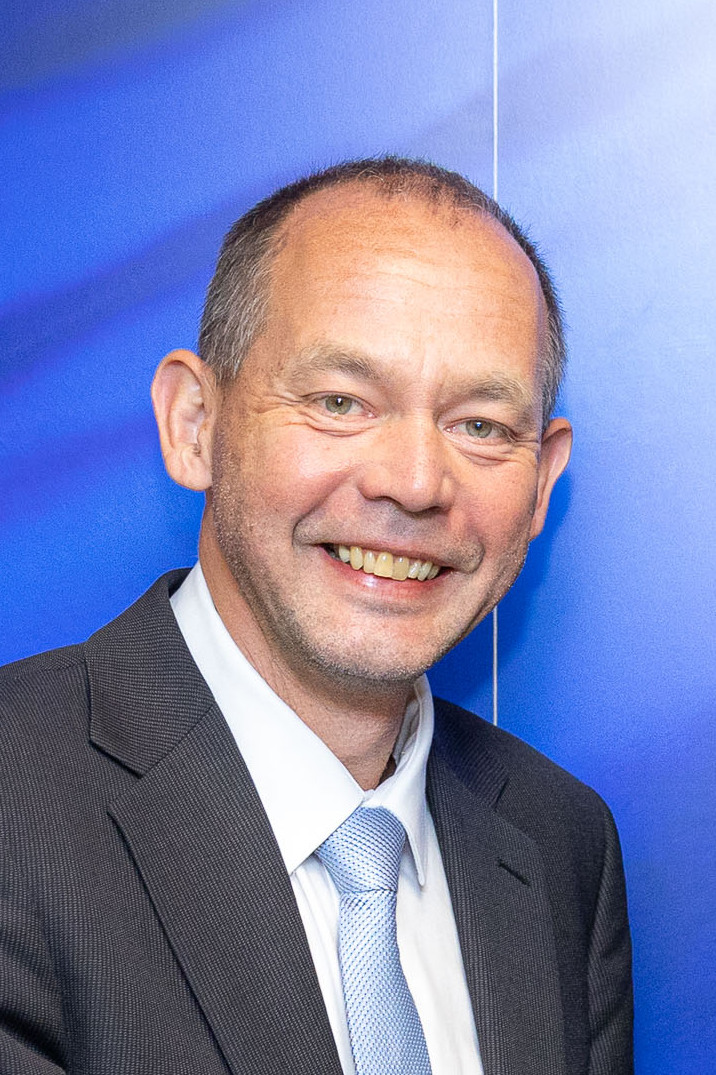
- Kulhánek in 2025

Minister of Regional Development
- In office 8 October 2024 – 15 December 2025
- Prime Minister: Petr Fiala
- Preceded by: Marian Jurečka
- Succeeded by: Zuzana Mrázová

Governor of Karlovy Vary Region
- Incumbent
- Assumed office 14 December 2020
- Preceded by: Petr Kubis

Mayor of Karlovy Vary
- In office 12 November 2010 – 13 November 2018
- Preceded by: Werner Hauptmann
- Succeeded by: Andrea Pfeffer Ferklová

Personal details
- Born: 14 April 1971 (age 55) Karlovy Vary, Czechoslovakia
- Party: Karlovarská občanská alternativa (2006–present); Independent (nominated by Mayors and Independents)
- Education: Prague University of Economics and Business
- Occupation: Politician
- Website: petrkulhanek.cz

Petr Kulhánek (born 14 April 1971) is a Czech politician who served as Minister of Regional Development in the Cabinet of Petr Fiala from October 2024 to December 2025. He has served as Governor of Karlovy Vary Region since December 2020. He was previously the Mayor of Karlovy Vary from 2010 to 2018.
