= Zdeněk Nekula =

Czech politician

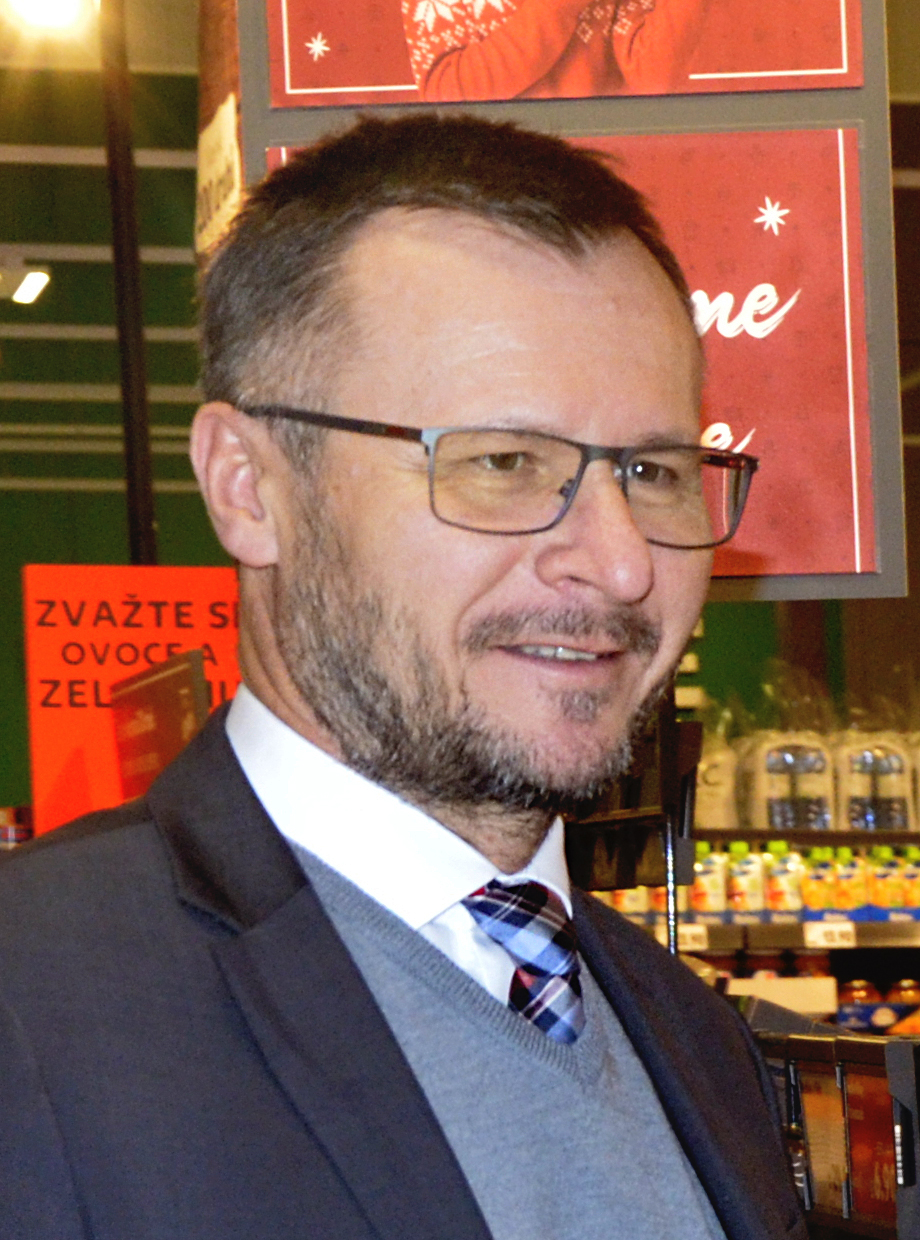
- Nekula in 2022

Minister of Agriculture
- In office 3 January 2022 – 28 June 2023
- Prime Minister: Petr Fiala
- Preceded by: Miroslav Toman
- Succeeded by: Marek Výborný

Mayor of Těšetice
- In office 1 November 2018 – 31 December 2021
- Preceded by: Jana Bezrouková
- Succeeded by: Pavel Worbis
- In office 12 March 2007 – 3 November 2014
- Preceded by: Leoš Musil
- Succeeded by: Jindřich Žižka

Personal details
- Born: 9 February 1970 (age 56) Znojmo, Czechoslovakia
- Party: KDU-ČSL (2007 – present)
- Education: Mendel University Brno

Zdeněk Nekula (born 9 February 1970) is a Czech politician and manager, who served as the Czech Minister of Agriculture in the Cabinet of Petr Fiala from January 2022 until June 2023.

== Early life ==
Between 2015 and 2019, Nekula represented the Ministry of Agriculture of the Czech Republic as a member of the supervisory board in the joint-stock company Exportní garanční a pojišťováci společnost (EGAP). From November 2015 until 2018, he was the chairman of the board of the joint-stock company PGRLF (Poťódníkný a garancí rolnický a lesnický fond), which distributes funds within the framework of support programs in the field of agriculture. An avid beekeeper, Nekula has been a member of the Czech Beekeepers' Association since 2005.

== Political career ==
=== Early political career ===
In the 2006 Czech municipal elections, Nekula was elected as a non-party member of KDU-ČSL as a representative of Těšetice, later becoming mayor of the municipality.

In the 2008 Czech regional elections, Nekula did not for the South Moravian Regional Representative for the KDU-CŠL and was only elected in the 2012 elections. He also ran for the office in 2016, but failed to defend the position again.

In the 2010 Czech parliamentary election, Nekula defended the post of municipal representative as the leader of the KDU-ČSL candidate, becoming mayor for the second time in November.

Nekula became a representative of the municipality in the 2014 Czech Senate election, but did not ran his position as mayor.

In the 2018 Czech Senate election, Nekula was elected as a representative from the position as leader of KDU-ČSL. At the beginning of November, he was elected mayor of the municipality for the third time.

=== 2021: Cabinet of Petr Fiala ===
Near the end of 2021, Nekula resigned as deputy mayor due to his appointment as Minister of Agriculture, but would continue to work the former position. Nekula was supposed to be appointed to the position on 17 December 2021, but could not be sworn in after being tested positive for the COVID-19 and was temporarily replaced by Marian Jurečka. Nekula was appointed on 3 January 2022.

On 14 June 2023, Nekula announced his resignation as Minister of Agriculture at the end of June and was succeeded by the former KDU-ČSL chairman Marek Výborný. According to Seznam Zprávy, he was supposed to call the delegates "schizophrenics who do not know what they want" and leave the hall angrily. On 26 June 2023, President Petr Pavel accepted Nekula's resignation.
