= Petr Macinka =

Czech politician (born 1978)

Petr Macinka MP
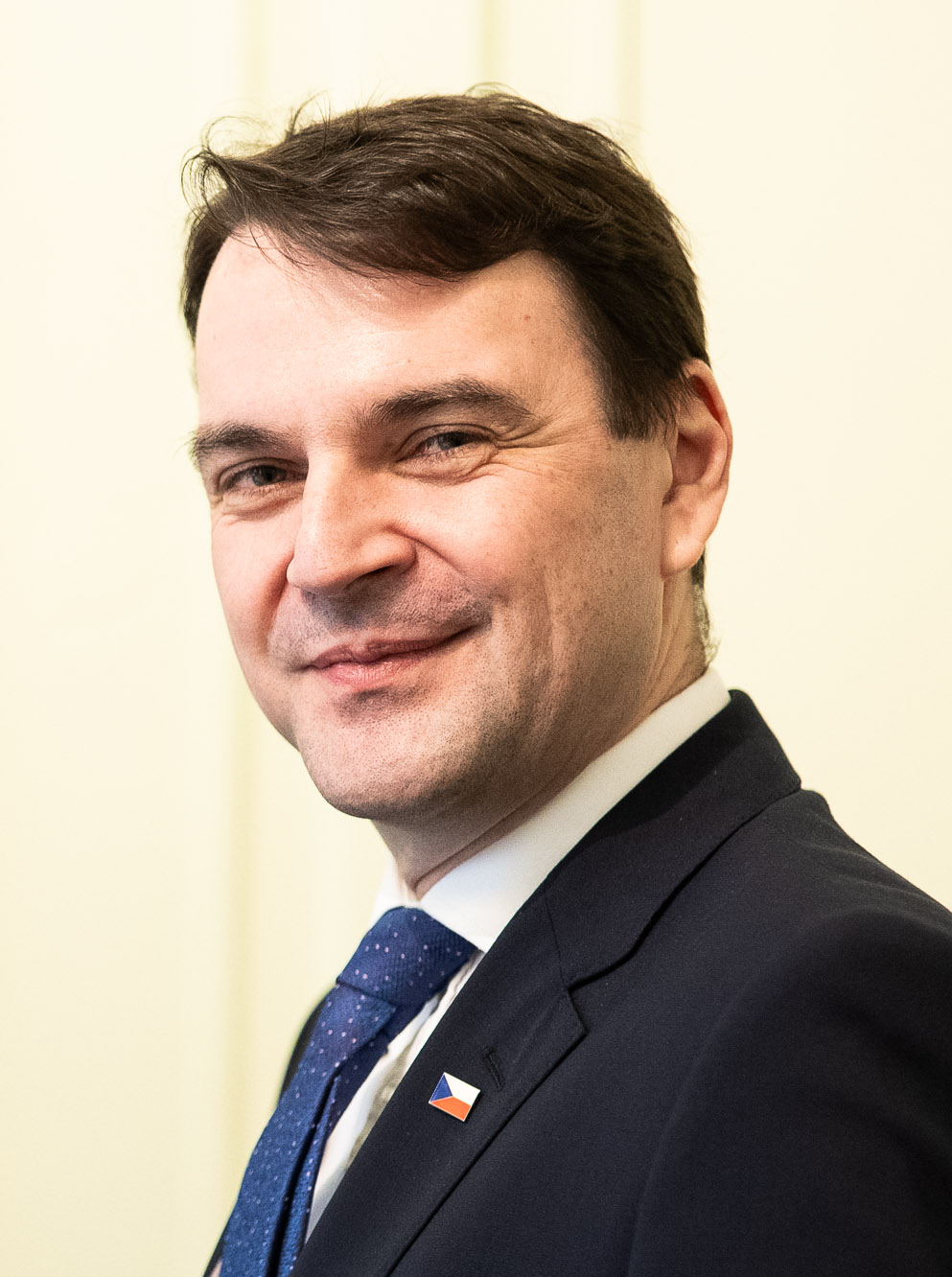
- Macinka in 2026

Deputy Prime Minister of the Czech Republic
- Incumbent
- Assumed office 15 December 2025
- Prime Minister: Andrej Babiš

Minister of Foreign Affairs
- Incumbent
- Assumed office 15 December 2025
- Prime Minister: Andrej Babiš
- Preceded by: Jan Lipavský

Minister of the Environment
- Acting; 15 December 2025 – 23 February 2026
- Prime Minister: Andrej Babiš
- Preceded by: Petr Hladík
- Succeeded by: Igor Červený

Leader of Motorists for Themselves
- Incumbent
- Assumed office 20 May 2022
- Preceded by: Position established

Member of the Chamber of Deputies
- Incumbent
- Assumed office 3 November 2025

Personal details
- Born: 18 August 1978 (age 48) Hodonín, Czechoslovakia
- Party: Motorists for Themselves
- Education: CEVRO University
- Occupation: Politician
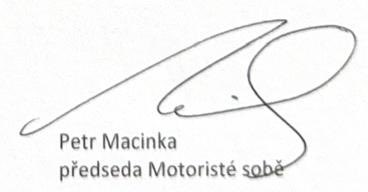
- Signature

Petr Macinka (born 18 August 1978) is a Czech politician and former presidential spokesperson who has served as Deputy Prime Minister of the Czech Republic and Minister of Foreign Affairs since December 2025, in the third cabinet of Andrej Babiš. He has been the leader of the Czech political party Motorists for Themselves since 2022, and was elected as an MP in the 2025 Czech parliamentary election. Macinka served as the Minister of the Environment from December 2025 to February 2026. A long-time ally of former Czech President Václav Klaus, he previously served as a spokesman at the Václav Klaus Institute and as deputy director of the Presidential Press Department.

== Early life and career ==
Macinka was born in Hodonín in 1978. He studied political science and international relations at the private CEVRO Institute, obtaining a master's degree in 2013. From 2008 to 2013, he worked as deputy director of the press department in the office of the president under Václav Klaus.

== Political career ==
In 2022, Macinka took over a dormant minor party and rebranded it as Motoristé sobě (English: Motorists for Themselves). The party first ran in the 2022 Prague municipal elections on a platform opposing bicycle lanes and promoting free public transport for motorists. Although it failed to pass the electoral threshold in Prague, it gained media attention for its anti-green and populist rhetoric.

In 2024, Macinka led the party into a coalition with Přísaha for the 2024 European Parliament election. The coalition won 10.26% of the vote and gained two seats, one of which went to the Motorists' election leader Filip Turek. Following the election, the party grew in national profile. At its first congress in late 2024, Macinka was re-elected leader, and Turek was appointed honorary president.

Ahead of the 2025 Czech parliamentary election, Macinka declared that the party aimed to enter the national parliament and overtake the Civic Democratic Party (ODS). He expressed openness to forming a coalition with ANO 2011, while rejecting any cooperation with left-wing parties. In the election, the Motorists received 6.8% of the vote and won seats in the Chamber of Deputies for the first time, with Macinka among the MPs elected in the South Moravian Region.

=== Minister of Foreign Affairs ===
In January 2026, Macinka reaffirmed support for Ukraine during a visit to Kyiv, stating that the Czech Republic advocates for diplomatic efforts to end the war while supporting continued ammunition supplies.

During talks with Israeli Foreign Minister Gideon Sa'ar on 20 January 2026, Macinka expressed support for a Gaza ceasefire.

== Views ==
In 2025 Macinka expressed that he was opposed to a referendum on Czech withdrawal from the European Union. He also opposes adoption of the Euro, same-sex marriage, progressive taxation, and the EU's 2035 phase-out of fossil fuel vehicles, which he called "industrial self-destruction".

His potential nomination to the ministry of environment sparked several protests in Prague and other cities in the Czech Republic. On 15 December 2025, after he was inaugurated as the interim head of the environment ministry, Macinka said: "I would like to reassure the Czech public and all ordinary citizens and tell you that the climate crisis in the Czech Republic is over as of today".

Macinka expressed support for relocating the Czech embassy in Israel from Tel Aviv to Jerusalem, stating it should have been done earlier. Speaking at a Hanukkah event in Prague's Palach Square, he called for greater Czech solidarity with Israel and Jewish communities worldwide, as well as condemning the recent anti-Semitic mass shooting at Bondi Beach in Sydney.

Following the 2026 United States intervention in Venezuela, Macinka called for the de-escalation of regional tensions through diplomatic channels. He advocated for a negotiated settlement that included the Venezuelan opposition to ensure national stability.

== Controversies ==
=== Inflammatory language ===
In April 2026, Macinka wrote to the Czech News Agency that he considered the nonprofit environmental organization Hnutí DUHA, without exaggeration, to be a terrorist organization. In response, the organization called on Macinka to publicly apologise and sent a pre-trial notice, saying it would sue if he did not. On 24 June 2026, the group filed a lawsuit, as Macinka had not apologised.

On 8 November 2026, during a debate on Prima TV, Macinka gave his opinion about women's ice hockey, stating that he considered hockey "a men's sport" and describing the players of the Russian women's national ice hockey team as "Russian mannish women". He added that "feminist pressure for equality has led to women playing ice hockey, but I don't really consider it a women's sport". Macinka's fellow guest in the studio, former foreign minister Jan Lipavský, called his statement disgusting and chauvinistic. MEP Danuše Nerudová, former Minister for Science Marek Ženíšek and Government Commissioner for Human Rights Taťána Malá criticized Macinka's statement as sexist, boorish, embarrassing, disrespectful to women, and a display of arrogance and a sense of superiority. Czech NHL players Adam Klapka, Martin Nečas and Lukáš Dostál also criticised Macinka's comments on their social media. A day later, after a government meeting, Macinka apologized for his statement, and said he had called the manager of the Czechia women's national ice hockey team to apologize.
