= Michal Šalomoun =

Czech politician (born 1974)

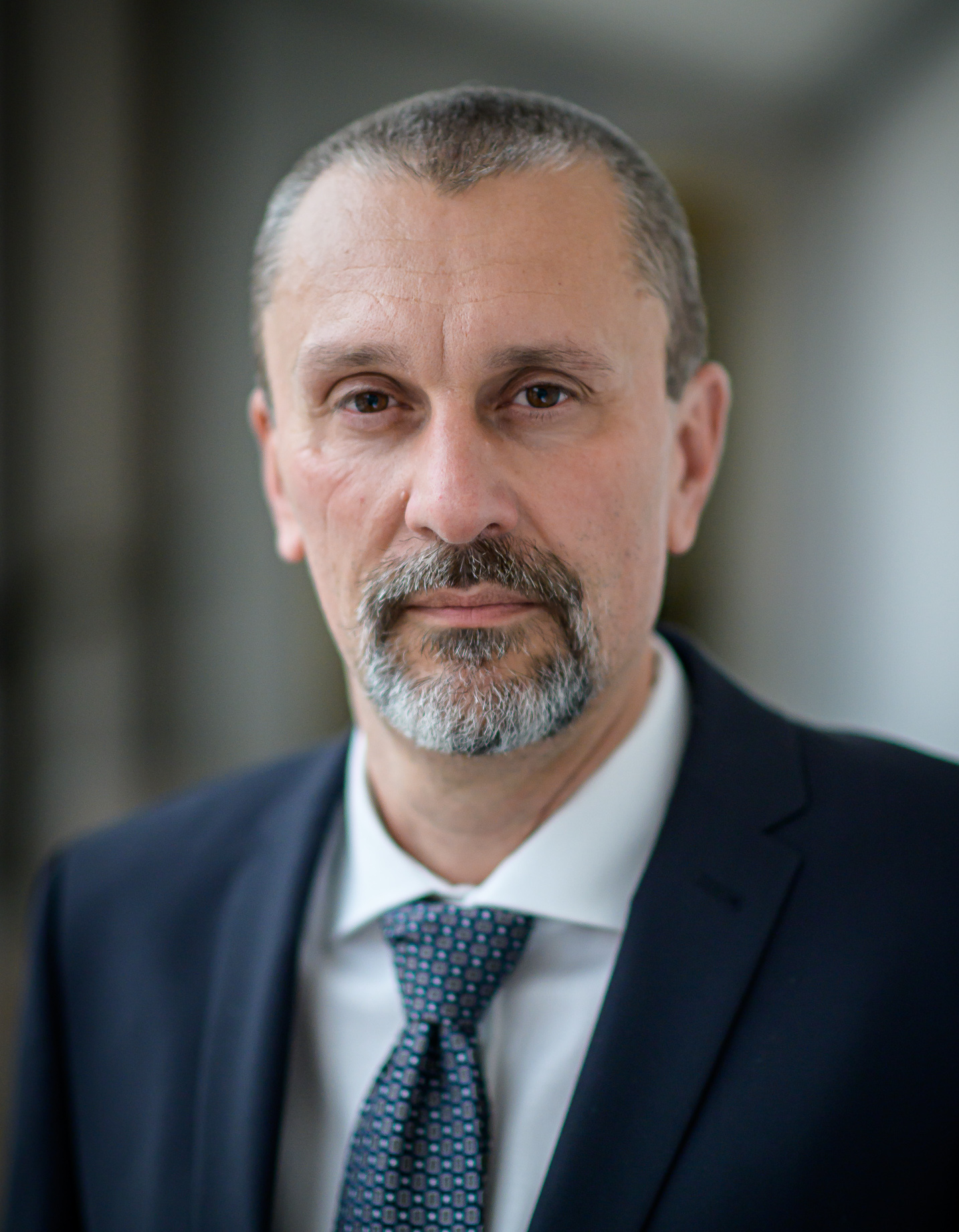
- Šalomoun in 2021

Minister of Legislation and chairman of the Government Legislative Council
- In office 17 December 2021 – 11 October 2024
- Prime Minister: Petr Fiala
- Preceded by: Marie Benešová

Personal details
- Born: 21 October 1974 (age 51) Třebíč, Czechoslovakia
- Party: Independent (nominated by Czech Pirate Party)
- Education: Masaryk University; Janáček Academy of Music and Performing Arts
- Occupation: Lawyer, Politician

Michal Šalomoun (born 21 October 1974) is a Czech lawyer and politician who served as Czech Minister of Legislation and chairman of the Government Legislative Council in the Cabinet of Petr Fiala from December 2021 to October 2024, nominated by the Czech Pirate Party.
