= Marek Výborný =

Czech politician (born 1976)

Marek Výborný MP
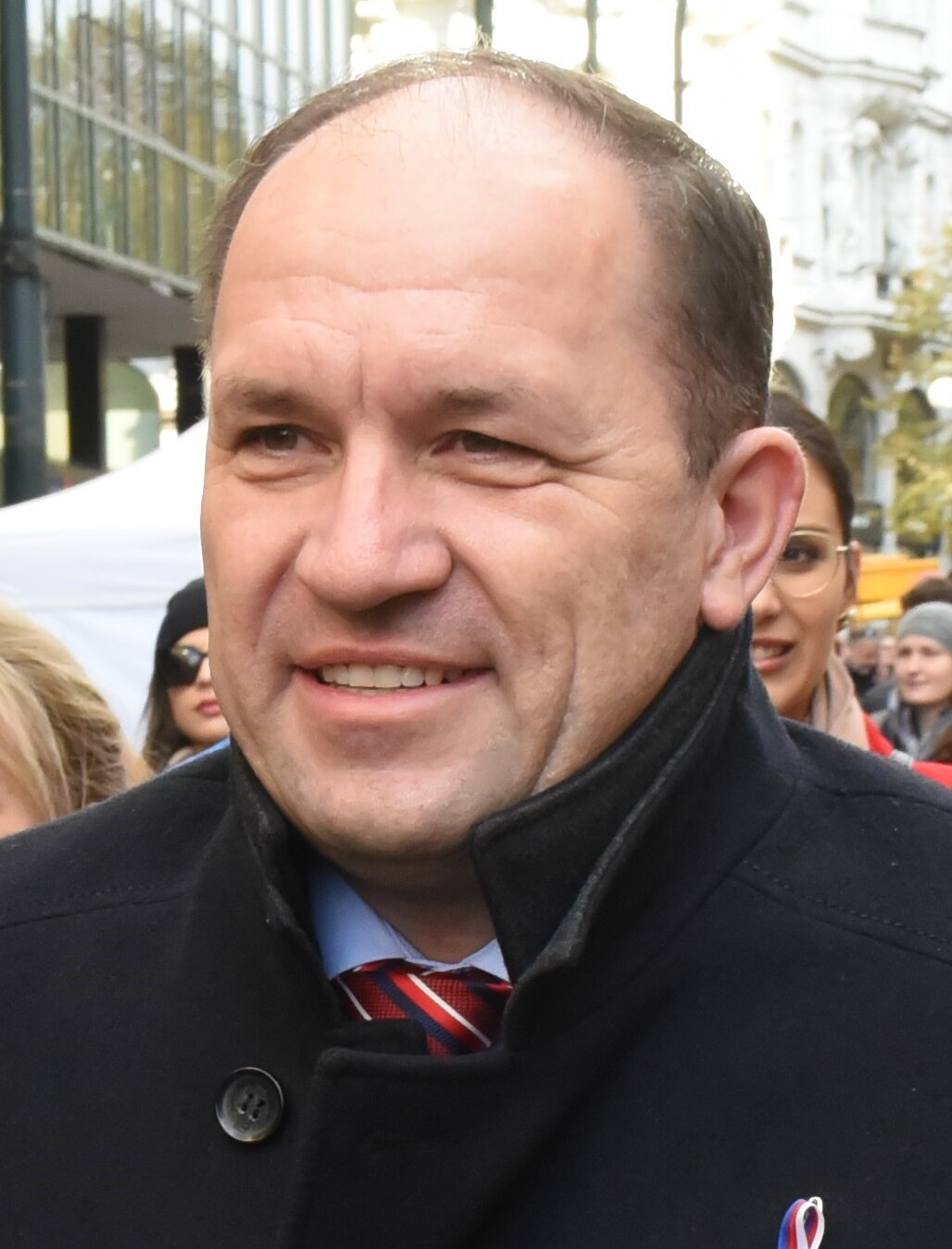
- Výborný in 2023

Minister of Agriculture
- In office 29 June 2023 – 15 December 2025
- Prime Minister: Petr Fiala
- Preceded by: Zdeněk Nekula
- Succeeded by: Martin Šebestyán

Leader of KDU–ČSL
- In office 29 March 2019 – 25 January 2020
- Preceded by: Pavel Bělobrádek
- Succeeded by: Marian Jurečka
- In office 18 October 2024 – 24 April 2026
- Preceded by: Marian Jurečka
- Succeeded by: Jan Grolich

Member of the Chamber of Deputies
- Incumbent
- Assumed office 21 October 2017

Personal details
- Born: 10 July 1976 (age 50) Heřmanův Městec, Czechoslovakia (now the Czech Republic)
- Party: KDU–ČSL
- Education: Palacký University Olomouc

Marek Výborný (born 10 July 1976) is a Czech politician, who served as the Czech Minister of Agriculture in Cabinet of Petr Fiala from 2023 to 2025. He served as the leader of KDU-ČSL from October 2024 to April 2026. He was also the leader of KDU-ČSL between 2019 and 2020. Výborný resigned on the post on 19 November 2019 after his wife died and he became a single parent for his three children. He left the position on 25 January 2020.

== Personal life ==
Výborný studied history and theology at Palacký University in Olomouc. Then in 2001 he started at Gymnázium, Pardubice, Mozartova 449, teaching history, basics of social sciences and Latin. From 1 August 2012 until 31 March 2018 he was director of the Mozart Grammar School. Since October 2017 he has been a member of the Chamber of Deputies of the Parliament of the Czech Republic for KDU-ČSL.

Marek Výborný is a widower and has three children. His wife Markéta died in 2019. He lives in the town of Heřmanův Městec in the Pardubice region. In his free time he likes to go to the bike ranges of Železné hory (he also chooses the road variant depending on time) or runs around Heřmanův Městec. He provides acolyte services in his home parish in Heřmanův Městec and is an active member of the Czech Christian Academy. He is also chairman of the "Music Summer in St. Bartholomew" festival organizing committee.

Výborný acts as the executive of Vlastislav Heřmanův Městec. He is also a member of a scout organization and has been a coach of the TJ Jiskra HM children's club for several years.

His father is former Minister and Judge of the Constitutional Court, Miloslav Výborný.

== Political career ==
Since 2005 he has been a member of KDU-ČSL. He is a member of the local organization Heřmanův Městec; Deputy Chairman of the District Committee of the KDU-ČSL Chrudim, a member of the Regional Committee of the KDU-ČSL and a member of the National Commission for Education and the Legislative Commission of the KDU-ČSL.

In the municipal elections in 2006, he was elected a representative of the city of Heřmanův Městec for the KDU-ČSL and independent, and four years later, in his elections in 2010, his representative mandate was defended. At the same time, he held the post of councilor in the years 2006 to 2014. He succeeded in obtaining the mandate of the city council also in the 2014 elections, but he no longer held the position of councilor. However, he is the chairman of the Commission for Education and Training, a member of the Cultural Commission and a member of the Editorial Board of the Leknín Newsletter and the Leknín TV of Heřmanův Městec. Also in the municipal elections in 2018 he defended the mandate of the city's representative. In the 2004 regional elections, he was still a non-party for the KDU-ČSL on the candidate list of the Coalition for the Pardubice Region (i.e. the KDU-ČSL and US-DEU coalitions) to the Pardubice Region Assembly, but failed. He was no longer able to do so as a member of the KDU-ČSL in the 2008 election, also on the list of the Coalition for the Pardubice Region. He succeeded only in the 2012 elections, again as a member of the KDU-ČSL on the candidate list of the Coalition for the Pardubice Region, where he originally ranked 20th, but ended up third due to preferential votes. However, on 6 November 2012 he resigned from his mandate due to the incompatibility of the functions of the regional representative and the director of the grammar school (replaced by David Šimek). Since 2004, Marek Výborný has been a member of the Committee on Education, Training and Employment within the Pardubice Region.

On 18 October 2024, Výborný was elected chairman of KDU-ČSL the convention in Olomouc, opposed by Marian Jurečka and Jiří Čunek.
