= Aleš Juchelka =

Czech politician, presenter, screenwriter, dramaturge

Aleš Juchelka MP
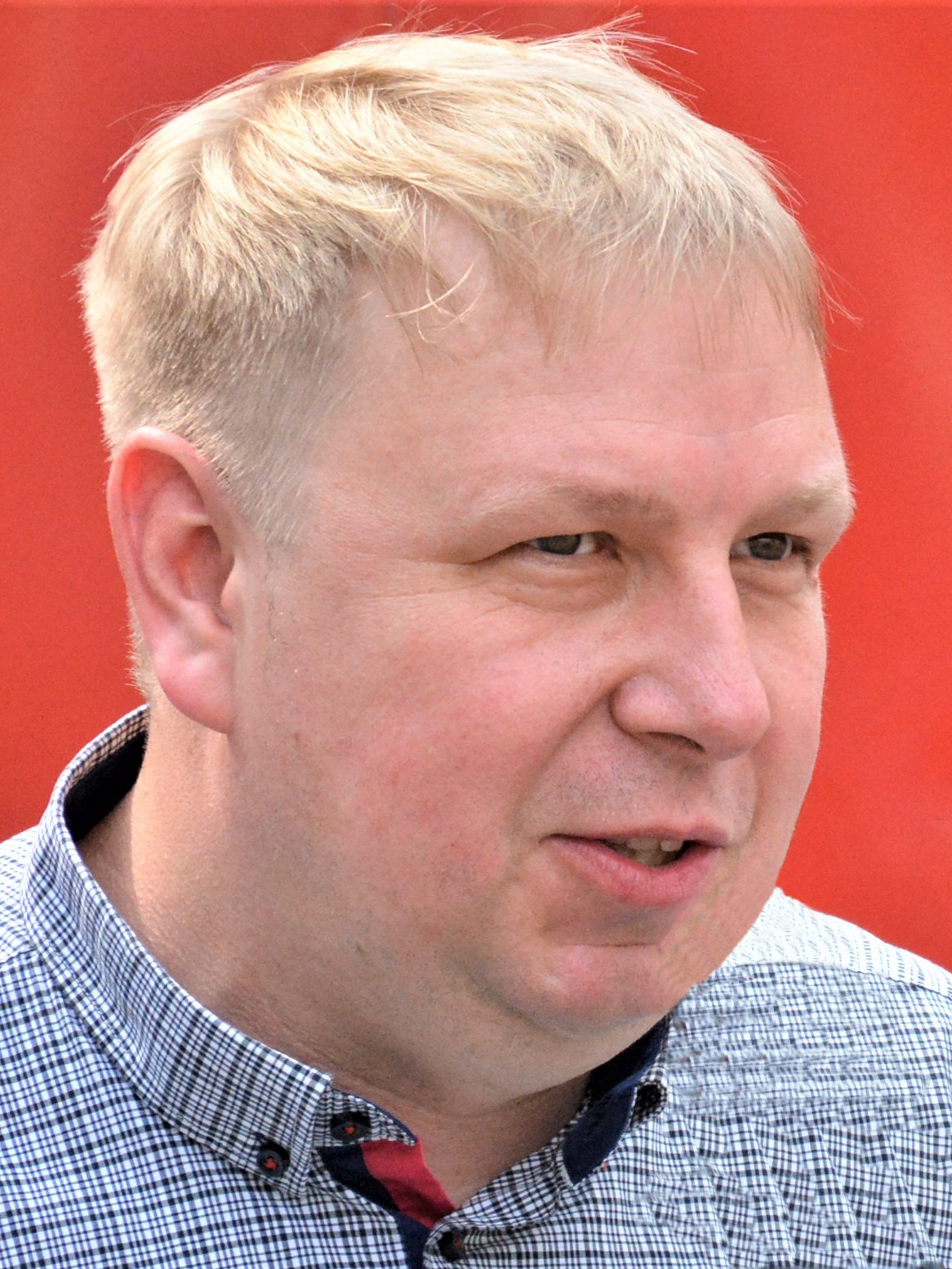
- Juchelka in 2018

Minister of Labour and Social Affairs
- Incumbent
- Assumed office 15 December 2025
- Prime Minister: Andrej Babiš
- Preceded by: Marian Jurečka

Member of the Chamber of Deputies
- Incumbent
- Assumed office 21 October 2017

Personal details
- Born: 18 April 1976 (age 50) Ostrava, Czechoslovakia
- Party: ANO 2011 (2018–present)
- Other political affiliations: TOP 09 (2010–2015)
- Education: VSB
- Occupation: Politician, presenter, screenwriter, dramaturge

Aleš Juchelka (born 18 April 1976) is a Czech politician and former presenter, screenwriter, and dramaturge, who has served as Minister of Labour and Social Affairs in the third cabinet of Andrej Babiš since 15 December 2025. Since October 2017, he has been a member of the Chamber of Deputies of the Czech Republic, elected as an independent for the ANO 2011 movement. Prior to this, from 2010 to 2014, he served as a councilor in the city of Ostrava representing TOP 09.

== Political career ==
In the municipal elections of 2010, he was elected as a councilor of the city of Ostrava, leading the candidate list for TOP 09. He sought reelection as the lead candidate for TOP 09 in the 2014 elections. However, this time he was unsuccessful, as the party did not secure representation in the council. He also did not become a councilor in the Moravská Ostrava and Přívoz municipal district, despite leading the TOP 09 candidate list there.

In the municipal elections of 2018, he ran as a member of the ANO movement for a position in the Moravská Ostrava and Přívoz municipal district council but was unsuccessful.

Similarly, in the 2022 municipal elections, he ran unsuccessfully for a position in the Moravská Ostrava and Přívoz council, occupying the 15th position on the ANO candidate list.

In 2015, he left TOP 09, and in the elections to the Chamber of Deputies of the Czech Republic in 2017, he was elected as an independent for the ANO movement in the Moravian-Silesian Region, occupying the third position on the candidate list.

In the elections to the Chamber of Deputies of the Czech Republic in 2021, he ran for ANO in the third position in the Moravian-Silesian Region. He received 6,080 preferential votes, thus becoming a member of parliament once again.
