= Boris Šťastný =

Czech politician (born 1970)

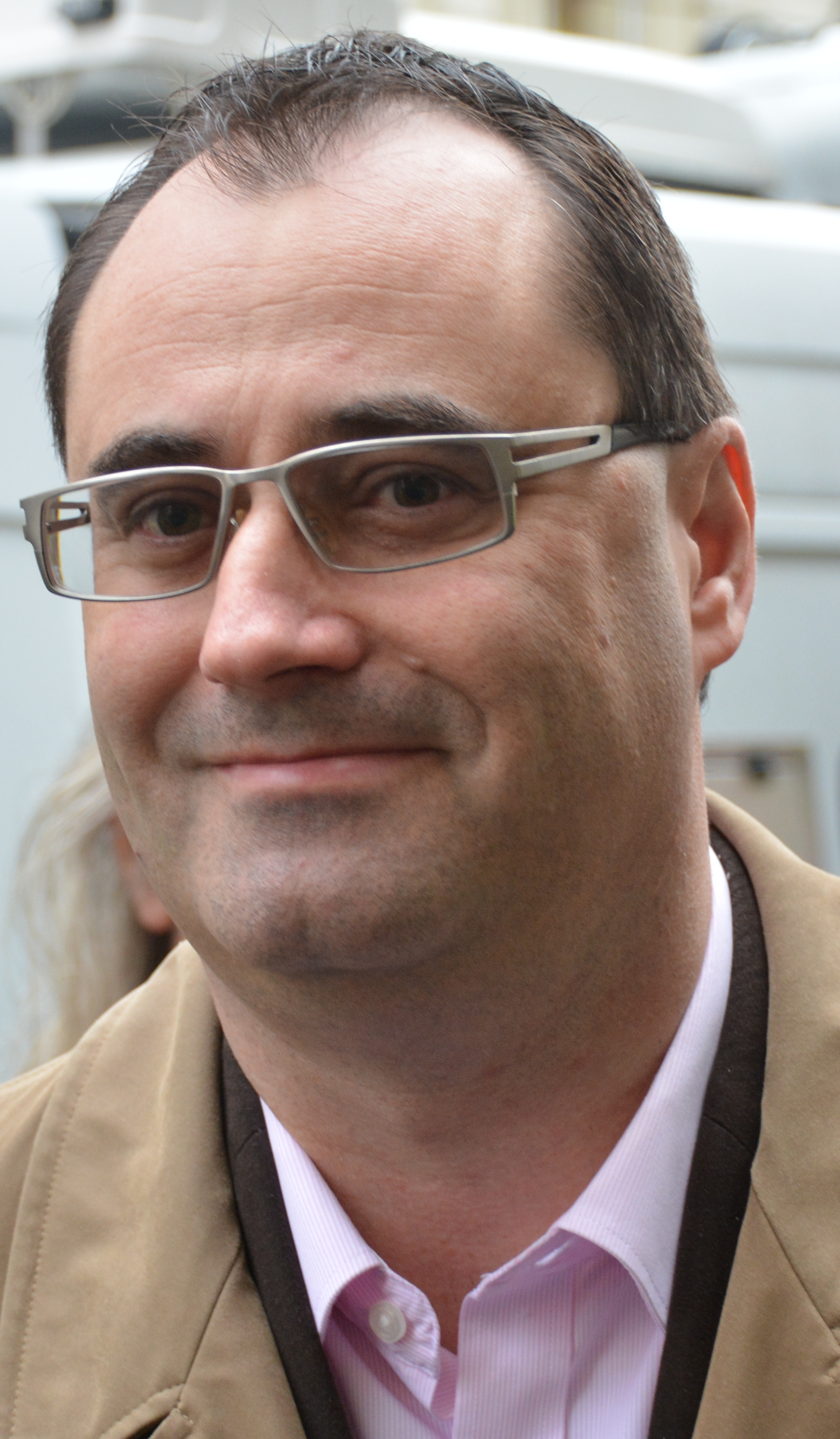
- Šťastný in 2015

Minister for Sports, Prevention, and Health
- Incumbent
- Assumed office 15 December 2025
- Prime Minister: Andrej Babiš
- Preceded by: Position established

Member of the Chamber of Deputies
- Incumbent
- Assumed office 4 October 2025
- Constituency: Prague
- In office 3 June 2006 – 28 August 2013
- Constituency: Prague

Personal details
- Born: 8 April 1970 (age 56) Prague, Czechoslovakia
- Party: AUTO (since 2024)
- Other political affiliations: ODS (1998–2013)
- Education: Charles University

Boris Šťastný (born 8 April 1970) is a Czech politician, who has served as Minister for Sports, Prevention, and Health in the Third cabinet of Andrej Babiš since 15 December 2025. He has been a member of the Chamber of Deputies since 2025, having previously served from 2006 to 2013. He has served as group leader of Motorists for Themselves since 2025.

He was born in Prague. He studied medicine at the Charles University. He has two sons.
