= Osová Bítýška =

- Municipality
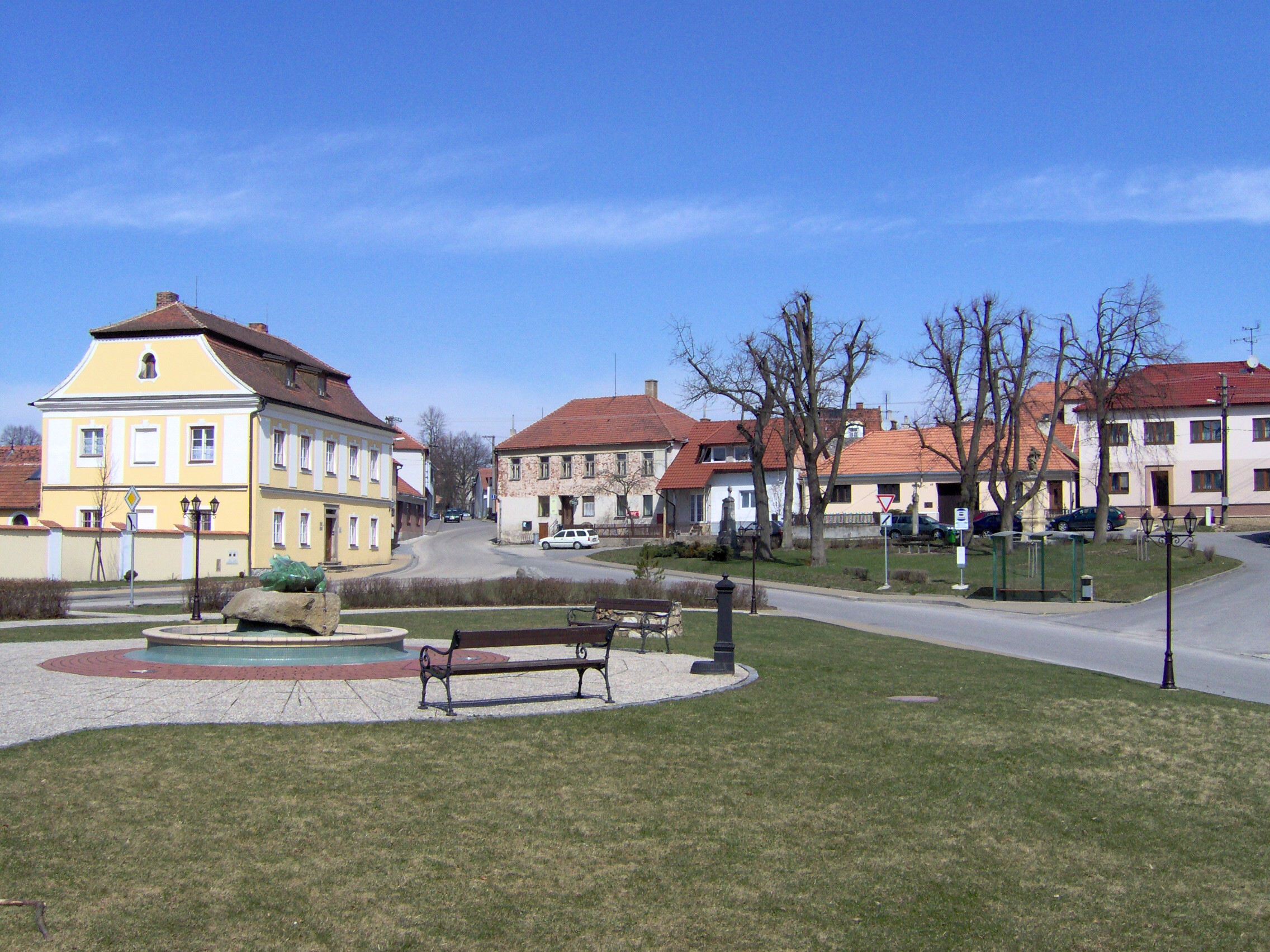
- Centre of Osová Bítýška

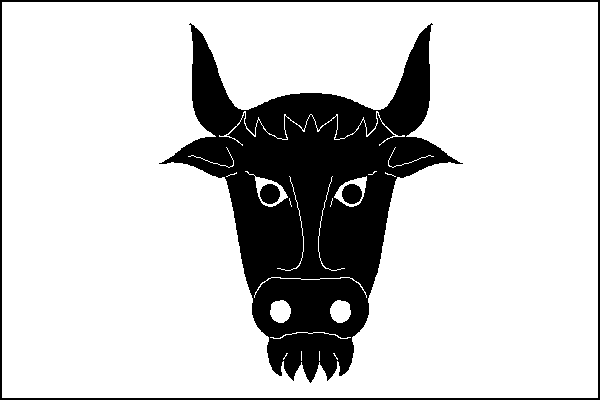
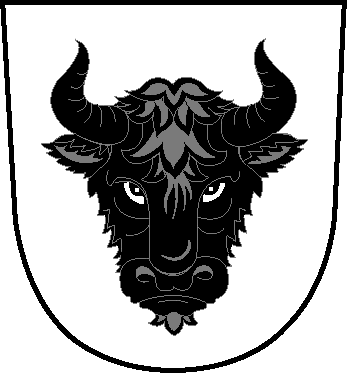
- Flag Coat of arms

- Location in the Czech Republic
- Coordinates: 49°19′30″N 16°10′7″E
- Country: Czech Republic
- Region: Vysočina
- District: Žďár nad Sázavou
- First mentioned: 1264

Area
  - Total: 10.32 km^{2} (3.98 sq mi)
- Elevation: 524 m (1,719 ft)

Population (2026-01-01)
  - Total: 942
  - Density: 91.3/km^{2} (236/sq mi)
- Time zone: UTC+1 (CET)
  - Summer (DST): UTC+2 (CEST)
- Postal code: 594 53
- Website: www.osovabityska.cz

Osová Bítýška is a municipality and village in Žďár nad Sázavou District in the Vysočina Region of the Czech Republic. It has about 900 inhabitants.

== Administrative division ==
Osová Bítýška consists of two municipal parts (in brackets population according to the 2021 census):

- Osová Bítýška (902)
- Osová (33)

== Geography ==
Osová Bítýška is located about 31 kilometres (19 mi) southeast of Žďár nad Sázavou and 33 km (21 mi) northwest of Brno. It lies in the Křižanov Highlands. The highest point is at 582 m (1,909 ft) above sea level. The village of Osová Bítýška is urbanistically fused with Záblatí, from which it is separated by the Bítýška stream. The stream Bílý potok flows through the village of Osová and supplies there a system of fishponds.

== History ==
The first written mention of Osová Bítýška is from 1264, when the village was owned by Eliška of Orphan and the Teutonic Order gained patronage of the local church. In the 1320s, the village was documented as a property of the Lords of Ronov. From 1349 at the latest, Osová Bítýška was a market town. From the 1360s to 1530, the market town was divided into two parts with different owners. In 1530, both parts were bought by the Pernštejn family.

In 1552, the Polcar of Parařov family purchased Osová Bítýška. The market town was divided again in 1581. The larger part of the estate often changed owners, while the smaller part belonged to the Polcar of Parařov family until 1623. The properties of the Polcars of Parařov were confiscated as a result of the Battle of White Mountain and both parts of Osová Bítýška were reunited in 1623 by Jindřich Hozlauer of Hozlau.

From the end of the 17th century to 1708, Osová Bítýška was owned by the Schwanenfeld family. Between 1708 and 1796, the estate was ruled by the Walldorf family. It was then purchased by Count František Kajetán Chorynský of Ledská, who immediately sold it to Count Jindřich Haugwitz of Biskupice. His family were the last noble owners of the market town before the establishment of an independent municipality in 1848.

== Demographics ==
Historical population

Year	Pop.	±%
1869	783	—
1880	716	−8.6%
1890	783	+9.4%
1900	817	+4.3%
1910	838	+2.6%

Year	Pop.	±%
1921	814	−2.9%
1930	806	−1.0%
1950	735	−8.8%
1961	785	+6.8%
1970	838	+6.8%

Year	Pop.	±%
1980	779	−7.0%
1991	801	+2.8%
2001	810	+1.1%
2011	869	+7.3%
2021	935	+7.6%

Source: Censuses

== Transport ==
The I/37 road, which connects the D1 motorway with Žďár nad Sázavou and continues to Pardubice, runs through the municipality.

Osová Bítýška is located on the railway line Hustopeče–Křižanov.

== Sights ==
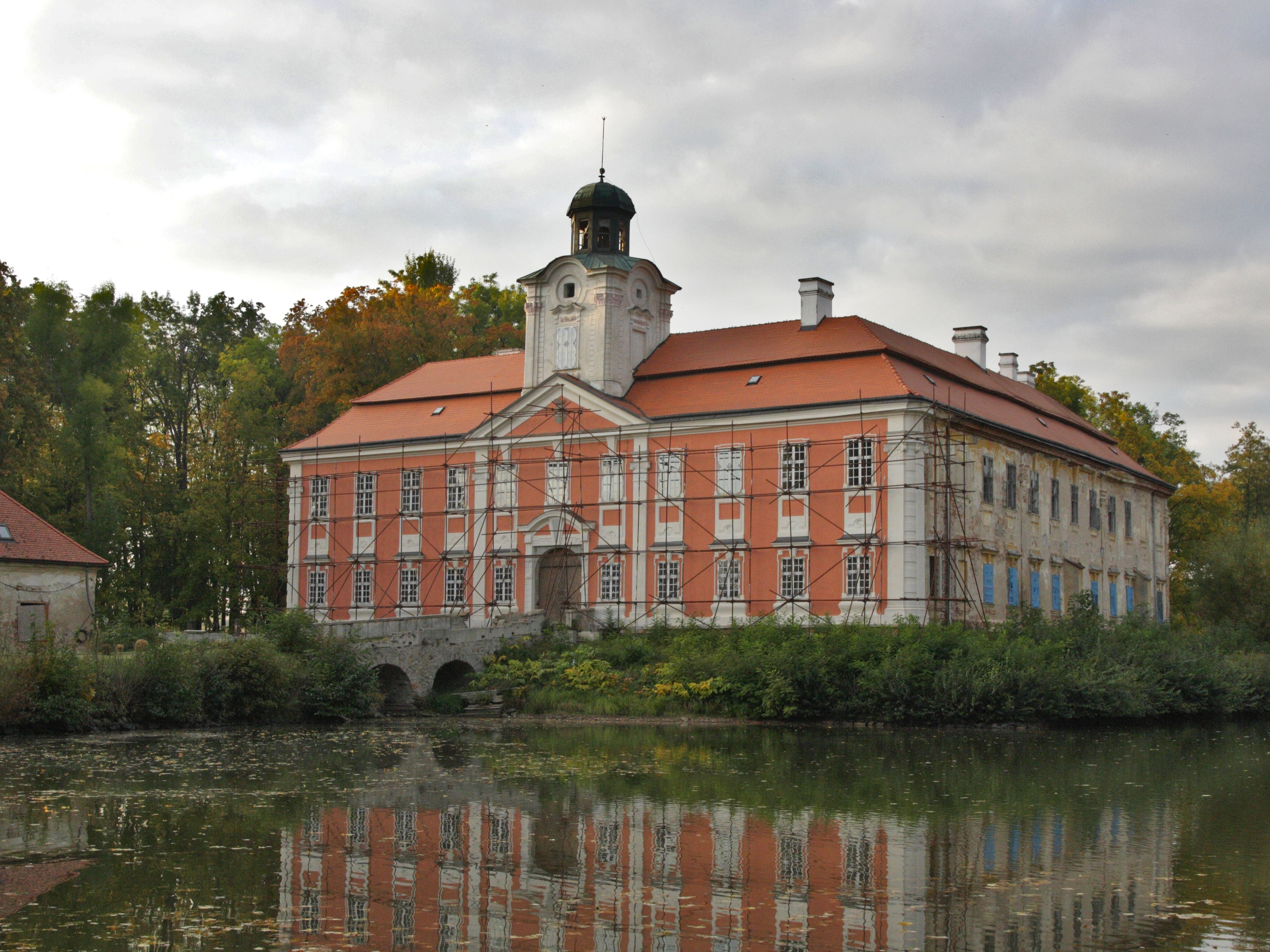
Osová Castle

The main landmark of Osová Bítýška is the Church of Saint James the Great. It was originally a medieval Gothic church, rebuilt in the Baroque style. It was fortified, but only the torso of the wall has survived from the fortifications. Next to the church is a separate bell tower.

The Osová Castle is located in the village of Osová. It was originally a water fortress, built in the early 14th century at the latest. At the beginning of the 18th century, it was rebuilt into a four-winged Baroque castle, and later was modified in the Neoclassical style.

== Notable people ==
- Petr Hladík (born 1984), politician
