= Ratíškovice =

- Municipality
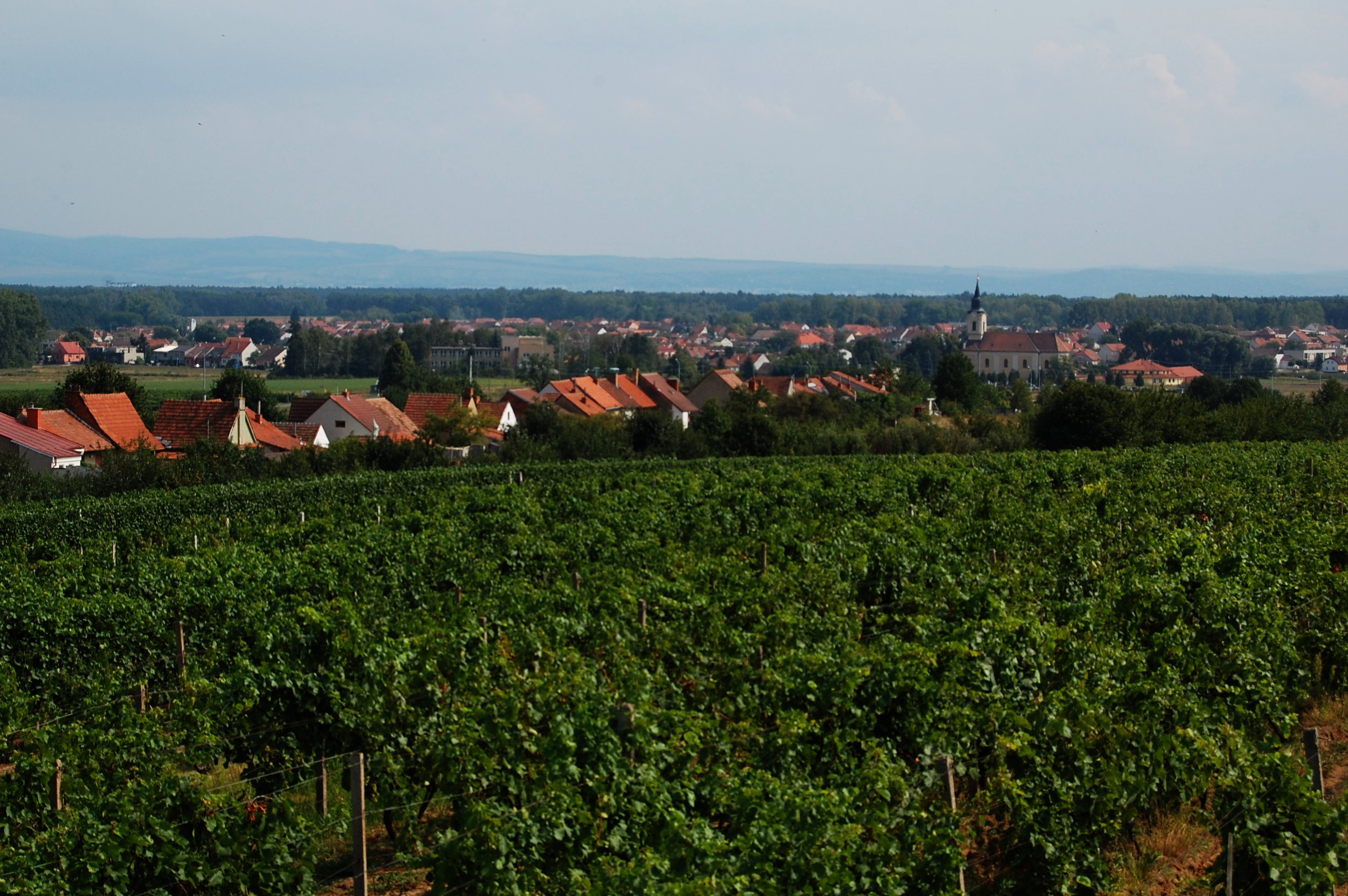
- View of Ratíškovice and nearby vineyards

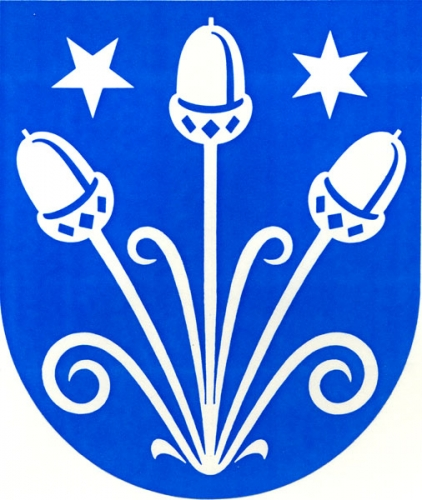
- Flag Coat of arms

- Location in the Czech Republic
- Coordinates: 48°55′12″N 17°9′56″E
- Country: Czech Republic
- Region: South Moravian
- District: Hodonín
- First mentioned: 1141

Area
  - Total: 12.59 km^{2} (4.86 sq mi)
- Elevation: 207 m (679 ft)

Population (2026-01-01)
  - Total: 3,905
  - Density: 310.2/km^{2} (803.3/sq mi)
- Time zone: UTC+1 (CET)
  - Summer (DST): UTC+2 (CEST)
- Postal code: 696 02
- Website: www.ratiskovice.com

Ratíškovice (Czech pronunciation: [ˈraciːʃkovitsɛ]) is a municipality and village in Hodonín District in the South Moravian Region of the Czech Republic. It has about 3,900 inhabitants.

== Geography ==
Ratíškovice is located about 7 kilometres (4 mi) northeast of Hodonín and 49 km (30 mi) southeast of Hodonín. It lies in a flat landscape in the Lower Morava Valley. The highest point is the hill Náklo at 265 m (869 ft) above sea level.

== History ==
The first written mention of Ratíškovice is in a deed of bishop Jindřich Zdík from 1141. It is one of the oldest villages in the area.

People in Ratíškovice were mainly farmers; they used to grow rye, barley, oat, potatoes, corn, millet and hemp. At the end of the 19th century, they started to work in mines in Dubňany and Milotice. From 1934 to 1952, lignite was mined in Tomáš Mine right in Ratíškovice.

== Demographics ==
Historical population

Year	Pop.	±%
1869	1,159	—
1880	1,294	+11.6%
1890	1,447	+11.8%
1900	1,537	+6.2%
1910	1,728	+12.4%

Year	Pop.	±%
1921	1,857	+7.5%
1930	2,142	+15.3%
1950	2,662	+24.3%
1961	3,347	+25.7%
1970	3,627	+8.4%

Year	Pop.	±%
1980	3,909	+7.8%
1991	4,030	+3.1%
2001	4,048	+0.4%
2011	3,925	−3.0%
2021	3,767	−4.0%

Source: Censuses

== Economy ==
Ratíškovice is known for viticulture and winemaking. The municipality lies in the Slovácká wine subregion.

== Transport ==
There are no railways (except an unused spur line from the former coal mine) or major roads passing through the municipality.

== Sport ==
The football club FK Baník Ratíškovice is based in Ratíškovice. It plays in lower amateur tiers.

== Sights ==
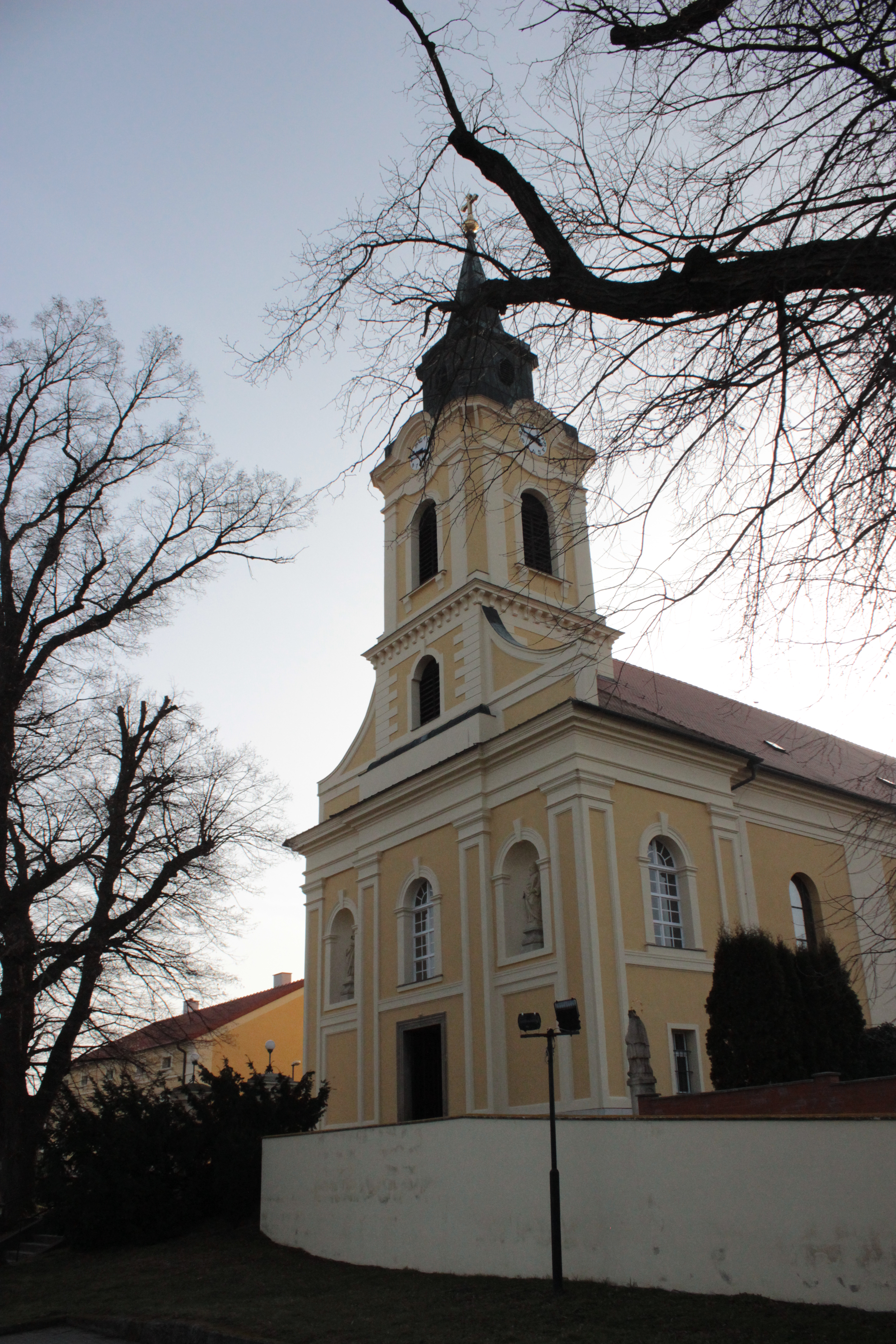
Church of Saints Cyril and Methodius

The most important monument is the Church of Saints Cyril and Methodius. It was built in 1855–1857.

The second protected monument is a statue of Saint John of Nepomuk. It is a late Baroque work dating from 1842.

== Notable people ==
- Josef Vacenovský (1937–2023), footballer
- Anna Hubáčková (born 1957), politician
- Michal Kordula (born 1978), football player and manager

== Twin towns – sister cities ==
Ratíškovice is twinned with:

- Vouziers, France
