= Martin Šebestyán =

Czech manager and agricultural expert (born 1973)

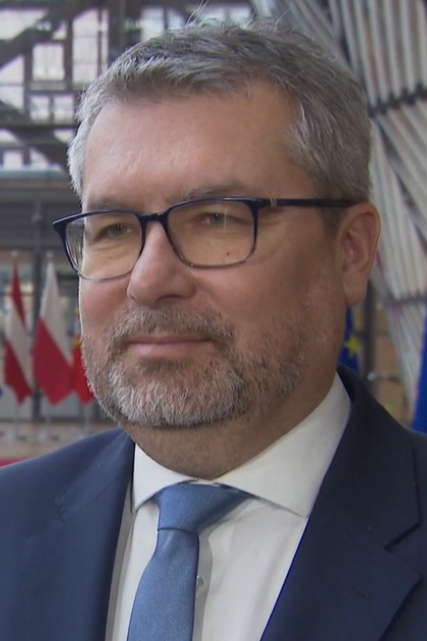
- Šebestyán in 2026

Minister of Agriculture
- Incumbent
- Assumed office 15 December 2025
- Prime Minister: Andrej Babiš
- Preceded by: Marek Výborný

Director General of the State Agricultural Intervention Fund
- In office 31 December 2013 – 31 August 2022
- Succeeded by: Petr Dlouhý

Personal details
- Born: 28 September 1973 (age 53)
- Party: Independent
- Other political affiliations: Nominated by SPD (2025–present)
- Education: ČZU

Martin Šebestyán (born 28 September 1973) is a Czech manager and agricultural expert, who has served as Minister of Agriculture in the third cabinet of Andrej Babiš since December 2025. From 2013 to 2022, he served as director general of the State Agricultural Intervention Fund.
