= Anna Hubáčková =

Czech politician

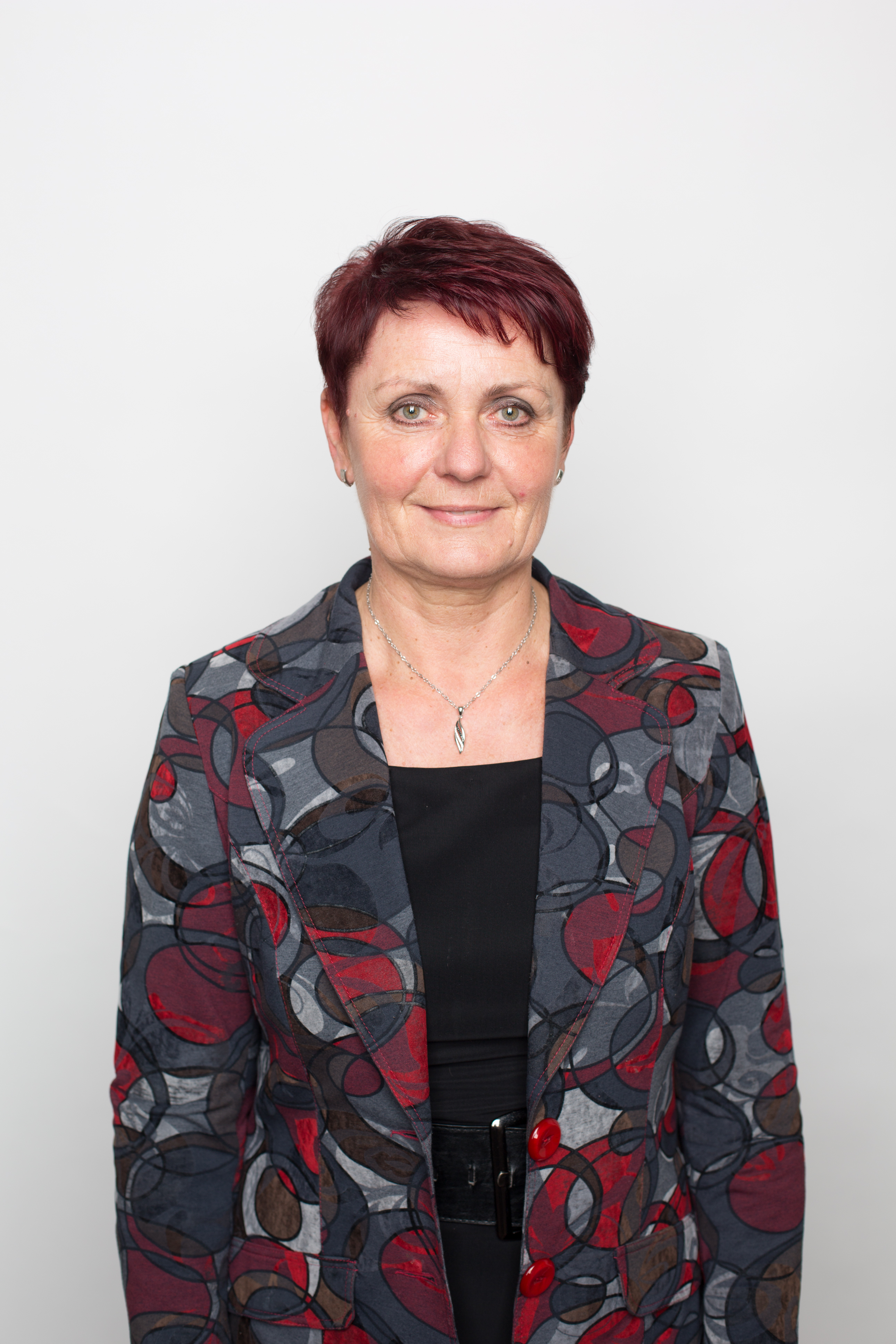
- Hubáčková in 2016

Minister of the Environment
- In office 17 December 2021 – 1 November 2022
- Prime Minister: Petr Fiala
- Preceded by: Richard Brabec
- Succeeded by: Marian Jurečka

Senator from Hodonín
- In office 23 October 2016 – 15 October 2022
- Preceded by: Zdeněk Škromach
- Succeeded by: Eva Rajchmanová

Mayor of Ratíškovice
- In office 3 November 2014 – 29 October 2018
- Preceded by: Josef Uhlík
- Succeeded by: Josef Uhlík

Personal details
- Born: 6 September 1957 (age 69) Ratíškovice, Czechoslovakia
- Party: independent (nominated by KDU-ČSL)
- Education: Masaryk University
- Website: annahubackova.cz

Anna Hubáčková (born 6 September 1957) is a Czech politician, who served as Czech Minister of the Environment in the cabinet of Petr Fiala from December 2021 to November 2022. She was a member of the Czech Senate from 2016 to 2022, as a nominee of KDU-ČSL.
