= Ministry of Regional Development (Czech Republic) =

Government ministry of the Czech Republic

Ministry of Regional Development of the Czech Republic
- Ministerstvo pro místní rozvoj České republiky
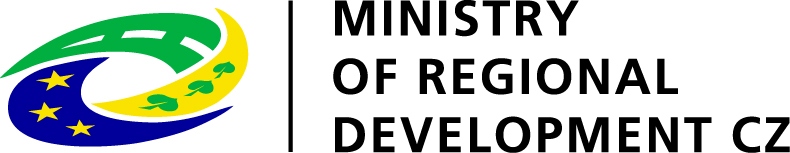

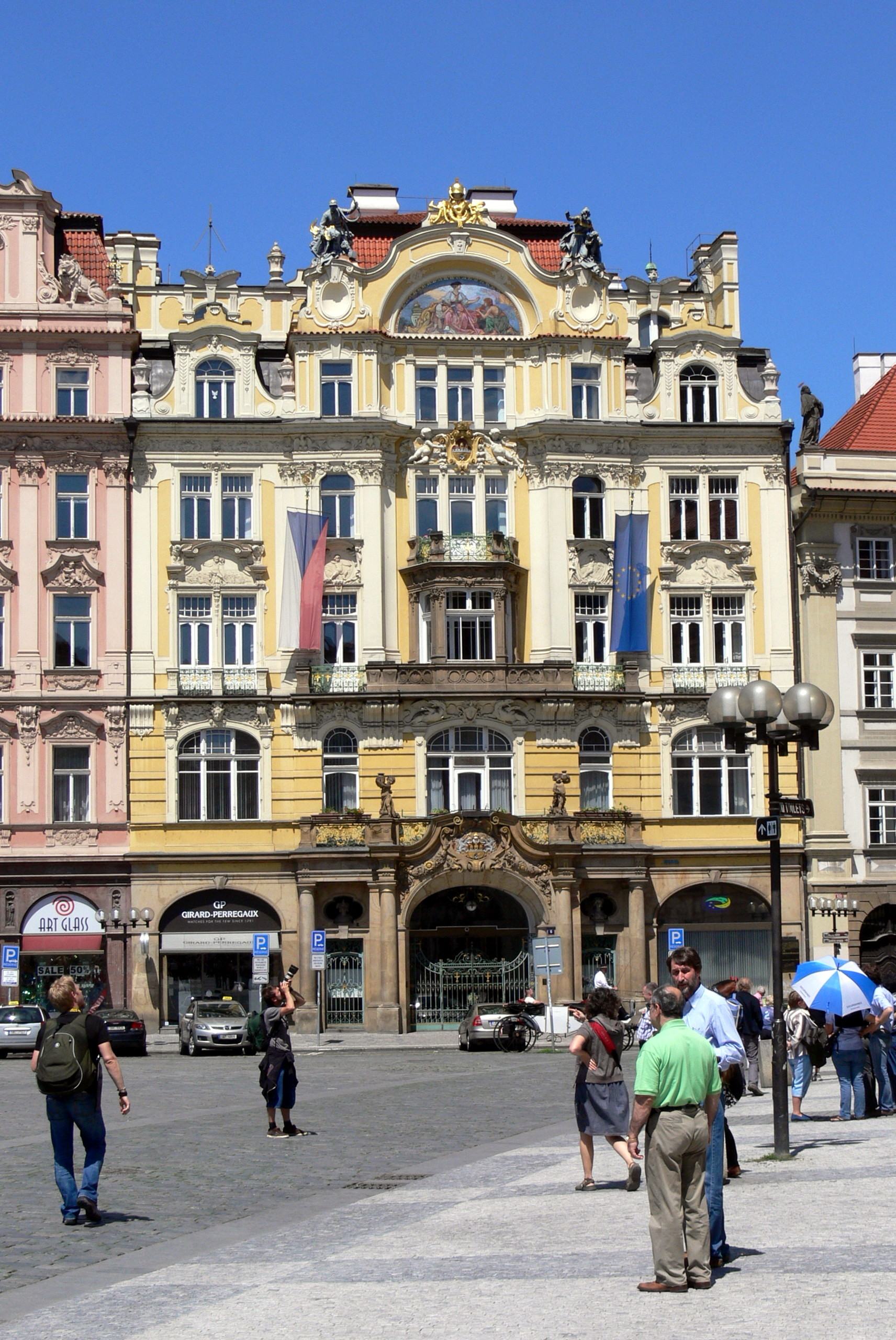

Agency overview
- Formed: 1996
- Headquarters: Staroměstské náměstí 6, 110 00 Prague 1 (Old Town); 50°5′17.6″N 14°25′16.01″E
- Agency executive: Zuzana Mrázová, Minister of Regional Development
- Website: https://mmr.gov.cz/

The Ministry of Regional Development of the Czech Republic (Czech: Ministerstvo pro místní rozvoj České republiky) is a government ministry, which was established in 1996 and is a central government authority in the following areas: Regional policy, Housing policy, Development of housing stock, Letting of flats and non-residential premises, Spatial planning, Building rules, Expropriation, Investment policy, Tourism and Funeral services.
