= Ministry of Labour and Social Affairs (Czech Republic) =

Government ministry of the Czech Republic

Ministry of Labour and Social Affairs Czech Republic
- Ministerstvo práce a sociálních věcí České republiky

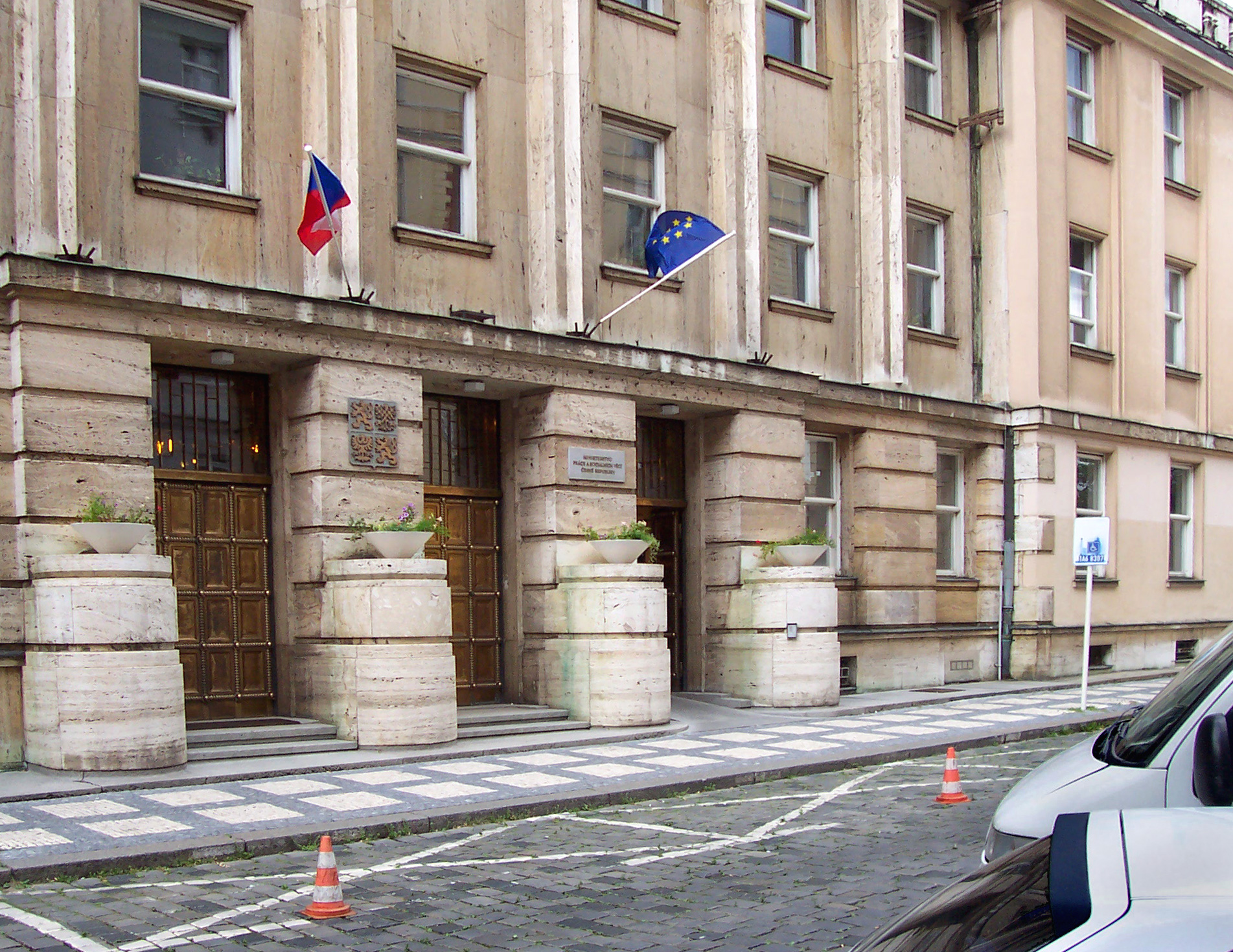

Agency overview
- Formed: 1969
- Headquarters: Na Poříčním právu 1/376, 128 01 Prague 2 (New Town); 50°4′17.21″N 14°24′56.64″E
- Agency executive: Aleš Juchelka, Minister of Labour and Social Affairs
- Website: www.mpsv.cz

The Ministry of Labour and Social Affairs of the Czech Republic (Czech: Ministerstvo práce a sociálních věcí České republiky) is a government ministry, which was established in 1969.
