= Ministry of Agriculture (Czech Republic) =

Government ministry of the Czech Republic

Ministry of Agriculture Czech Republic
- Ministerstvo zemědělství České republiky

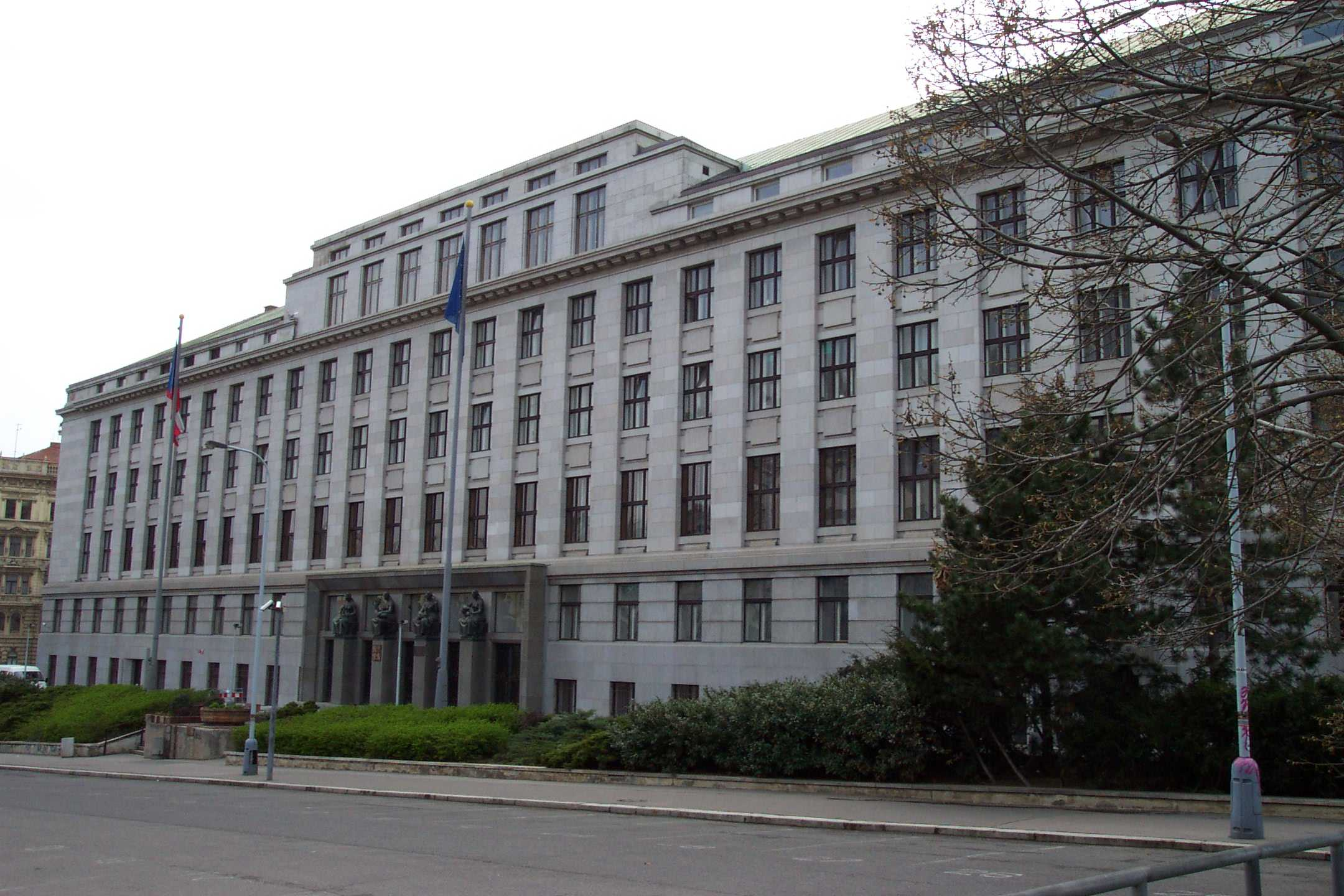

Agency overview
- Headquarters: Těšnov 17, 117 05 Prague 1 (New Town); 50°5′35.52″N 14°26′11.91″E
- Agency executive: Martin Šebestyán, Minister of Agriculture
- Website: mze.gov.cz

The Ministry of Agriculture of the Czech Republic (Czech: Ministerstvo zemědělství České republiky) is a government ministry.
