= Ministry of the Environment (Czech Republic) =

Ministry of the Environment of the Czech Republic
- Ministerstvo životního prostředí České republiky

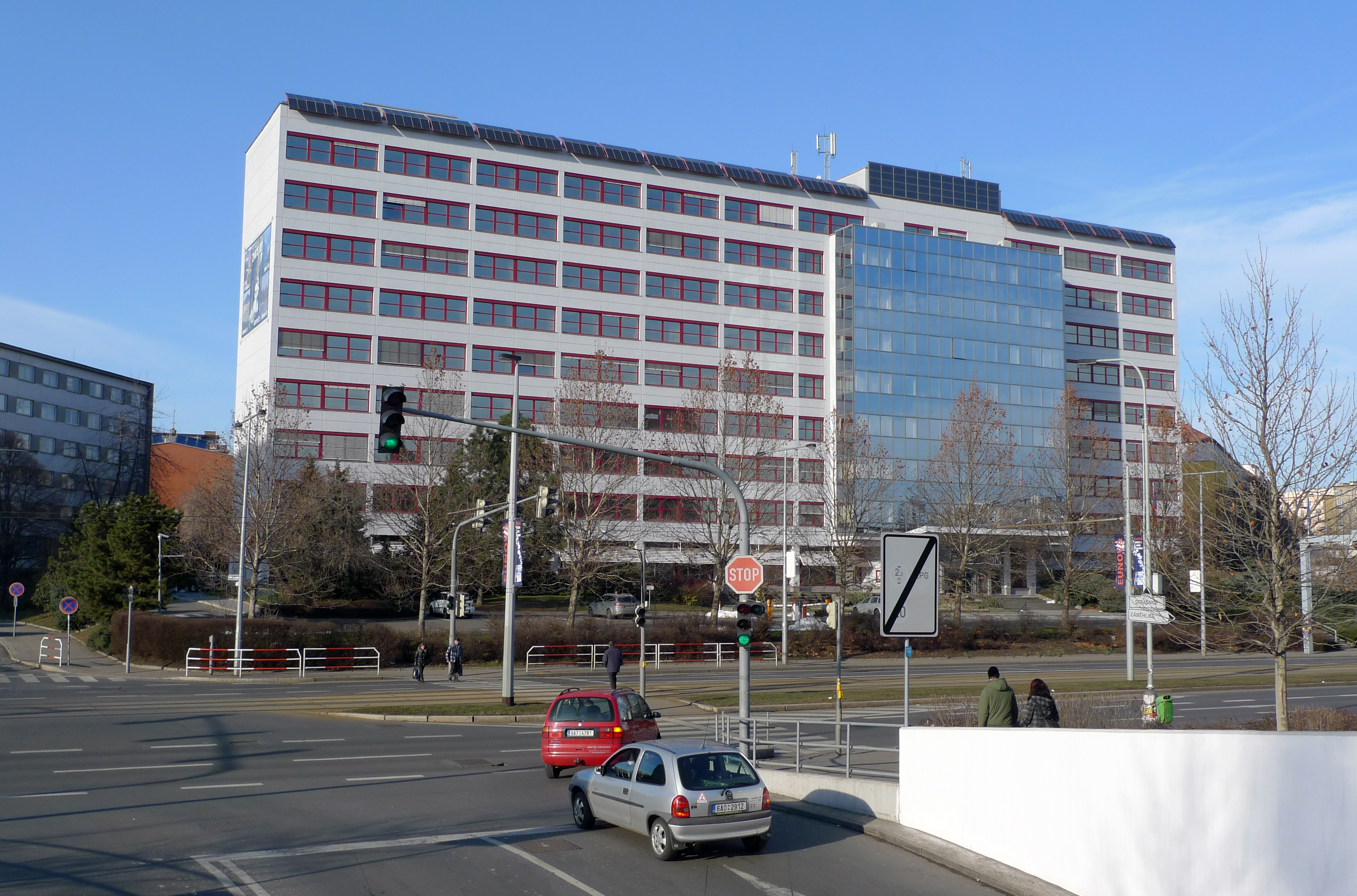

Agency overview
- Formed: 1990
- Headquarters: Vršovická 1442/65, 100 10 Prague 10 (Vršovice); 50°4′10.05″N 14°28′4.41″E
- Agency executive: Igor Červený, Minister of the Environment
- Website: mzp.gov.cz/cz

The Ministry of the Environment of the Czech Republic (Czech: Ministerstvo životního prostředí České republiky) is a government ministry established in 1990. It is the highest body for nature and environmental protection in the Czech Republic.

== History ==
This ministry was established in 1990, before which the environment was divided between the Ministry of Culture, the Ministry of the Interior, and the Ministry of Forestry and Water Management (within the Czech Socialist Republic). Before the Velvet Revolution, the Ministry of the Interior was briefly called MVŽP—the Ministry of the Interior and the Environment. The first independent Minister of the Environment was Bedřich Moldan.

In addition, from 1990 until the end of October 1992, there was the Federal Environment Committee (FVŽP), which ceased to exist in connection with the Dissolution of Czechoslovakia; the first minister — the chairman of the FVŽP was Josef Vavroušek.

Since the beginning of 1993, the Ministry of the Environment has existed as a central body of an independent Czech Republic.

=== Merger of the ministry ===
In June 2010, as part of negotiations on the composition of the center-right government, the ministry was abolished and its agenda merged with other authorities. While Senator Bedřich Moldan negotiating for TOP 09 defended the independence of the ministry, negotiator Civic Democratic Party Jiří Papež advocated a merger of the Ministries of the Environment, Local Development and Agriculture. Public Affairs proposed a merger of the agendas of the Ministries of the Environment and Agriculture.

== Mission ==
The Ministry of the Environment was established on 19 December 1989 as the central body of state administration and the body of supreme supervision in environmental matters. The Ministry of the Environment is the central state administration body for the following areas:

- protection of natural water accumulation, protection of water resources and protection of groundwater and surface water quality
- protection of air
- nature and landscape protection
- area of zoo operations
- protection of the Agricultural Land Fund (ZPF)
- performance of the state geological service
- protection of the rock environment, including the protection of mineral resources and groundwater
- geological work and ecological supervision of mining
- waste management
- Environmental Impact Assessment, including those that transcend national borders.

It is also the central authority of state administration for hunting, fishing and forestry in national parks and the central government body for state environmental policy, for the labelling system of environmentally friendly products and services and for the program supporting voluntary participation in the system of company management and audit from the point of view of environmental protection (EMAS Program). The Ministry acts as the central water authority.

To ensure and control the government of the Czech Republic, the Ministry of the Environment coordinates the procedure of all ministries and other central state administration bodies of the Czech Republic in environmental matters.

== Departmental organizations ==
For its needs, the ministry establishes a number of departmental organizations:

- Nature and Landscape Protection Agency of the Czech Republic (AOPK)
- CENIA, Czech Environmental Information Agency
- Czech Geological Survey
- Czech Environmental Inspectorate (CEI)
- Czech Hydrometeorological Institute (CHMI)
- Cave Administration of the Czech Republic
- Krkonoše National Park Administration
- Administration of the Šumava National Park and Protected Landscape Area
- National park Bohemian Switzerland
- Podyjí National Park Administration
- State Environmental Fund CR (SEF)
- Silva Tarouca Research Institute for Landscape and Ornamental Horticulture (VÚKOZ)
- T. G. Masaryk Water Management Research Institute (VÚV)
- Research Institute of Occupational Safety (VÚBP)
