= Investigation of 2025 Czech government Bitcoin scandal =

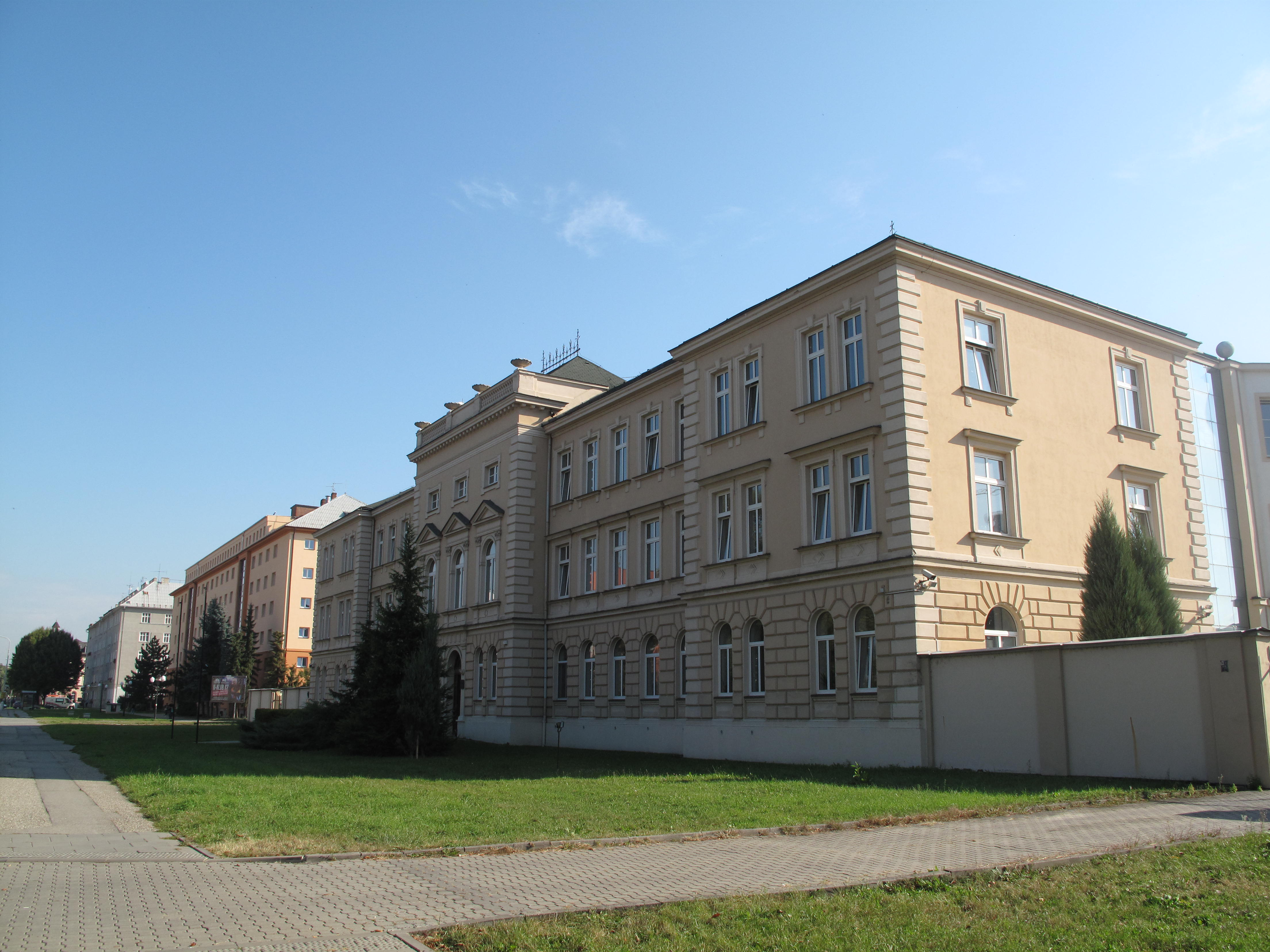
The High Public Prosecutor's Office in Olomouc oversees the investigation into the case.

Investigation of 2025 Czech government Bitcoin scandal comprises a series of political, legal, and media events following the replacement of Pavel Blažek by Eva Decroix as Minister of Justice in June 2025. This personnel change was precipitated by the outbreak of the so-called Bitcoin scandal. (Note: The case concerns a donation in Bitcoin valued at approximately one billion CZK, accepted in March 2025 by the Ministry of Justice under Minister Pavel Blažek (ODS) from convicted drug trafficker Tomáš Jiřikovský.)

A central component of the inquiry involved determining the whereabouts of the donor, Jiřikovský, who had fled the Czech Republic. While journalist Zdislava Pokorná identified the Philippines as his place of residence, officers from the Security Information Service (BIS) later established that Jiřikovský was residing in Taiwan. During his stay abroad, the Czech Bar Association initiated an investigation into Jiřikovský's legal counsel, Kárim Titz, to determine whether he had violated Act No. 253/2008 Coll. (the Anti-Money Laundering Act) while representing his client during the transfer of the gift. The investigation was overseen by the High Public Prosecutor's Office in Olomouc and a parliamentary commission tasked with monitoring the activities of the Financial Analytical Office (FAÚ).

Upon taking office, Decroix established four mechanisms designed to clarify the events preceding the acceptance of the donation. The first element was timeline, which underwent two rounds of updates in an anonymized format. As a second oversight measure, Decroix appointed attorney David Uhlíř as the "Bitcoin Case Coordinator." Uhlíř's mandate was to ascertain whether all internal ministerial regulations had been observed prior to the gift's acceptance. This role was functionally linked to the third measure: an audit report. The audit focused on potential legislative amendments regarding future cryptocurrency donations to the state and evaluated whether the participants in the transfer could have reasonably suspected the illicit origin of the coins. The fourth mechanism involved the engagement of the Supreme Audit Office (NKÚ), which Decroix approached in July 2025.

The transparency mechanisms introduced by Decroix faced widespread criticism. Journalists, legal experts, opposition politicians, law enforcement agencies, and the general public all characterized the minister's approach as detrimental. Primary concerns included the high financial costs of a parallel ministerial inquiry, the potential for public proceedings to compromise the legally binding criminal investigation, (Note: By law, legally binding investigations are conducted exclusively by law enforcement agencies.) and Decroix's perceived partisan bias in managing the ministry's internal probe.

Media coverage focused on both the official criminal proceedings and the ministry's internal inquiry. Reports highlighted a lack of transparency in Decroix's communication regarding the chosen oversight mechanisms, noting that their objectives shifted over time and failed to achieve their original purpose. This failure, combined with potential overreach of authority and inconsistent communication, triggered backlash from the political opposition and law enforcement. The media also pointed to unresolved personnel issues that the oversight mechanisms failed to address. Furthermore, reports surfaced regarding ineffective communication between criminal investigators and those conducting the ministerial probe. The resulting "noise" and procedural friction eventually led the Prosecutor General, Lenka Bradáčová, to exercise supervisory jurisdiction over the High Public Prosecutor's Office in Olomouc.

According to High Public Prosecutor Radim Dragoun, the scope of potential legal violations expanded following Jiřikovský's apprehension in August 2025. This expansion of legal liability was further underscored by Decroix's public remarks, in which she characterized court rulings regarding the return of seized electronics as unlawful. However, the broadening of the case to include other stakeholders was constrained by the head of the BIS, Michal Koudelka, who stated that the case was not instigated by foreign power.

== Stay in Taiwan ==
On 5 June 2025, the news outlet Neovlivni.cz reported that Jiřikovský had departed for Asia. His travel was legally permissible at the time as no formal charges had been brought against him. It was subsequently established that he was staying in Taiwan with his Filipino wife; he was reportedly scheduled to return to the Czech Republic in the latter half of June.

The Czech Bar Association (ČAK) initiated an inquiry into whether Kárim Titz, the attorney representing Jiřikovský, violated anti-money laundering (AML) regulations. Under the Czech AML Act, legal counsel is required to verify the provenance of assets during suspicious transactions. The relevant legislation, Act No. 253/2008 Coll., on Certain Measures against the Legalization of Proceeds from Crime and Financing of Terrorism, governs the operations of the Financial Analytical Office (FAÚ). It defines the "obligated person" subject to reporting requirements, a category that includes practicing attorneys.

== Prosecutorial oversight and investigation ==
The case is being overseen by the High Public Prosecutor's Office in Olomouc, which has identified potential criminal activity involving the abuse of power by a public official, the laundering of proceeds of crime, and the illicit manufacture and trafficking of narcotic and psychotropic substances. Officers from the National Organized Crime Agency (NCOZ) have requested the cooperation of the American FBI to jointly investigate Jiřikovský's alleged links to the darknet marketplace Nucleus Market. On 11 June 2025, members of the parliamentary committee overseeing the Financial Analytical Office (FAÚ) deliberated on the matter and concluded that the office had acted correctly and in accordance with the law.

== No foreign involvement in case, according to BIS ==
During a meeting of the Chamber of Deputies' Committee on Security on 12 June 2025, Michal Koudelka, the Director of the Security Information Service (BIS), assured MPs that the case had not been initiated or orchestrated by foreign powers. On the same day, detectives from the National Centre for Combating Organised Crime (NCOZ) seized documents related to the "Bitcoin case" at the Ministries of Justice and Finance. The newly appointed Minister of Justice, Eva Decroix (ODS), expressed her full cooperation with the investigation and announced plans to present timeline of events to the government within a week. Pavel Žáček (ODS), Chairman of the Committee on Security, stated that investigators would need to engage in international cooperation.

== Ministry negotiations with coin buyers and Decroix’s legality challenge ==
On 17 June 2025, the newly appointed Minister of Justice, Eva Decroix, announced that the Ministry of Justice had liquidated a majority (235) of the 468 donated bitcoins, while expressing an intent to cancel a portion of remaining transactions. The Ministry stated it is in communication with the buyers and has initiated negotiations with the law firm representing the primary purchaser (see legal representative Kirill Juran).

Simultaneously, the Minister disclosed that she is finalizing a "complaint for violation of the law" (in Czech "stížnost pro porušení zákona") regarding the Regional Court in Brno's decision to return seized electronics to Jiřikovský. Decroix asserted that the court's ruling may have been unlawful, alleging a failure to respect the binding legal opinion of the Supreme Court. However, she noted that the contested decision is now irreversible.

== Deputy Přibyl's non-participation in the donation acceptance ==
Daniel Přibyl, a deputy at the Office for Government Representation in Property Affairs (ÚZSVM), received a formal disciplinary warning regarding his attempt to participate in the opening of Bitcoin wallet. Ultimately, Přibyl faced only indirect financial sanctions; he was denied personal bonuses for the second quarter of 2025, which for his colleagues ranged between 46,000 and 126,000 CZK. The Director General of the ÚZSVM, Kateřina Arajmu, confirmed that the office’s role was limited to providing a Bitcoin wallet for the transfer of the donation. Despite being mentioned twice in the initial version of the event timeline, Arajmu stated that Přibyl did not act outside the scope of his official authority.

== Timeline as part of the investigation ==
What is interesting about the timeline is that as early as the beginning of April—prior to the commencement of the auctions of state-donated Bitcoins—the police informed the donor, but not the government or the ministries, that they linked the donor's Bitcoins to suspicious marketplace. Had the police provided this information to the "donee state" at that time, no auctions would have taken place, legal issues with successful bidders would not have arisen, and the Bitcoins would have remained state property. Since no one is asking this fundamental question (yes, it is more media-friendly to "hunt" someone like Stanjura, who unlike the police could not have known about any illegal marketplace), I am taking the liberty of presenting it to the public sphere.

— Pavel Blažek

On 18 June 2025, the Ministry of Justice released the promised timeline, though the document was anonymized. Although MP Eva Decroix had originally intended to include the names of individual actors, representatives of the High Public Prosecutor's Office in Olomouc advised against de-anonymization, citing potential risks to the ongoing investigation. Decroix initially planned to publish a supplemented timeline on 15 August 2025, but was on leave during that period. Consequently, the updated timeline was released one week later.

The second, expanded version was more than twice the length of the original but remained fully anonymized. Decroix stated that disclosing names would not improve public understanding of the case. Journalistic analysis of the extended timeline revealed that the Ministry of Justice continued to auction proceeds from criminal activity, or proportional parts thereof, during the investigation. Despite these findings, Decroix maintained that the additions to the timeline did not alter the legal assessment of the matter.

== Audit as part of the investigation ==
Decroix clarified that if no private firm applied to conduct the audit, a form of internal audit would be necessary. Ultimately, no private entities officially applied for the tender. In July 2025, Decroix secured an auditor for the case: a consortium comprising the firms Grant Thornton Czech Republic and Grant Thornton Audit. The Czech state, via taxpayer funds, paid 3.57 million CZK (including VAT) for the service.

The auditors concluded that the Ministry of Justice should not have accepted the Bitcoin donation, as it was aware beforehand that the assets might have originated from criminal proceeds. In their external report, the auditors criticized the ministry for failing to take necessary steps to rule out the illegality of the donated funds. The report stated: "There is a risk that the acceptance of the donation, its subsequent handling, and its eventual sale through public auction may have fulfilled the elements of certain criminal offenses."

Following a meeting of the STAN leadership, Decroix—who attended the session—was given an ultimatum to release the full audit by the end of August 2025. Decroix convened a press conference on Friday, 8 August 2025, to clarify the role of Uhlíř at the ministry. After the conference, during which Decroix stated she had no new information to share, STAN chairman Vít Rakušan set a condition for any future coalition between STAN and Spolu: that the Ministry of Justice must be led by a minister from the Mayors and Independents.

The second part of the audit summary revealed that the state should amend laws to better define "at-risk assets" and regulate the legislative process for accepting cryptocurrencies as donations. This summary also confirmed that Blažek proceeded with cryptocurrency auctions despite being aware of their origins.

Although STAN cabinet members demanded the public release of the full report, Decroix had not published the complete contents by 1 September 2025. Chief Prosecutor Dragoun requested that Decroix refrain from releasing the full text at that time, arguing that publication could compromise ongoing witness testimony. The failure to publish the audit constituted a breach of the condition set by STAN leadership in early August 2025.

== Investigation by the coordinator and its abrupt conclusion ==
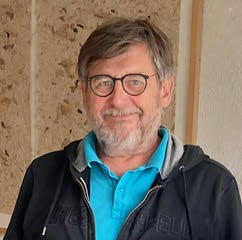
David Uhlíř, who was appointed as the "BTC Case Coordinator" but resigned midway through his term. In a departure from the original contract, he received a partial remuneration of 160,000 CZK.

In June 2025, an internal investigation into the case at the Ministry of Justice was led by a "BTC Case Coordinator." David Uhlíř, a lawyer, was appointed to this role by Eva Decroix. Uhlíř's original remuneration was set at 320,000 CZK for the period from his appointment until October 2025. Decroix described Uhlíř as: "a person who (...) is there also for opposition representatives and others who might feel that an ODS minister is sweeping something under the rug." In addition to Uhlíř, Decroix retained three other law firms in connection with the Bitcoin case. The first two firms are to receive 600,000 CZK from the ministry, including VAT, while the third firm has an hourly rate set at 5,600 CZK.

In a July 2025 interview with Seznam Zprávy, Uhlíř admitted that he did not understand Bitcoin or its underlying technology at all. He further criticized the technology itself due to the production of greenhouse gases during mining operations. Despite his personal lack of expertise, Uhlíř initially intended to complete a report on the case by mid-August 2025. His objective was to analyze the acceptance of the donation and identify errors to be avoided in the future. However, after one month, he abruptly resigned, stating that he would not provide the report at all, though he claimed to have fulfilled the task assigned by Decroix. For his services, Uhlíř received a payment of 160,000 CZK excluding VAT.

I’m not sure whether I was merely used or outright exploited, but they undoubtedly wanted someone other than a complete nobody for the task. — David Uhlíř, about his role as coordinator in November 2025

The failure to produce a final report and Uhlíř's overall role in the investigation were met with incomprehension from Czech President Petr Pavel and representatives of the STAN movement. Decroix responded to the criticism by stating that Uhlíř would draft a report regarding the Ministry's internal processes during the case following his vacation. During a press conference, Decroix likened Uhlíř's continued involvement to: "a theatrical engagement that would again be uneconomical." Upon returning from vacation, however, Uhlíř refused to write the report, asserting that since his professional relationship with the Ministry had ended, he had no reason to work on it. He further remarked that the Ministry should never have accepted the donation in the first place, stating: "He who receives a gift is not free." According to a published timesheet, Uhlíř spent six hours studying the case timeline and another 25 hours on related duties, totaling 60 hours of work for the Ministry of Justice. Decroix herself later noted that the role of the "BTC Case Coordinator" had no actual impact on the steps taken by the Ministry during the investigation.

== Discrepancies regarding access to case documents in the Senate ==
Chief Public Prosecutor Radim Dragoun stated that, as of July 22, 2025, no formal charges had been brought in the case. On the same day, Minister Eva Decroix reiterated that the state had incurred no damages from the acceptance of the donation. In an interview with Reflex, Decroix characterized those highlighting a conflict of interest due to her membership in the Civic Democratic Party (ODS) as purveyors of disinformation.

In response to efforts aimed at restricting the dissemination of investigative details to prevent potential interference, Decroix filed a motion for supervisory review with Supreme Public Prosecutor Lenka Bradáčová. The objective of this oversight was to ensure that the criminal proceedings were not subject to undue delays and that the principles governing the conduct of law enforcement authorities were strictly upheld. Dragoun reacted negatively to the Minister's assertions, maintaining that the staff of the Olomouc Public Prosecutor's Office had consistently responded promptly and to an extent appropriate for the current stage of the criminal proceedings. One day after Decroix requested assistance, the Supreme Public Prosecutor initiated the supervisory review.

On the same day Dragoun confirmed the absence of indictments, the Senate Committee on Foreign Affairs, Defense, and Security met with Decroix to discuss the progression of the case. The session was conducted in a confidential (classified) format. During the meeting, senators discovered they were not entitled to certain segments of information. The Vice-Chairman of the committee, Robert Šlachta, criticized the proceedings, stating:

The meeting was entirely futile. [...] I was not demanding information from the criminal proceedings. [...] I am not one to see ghosts where there are none, but who specifically selected these auditing firms? Why does Dr. Uhlíř have access to all information while senators do not? [...] By whom was Dr. Uhlíř nominated?

Prior to the committee's initial session, Decroix had already withheld all written communication pertaining to the case and failed to answer five specific questions. The meeting concluded with the Senate expressing a conditional belief in the integrity of the Ministry's internal investigation. The day after the committee session, Uhlíř terminated his cooperation with the Ministry of Justice and departed for vacation abroad. The next committee hearing was scheduled for August 26, 2025.

== Coordinator's absence from Senate proceedings ==
During the second hearing of the Senate committee, senators requested a comprehensive timeline detailing the development of the Bitcoin case prior to the assets being donated to the state. In response, Eva Decroix directed the committee to the InfoSoud database. The committee did not establish binding deadline for the submission of this summary. Although David Uhlíř and Lenka Bradáčová were originally invited to the second session, Uhlíř ultimately did not attend. Committee member Jana Mračková Vildumetzová informed the session that Uhlíř had traveled abroad, though he expressed his willingness to participate later, stating, "I would be happy to attend in September."

The High Public Prosecutor, Lenka Bradáčová, briefed the senators on the scope, methodology, and legal framework of the prosecutorial oversight. However, she noted that her mandate to testify before the committee was constrained by statutory confidentiality obligations. Regarding the disclosure of evidence, Bradáčová remarked, "It is always at the discretion of the Minister of Justice which documents are presented to the committee."

== Scope of legal violations expanded ==
Members of the National Center Against Organized Crime (NCOZ) conducted a raid during the night of 14–15 August 2025. Several individuals, including Jiřikovský, were detained, and items pertinent to the criminal proceedings were seized. High Prosecuting Attorney Radim Dragoun stated that the operation pertained to suspicions of laundering proceeds of criminal activity and the illicit handling of narcotics. Commenting on the complexity of the case, Dragoun remarked: "This is a criminal matter that was recently severed by the police authority from joint proceedings into a separate case, as the original scope of the investigation is broader."

== Professional consequences of the investigation ==
The scope of the case is underscored by professional repercussions affecting both direct and indirect participants. In September 2025, the Czech Bar Association investigated Blažek over suspected violations of the Anti-Money Laundering (AML) Act. The Association received the initial complaint in June 2025, followed by a second in August 2025; the complainants alleged that Blažek had breached professional and ethical boundaries. Blažek declined to provide media commentary regarding the grievances filed with the chamber. In March 2026, the Chamber announced that it had declined to file any complaints against Blažek.

Beyond Blažek, the case also impacted the career of Brno public prosecutor Marek Vagai, who represented the state in the 2017 legal proceedings against Jiřikovský. In November 2025, Vagai's superiors considered filing a disciplinary motion, alleging that he failed to sufficiently contest the restitution of seized electronics to the programmer.

== Developments at the Ministry of Justice following the 2025 general election ==
Following the 2025 general election, Jeroným Tejc (ANO), successor to Decroix, stated that while he would prefer to distance himself from the case entirely, he considered it necessary to restructure the Ministry’s legal department to ensure its immunity to political pressure. Tejc emphasized that, beyond implementing technical safeguards to prevent a recurrence of the incident, he must address the event itself.

In December 2025, Tejc reviewed the risks associated with potential litigation against Ministry of Justice. He noted the possibility of not finalizing all contracts with the original cryptocurrency purchasers. By January 2026, Tejc moved to insulate all legal staff responsible for adjudicating further donations to the Ministry from the direct jurisdiction of the Minister, thereby ensuring greater institutional independence.

== Dissolution of the first Olomouc investigative team ==
In January 2026, prosecutor Petra Lastovecká proposed indicting Pavel Blažek for the acceptance of a bribe during a meeting of the High Public Prosecutor's Office in Olomouc. At that time, sufficient evidence reportedly existed to also charge his deputy, Radomír Daňhel. Although Radim Dragoun, who attended the meeting, did not initially contest Lastovecká's plan, a series of irregular developments regarding the composition of the investigative team followed the session’s conclusion.

Following the meeting, Dragoun instructed his subordinate, Petr Šereda, to review Lastovecká’s involvement in the team on the grounds of potential bias. Dragoun claimed this move was based on a recommendation from High Public Prosecutor Lenka Bradáčová. However, Bradáčová subsequently stated the contrary, asserting that her recommendation had actually been to maintain the team's original composition. Šereda, who found the instruction highly unusual given the investigation's new phase, subsequently resigned. He was succeeded by Radek Bartoš, who proceeded to dissolve the existing team; Lastovecká was not included in the newly formed investigative group.

In late March 2026, a press conference was held to address the team's dissolution, attended by Lenka Bradáčová, Zdeněk Kasal, Radim Dragoun, and Lucie Slámová. Bradáčová criticized the opaque communication from the Olomouc prosecutors and noted that her supervisory capacity was limited, while also confirming leaks from the case file.

These limitations arose because Bradáčová had provided testimony to the Police of the Czech Republic regarding a contract signed between the Ministry of Justice and Jiřikovský on July 31, 2025. Consequently, procedural authority shifted to Zdeněk Kasal, who formally approved Dragoun's decision to remove Lastovecká. Dragoun later denied that a formal "first investigative team" had ever existed, claiming Lastovecká had only been tasked with partial assignments.

While Dragoun dismissed reporting by Deník N as factually incorrect in its entirety, journalists from the outlet pointed out that the events detailed in their coverage were effectively confirmed during the press conference. Lucie Slámová confirmed the security breach and stated she had referred the matter to General Inspection of Security Forces (GIBS). The leak from the file was also confirmed by the then-Minister of Justice, Jeroným Tejc.

== Tejc's reaction to the dissclusion of the Olomouc team ==
Then-Minister of Justice Jeroným Tejc characterized the dissclusion of the Olomouc investigative team and the subsequent personnel as peculiar. According to Tejc, the case had been handled by seasoned prosecutors. The minister heavily criticized both the timing of the branch transfer of the case, which occurred immediately prior to the formal indictment of the individuals involved, and the procedural burdens associated with the handoff.

Beyond verbal commentary, Tejc responded politically by proposing the establishment of an oversight body tasked with investigating suspected criminal offenses committed by prosecutors, including data leaks from case files and manipulation of investigative team assignments. This newly conceived institution is intended to be modeled after General Inspection of Security Forces.

== Changes of lead investigators in the case ==
During the investigation of the case, the lead investigator was replaced twice as of March 2026. The first lead investigator of the case ended up facing a criminal complaint over suspicion of committing a criminal offense. The second lead prosecutor in order ended up being dismissed for influencing witnesses after making the following statement to Jiřikovský's mother and brother:

It is certainly not [Titz] who defends the brother's interests, but he defends Mr. Blažek's interests. The brother is not in this alone, but it would be a pity if the others slipped away. The brother was not able to arrange this alone, but other people are behind it.

— the second lead investigator on the stairs to Jiřikovský's mother and brother

Defense attorneys were not satisfied with the third lead investigator either. Jiřikovský's defense lawyers have long criticized the fact that police officers tried to persuade the programmer to cooperate through various informal offers.
