= Dominik Feri =

Czech politician and sex offender (born 1996)

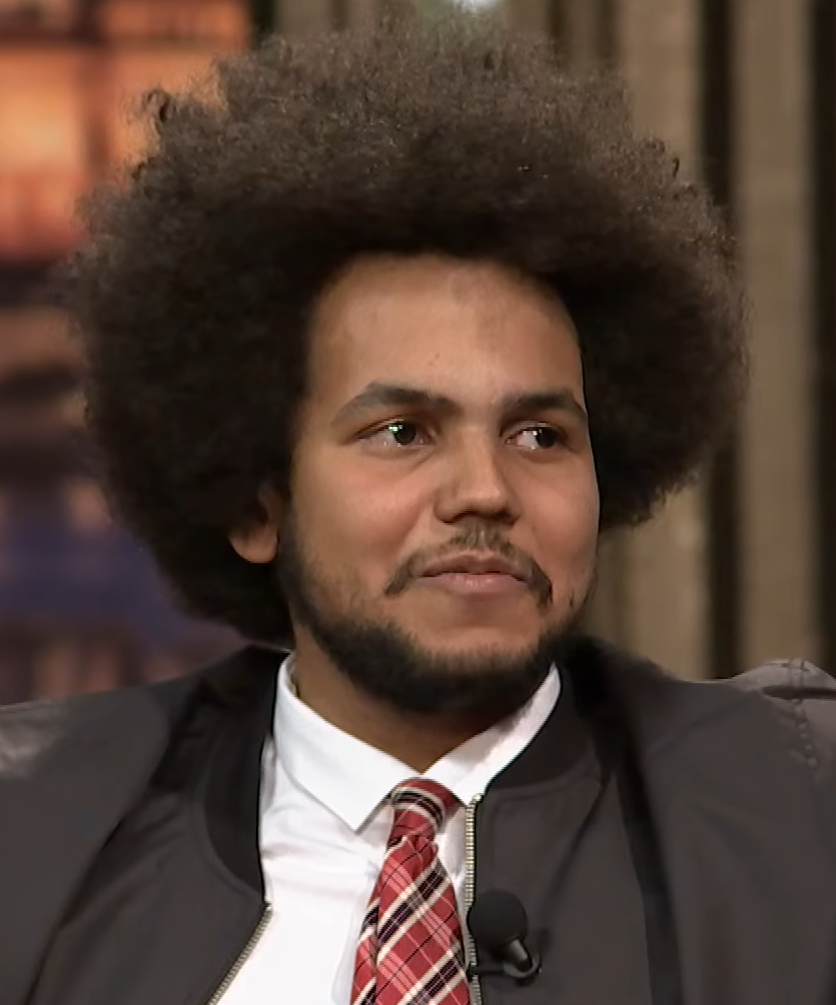
- Feri in 2017

Member of the Chamber of Deputies
- In office 21 October 2017 – 31 May 2021

Councillor of Teplice
- In office 7 November 2014 – 6 October 2018

Teplice Town Assembly Representative
- In office 5 November 2014 – 6 October 2018

Personal details
- Born: 11 July 1996 (age 30) Kadaň, Czech Republic
- Party: TOP 09 (2015–2021)
- Education: Charles University
- Criminal information
- Status: On parole since 26 May 2026 Charges pending (rape of another minor victim)
- Convictions: Rape of a minor Rape; Attempted rape
- Penalty: 3 years imprisonment

Lex Feri
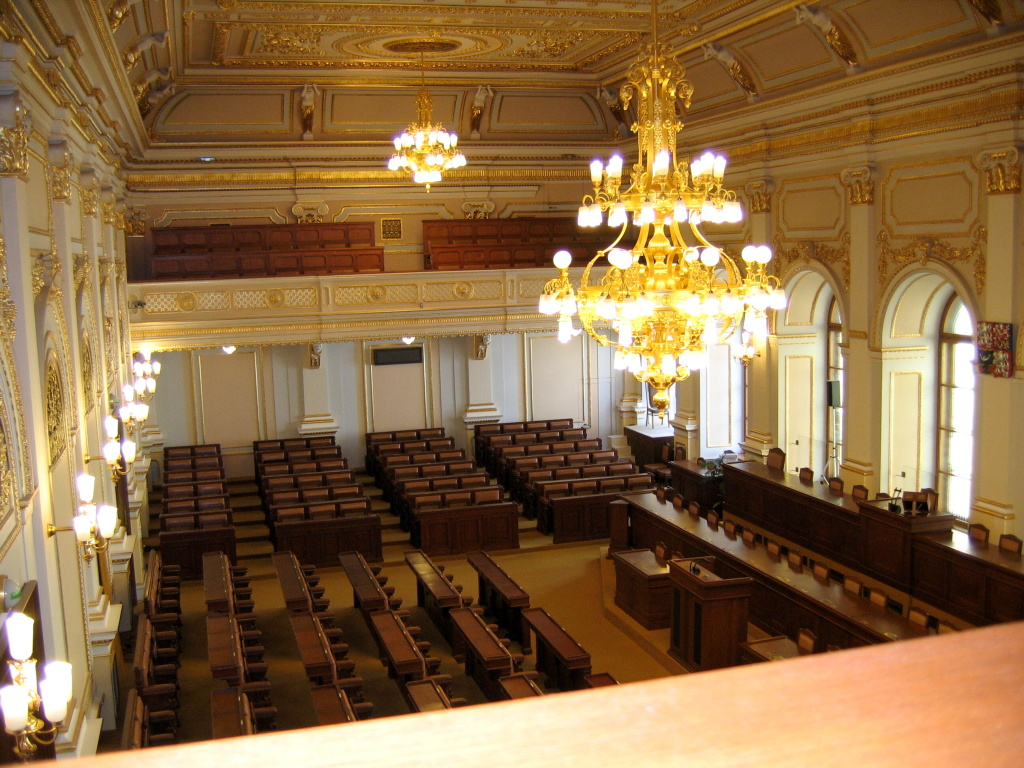

Parliament of the Czech Republic
- Long title: Government bill amending Act No. 40/2009 Coll., the Criminal Code
- Citation: Bill No. 166/2024 Coll.
- Passed by: Chamber of Deputies
- Passed: 10 April 2024
- Passed by: Senate
- Passed: 29 May 2024
- Signed by: President Petr Pavel
- Signed: 7 June 2024
- Commenced: 1 January 2025

Legislative history

Initiating chamber: Chamber of Deputies
- Bill citation: Chamber of Deputies Bill No. 616
- Introduced by: Fiala Government; Represented by Pavel Blažek, Minister of Justice
- Rapporteur: Taťána Malá
- Introduced: 12 January 2024
- Distributed to members: 15 January 2024
- Committee responsible: Committee for Constitution and Law
- First reading: 7 February 2024
- Second reading: 9 April 2024
- Third reading: 10 April 2024
- Voting summary: 168 voted for; None voted against; 1 abstained

Revising chamber: Senate
- Bill citation: Senate Bill No. 251
- Received from the Chamber of Deputies: 30 April 2024
- Rapporteur: Tomáš Goláň
- Committee responsible: Committee for Constitution and Law
- Passed: 29 May 2024
- Voting summary: 63 voted for; 1 voted against; 4 abstained

Summary
- Expands definition of rape in criminal code.
- Status: Not yet in force

Dominik Feri (born 11 July 1996) is a former Czech politician and currently paroled sex offender who served as a member of the Chamber of Deputies of the Czech Republic from 2017 to 2021, representing TOP 09. Feri entered politics in 2014 at the age of 18, becoming the youngest municipal councillor in the country, in the city of Teplice. In the 2017 Czech parliamentary election he was elected to the Chamber of Deputies, becoming the lower house's first black deputy (being of Ethiopian descent), as well as its youngest member at the age of 21.

In 2021 Feri, a vocal and well-known supporter of the Me Too movement, resigned from politics following accusations from about 15 women regarding sexual abuse and rape between 2015 and 2020. On 2 November 2023, he was sentenced to three years in prison for rapes committed in 2016 and 2018, with one of the two victims raped in 2016 being a minor. Feri appealed against the verdict, but his appeal was dismissed by the Municipal Court in Prague on 22 April 2024. The judgement found that Feri had also attempted to rape a woman within the Parliament building.

Feri's case, which included the prosecution's dismissal of allegations of multiple victims, led to an expansion of the definition of the crime of rape in the Czech Criminal Code, so that the legislation clearly covers also situations of rape paralysis. The change of law was dubbed "Lex Feri" by the Czech media.

== General ==
Feri was born in Kadaň, northwestern Bohemia, and grew up in Teplice District. His mother is from eastern Bohemia, and Feri is also partly of Ethiopian origin. From 2007 to 2015 he studied in a grammar school in Teplice. His first appearance in media was because of his public activities in Teplice. In 2015 he became a student of the Faculty of Law at Charles University in Prague.

Feri plays accordion and piano. He stated that his opinions are close to those of the Czech Pirate Party.

In May 2022, Feri was hospitalized with self-inflicted cut wounds to his arms and belly in an apparent suicide attempt.

== Political career ==
During the municipal elections in 2014 he was an independent candidate on the candidate list of liberal-conservative party TOP 09 to the Council of Representatives in Teplice. Although he wasn't elected, he became a first deputy candidate for that office, despite his young age. After the leader of the candidate list Petr Měsíc resigned, Feri took the office and became one of nine members of the City Council, which was led by mayor Jaroslav Kubera. In May 2015 he joined the TOP 09 Party.

After an unsuccessful candidacy in 2016 Czech regional elections, he was listed on the last place of the candidate list in the District of Prague in 2017 Czech parliamentary election. Due to his social media fame and thanks to ranked voting he was elected to the Chamber of Deputies on 21 October 2016. German magazine Die Welt considered Feri to be a successful and promising pro-European politician.

In April 2019, Feri was involved in a scuffle at a wine tasting event in Boršice, Moravia. Feri told media that the alleged attackers had shouted at him "niggers do not belong in politics", however this allegation was not repeated during the formal police investigation. Criminal proceedings against the suspects, who paid Feri CZK 1,000 (~ USD 40) in damages for a torn shirt, were conditionally suspended, i.e. concluded without conviction.

In 2019, Feri was named on the Politico 28 list of people most likely to shape European future, which noted that "it's not easy being young and black in the Czech Republic".

== Rape allegations ==
"I vehemently deny the false allegations of sexual violence that have recently emerged, mostly anonymously in social media (...) As a politician I must expect personal attacks and unfortunately also campaigning which may not always be fair."
Dominik Feri

In late May 2021, Feri was accused of sexual assault and rape by eight women, whose names were kept secret by the online publishing websites A2larm and Deník N. This story was published in the two online newspapers after a discussion was started by an anonymous Twitter account, where many participants wrote about Feri being aggressive to women, in many cases demanding sexual intercourse. As was stated in Czech media, these alleged assaults and sexual offense cases took place between 2015 and 2020. A number of unnamed sources cited in the articles noted that Feri's behavior had been known in his social circles for an extended period of time. Feri subsequently announced his resignation and withdrawal from the 2021 Czech parliamentary election, and left TOP 09, his political party.

More women came forward after the initial articles were published. This led to further allegations of Feri's sexual misconduct being published in early June 2021 by the two sites. Names of the accusers were again withheld. While the accusers in the previous article described use of force, one of the new accusers alleged that Feri had used a date rape drug on her. The testimonies portrayed a pattern of behavior whereby Feri, who had over 1.1 million online followers, would contact young women, some of them underage, often living far away from Prague, through social media for a friendly meeting or a party. The girls, dazzled by his VIP persona, would voluntarily accept the invitation, sometimes after weeks of persuasion. Initially friendly meetings with Feri, who was well known for his support for Me Too movement, with talks focused on politics or societal issues, would allegedly later turn violent and end in either sexual assault, rape, or successful escape.

== First rape trial ==
=== Charges and indictment ===
After the newspaper articles were published, the Police of the Czech Republic opened an investigation into the case. In March 2022, Feri was charged with multiple counts of rape and attempted rape. As one of the alleged rape victims was only seventeen years old, Feri was charged also with rape of a child (the age of consent in the Czech Republic is 15), which carries a sentence of up to 10 years imprisonment. The charges concerned rapes committed on three different victims. A further investigation regarding rape and sexual assault allegations brought by five other accusers concluded in September 2022 with no charges.

Feri was indicted on 13 December 2022. The District State Attorney Office for Prague 3 stated that the indictment was for two counts of rape and one count of attempted rape, without specifying which of the three counts concerned the child. Feri commented: "I welcome the fact that after a nearly two-year wait, I will be able to present evidence to the court proving my innocence. Until now, I have not been able to comment publicly on the ongoing proceedings in any substantive way, which has resulted in the media being reduced to one-sided statements. However, this is about to finally change."

=== Trial ===
First Feri rape trial
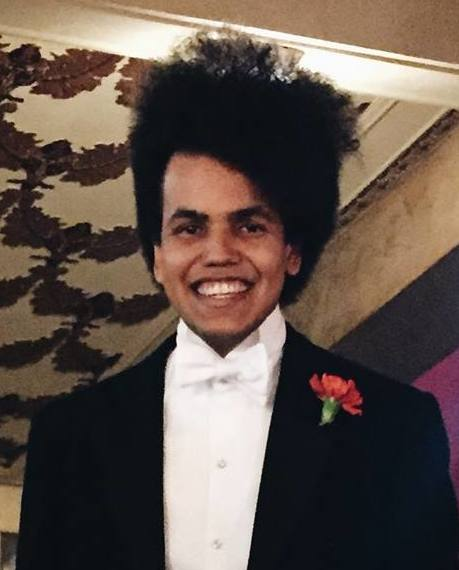
- Feri at a ball
- Court: Prague 3 District Court; Conviction for rape of a minor, rape & attempted rape 3 years imprisonment
- Started: February 15, 2023
- Decided: November 2, 2023

Case history
- Appealed to: Municipal Court in Prague; Libor Vávra (presiding)
- Subsequent action: Appeal rejected on April 24, 2024.

Court membership
- Judges sitting: Lenka Hájková (presiding)

==== Charges and defense ====
Dominik Feri's rape trial commenced on 14 February 2023. Before entering the court room, Feri named one the accusers in cases which had been dismissed by the prosecution, for which he was condemned by journalists and politicians alike.

In order to protect the privacy of the victims, the senate decided to exclude the public during their witness statements as well as during the presentation of expert opinions. The rest of the trial remained open to the public.

The trial concerned the following three counts of rape and attempted rape:

- Count 1 of rape of a child, which was alleged to have taken place in Feri's flat in Prague in March 2016. The State Attorney alleged that Feri had invited an underage girl into his flat, where he sexually harassed her, stating that she was "little and immature", and that other women would appreciate his advances. The child allegedly refused to engage in sexual activity with Feri. He then allegedly offered her Fanta, and after drinking it, she fell into a semi-unconscious state, at which point Feri allegedly started to rape her first with his fingers, and then orally by performing cunnilingus on her.
  - In his opening statement, Feri refused the indictment, stating that he considered such behaviour repulsive, and that he had never abused any of the victims. Regarding the first count, Feri alleged that the situation was mutually consensual. Feri stated that on the day of the alleged rape, the pair had a date which started in a wine bar. They then went into his flat, where they engaged in mutual kissing. However, the victim refused to go further. Feri alleges that afterwards they slept in the same bed with no further intimate activity. Feri vehemently refused putting any drugs into the victim's drink.
- Count 2 of rape, which was alleged to have taken place in Feri's flat in Prague in November 2016. The State Attorney alleged that Feri had invited a young woman along with his friends into his flat. Once inside, he started to sexually assault her, responding to her refusals by saying that "she should stop causing trouble". The woman felt paralyzed, at which point Feri supposedly brought her to a bedroom and raped her.
  - Feri refused also the second count, claiming he and the victim were a couple in an ongoing sexual relationship. He also pointed out communication that he and the victim had after the alleged rape and claimed that they had remained in contact after the date of the alleged rape.
- Count 3 of attempted rape which was alleged to have taken place within the building of the Chamber of Deputies in February 2018. The State Attorney alleged that Feri had invited a young woman for an interview for an internship position and attempted to rape her.
  - Feri stated that the third alleged victim had contacted him regarding a possible internship. He invited her into the Chamber of Deputies, where both of them drank some beers in the parliament's bar in the evening. On the way to his office, they engaged in allegedly mutual kissing in the elevator. Feri stated that he later apologized for the kissing as unprofessional. He alleged that nothing else happened, claiming it illogical that he would try to rape the woman in a publicly accessible part of the TOP 09 party's parliamentary quarters (common kitchen area), as claimed by the victim, while his private office was right next to it.

After denying the particular rape counts, Feri stated: "I certainly didn't suffer from a lack of interest from women at the time. There was a lot of interest, sometimes unpleasant. I certainly didn't have to force anything. I'm being ascribed something that has no basis in logic as to why I should do it."

==== Testimonies and evidence ====
After the conclusion of Feri's testimony, the public was excluded for the testimony of the first alleged victim, which lasted for four hours.

In the afternoon of the first day, the court was again open to the public for testimonies of witnesses. The first witness was a friend of the first victim. She testified that she had received a phonecall from the victim the day after the alleged rape. The victim described to the witness that she had voluntarily entered Feri's flat. After refusing his advances, she claimed to have drunk a beverage, and subsequently only remembered snippets of what happened afterwards. The victim described being unable to move, and having been subject to penetration by Feri's fingers and subjected to oral sex. The witness stated that victim was very stressed and that she was in no doubt regarding the truthfulness of the victim's statement. She further commented that they both used to admire Feri before the incident. The witness reported that the victim had started to suffer from panic disorder, and was also particularly angry that Feri was publicly supporting the Me Too Movement after the incident.

The trial continued on 16 February 2023 with statements of the alleged victims No. 2 and 3, as well as a presentation of expert opinions. The public was excluded from the courtroom for the day.

The trial continued in April 2023, and then adjourned to November 2023.

==== Sentencing ====
On 2 November 2023, Feri was found guilty as charged and sentenced to three years in prison and ordered to pay a total of 510,000 CZK (US$22,000) monetary compensation to the three victims.

=== Appellate decisions ===
==== Municipal Court in Prague ====
"The consequence and intent of his behaviour was to diminish the dignity of women, creating an intimidating, hostile and degrading environment. It was thus an unequal treatment of women. The convict treats women as tools for his own gratification and considers them inferior to him. He treated them as objects and his behavior was of a serial consummatory nature, with an absence of reflection."
Adéla Hořejší, attorney representing the victims

During a public hearing held on 22 April 2024 the Municipal Court in Prague dismissed Feri's appeal. The conviction thus became final.

==== Supreme Court ====
On 18 December 2024, the Supreme Court of the Czech Republic rejected Feri's motion for review of the case.

==== Constitutional Court decision ====
On 9 July 2025, the Constitutional Court of the Czech Republic refused Feri's petition for review of the case, dismissing his claim that he was denied a chance to properly defend self in the proceedings, stating that he was given opportunity by the courts to comment on all relevant issues of the case. The decision was published under No. II.ÚS 951/25.

=== Imprisonment ===
In late May 2024, Feri received summons to prison. He was ordered to start serving his prison term by 27 May 2024 at the latest. Feri entered Teplice prison on 26 May 2024.

At the beginning of November 2024, Feri was transferred to Pankrác Prison Hospital after he used a razor blade belonging to an HIV-positive inmate, so that he could receive a preventative HIV treatment.

On 15 January 2026, the District Court in Teplice denied Feri's motion for conditional release after serving half of the sentence. Judge Jaroslav Malchus held that Feri has not shown any self-reflection, and that there is a reason to believe that if he were again in a position of power, Feri would repeat his criminal behaviour towards women. Feri filed appeal against the decision, but the Regional Court in Ústí nad Labem confirmed the parole denial in March 2026.

On 26 May 2026, the District Court in Teplice released Feri on parole after serving two thirds of the sentence.

== Second rape trial ==
=== Constitutional Court ===
II. ÚS 527/23
- Court: Constitutional Court of the Czech Republic
- Decided: June 12, 2024
- Transcript: II. ÚS 527/23

Case history
- Subsequent action: Reopening of investigation regarding rape of a minor

Court membership
- Judges sitting: Jan Svatoň (presiding); Tomáš Lichovník; David Uhlíř

On 12 June 2024, the Constitutional Court of the Czech Republic delivered decision II. ÚS 527/23 regarding petitions of five further alleged victims who had claimed that their constitutional rights were violated by police decision not to charge Feri in connection with their rape claims. The Court dismissed four of the petitions, stating that although sexually predatory, Feri's conduct didn't amount to criminal definition of rape. At the same time, the Court ruled in favor of the fifth alleged victim and nullified the police decision on conclusion of the investigation. In this case, the 17-year-old victim alleged that she had first engaged in voluntary intercourse with Feri. However, when Feri proceeded to take off his condom, the victim refused to have further intercourse. The Court held that it found "no reasonable reason why consent to a particular sexual activity should preclude criminal liability for an offender who coerces a victim (through the use of violence or the exploitation of his or her defencelessness) to engage in sexual activity substantially different".

=== District Court ===
Second Feri rape trial
- Court: Prague 3 District Court
- Started: May 17, 2026
- Decided: May 18, 2026

Case history
- Appealed to: Municipal Court in Prague
- Subsequent actions: 1st instance acquittal voided, case returned for retrial

Court membership
- Judges sitting: Marek Bodlák (presiding)

On 18 March 2025, Feri was charged with rape of a minor dating back to 2015. In line with the previous Constitutional Court decision, Feri was accused of forcing non-consensual sex on the 17 year old victim without condom, which took place after previous consensual intercourse with a condom. On 14 January 2026, Feri was indicted as charged. In his court questioning in May 2026, Feri denied the allegation, stating that the intercourse was always with a condom, as he had no interest in "becoming a 19-year-old father". Feri claimed that the accuser was "compiling a lie after a lie", claimed that they were "friends with benefits", and that she found a new boyfriend after the supposed act of rape and wrote to Feri that "she does not wish to stop seeing him". On 18 May 2026, District Court for Prague 3 judge Marek Bodlák held that the act took place as indicted, however it could not be considered as a rape under the then effective criminal code provisions. District State Attorney Petra Gřivnová filed appeal against the verdict.

=== Municipal Court in Prague ===
Following State Attorney's appeal, the Municipal Court in Prague repealed Feri's acquittal and returned the case to the Prague 3 District Court.

== In popular culture ==
Three months after Feri's sexual violence accusations were published, Czech rapper Hugo Toxxx published a music video titled DOMINIK FERI as a social commentary of the Feri rape case.
