= 2025 Czech government Bitcoin scandal =

Political scandal

The 2025 Czech government Bitcoin scandal was a scandal in the Czech Republic that involved a donation of 468 Bitcoins to the country's Ministry of Justice. The Czech daily newspaper, Deník N, reported that the Minister of Justice, Pavel Blažek, accepted the donation from Tomáš Jiřikovský, which was worth one billion Czech koruna at the time (approximately $45,000,000 USD). Jiřikovský had previously been convicted of embezzlement, drug trafficking, and illegal possession of weapons in 2017.

After Jiřikovský's early release from prison in 2021, he attempted to recover the Bitcoin wallets. In 2023, he hired a lawyer acquainted with the Justice Minister, hoping to recover the seized devices containing the wallets. Deník N reported the suspicious bitcoin transfer to the Czech Ministry of Justice in 2025. The Ministry was notified by the donor's lawyer on 26 May 2025, that the bitcoin had been seized.

Pavel Blažek, a member of the Civic Democratic Party, subsequently resigned on 31 May 2025. Blažek stated that he approved the donation without verifying its origin but denied that his actions were illegal. The donation was not returned to Jiříkovský.

On 18 June 2025, 98 of the 192 members of the Parliament voted to oppose a no-confidence motion against the government of Prime Minister Petr Fiala, which was filed by the opposition party ANO 2011. This was the fourth no-confidence vote survived by the Fiala government since entering power in 2021.

== Background ==
The controversy concerns a donation made to the Czech Ministry of Justice by Tomáš Jiříkovský, a convicted criminal who operated the dark web marketplace known as the Sheep Marketplace, which was used for illegal transactions. Jiříkovský was convicted in 2017 for offenses including embezzlement, drug trafficking, and illegal arms possession. After his early release from prison in 2021, he sought to reclaim the bitcoin that had been seized during his arrest. Later, he donated 30% of these assets to the Ministry of Justice.

== Public disclosure ==
Sequence diagram illustrating the escrow transaction model involving Tomáš Jiřikovský, based on investigation of Czech Television.

The case was uncovered by Zdislava Pokorná from Deník N, who published an article on 28 May 2025 listing Tomáš Jiřikovský among the wealthiest Czechs, with an estimated net worth of approximately two billion Czech koruna (CZK). Sheep Marketplace, operated by Jiřikovský, used bitcoin as currency to keep vendors and consumers pseudonymous. Jiřikovský earned substantial profits through commissions of each transaction. While running the marketplace, he was defrauded of 5,400 bitcoins by Nathan Gibson and Sean Mackert, who exploited a vulnerability in the marketplace's source code. In December 2013, they managed to steal nearly 841 bitcoins from buyers and sellers on the platform, the equivalent of over 16 million Czech koruna at that time, or around 22–24 million Czech koruna in 2025.

=== Jiřikovský's sentence ===
In 2017, a court sentenced Jiřikovský to nine years in prison for embezzlement, drug trafficking, and illegal possession of firearms. He was released for his good behavior after serving half of his sentence (specifically four years, seven months, and seven days). On 19 November 2020, Břeclav District Court granted his request for conditional release, establishing a six-year probation period ending in November 2026.

== Return of computing equipment ==
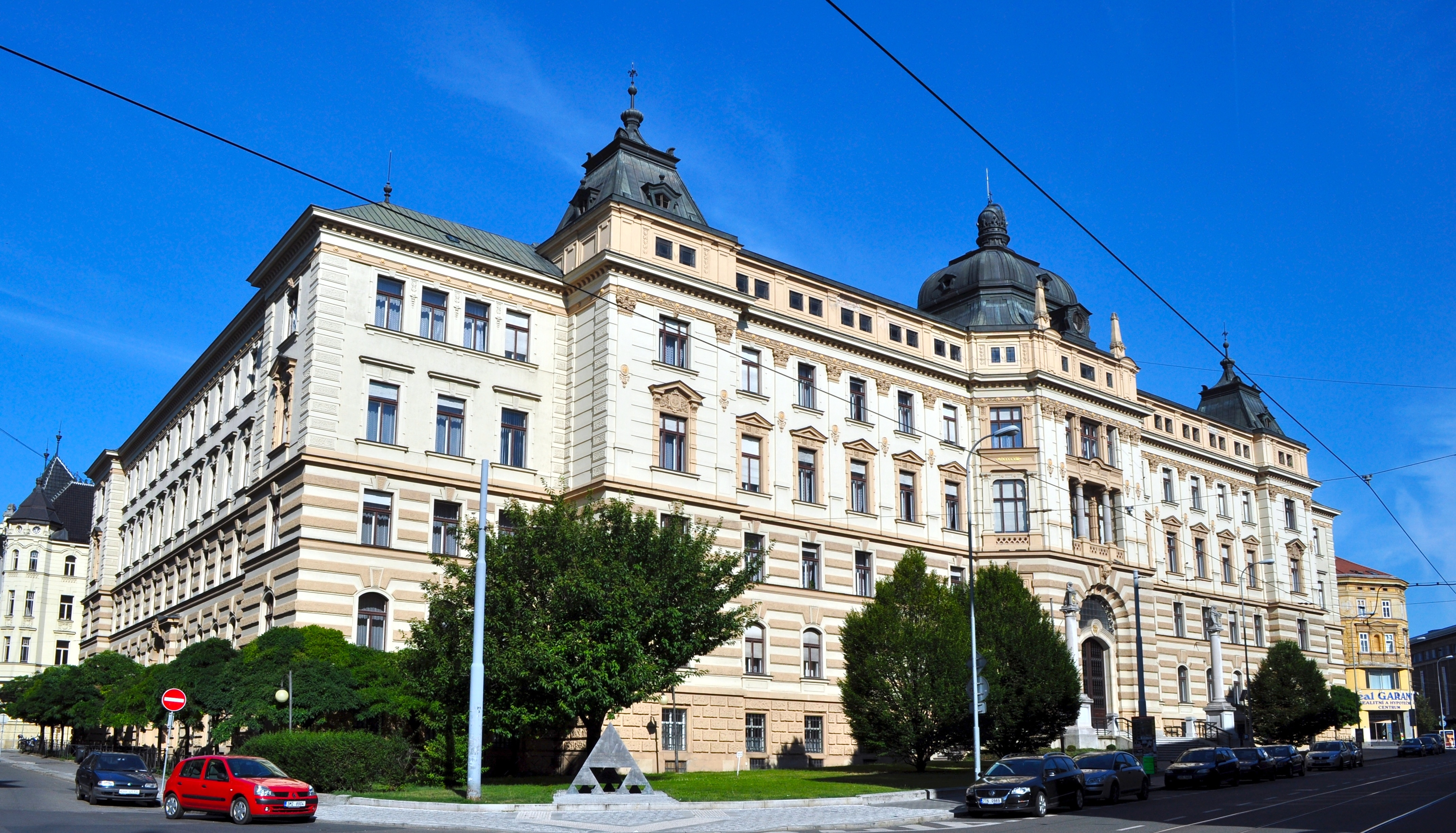
Krajský soud v Brně, which issued the final ruling on the return of the unformatted hardware.

Since 2021, legal proceedings have been underway regarding seized electronics. Initially, the Krajský soud v Brně and the Vrchní soud v Olomouci ruled that the hardware should be returned, but only after its contents were wiped. This was intended to prevent Jiřikovský from regaining access to remaining bitcoins through the data on the devices. However, in 2023, the Supreme Court of the Czech Republic overturned this, ruling that the data should not be deleted. The court held that if it cannot be proven beyond doubt that the computers contained bitcoins obtained through suspicious means, Jiřikovský is entitled to the return of the devices in their original state.

In January 2025, Krajský soud v Brně issued a final ruling to return the main portion of the hardware to Jiřikovský without formatting it, after Jiřikovský claimed he had forgotten the passwords to the computers. The court ordered the wiping of only three laptops and one data storage device (an external drive), where experts determined he could have gained access to crypto-wallets. Eight encrypted devices were returned intact, including two encrypted computers, three phones, and three tablets. A total of approximately 30 devices were returned.

Upon the return of the hardware, Jiřikovský also regained access to cryptocurrency wallets containing assets other than bitcoin. Specifically, he accessed Bitcoin Cash valued at 16 million CZK at the time. The official notary record of the bitcoin handover contained no mention of these alternative cryptocurrencies.

== Bitcoin donation agreement ==
The initial correspondence from attorney Kárim Titz, containing an offer of bitcoins, reached the Ministry in mid-August 2023. It was received by Deputy Minister Antonín Stanislav (ODS), who subsequently resigned in the spring of 2024 following a series of unrelated allegations. The attorney proposed the transfer of high-value bitcoins to the Czech Republic on the condition that the state return seized hardware to Jiřikovský. Titz argued that Jiřikovský had already completed his sentence for operating the illegal darknet market Sheep Marketplace, his assets had been forfeited, and the police had failed to establish that the bitcoins stored on his computer were proceeds of crime (an argument later echoed by Minister Blažek). At that time, law enforcement was unaware of any connection between Jiřikovský and the Nucleus marketplace.

In mid-December 2024, Karel Dvořák, the Political Deputy to Minister Blažek and Vice-Chairman of Mayors and Independents (STAN) movement, received an official email as part of his duties at the Ministry of Justice addressing a previously submitted offer by attorney Titz regarding a bitcoin donation to the state. The response from the Deputy, and by extension the Minister, stated that under the law, the hardware containing the cryptocurrencies could only be released to Jiřikovský by a court, and that the Ministry is prohibited from interfering with judicial proceedings.

As early as January 2025, Titz suggested in an email to Ministry of the Interior employees that the funds in question might not be entirely legitimate. Legal experts from the Ministry of Finance subsequently drafted a formal warning on 12 February 2025 in response to documents received from the Ministry of Justice regarding a proposed donation agreement with Jiřikovský. The legal opinion cautioned that the donation could represent a moral hazard, that the bitcoins might originate from criminal activity, and that the contract could serve as a pretext for money laundering. However, then-Minister of Finance Zbyněk Stanjura did not review the warning until 25 March—three weeks after the contract with Jiřikovský had been signed—as the documents were intended as briefing materials for a scheduled meeting with Minister Blažek.

The three-page legal warning was not delivered to Stanjura in a timely manner by his chief of staff, Filip Benda. Benda declined to comment on why he waited 40 days to inform the Minister about the donation. His brother, Marek Benda, later characterized Filip Benda's involvement in the affair as a mistake. Despite pressure from the parliamentary opposition and government MPs from the STAN party to dismiss him, Stanjura retained Benda in his position.

In March 2025, attorney Kárim Titz proposed an agreement to the Ministry of Justice whereby the Ministry would receive 30% of the contents of cryptocurrency wallet upon its joint opening. Titz subsequently confirmed that Jiřikovský's objective was to utilize the donation as tax deduction. Titz further asserted that "the court records did not indicate that the devices contained any proceeds of crime. On the contrary, as early as 2013, the client possessed 1,172 bitcoins with no connection to criminal activity, a fact supported by expert testimony."

The negotiations for the bitcoin donation agreement were conducted by Radomír Daňhel, a former Deputy Minister of Justice. During the process, Daňhel repeatedly sought to clarify what the potential response of Financial Analytical Office (FAÚ) would be regarding the donated bitcoins should they be found to originate from criminal activity. According to Titz, Jiřikovský's specific motivations were never addressed during the negotiation of the donation to the Ministry.

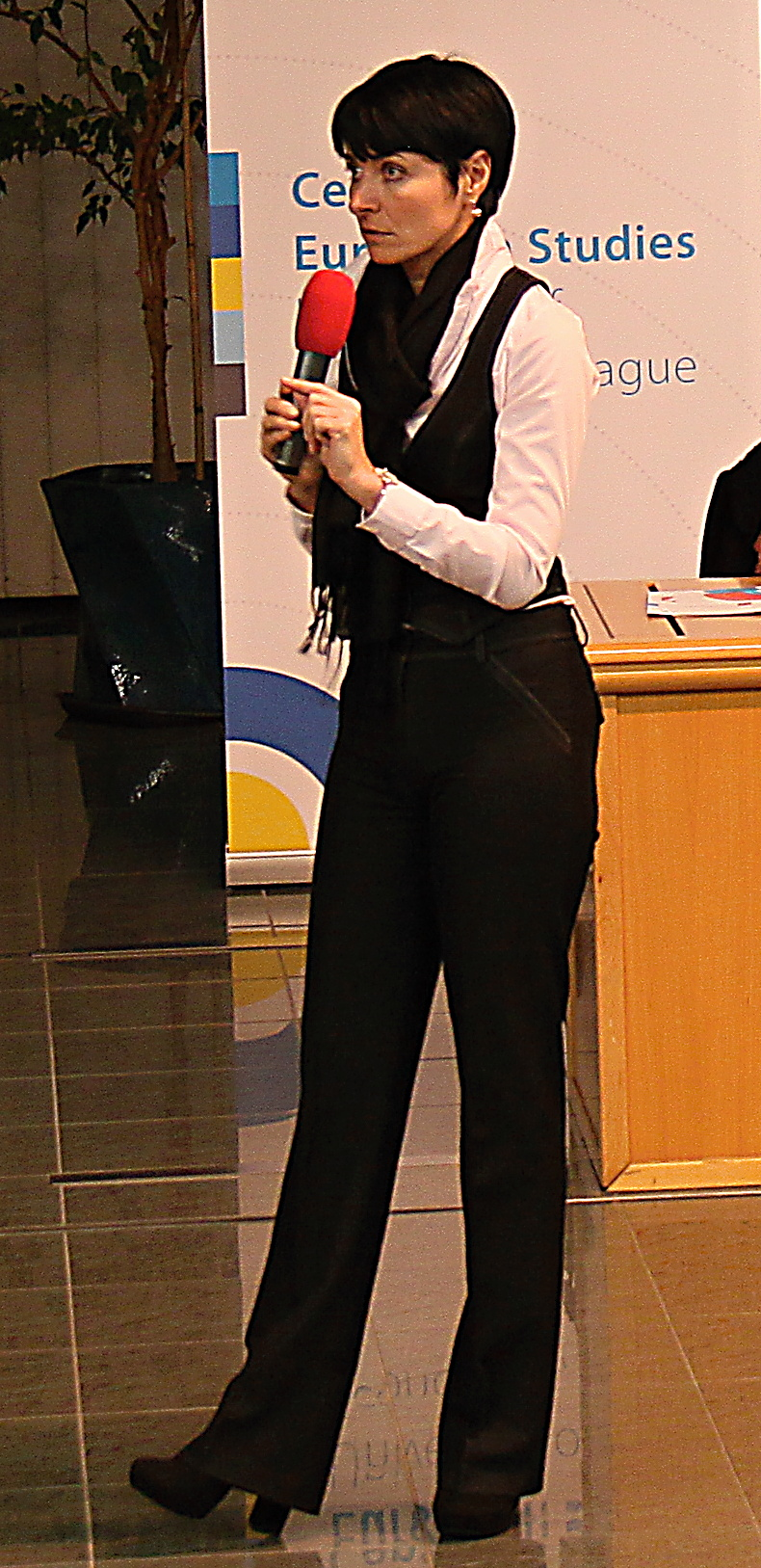
Ministry of Justice staff did not notify the Supreme Public Prosecutor's Office until Lenka Bradáčová assumed the role of Supreme Public Prosecutor following her nomination by Blažek in January 2025.

Titz stated that, within the draft agreement, he proposed that the Ministry of Finance, the Financial Analytical Office, the Office for Government Representation in Property Affairs, and the Supreme Public Prosecutor's Office all be informed of the pending transaction. However, the matter was not reported to the FAÚ until a week later, with Daňhel personally briefing FAÚ leadership only in late March. The Supreme Public Prosecutor's Office was officially notified of the transaction on 1 April, coinciding with the appointment of Lenka Bradáčová as head of the office by Minister Blažek. In July 2025, Bradáčová provided a formal clarification regarding the timeline of when the Supreme Public Prosecutor's Office was first apprised of the contract between the Ministry of Justice and Jiřikovský. Subsequent police findings concerning the prosecution's involvement in the case led to Bradáčová's recusal from the legal supervision of the investigation to ensure impartiality. Bradáčová officially learned of the donation on her first day in office in April 2025. At around the same time, Daňhel inquired by letter how she intended to use the funds from the accepted gift. The then-High Public Prosecutor stated that the money would be allocated for electronic equipment across the public prosecution system. Journalists noted discrepancies in the statements contained in the case file: while Bradáčová was officially informed of the donation on April 1, 2025, the then-Minister of Justice, Blažek, had informed Kateřina Arajmu, Director of the Office for Government Representation in Property Affairs, that Bradáčová had known about the donation as early as February 6 of that year.

Furthermore, journalists pointed out inconsistencies between the testimonies of Arajmu and her former deputy regarding the ministry being warned prior to the acceptance of the gift. The deputy also confirmed that his office lacked any prior experience in verifying the provenance of cryptocurrencies.

== Bitcoin issuance ==
Blažek initially stated that the crypto wallet was opened in the presence of a notary, who, according to the official record, arrived on March 7. However, an investigation by Radiožurnál revealed that hundreds of bitcoins valued at approximately two billion CZK had already been transferred to two separate accounts a day earlier. One of the accounts belongs to Jiřikovský, while the owner of the second remains unknown. Contrary to initial erroneous assumptions that the wallet contained 5366 bitcoins (roughly 12.5 billion CZK), which would have netted the Ministry up to 3.7 billion CZK under a one-third profit-sharing agreement, these figures were not confirmed. The discrepancy arose because the initial estimate included bitcoins that had remained dormant since 2016. Consequently, the final figure used for the calculation was 1,562 bitcoins, of which the state received 468.468.

When notary Lubomír Mika and Deputy Minister Daňhel arrived at the scene, forensic expert Jiří Berger informed them that he had already opened the wallet in the presence of Jiřikovský and his attorney (Kárim Titz). The wallet allegedly contained 1,562 bitcoins (approximately 3 billion CZK), a claim verified on blockchain and supported by the donor's screenshot. The value of the 30% donation was subsequently calculated based on this figure. According to Daňhel, it was "explained to them" that the technology was obsolete, requiring 30 hours to become operational. The expert and the donor reportedly began the process before the other invitees arrived so that the notary and ministry representatives would not have to "sit there for so long." Investigations by Seznam Zprávy revealed that the expert was paid by Jiřikovský's attorney, Titz, based on an agreement with the Ministry of Justice, which had initially contacted the forensic expert on 20 February 2025.

An additional witness—a representative of the Office for Government Representation in Property Affairs (ÚZSVM), which operates under the Ministry of Finance of the Czech Republic—was intended to be present during the handover. However, the Office declined to participate, citing a lack of competence for such activities. Consequently, the Ministry received a donation of 468 bitcoins, (Note: More precisely 468.468, according to the deed of gift (stipulated as 30% of 1,561.560).) which, as of May 2025, was valued at approximately one billion CZK. The bitcoins were transferred to a crypto wallet held by the UZSVM, as the Ministry of Justice did not possess one. Although Decroix pledged to release the auditor's report, her handling of the matter raised concerns regarding transparency due to repeated failures to publish the audit text. This constituted a breach of a prior coalition condition established during a vote of no confidence in Fiala administration.

Titz later maintained that the transaction agreement concerned only a single wallet containing 1,561 BTC. However, the Ministry received bitcoins linked to the Nucleus marketplace, which held over 5,300 BTC; of these, 3,855.15 BTC have remained untouched since 2016, and are unrelated to the transaction.

== Sale of bitcoins ==
The Ministry sold the acquired bitcoins in an auction at the end of March. In May 2025, when questioned by journalists, Minister Blažek described the transaction as "ultra-legal" or "ultra-clean." The successful bidders who purchased the bitcoins from the ministry discovered their illegal origin only after attempting to use them at exchanges, where the funds were subsequently seized.

== Identification of Bitcoin origin ==
Jiřikovský personally attempted to liquidate Bitcoin worth 120 million CZK at the Prague-based cryptocurrency exchange Bit.plus. Using the independent blockchain analysis tool Chainalysis, the exchange determined that the Bitcoin originated from a wallet associated with the illegal market Nucleus, a platform known for the trade of weapons and narcotics. The exchange conducted this verification in compliance with cryptocurrency regulations and anti-money laundering (AML) legislation.

During the process, Jiřikovský presented contract with the Ministry of Justice claiming ownership of two billion CZK in Bitcoin (indicating that the Ministry had been aware since May 26 that the funds were of illicit origin). Due to the suspicious nature of both the Bitcoin and the provided contract, the exchange reported the transaction to Financial Analytical Office (FAÚ), the Czech Republic's financial intelligence unit, on March 28. The FAÚ subsequently filed a criminal complaint with the police on April 1 (though, according to reporting by Seznam Zprávy, police were already investigating the matter by that time). Law enforcement subsequently ordered the "freezing" of the Bitcoin by instructing exchanges to prevent any further liquidation.

This discovery established a direct link between Jiřikovský and the Nucleus marketplace. Prior to late May 2025, during the investigation into Jiřikovský's involvement in the Sheep Marketplace case, for which he had already served a sentence, authorities had not pursued potential connections between him and Nucleus.

== Resignation of Minister Blažek ==
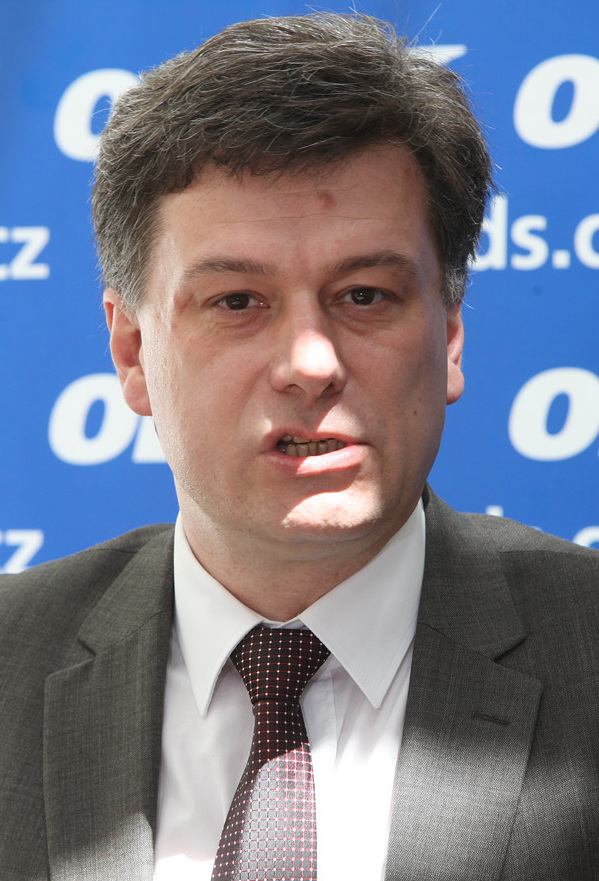
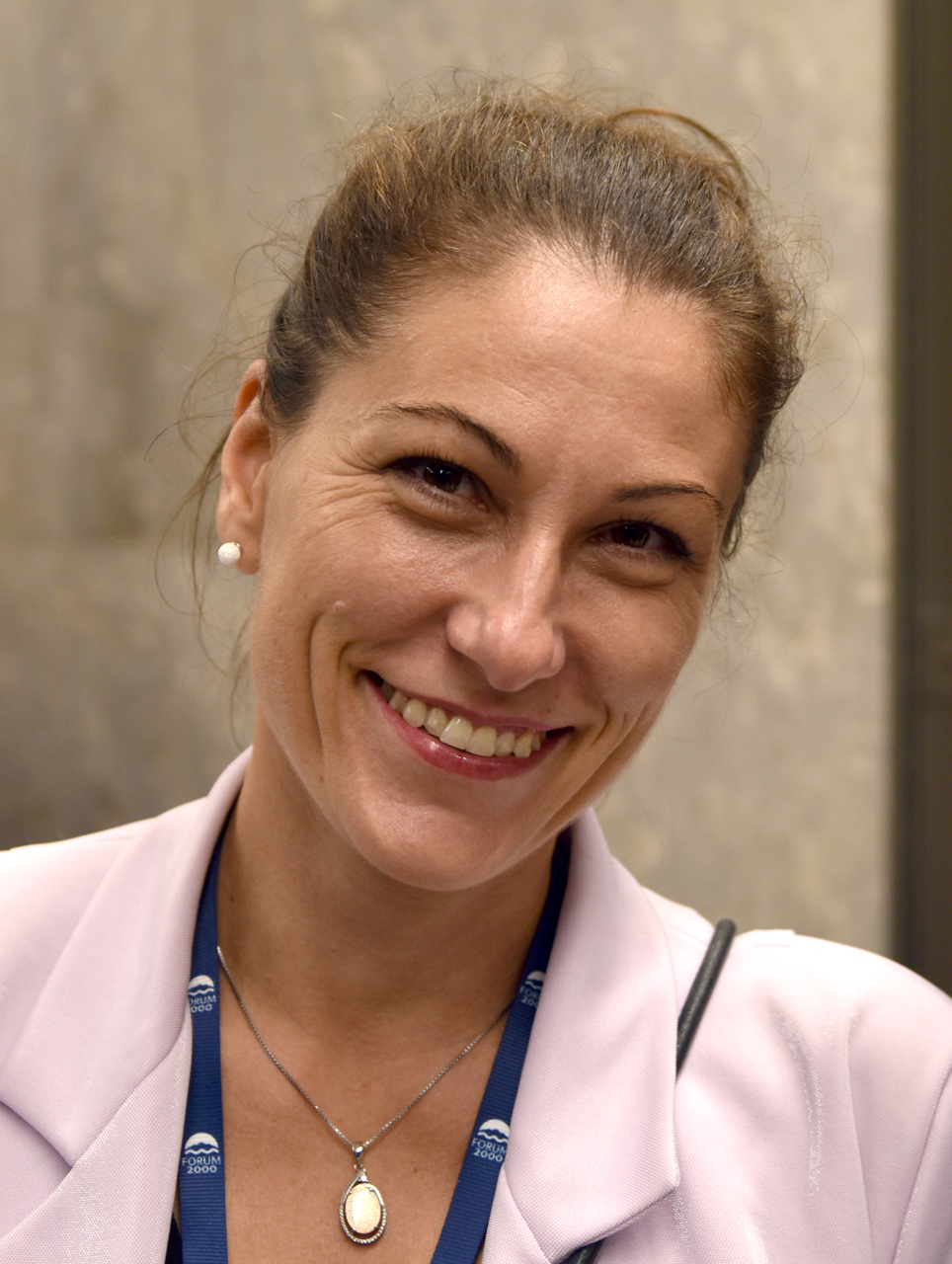
Minister of Justice Pavel Blažek (left) resigned from the government following a scandal; he was succeeded by Eva Decroix (right).

After media scrutiny, Minister Blažek resigned on 30 May 2025, citing a desire to avoid compromising the governing coalition's standing four months ahead of the parliamentary elections. Blažek's deputy, Radomír Daňhel, also stepped down from his position. In response to the developments, Prime Minister Fiala announced that he would convene the National Security Council to address the situation.

== Bitcoin confiscation ==
=== Seizure and disclosure ===
The National Headquarters Against Organized Crime (NCOZ) seized the first 50 bitcoins on 4 April 2025; however, the Ministry of Justice did not officially learn of this until May 26, when Jiřikovský's lawyer, Kárim Titz, sent the seizure protocol to the ministry. The Ministry of Justice reportedly experienced urgent internal communications regarding the bitcoins' legal status and origin verification. A chronological overview published by Eva Decroix describes urgent concern within the ministry. The case was made public on 28 May 2025.

==== Sale of seized Bitcoins ====
Kirill Juran, legal representative of two clients who received the bitcoins from the state, said his clients did not receive any information from the state regarding the origin of the cryptocurrency coins. The purchase agreement did not contain information about the addresses from which they originated. The clients did not receive the full amount from the state on 11 June 2025. Juran pointed out that the state did not want to issue another purchase agreement to complete the transfer of the entire amount. At the same time, he criticized the statement that no one had been harmed in the case, arguing that, the people who bought bitcoins from the state were the most harmed. He did not rule out legal proceedings against the state for the damage incurred, which he estimated at half a billion Czech koruna, depending on the market price of bitcoin.

==== Legal disputes and buyer claims ====
According to Juran, his clients did not know beforehand which bitcoin addresses the coins would arrive from. If his clients sued the state for "defective performance", he believes it would create a new form of Czech case law. In an interview with Echo24, Juran confirmed that on June 16, 2025, the state was in default on a payment of 60 BTC. Juran described the publication of the names of his clients and Jiřikovský's family members in the Czech media as "completely outrageous."

==== Concerns over origin and legality ====
Decroix noted three legal opinions that the state should not dispose of the bitcoins remaining with the Ministry of Justice from unfinished auctions. The lawyers justified their opinions by citing the increased risk that the coins originated from criminal activity. Two law firms identified the darknet marketplace Nucleus Market as the source of the bitcoins. The buyers complained to the office about possible defects in the bitcoins and called on it to deliver bitcoins without legal defects. Juran's clients had purchased 160 bitcoins from the state at auction but failed to receive delivery. Juran quantified their damages (including the purchase price paid but not fulfilled, plus statutory interest) at tens of millions of Czech Koruna, contrasting sharply with Decroix's earlier statements that no one had been harmed. The legal representative of the two buyers argued for the delivery of bitcoins to his clients because no one had disputed the validity of the purchase agreement. He stated that his clients wanted bitcoins without defects. When asked whether the ministry would have to purchase new "clean bitcoins" to satisfy the persons represented, Juran replied, "That is the ministry's problem. When we conclude a contract for a thousand rolls, you don't need to care where I get them. But you want rolls that are neither hard nor moldy."

==== Further confiscation and negotiations ====
Journalist Petra Jamořská said that if the illegal origins of the bitcoins is proven, any financial settlement between the state and Juran's clients could result in losses for the state. Juran said the dispute could be resolved by the end of August 2025. He did not rule out filing another lawsuit if the state failed to deliver the bitcoins.

The remaining undelivered bitcoins were confiscated by law enforcement on 15 August 2025. Juran compared the police seizure to "throwing a grenade" into buyer negotiations. His clients learned of the seizure from the ministry, not the police. Juran initially expected an agreement with the state within two weeks of Jiřikovský's arrest but later changed his view, citing the seizure by NCOZ officers as the cause. The buyers' lawyer said his clients could reach an agreement with the state by the end of September 2025, when it should be clear whether a deal is possible. The third buyer acquiring bitcoin from the state at auction was the Sigil cryptocurrency fund, managed by Pavel Stehno in August 2025. Stehno said of the negotiations with the state, "The negotiations are constructive, no one is confiscating anything from us."

== Effects on the blockchain ==
Lupa.cz editor Martin Drtina, traced blockchain activity related to the scandal and identified a previously dormant wallet associated with the Nucleus marketplace, which became active in March 2025 and made transactions during those two days. Furthermore, the editor clarified the identity of the expert from the donation agreement as Jiří Berger. On 7 March 2025, 0.468 BTC was transferred to a Trezor T hardware wallet owned by the Office for the Representation of the State in Property Matters. Later that same day, a total of 468 BTC was sent from the same address in four separate transactions. 22 minutes after the notary's record was completed, an additional 151 BTC was transferred from the same address to other addresses, where, apart from another trio of transfers, they remain to this day. According to Drtina, he clearly demonstrated that the individual who transferred the funds to the state controlled all wallets connected to the Nucleus marketplace.

A later chronological analysis, Drtina proved that after Jiřikovský's arrest and the house search on 12 April 2016, a third person (or group of persons) transferred funds from Nucleus wallets the following night. In the fourth text, Drtina found that someone had been trying to exchange the bitcoin from this day's donation on Czech and foreign cryptocurrency exchanges, including the Kraken exchange. The unknown owners of the cryptocurrency wallets were trying to regroup the coins using bitcoin mixers.

== Minister's resignation and political fallout ==
Justice Minister Pavel Blažek accepted the donation without thoroughly investigating its origins. He later stated that he believed it to be an act of restitution by Jiříkovský and did not anticipate any legal complications. However, the lack of due diligence prompted public criticism and allegations of potential money laundering. Facing mounting pressure and seeking to avoid further damage to the government's reputation, Blažek resigned on May 31, 2025.

The scandal intensified political tensions, with opposition parties calling for additional resignations, including those of Prime Minister Petr Fiala and Finance Minister Zbyněk Stanjura, alleging they were aware of the donation and its questionable origins.

On 19 June 2025, the government survived a no-confidence vote triggered by the scandal.

== Ongoing investigations ==
The High Prosecutor's Office in Olomouc has initiated an investigation into the case, examining potential charges of abuse of official authority and money laundering. The police's organized crime unit is also involved in probing the circumstances surrounding the donation and its acceptance by the ministry. Officials at the National Organized Crime Control Center have requested the cooperation of the FBI to jointly investigate Jiříkovský's connection to the dark web marketplace Nucleus Market. On 11 June 2025, an internal audit committee of the Financial Analysis Authority reviewed the agency's handling of the case and concluded that its procedures had been followed correctly.

On 5 June 2025, Neovlivni.cz wrote that Jiříkovský was able to travel to Asia because he had not been charged at the time. Later, it was discovered that he was in Taiwan. Jiříkovský stated that he intended to return in the second half of June.

== Reactions ==
=== Domestic ===
Czech political analyst Lukáš Valeš described the Czech Republic as a "banana republic" to the foreign press. Another political analyst, Jan Kubáček, commented on the case, saying, "The state administration is either incompetent or unethical." Kubáček was not impressed by the government's unclear communication about the situation and unprofessional conduct among government officials. During an interview with CNN Prima News, Kubáček criticized the slow handling of the case by Petr Fiala and said that the case could be characterized as one of the "demons of the 1990s". Kubáček mentioned that STAN's departure from Fiala's government would either be expected by voters or necessary for the party to clarify its position against ministers from ODS. Political analyst Josef Mlejnek expressed that the case would weaken both the electoral coalition Spolu and Fiala himself. "I never dreamed it was possible. That the Justice Ministry would take and legalize money from a convicted person without knowing the origin of that money," political scientist Vladimíra Dvořáková commented on the case.

==== Government stability and leadership concerns ====
Political analyst Daniel Šárovec suggested that Blažek, Fiala, and Stanjura had underestimated the legal and reputational risks of accepting the donation without proper verification. Šárovec noted that the case has the potential to undermine the legitimacy of the government. He then pointed out that interior minister Vít Rakušan's statement about remaining in Fiala's cabinet is limited to "right here and right now." He speculated that the political leaders were prompted for their word because they wanted to buy time. Šárovec noted that Eva Decroix, who replaced Blažek as justice minister, was merely a "bridging minister."

==== Media commentary and historical comparisons ====
Political commentator Thomas Kulidakis drew parallels to previous ODS scandals, including the controversial coupon privatization scheme and allegations against former advisor to the Prime Minister Nagyová. Political commentator Kateřina Perknerová described the case as an event with an unusual number of coincidences. Journalist Petr Honzejk commented on Blažek's departure from his position as minister, saying that there was no society-wide catharsis that would restore trust in politics. Publicist David Klimeš commented on the development of the case, saying that more information had become public. He also expressed the opinion that the story of the banana republic—the Czech Republic—is unfolding.

===== Allegations of prior knowledge and internal communications =====
Commentator Miroslav Korecký highlighted communications between Decroix and Blažek regarding Deputy Dvořák's emails, suggesting prior knowledge of the donation. The email was supposed to prove that Dvořák should have known about the whole case from the beginning. Korecký used the phrase "the shredders will go there" for the supposed developments at the Ministry of Justice. He also expressed his conviction that neither TOP 09 nor KDU-ČSL could leave the cabinet because they were on the brink of dissolution. He described Fiala's TV appearance as the speech of a "communist puppet."

==== Public opinion and electoral impact ====
Pavel Rychetský described the case as a cause of shifts in public opinion and the decline in popular support for the SPOLU coalition. He denied that Jiřikovský's actions were entirely charitable. He also pointed out that, as of 28 June 2025, the state's consideration for the donation was still unknown. Political commentator Jindřich Šídlo warned that inadequate media explanation of cryptocurrency terminology and technical concepts hindered public understanding of the scandal's significance.

==== Reactions of Czech politicians ====
Minister of Agriculture Marek Výborný (KDU-ČSL) said that Czechs are far more interested in affordable housing than in the bitcoin scandal. Interior Minister Vít Rakušan (STAN) said that he did not intend to overthrow the government of Petr Fiala at the start of June 2025. Subsequently, Rakušan described Eva Decroix's (ODS) statement that Deputy Minister Karel Dvořák (STAN) was implicated because Decroix knew about the donation in advance as an effort to cast suspicion on as many officials as possible. MEP Jan Farský (STAN) initially supported Rakušan's more conciliatory tone towards remaining in Fiala's cabinet. Later, Farský did not rule out a possible departure of STAN from Fiala's government. Farský also called for a 14-day ultimatum for ODS members to explain the case as a whole. "The bitcoin case of Minister Blažek is a disgrace with the potential to jeopardize the Czech Republic's credit rating. It damages trust at home and abroad," said MEP Danuše Nerudová (STAN). According to participants, tensions between ODS and STAN coalition partners surfaced during a meeting on 10 June 2025, where Prime Minister Fiala reportedly left the room multiple times, apparently distressed by the scandal's political implications.

Andrej Babiš, the chairman of the opposition ANO 2011 movement, commented on the case, saying that it was a criminal act that bore the hallmarks of money laundering by the state. He described the case as the biggest corruption scandal in the history of the Czech Republic. Babiš expressed the opinion that by dismissing Blažek, ODS representatives made Don Pablo of Brno (the media nickname of Blažek) a metaphorical scapegoat. Subsequently, Babiš gave a speech in France on Monday, 9 June 2025. Speaking in French at an event of the European faction Patriots for Europe, Babiš accused the Fiala cabinet of corruption in connection with the bitcoin scandal. Alena Schillerová, chairwoman of the ANO 2011 parliamentary club, commented on the case by saying that the ministers shook hands with the mafia.

==== Reaction of the Czech public ====
The bitcoin scandal did not affect the electoral preferences of the SPOLU coalition. According to the director of the STEM agency, Jaromír Mazák, this happened because people need more time to form their own opinions on more complex cases, or because the voters of SPOLU view Blažek's resignation as a sufficient response to the case. According to another survey of voter preferences, the electoral core and potential remained stable after the outbreak of the case. Analysts compiling the IPSOS election survey up to 1 June 2025 stated that the predicted election result of the SPOLU coalition was within the statistical margin of error. Data scientists from Median found that for almost 30% of the original voters of the SPOLU coalition, the scandal has been the primary reason for the fall of the government of Petr Fiala.

Representatives of the Czech non-profit organization Milion chvilek pro demokracii said in their statement on the Bitcoin case that they appreciated the efforts of the new Minister Decroix to conduct a transparent investigation into the case. They criticized the lack of concrete steps in dealing with the case. Earlier, the "Momentarians" pointed out that the case is an opportunity to test the personal credibility of Fiala and called for "political accountability" for Finance Minister Stanjura.

According to a survey by the STEM agency, two-thirds of Czechs considered the case to be serious in the second half of June 2025. In response to the case, the SPOLU coalition began to lose electoral support. According to STEM analysts, the more serious cases can be expected to have a more gradual effect over time.

Journalists from the Seznam Zprávy newsroom accessed an internal poll of electoral preferences commissioned by the SPOLU coalition. The poll shows that the coalition has lost the support of its disappointed supporters from the last election because of the case. Sociologist Jan Herzmann commented on the poll: "The case has definitely given SPOLU a leg up in its quest for electoral victory." A third of the coalition's original voters agreed on the need for other ministers to resign and approximately one in four of the coalition's original voters wanted Fiala's cabinet to fall. David Brudňák, professionally known as Roman Týc, stated that Jiřikovský sought state certification to validate the legitimacy of the bitcoins; however, he now purportedly fears for his life after allegedly defrauding individuals linked to the criminal underworld. Brudňák also highlighted that the Czech public predominantly relies on Czech Wikipedia as their primary source of information regarding the case.

=== International ===
Editors of Politico predicted that the case may help Andrej Babiš win the upcoming parliamentary elections. Petr Kaniok, a university teacher from Masaryk University, told the server that government politicians managed to cover up the case because Blažek resigned as minister. The journalist Jan Lopatka noted for Reuters that Fiala's government should not face a vote of no confidence because it held a majority of 104 MPs. The AP journalists said that the then-government opposition accused the government of money laundering. The journalist Jean-Baptiste Chastand of the French daily Le Monde noted the shift in government officials' communication from "giving money away for free" to Blažek's removal from office. The motive of fear of the Czech Republic's failure as a money-laundering state was elaborated on by Aneta Zachová for the European news website Euractiv, who shared President Petr Pavel's concerns about the weakening trust in the rule of law.

The journalist Anton Filippov from the Ukrainian newspaper European Pravda stated that the case could jeopardize Czech assistance in the war in Ukraine. He further speculated about the weakening of Fiala within ODS and the possibility of him being replaced by Martin Kuba, which would lead to unpredictable changes in the relationship between Ukraine and the Czech Republic. The editor Albin Sybera of the German agency Bne IntelliNews noted Zbyněk Stanjura's reluctance to resign from the position of Minister of Finance after the scandal, even though Blažek had informed him about the donation in advance. Sybera also quoted the Czech economist Richard Hindls, citing his interview with Czech Radio. Hindls stated that this type of transaction involving cryptocurrencies, including their sale at a state auction, would not be possible in the private sector due to state regulation.

== Impact on individual stakeholders ==
The case had a direct or indirect impact on its individual stakeholders over the time.

=== Zdislava Pokorná ===
Prior to the publication of her first report, Pokorná received several phone calls from unknown numbers, which she believed were linked to Blažek and the "Brno cells" of the Civic Democratic Party (ODS). Following the publication, Pokorná faced public attacks and ridicule for her role in uncovering the case. The discourse subsequently shifted from the factual aspects of the case to the author's personal life and her motivations for publishing the reports. Regarding the development of the case, she stated her belief that the events were pre-planned.

=== Tomáš Jiřikovský ===
Jiřikovský initially communicated with the journalist Pokorná in Břeclav. Following the publication of the first article, Jiřikovský flew abroad. According to the news server Neovlivni.cz, Jiřikovský chose Asia as his destination. His ex-wife spoke out regarding his departure, stating she feared for herself, her children, and their father. Before leaving the country, Jiřikovský managed to file a criminal complaint regarding the leak of information from the criminal file. At the same time, he was under police protection while on probation following a previous release from prison. Media reports and government officials offered conflicting information regarding Jiřikovský's exact location in Asia. Journalist Pokorná stated that Jiřikovský and his girlfriend were in the Philippines. However, Czech security services tracked his movements in Taiwan in June 2025. Jiřikovský himself promised to return to the Czech Republic in the second half of June 2025.

Jiřikovský eventually returned to the Czech Republic in the second half of July 2025. At that time, it was unclear whether he intended to remain in the country or travel abroad again. Upon his arrival, he was spotted in Břeclav, where he evaded journalists' questions by fleeing in a waiting car with a driver.

During a police raid on the night of August 14–15, 2025, Jiřikovský fled to the roof of his property in Břeclav, where he was apprehended by officers from the National Organized Crime Agency (NCOZ). Jiřikovský had climbed onto the roof with his children; his ex-wife was inside the building during the operation. He only descended from the roof after officers convinced him of their professional identity. During the incident, Jiřikovský was heard shouting: "That's not the police, I just called them." Officers discovered two boxes filled with euros worth tens of millions of Czech korunas. The raid was conducted on suspicion of money laundering and illegal drug trafficking. Jiřikovský was charged immediately following his arrest. It was later revealed that Jiřikovský had an appointment to provide a statement to the police on Friday, August 15, and that officers had accessed his roof via a neighboring house.

It's the police—heads up, there are kids present. — A resident of the adjacent property addressing NCOZ officers during the apprehension of Jiřikovský

Following the raid, Jiřikovský was transported to the Brno headquarters of the National Center Against Organized Crime (NCOZ). After two and a half hours, he was relocated to an undisclosed location. Prosecutors moved for pre-trial detention, citing significant flight risk. Jiřikovský faced a potential prison sentence of three to ten years. Two days after his arrest, a Brno judge remanded Jiřikovský into custody to prevent him from fleeing abroad, obstructing the investigation, or continuing criminal activity. Although Jiřikovský appealed the ruling, the appeal did not have a suspensory effect. The Brno Regional Court received his complaint on September 2, 2025, but subsequently dismissed it on September 19. In December 2025, the court convened to review the continued necessity of his detention.

Reports surfaced that following his initial contact with the police, Jiřikovský was offered a plea deal. Officers allegedly pressured the programmer to provide names of Civic Democratic Party (ODS) politicians involved in the case, reportedly threatening him with an 18-year sentence if he failed to cooperate. These allegations of misconduct were investigated by the Internal Control Department of the Police Presidium. In November 2025, Jiřikovský was transferred from Brno to the Pankrác Prison in Prague. His legal team petitioned the Supreme Public Prosecutor's Office to investigate the move, characterizing it as a form of psychological pressure intended to isolate him from his family and counsel. They further criticized the logistical inefficiency of the transfer, noting that Jiřikovský had to be transported back and forth multiple times for detention hearings in Brno.

The scale of the police operation caused consternation for locals. A neighbor described the late-night raid as resembling "Western film" (Note: Constitutional Court Justice David Uhlíř—who collaborated with Decroix to investigate the case but resigned after uncovering what journalists described as "skeletons in the closet"—likened the situation at the Ministry of Justice to Hollywood movie. Despite failing to meet the terms of cooperation publicly presented during negotiations with Decroix, Uhlíř received a payment of 160,000 CZK.) and expressed frustration over officers climbing onto his roof. Media outlets also highlighted the plight of two tradesmen who, having been in the middle of renovating Jiřikovský's kitchen during the raid, were unable to retrieve their tools from the cordoned property.

In December 2025, the Supreme Public Prosecutor's Office dismissed Jiřikovský's appeal against his money laundering charges. (Note: Officers from the National Organized Crime Agency (NCOZ) utilized the large language model chatbot ChatGPT to draft non-existent legal provision. Consequently, Jiřikovský was indicted for an offense that was not legally in force at the time of the alleged act. The error was overlooked by two lower courts in Brno.) Furthermore, although Brno prosecutors reportedly cited a legal provision that had not yet entered into force at the time of the filing, the Constitutional Court rejected his complaint against the lower courts' decisions, ensuring he remained in custody. During a high-security hearing in December 2025, the Brno Municipal Court ruled that his detention should continue.

In January 2026, the Constitutional Court rejected a motion seeking the return of 50 Bitcoins seized during the investigation. Later that month, the Brno Regional Court dismissed another appeal, upholding the decision to keep the programmer in custody. By March 2026, prosecutors expanded the indictment to include charges of drug trafficking on the darknet. To gather evidence, investigators coordinated with authorities in Sweden, Japan, and United States. That same month, Constitutional Court Justice Lucie Dolanská Bányaiová reaffirmed the flight risk, noting that even financial bail offer would not mitigate the risk of Jiřikovský fleeing or reoffending. A further hearing regarding the extension of his detention held for mid-April 2026 at the Brno Municipal Court. The court remanded Jiřikovský in custody, citing him as a flight risk and noting the potential for recidivism. Prosecutors subsequently expanded the indictment to include further drug-related offenses. As of April 2026, Jiřikovský faced a total of 30 years in prison.

[Titz] is certainly not defending your brother's interests; rather, he is defending the interests of Mr. Blažek. Your brother is not in this alone, but it would be a pity if the others were to slip through the cracks. Your brother was not capable of orchestrating this on his own; there are other people behind it. — The second lead investigator to Jiřikovský's mother and brother on the stairs

In July 2026, the Constitutional Court of the Czech Republic annulled a lower court ruling regarding Tomáš Jiřikovský's pre-trial detention due to procedural violations of his right to judicial protection, though he remained in custody as the Court rejected the remainder of his constitutional complaint ahead of the August 14, 2026, statutory deadline for his detention. The filing of the indictment drew sharp criticism from both the defendants, who cited violations of their procedural rights, and their legal counsel, who objected to the inability to repeatedly cross-examine key witnesses.

=== Kárim Titz ===
Acting as Jiřikovský's legal counsel, Titz was the first to approach Ministry of Justice officials with the offer of a donation. The attorney was present during the opening of the Bitcoin wallet on 7 March 2025. Prior to the Bitcoin case, Titz had visited Minister Pavel Blažek at the Ministry on several occasions. After the wallet was accessed, Titz acquired land in Lelekovice valued at over CZK 11.6 million. After the acceptance of the donation, the European Justice Organization initiated an investigation into Titz on suspicion of fraud, money laundering, failure to prevent a crime, and other related offences.

In June 2025, the Czech Bar Association began examining whether Titz had violated anti-money laundering (AML) legislation during the facilitation of the donation. In March 2026, the Association filed a disciplinary complaint against him for failing to rigorously verify the origin of the cryptocurrency and for neglecting to report the transfer as a suspicious transaction. In response to the complaint, Titz began transferring ownership of his real estate holdings to his wife. The filings with the Cadastre of the Czech Republic occurred one day after the charges against Jiřikovský were expanded.

== See also ==
- 2025 Czech parliamentary election
- Bitcoin
- Cabinet of Petr Fiala
- Investigation of 2025 Czech government Bitcoin scandal
