= Robert Pelikán =

Czech lawyer and politician

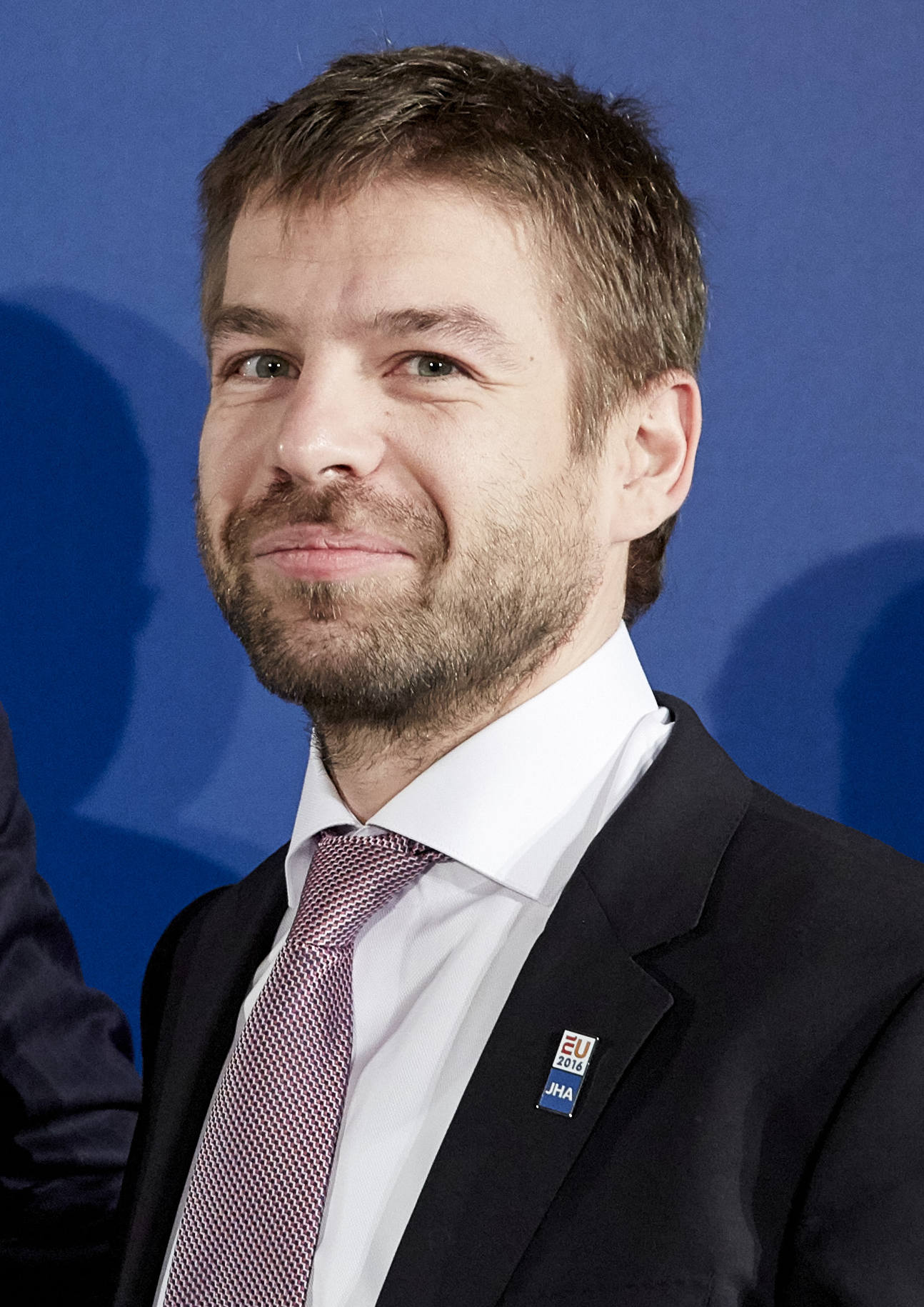

Minister of Justice
- In office 12 March 2015 – 27 June 2018
- Prime Minister: Bohuslav Sobotka; Andrej Babiš
- Preceded by: Helena Válková
- Succeeded by: Taťána Malá

Chairman of the Government Legislative Council
- In office 13 December 2017 – 27 June 2018
- Prime Minister: Andrej Babiš
- Preceded by: Jan Chvojka
- Succeeded by: Taťána Malá

Member of the Chamber of Deputies
- In office 21 October 2017 – 19 June 2018

Personal details
- Born: 18 October 1979 (age 46) Prague, Czechoslovakia
- Party: Non-partisan, nominated by ANO 2011
- Education: Charles University

Robert Pelikán (born 18 October 1979) is a Czech lawyer and politician who served as Minister of Justice from 2015 to 2018.

== Biography ==
=== Legal career ===
Pelikán studied at the Faculty of Law of the Charles University in Prague. He began his professional career in 2002 as a Junior Associate at the Císař, Češka, Smutný and Co. law firm. After completing a six-month professional internship at the General Court of the European Union in Luxembourg in 2006 and passing the Bar exam in 2007, Pelikán joined the international law firm Linklaters, where he practised as an Attorney until 2009. Pelikán co-founded the Vrána & Pelikán law firm the same year, becoming a partner until 2014, when he left the firm, sold his share in Vrána & Pelikán, and suspended his attorney practice – before entering the state administration.

Pelikán's fields as an attorney were competition, corporate and civil law, as well as dispute resolution.

=== Political career ===
On 12 March 2015, Pelikán was appointed the sixteenth Minister of Justice of the Czech Republic, succeeding Helena Válková. He was criticized by Pavel Zeman, Supreme Public Prosecutor of the Czech Republic, for his plan to increase state executive control over the Prosecutor's Offices.

At the 2017 legislative elections, Pelikán was elected as a member of the Chamber of Deputies. On 7 April 2018, Pelikán announced that he would leave politics and resign from all executive posts, citing the significant differences of opinion between himself and his party. He remained in the post until 27 June 2018, when a new government was appointed.

=== Post-political career ===
In October 2018, Pelikán joined the international law firm Wolf Theiss as a Counsel and a member of the newly-established regional Corporate Investigations practice.
