= Action Plan against Disinformation =

Document prepared in 2022 by government agent Michal Klíma

Action Plan against Disinformation (Czech: Akční plán pro čelení dezinformacím) was a material that was prepared by the government commissioner for media and disinformation Michal Klíma and his team of experts at the government office on behalf of the Cabinet of Petr Fiala. Media learned about the material on December 27, 2022. The strategy proposes possible ways of blocking disinformation, sanctioning its publishers and prosecuting them authors and distributors, but also financial support of "correct media" with tens of millions of crowns per year. The government terminated cooperation with Michal Klíma on February 15, 2023, with immediate effect and abolished the position of government commissioner for media and disinformation, which he had held since the end of March 2022, and transferred the disinformation agenda to the government's national security advisor Tomáš Pojar. It was the day after it received a sharply disapproving open letter by the Union of Publishers.

== Purpose, history and content of the proposal ==
According to Michal Klíma, the action plan followed process already started by the previous government, i.e. the establishment of the department against hybrid threats and terrorism at the Ministry of the Interior and various documents that dealt with hybrid threats and disinformation such as the document of the Ministry of the Interior from the spring of 2022 about how is the Czech Republic prepared to face waves of targeted disinformation intended to change the thinking of the population in relation to the state establishment which is according to Klíma mainly spread from Russia or China. Demand for a systemic solution intensified following the Russian invasion of Ukraine on February 24, 2022, when some sites were shut down with no legislation to back such a move.

The draft of the plan leaked to the public through an article in Deník N on December 27, 2022, stating that an expert group under Klíma's leadership submitted the final version of the plan to the government, but the government, through its spokesman Václav Smolka, distanced itself from the plan, saying that it was only a working proposal that it has not yet been discussed by the government.

The draft that was available to the Echo24 editors at the end of December 2022, defined disinformation as "online content that threatens the sovereignty, territorial integrity, democratic foundations or internal order and security of the Czech Republic".

According to the proposal, the government would support non-profit organizations that deal with disinformation with 50 million Kč per year. It would also give 100 million Kč per year from the state budget to friendly media that would help the state in the fight against disinformation.

The draft strategy also envisaged the creation of the position of a national coordinator against disinformation.
