= Marie Benešová =

Czech politician and lawyer (1948–2024)

Minister of Justice
- In office 30 April 2019 – 17 December 2021
- Prime Minister: Andrej Babiš
- Preceded by: Jan Kněžínek
- Succeeded by: Pavel Blažek
- In office 10 July 2013 – 29 January 2014
- Prime Minister: Jiří Rusnok
- Preceded by: Pavel Blažek
- Succeeded by: Helena Válková

Chairman of the Government Legislative Council
- In office 6 May 2019 – 17 December 2021
- Prime Minister: Andrej Babiš
- Preceded by: Jan Kněžínek
- Succeeded by: Michal Šalomoun
- In office 10 July 2013 – 29 January 2014
- Prime Minister: Jiří Rusnok
- Preceded by: Petr Mlsna
- Succeeded by: Jiří Dienstbier Jr.

Member of the Chamber of Deputies
- In office 26 October 2013 – 26 October 2017

Personal details
- Born: 17 April 1948 Prague, Czechoslovakia
- Died: 11 November 2024 (aged 76)
- Party: Social Democratic Party
- Education: Charles University
- Occupation: Politician, lawyer

Marie Benešová (17 April 1948 – 11 November 2024) was a Czech politician and lawyer who served as Minister of Justice under Prime Minister Andrej Babiš from 2019 to 2021, having previously held the position between 2013 and 2014, as a part of Jiří Rusnok's Cabinet.

== Early life ==
Benešová was born on 17 April 1948. Both her parents worked in construction. In June 1966, she graduated from a secondary general education school, and afterwards, she attended the Faculty of Law, Charles University, where she graduated in 1971. After graduating, she worked at the district prosecutor's office in Kladno as a legal trainee before passing her judicial exams two years later and becoming a prosecutor for the same office. She worked there until 1991, working on general crime and later as a specialist in traffic crime. She then worked as a lawyer for the Supreme State Prosecutor.

== Career ==
From 1999 to 2005, Benešová was the Supreme State Prosecutor. Her dismissal as prosecutor is generally attributed to a quarrel between her and then Minister of Justice Pavel Němec. This occurred because Hamid Bin Abdul Sani al-Thani, a member of the House of Thani, was arrested for child sexual abuse in the Czech Republic but Němec interfered so that al-Thani was sent to Qatar instead for a trial. Benešová argued that this threatened the independence of the Czech judicial system and that he should've been tried in the Czech Republic.

In 2006, she ran for a seat in the Senate of the Czech Republic for Chomutov representing the Czech Social Democratic Party, which she lost. However, she was then part of the shadow cabinet as the Minister of Justice.

== Personal life ==
Benešová died on 11 November 2024, at the age of 76.
