= Eva Decroix =

Czech politician (born 1982)

Eva Decroix MP
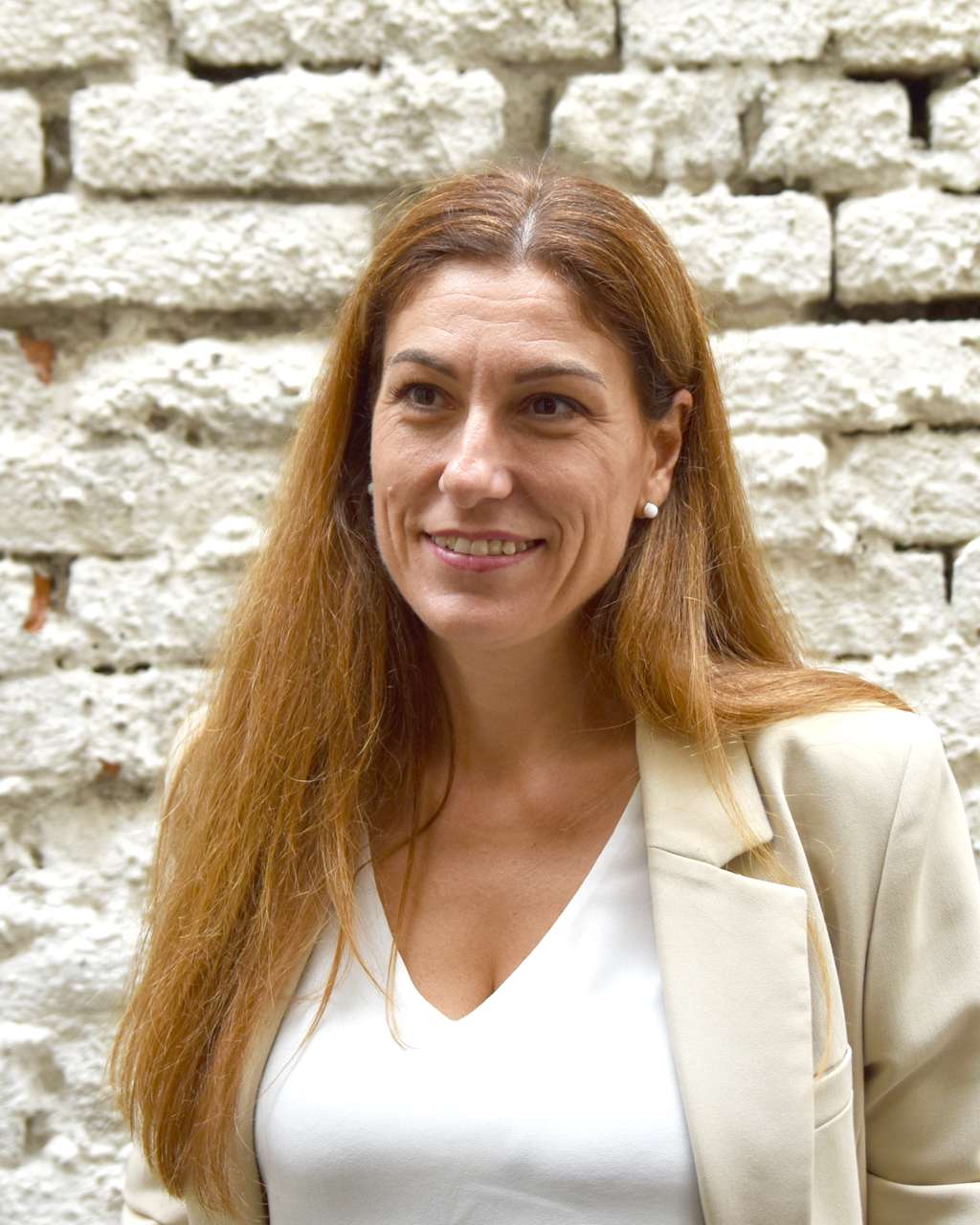
- Decroix in 2025

Minister of Justice
- In office 10 June 2025 – 15 December 2025
- Prime Minister: Petr Fiala
- Preceded by: Pavel Blažek
- Succeeded by: Jeroným Tejc

Member of the Chamber of Deputies
- Incumbent
- Assumed office 9 October 2021

Personal details
- Born: Eva Táborská; 26 May 1982 (age 44) Ostrava, Czechoslovakia
- Party: Civic Democratic Party
- Children: 2
- Education: Southern Brittany University; University of Lille; Charles University
- Website: evadecroix.cz

Eva Decroix (née Táborská, born 26 May 1982) is a Czech businesswoman, lawyer and politician who served as Minister of Justice in the Cabinet of Petr Fiala from June to December 2025.

== Early life and education ==
Decroix was born as Eva Táborská on 26 May 1982. She studied law at Southern Brittany University in Vannes and then in Lille. She runs a law firm in Jihlava and Prague and is dedicated to alternative methods of conflict resolution as a registered mediator.

== Political career ==
In 2016 Czech regional elections, Decroix ran for the Civic Democratic Party as a representative of Vysočina Regional Representative, but was not elected. She was only elected in the 2020 elections, originally being as the 12th candidate but ended in third place due to preferential votes.

Decroix failed to run for the Civic Democratic Party in the 2018 Czech municipal elections for the City Council of Jihlava. With citizen democrat Petr Laštovička resigned from his mandate at the beginning of 2020, she became the new city representative. In the 2022 municipal elections, Decroix ran for Jihlava council from the 14th place as a candidate of ODS and KDU-ČSL coalition, but was not elected.

In the 2019 European Parliament election, Decroix ran as the sixth ODS candidate, but was unsuccessful and became the third alternate.

During the 2021 Czech parliamentary election, Decroix finished second place as a member of the Civic Democratic Party in the Vysočina Region. In January 2022, she became a member of the Subcommittee for the Support of Democracy and Human Rights Abroad before serving as chairwoman the following year.

At the 31st Civic Democratic Party congress in April 2024, Decroix was elected vice-president of the party, receiving 311 votes from 528 party delegates.

On 10 June 2025, Decroix was appointed as Minister of Justice in the Cabinet of Petr Fiala. In March 2026, she criticized the Andrej Babiš cabinet's plan to seize suspicious assets without direct proof of a criminal offense. Journalists noted that she herself had previously introduced the proposal during her tenure as Minister of Justice.

== Personal life ==
Decroix is married to chef Rémy Decroix with two daughters. They split in 2025 after 25 years of relationship.

== Controversies ==
=== Senior from the photo bank supporting pension reforms ===
In March 2023, she shared ODS promotional material on her Facebook account, which included a quote next to a photo of a smiling senior citizen:

I see it the same way as the Minister of Finance. Pensioners are not bad off, I am happy. I want my children and grandchildren to have pensions too. In my area, most pensioners agree with the reduction.

— Václav P.

The post was intended to express support for the government amendment currently under discussion to reduce the indexation of pensions. The use of a photo of a man from a photo bank, which is commonly used in foreign campaigns, caught the public's attention. Decroix expressed disappointment that the use of the photo had distracted attention from the statement made by Václav, whom she said she knew and had indeed uttered the quote.

=== Inter-Parliamentary Alliance on China ===
In September 2023, the Inter-Parliamentary Alliance on China summit was held in the Chamber of Deputies. The summit was organized by Decroix, Markéta Pekarová Adamová and Pavel Fischer. Ugandan politician Lucy Akello, who advocates the death penalty for homosexuals, also attended the summit. Activist Kryštof Stupka drew attention to the connection between Decroix and Akello, who were supposed to meet at the Copenhagen Democracy Summit. Decroix described Akello as a "lovely colleague" and described her work on her Facebook page with the words: "She fights fiercely for her people, but otherwise she's a lot of fun." After criticism, Decroix deleted the photo with Akello.

=== Uncertainty over Master's degree ===
Decroix came to public attention in the Czech media after she took over the Ministry of Justice from Pavel Blažek, who resigned over the 2025 Czech government Bitcoin scandal. She initially displayed the title of Magister (Mgr.) in several places, including her professional CV and the Czech government website. Journalists from Deník N noticed that Decroix used the title Mgr. incorrectly. She studied at two universities in France, but only obtained a lower form of master's degree in the French university system. Decroix managed to complete this type of study in a record four years, even though the official programme took five years.

Upon arrival, Decroix had her foreign education nostrified at Charles University so that she could subsequently study for her PhD. Journalists also noted the strange circumstances of the nostrification of her education from France when comparing her to other Czech students who studied in France during the same time period as Decroix. Decroix had not completed the final year required for a full-fledged Master 2 legal education. She later obtained this educational level (not the title of Mgr.) in a non-legal field. After the publication of the articles concerning these irregularities, the title of Mgr. disappeared from the government's official website and from the politician's professional CV.
