= Helena Válková =

Czech politician and lawyer

Helena Válková MP
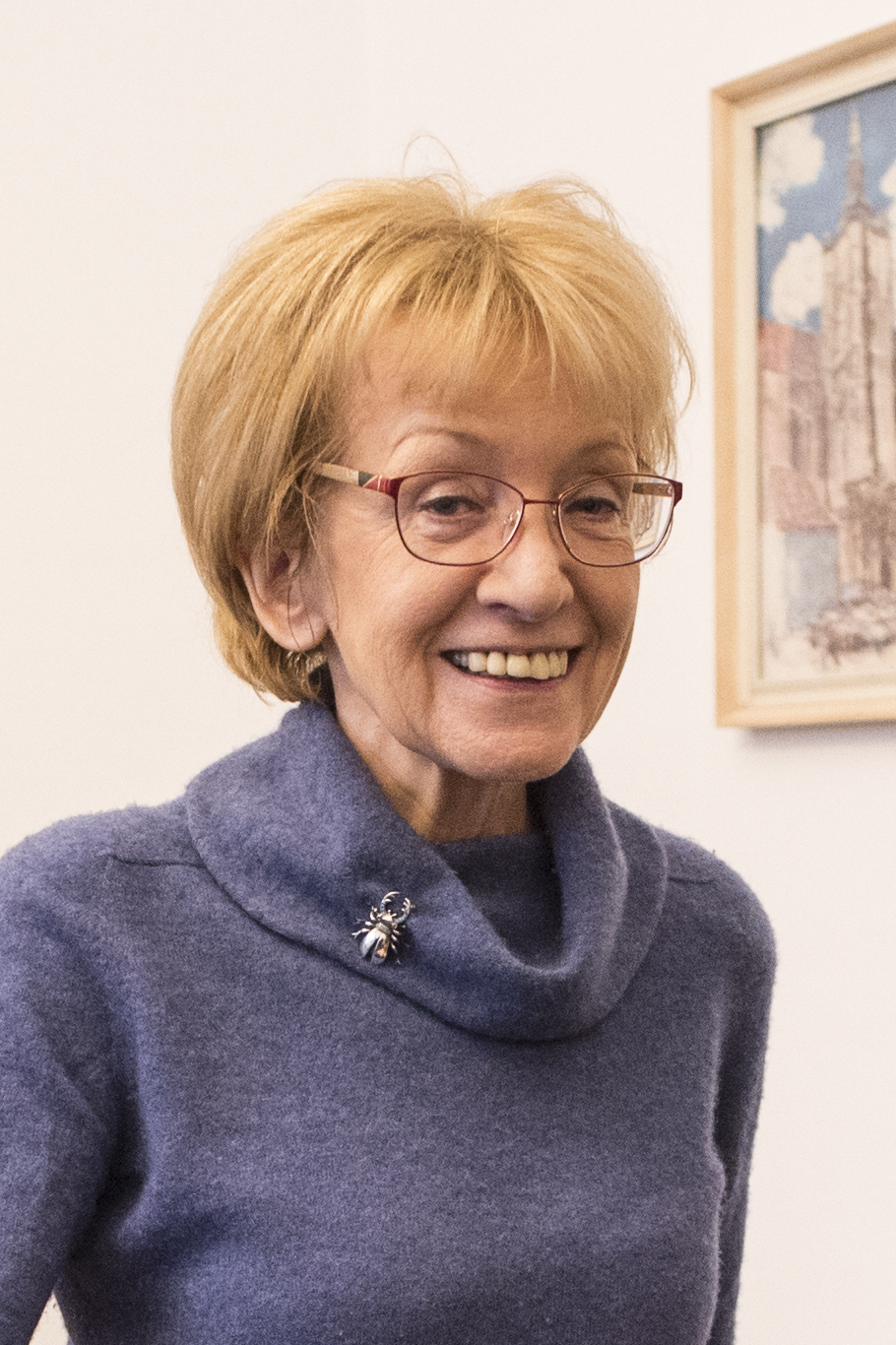
- Válková in 2019

Minister of Justice
- In office 29 January 2014 – 1 March 2015
- Prime Minister: Bohuslav Sobotka
- Preceded by: Marie Benešová
- Succeeded by: Robert Pelikán

Member of the Chamber of Deputies
- Incumbent
- Assumed office 26 October 2013

Personal details
- Born: 7 January 1951 (age 75) Chlumec nad Cidlinou, Czechoslovakia
- Education: Charles University

Helena Válková (born 7 January 1951) is a Czech politician, university professor, and lawyer, specialising in criminal law and criminology. From January 2014 until March 2015 she was the Czech Minister of Justice in the government of Bohuslav Sobotka. She was elected to the Chamber of Deputies for ANO 2011, though she is now non-partisan. On 10 February 2015, Andrej Babiš, the leader of ANO 2011, announced that Válková will be replaced in the function by the lawyer Robert Pelikán. Válková's tenure ended on 1 March.

== Life and career ==
Válková attended the Faculty of Law at Charles University in Prague, where she received her Candidate of Sciences in the field of criminal law. Between 1975 and 1988 she worked as a scientist at the Criminological Research Institute, and then until 1993 at the Institute of State and Law of the Czechoslovak Academy of Sciences. In the 1970s, while working in the Criminological Research Institute, she wrote an article "Některé poznatky z výzkumu ochranného dohledu v souvislosti s prokurátorským dozorem" ("Some findings from protective supervision research in the context of prosecution") together with the former procurator Josef Urválek, who was responsible for securing the death sentences during the show trials in the early 1950s. She also taught from 1991 at the Charles University Faculty of Philosophy, where she laid the foundations for her social work in criminal justice, and from 1993 in the Faculty of Law at the University of West Bohemia in Plzeň, where she became Head of the Criminal Law Department in 1998. She was temporarily suspended from this office in 2009 following her criticism of the faculty management. Further disagreements finally led her to leave the faculty in 2011. She gained a doctorate in Criminal Law in 2006 from the University of Trnava.

She is also a member of the Department of Public Law and Public Justice at the CEVRO Institute in Prague. In 1993 she founded the Czech branch of C. H. Beck, where she became director of publishing. She later became chief editor of the publishing schedule and of specialist magazines. She organised and took part in an international conference on criminal law and criminology, and took part in several study trips to the Max Planck Institute for Foreign and International Criminal Law in Freiburg. She was involved in writing the Juvenile Justice Law (č. 218/2003 Sb.).

Helena Válková is married with one son.

== Political career ==
Until 1989, Válková had been a member of the Communist Party of Czechoslovakia. After November 1989 she became involved with Civic Forum. In the 2013 Czech legislative election, she stood successfully for parliament for the ANO 2011 movement of Andrej Babiš, as their number two candidate for the Prague regional list. From 5 December 2013, she held the position of vice-chair of the Parliamentary Committee for Constitutional Affairs.

In January 2014 Válková was put forward as the ANO 2011 candidate for Minister of Justice in the government of Bohuslav Sobotka. She was appointed to this position on 29 January 2014. The following summer she filed an application to join the ANO movement and became a member in early 2015.

In March 2014, in an interview with the website Echo24, she was asked for her opinion on the expulsion of Germans from Czechoslovakia following World War II, and replied, "The worst. I understand that it was a reaction to what had happened to the Czechs before then, but there wasn't all that much going on in the Protectorate." This comment caused great controversy, and Válková later apologised.

At the end of May 2014, Válková became involved in a dispute with her deputy minister Hana Marvanová, caused by disagreements over reductions in lawyers' fees and the appointment of some judicial officials. Marvanová subsequently resigned. Two weeks later she entered another dispute with another deputy, Pavel Štern, over the tendering process for electronic tags for domestic prisoners. Štern refused to provide her with detailed information about the tendering process, to which he claimed she was not entitled. He subsequently consulted the anti-corruption police. Válková cancelled the tender due to doubts about transparency and removed Štern from his post. The personnel changes at the Ministry of Justice provoked a wave of anger in political circles and Prime Minister Sobotka announced, that "Should (Válková) show any further hesitation in the management of her office, it will be ČSSD as a coalition party requiring a change in the whole Ministry of Justice."

In February 2015 she announced her resignation from the post of Czech Minister for Justice, effective 1 March 2015. Responding to some articles commenting on her failure in managing the ministry, Válková said "I have begun to feel disgusted with the situation developing around me." She was replaced by Robert Pelikán.

=== Nomination for the Public Defender office ===
In December 2019, Czech President Miloš Zeman nominated her for the office of Ombudsman. In January 2020 the news website Info.cz republished and discussed an article from 1979 authored by Válková together with the communist prosecutor Josef Urválek, accusing her of defending laws used against dissidents during the normalisation era. The controversy resulted in the withdrawal of her nomination by the president.
