= Deník N =

Czech daily newspaper

- Type: Daily newspaper
- Publisher: N media a.s.
- Editor-in-chief: Pavel Tomášek
- Founded: 2018
- Political alignment: Centrism, Liberalism
- Language: Czech
- ISSN: 2571-1717
- Website: denikn.cz

Deník N is a Czech subscription-based daily newspaper and news website founded in 2018. It operates primarily as a subscription-based news website and also publishes a print edition on weekdays. It was established with support from the publisher of the Slovak newspaper Denník N, whose publisher provided its know-how and holds one-third of the voting rights in N media a.s..

Deník N has published several prominent political investigations. In 2021, it and Alarm published allegations of sexual misconduct against MP Dominik Feri, who subsequently resigned from parliament. In 2025, Deník N first reported the cryptocurrency donation that developed into the Czech government bitcoin scandal. Reporting on the affair by Deník N journalist Zdislava Pokorná was later credited by the Czech Journalism Awards with contributing significantly to the resignation of Justice Minister Pavel Blažek.

== History ==
Deník N was announced in June 2018 under the working title Nový deník. The project drew on the know-how of subscription-based model of the Slovak Denník N. The Czech founders organized their investment through Independent Press, which held the majority stake in publisher N media, while the Slovak publisher held a minority stake. Before launch, a crowdfunding campaign raised CZK 7 million and attracted 5,433 subscribers. The publication adopted the name Deník N in October 2018 and launched later that month, with a regular print edition following in January 2019.

By 2019, eight Czech investors held equal shares in Independent Press, which controlled two-thirds of N media. In 2021, the Czech investors transferred ownership of Independent Press to the newly established Independent Press Foundation, shifting control of N media from individual investors to the foundation. The Slovak publisher retained its minority stake.

N media reported its first full-year profit in 2024, when Deník N had more than 26,000 subscribers. In September 2025, it began offering some subscribers access to The New York Times and its digital products. By the end of 2025, the newspaper had more than 33,000 subscribers, up 27 percent from a year earlier, and N media recorded a second consecutive annual profit.
