= Jeroným Tejc =

Czech politician (born 1977)

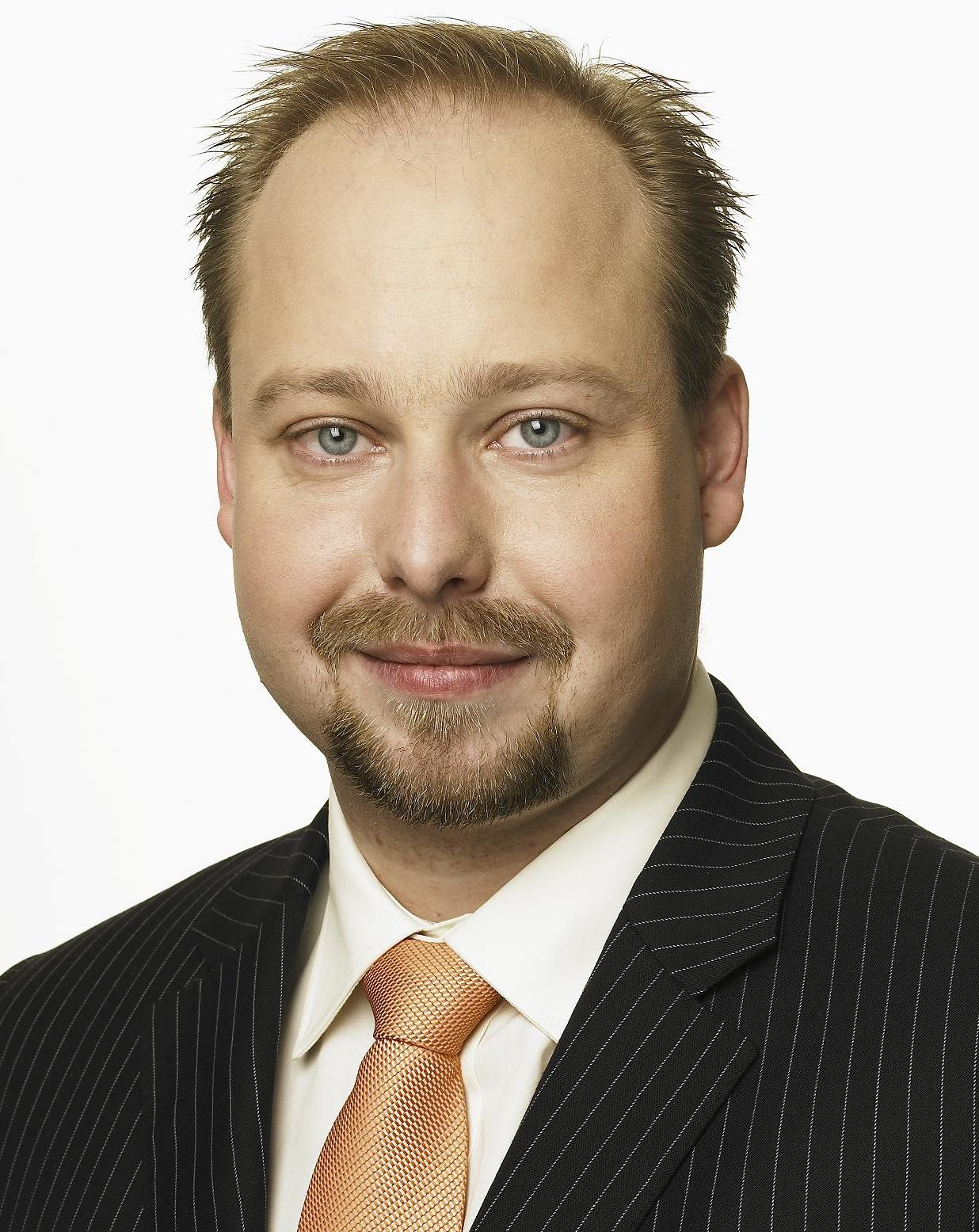
- Tejc in 2010

Minister of Justice
- Incumbent
- Assumed office 15 December 2025
- Prime Minister: Andrej Babiš
- Preceded by: Eva Decroix

Member of the Chamber of Deputies
- In office 3 June 2006 – 26 October 2017
- Constituency: South Moravian Region

Personal details
- Born: 23 August 1977 (age 49)
- Party: Independent (since 2017)
- Other political affiliations: Social Democracy (1997–2017)
- Education: Masaryk University

Jeroným Tejc (born 23 August 1977) is a Czech politician and lawyer serving as Minister of Justice in the Third cabinet of Andrej Babiš since December 2025. From 2006 to 2017, he was a member of the Chamber of Deputies for Czech Social Democratic Party. From 2018 to 2021, he served as deputy minister of justice.
