= Ministry of Justice (Czech Republic) =

Government ministry of the Czech Republic

Ministry of Justice of the Czech Republic
- Ministerstvo spravedlnosti České republiky

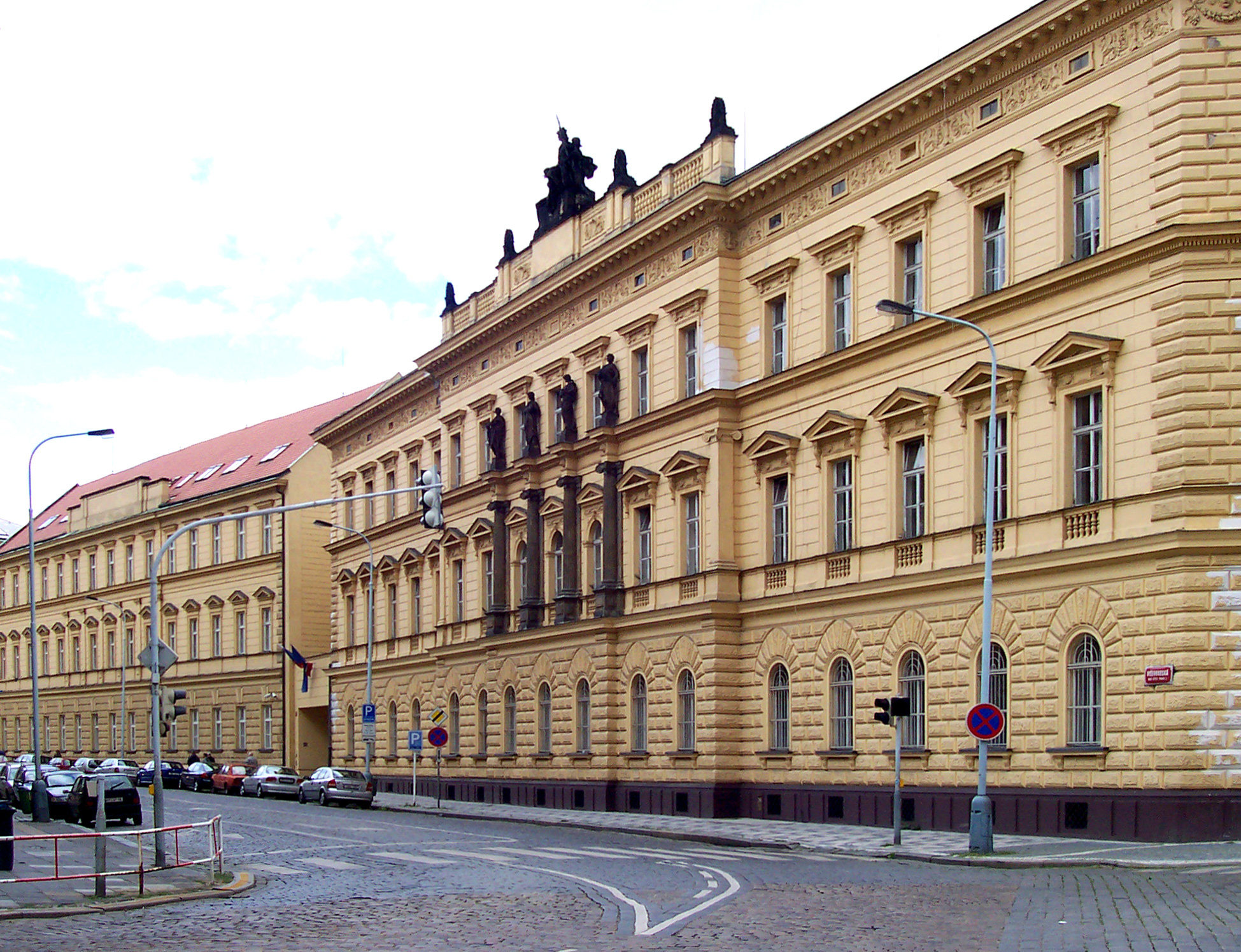

Agency overview
- Headquarters: Vyšehradská 16, 128 10 Prague 2 (Nové Město); 50°4′9.7″N 14°25′6.32″E
- Agency executive: Jeroným Tejc, Minister of Justice
- Website: msp.gov.cz

The Ministry of Justice of the Czech Republic (Czech: Ministerstvo spravedlnosti České republiky) is a government ministry of the Czech Republic.

The powers of the Ministry of Justice as defined by Section 11 of Act No. 2/1969 Coll. on Creation of Ministries and Other Central Authorities (Competencies Act) are:

It is a central authority of the state administration for courts of law and the Public Prosecutor's Office.

It gives legal opinion on credit and guarantee agreements, whose party is the Czech Republic.

It acts as a central authority of the state administration for prisons; the Prison Service of the Czech Republic is its subsidiary.

It acts as a central authority of the state administration for probation and mediation.

It represents the Czech Republic claims for breaching the Convention for the Protection of Human Rights and Fundamental Freedoms and its Protocols and the International Covenant on Civil and Political Rights and coordinates the execution of the decisions of the relevant international bodies.

== List of ministers of justice ==
=== Czechoslovakia (1918-1968) ===
- František Soukup: November 14, 1918 - July 8, 1919
- František Veselý: July 8, 1919 - May 25, 1920
- Alfred Meissner: May 25, 1920 - September 15, 1920
- Augustin Popelka: September 15, 1920 - September 26, 1921
- Josef Dolanský: September 26, 1921 - December 9, 1925
- Karel Viškovský: 9 December 1925 - 18 March 1926
- Jiří Haussmann: March 18, 1926 - October 12, 1926
- Robert Mayr-Harting: October 12, 1926 - December 7, 1929
- Alfred Meissner: December 7, 1929 - February 14, 1934
- Ivan Dérer: February 14, 1934 - September 22, 1938
- Vladimir Fajnor: 22 September 1938 - 4 October 1938 and 4 October 1938 - 14 October 1938
- Ladislav Karel Feierabend: October 14, 1938 - December 1, 1938
- Jaroslav Krejci: 1 December 1938 - 15 March 1939 ^{[p 1]}
- Jaroslav Stránský: April 5, 1945 - November 6, 1945 ^{[p 2]}
- Prokop Drtina: November 6, 1945 - February 25, 1948
- Alexej Čepička: 25 February 1948 - 25 April 1950
- Štefan Rais: April 25, 1950 - September 14, 1953
- Václav Škoda: September 14, 1953 - December 12, 1954
- Jan Bartuška: December 12, 1954 - June 16, 1956
- Václav Škoda: June 16, 1956 - July 11, 1960
- Alois Neuman: July 11, 1960 - April 8, 1968
- Bohuslav Kučera: April 8, 1968 - December 31, 1968

=== Czech Republic (1969-present) ===
Order	Minister	Subject	Start and end office		Government
1.	Václav Hrabal	ČSS	January 8, 1969	September 29, 1969	Rázl
2.	Jan Němec	KSČ	September 29, 1969	June 18, 1981	Rázl
2.	Jan Němec	KSČ	September 29, 1969	June 18, 1981	Kempný and Korčák
2.	Jan Němec	KSČ	September 29, 1969	June 18, 1981	Korčák II.
2.	Jan Němec	KSČ	September 29, 1969	June 18, 1981	Korčák III.
3.	Antonín Kašpar	KSČ	June 18, 1981	December 5, 1989	Korčák IV.
3.	Antonín Kašpar	KSČ	June 18, 1981	December 5, 1989	Korčák, Adamec, Pitra and Pithart
4.	Dagmar Burešová	OF	December 5, 1989	June 29, 1990	Korčák, Adamec, Pitra and Pithart
5.	Leon Richter	OF	June 29, 1990	January 8, 1992	Pithart
6.	Jiří Novák	ODS	January 24, 1992	31 December 1992	Pithart
6.	Jiří Novák	ODS	January 24, 1992	31 December 1992	Klaus I.

As part of the independent Republic

Order	Minister	Subject	Start and end office		Government
1.	Jiří Novák	ODS	1 January 1993	July 4, 1996	Klaus I.
2.	Jan Kalvoda	ODA	July 4, 1996	7 January 1997	Klaus II.
3.	Vlasta Parkanová [1st female]	ODA	7 January 1997	July 22, 1998	Klaus II.
3.	Vlasta Parkanová [1st female]	ODA	7 January 1997	July 22, 1998	Tošovský
4.	Otakar Motejl	nestr. for the CSSD	July 22, 1998	October 16, 2000	Zeman
5.	Pavel Rychetský	ČSSD	17 October 2000	February 2, 2001	Zeman
6.	Jaroslav Bureš	nestr. for the CSSD	February 2, 2001	July 15, 2002	Zeman
7.	Pavel Rychetský	ČSSD	July 15, 2002	August 5, 2003	Špidla
-	Vladimír Špidla (in charge of management)	ČSSD	August 6, 2003	August 16, 2003	Špidla
8.	Karel Čermák	nestr. for the CSSD	August 16, 2003	July 15, 2004	Špidla
-	Vladimír Špidla (in charge of management)	ČSSD	July 15, 2004	4 August 2004	Špidla
9.	Pavel Němec	US-DEU	4 August 2004	September 4, 2006	Gross
9.	Pavel Němec	US-DEU	4 August 2004	September 4, 2006	Paroubek
10.	Jiří Pospíšil	ODS	September 4, 2006	May 8, 2009	Topolánek I.
10.	Jiří Pospíšil	ODS	September 4, 2006	May 8, 2009	Topolánek II.
11.	Daniela Kovářová	non-member ^{[p. 1]}	May 8, 2009	July 13, 2010	Fischer
12.	Jiří Pospíšil	ODS	July 13, 2010	June 27, 2012	Nečas
13.	Pavel Blažek	ODS	July 3, 2012	July 10, 2013	Nečas
14.	Marie Benešová	non-member ^{[p. 2]}	July 10, 2013	January 29, 2014	Rusnok
15.	Helena Válková	ANO	January 29, 2014	March 1, 2015	Sobotka
16.	Robert Pelikán	ANO	March 12, 2015	June 27, 2018	Sobotka
16.	Robert Pelikán	ANO	March 12, 2015	June 27, 2018	Babiš I.
17.	Taťána Malá	ANO	June 27, 2018	July 10, 2018	Babiš II.
18.	Jan Kněžínek	non-member (ANO)	July 10, 2018	April 30, 2019	Babiš II.
19.	Marie Benešová	non-member (ANO)	April 30, 2019	December 17, 2021	Babiš II.
20.	Pavel Blažek	ODS	December 17, 2021	May 10, 2025	Fiala
21.	Eva Decroix	ODS	May 10, 2025	December 15, 2025	Fiala
22.	Jeroným Tejc	non-member (ANO)	December 15, 2025	serving	Babiš III.

== See also ==
- Justice ministry
- Seznam ministrů spravedlnosti České republiky(List of ministers of justice of the Czech Republic)
- Seznam ministrů spravedlnosti Československa (List of ministers of justice of Czechoslovakia)
- Politics of the Czech Republic
