= Lenka Bradáčová =

Czech lawyer and public prosecutor

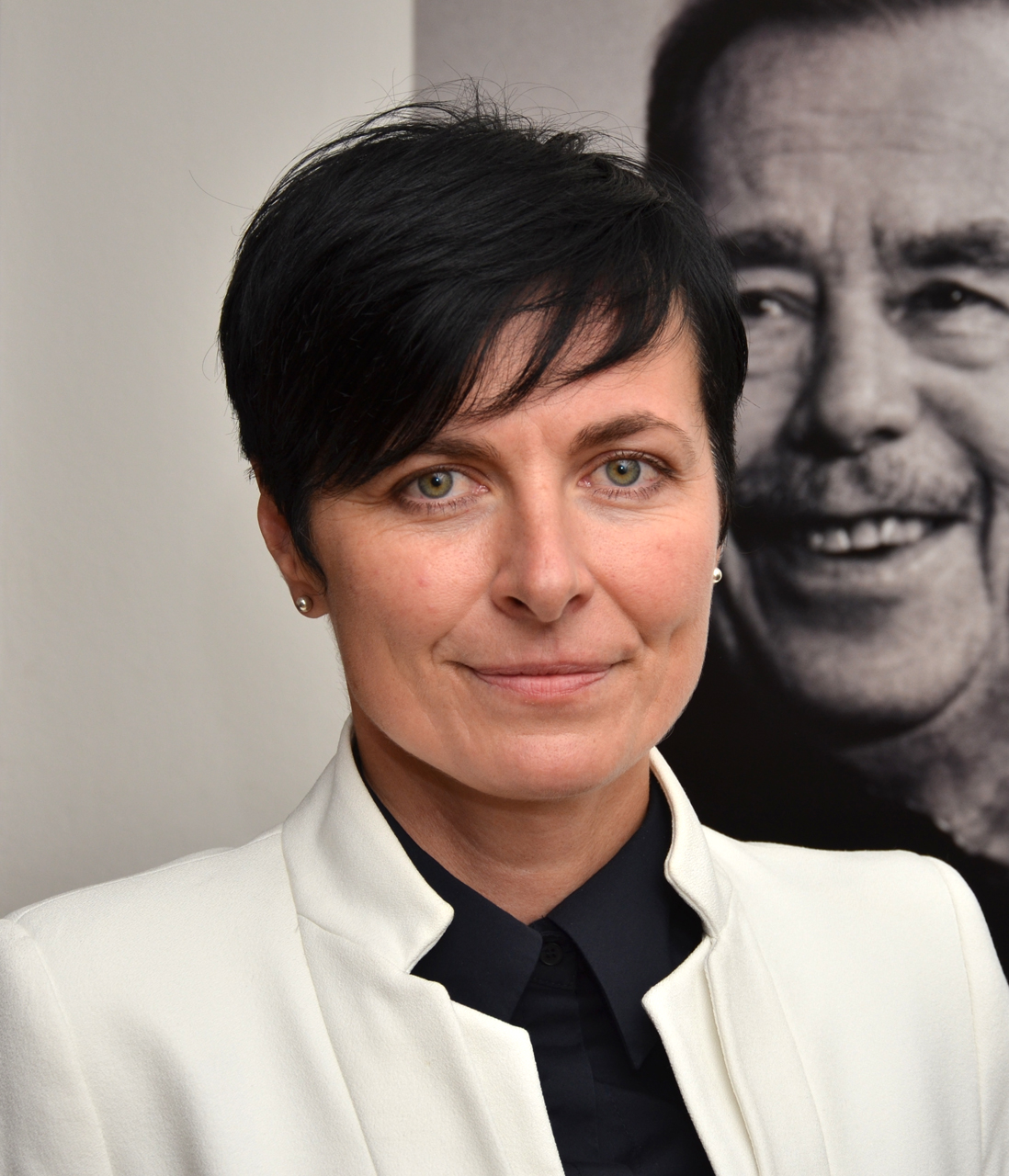

Prosecutor General of the Czech Republic
- Incumbent
- Assumed office 1 April 2025
- Preceded by: Igor Stříž

High State Attorney in Prague
- In office 30 August 2012 – 1 April 2025
- Preceded by: Vlastimil Rampula
- Succeeded by: Zdeněk Štěpánek

Personal details
- Born: 1 March 1973 (age 53) Roudnice nad Labem, Czechoslovakia (now Czech Republic)
- Education: Charles University

Lenka Bradáčová (born 1 March 1973) is a Czech lawyer and prosecutor who is serving as the Prosecutor General of the Czech Republic since April 2025. She previously was the High State Attorney in Prague from 2012 to 2025.

== Education and early career ==
Bradáčová attended grammar school in Roudnice nad Labem from 1988 to 1992. She then studied law at Charles University in Prague, graduating in 1998 with honors. She received the Karel Engliš Award from the university rector for being one of the best graduates in social sciences. In 2002, Bradáčová completed her doctoral studies at the Faculty of Law, Charles University, specializing in Public Law.

== Professional career ==
In 1998, she began legal training at the District Public Prosecutor's Office in Litoměřice. From March 2008 to April 2014, she served as president of the Union of Prosecutors of the Czech Republic. Bradáčová was the most influential woman of the Czech Republic in 2018 according to the Forbes magazine´s standings. On January 8, 2025, it was announced that Bradáčová will be the next Prosecutor General of the Czech Republic.

== Achievements and recognition ==
Bradáčová has been recognized for her influential role in the Czech legal system:

- She has been responsible for prosecuting some of the country's most serious and high-profile cases.
- Forbes magazine has repeatedly named her as one of the most influential women in the Czech Republic, ranking her first in 2018.
- She is known for her actions, courage, and hard work in dealing with complicated criminal cases involving businesses, politicians, and lobbyists.

== Additional roles ==
Bradáčová is also a lecturer at the Judicial Academy of the Czech Republic and the Police Academy of the Czech Republic as well as a member of the Committee for the Recodification of the Code of Criminal Procedure.
