= Taťána Malá =

Czech politician (born 1981)

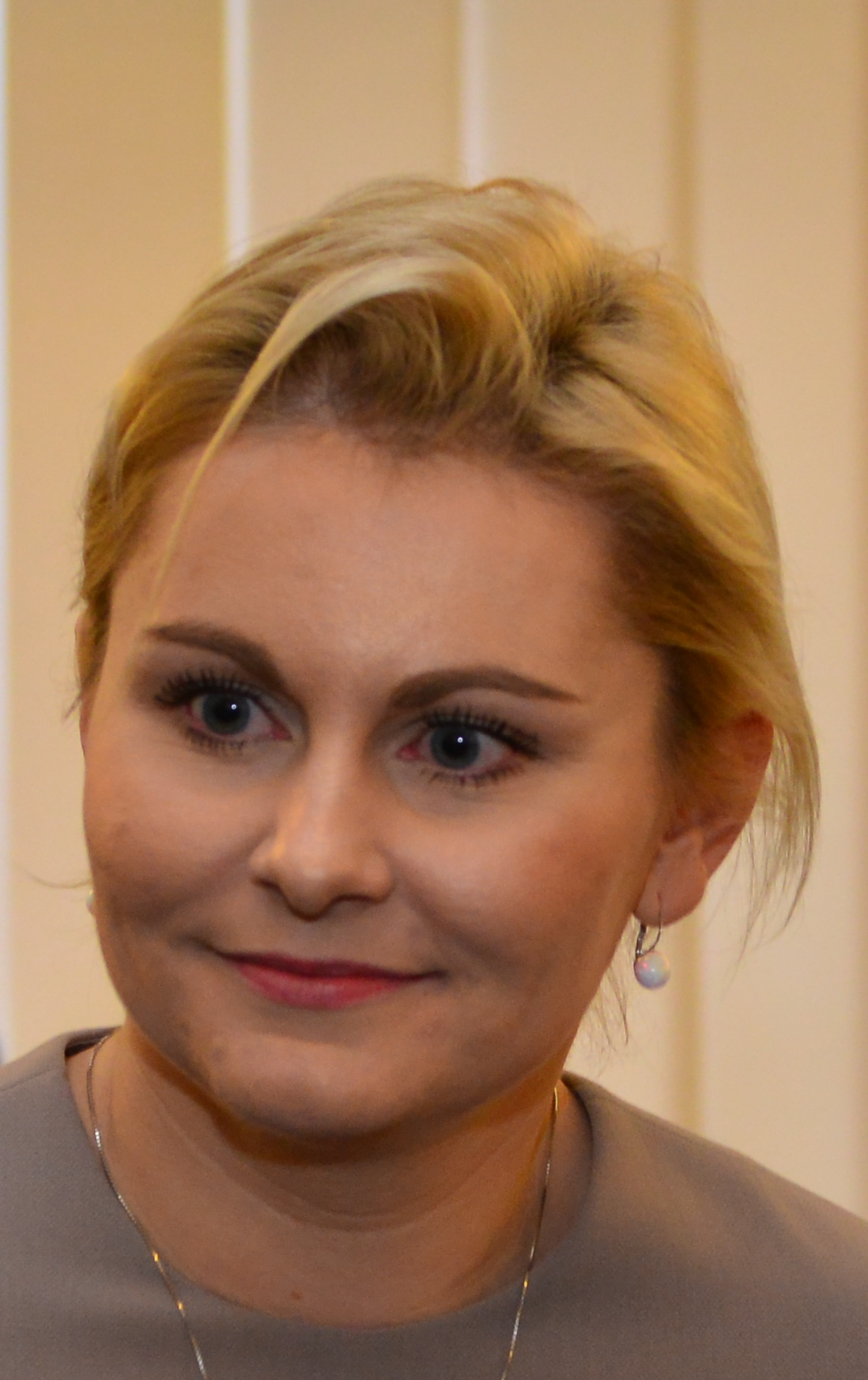
- Malá in 2016

Member of the Chamber of Deputies
- Incumbent
- Assumed office 21 October 2017
- Constituency: South Moravian Region

Personal details
- Born: 1 October 1981 (age 45) Moravská Třebová, Czechoslovakia
- Party: ANO (since 2013)
- Education: Mendel University in Brno

Taťána Malá (born 1 October 1981) is a Czech lawyer and politician serving as a member of the Chamber of Deputies for ANO since 2017. In 2018, she served as minister of justice.

She was born in Moravská Třebová. She studied economics at the Mendel University in Brno. She has three children.
