= Pavel Blažek =

Minister of Justice of the Czech Republic (2012–2013; 2021–2025)

Pavel Blažek MP
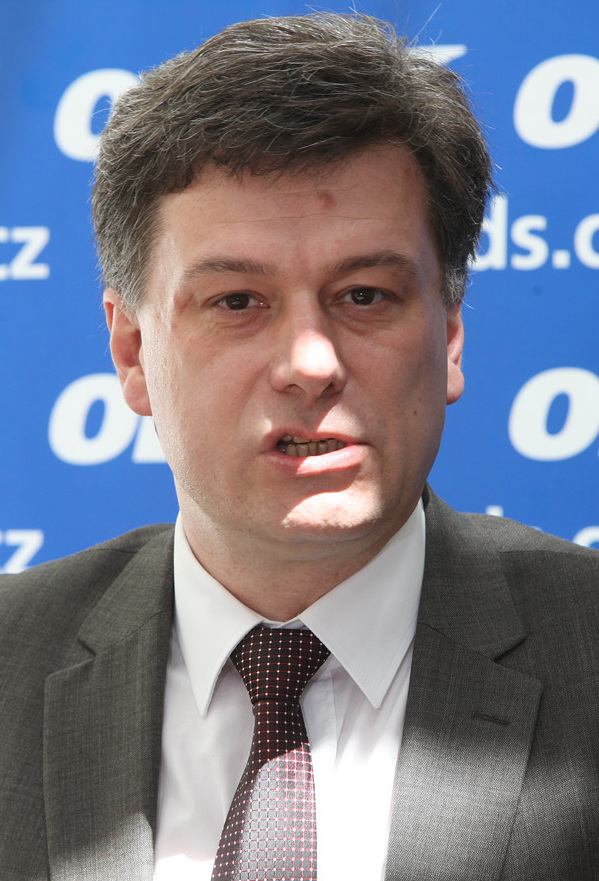
- Blažek in 2014

Minister of Justice
- In office 17 December 2021 – 10 June 2025
- Prime Minister: Petr Fiala
- Preceded by: Marie Benešová
- Succeeded by: Eva Decroix
- In office 3 July 2012 – 10 July 2013
- Prime Minister: Petr Nečas
- Preceded by: Jiří Pospíšil
- Succeeded by: Marie Benešová

Member of the Chamber of Deputies
- Incumbent
- Assumed office 26 October 2013

Personal details
- Born: 8 April 1969 (age 57) Brno, Czechoslovakia
- Party: Civic Democratic Party (1998 – present)
- Spouse: Alena Blažková
- Children: 2
- Education: Masaryk University

Pavel Blažek (born 8 April 1969) is a Czech politician who served as Minister of Justice of the Czech Republic from 2021 to 2025 in the Cabinet of Petr Fiala, and previously from July 2012 to July 2013 in the Cabinet of Petr Nečas. He has been a Member of the Chamber of Deputies (MP) since 26 October 2013.

On 30 May 2025, Blažek resigned as Minister of Justice amid criticism over the ministry receiving a bitcoin donation from a person convicted of distributing drugs, which it later sold for 1 billion koruna ($45 million).

Blažek is sometimes referred to as "Don Pablo" by critics, in reference to his alleged role in backroom deals and corruption scandals.
