= 2025 TOP 09 leadership election =

- 8 November 2025
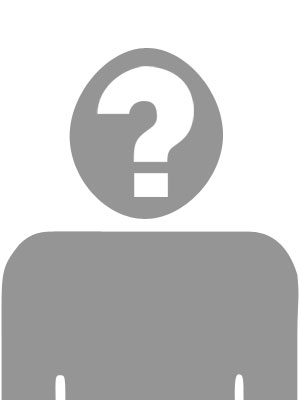
Candidate	Matěj Ondřej Havel
Party	TOP 09
Electoral vote	120
Percentage	70.6
Leader of TOP 09 before election
Markéta Pekarová Adamová
Elected Leader of TOP 09
Matěj Ondřej Havel

The Czech political party TOP 09 held a leadership election on 8 November 2025. The incumbent leader Markéta Pekarová Adamová is not seeking reelection.

== Background ==
Markéta Pekarová Adamová became leader of the party in 2019. Under her leadership TOP 09 participated in the 2021 Czech parliamentary election as part of the Spolu alliance and received 14 seats in the Chamber of Deputies. She became the Speaker of the Chamber afterwards.

On 18 February 2025 she announced the she would not be running in the upcoming parliamentary election and won't be seeking re-election as the leader of the party.

TOP 09 participated in 2025 parliamentary election as part of Spolu alliance and won 9 seats in Chamber of Deputies. Leadership election was scheduled for 8 November 2025, one monthe after parliamentary election. Former leader of the party Jiří Pospíšil received nomination from Prague organisation. Deputy leader of the party Matěj Ondřej Havel also admitted interest in running while Vlastimil Válek stated on 7 October 2025 that he is yet to decide whether he runs or not.

On 13 October 2025, Matěj Ondřej Havel received nomination from Brno regional organisation. He announced his candidacy afterwards. According to CNN Prima News, his candidacy was to be supported by Vlastimil Válek who decided to not run. Válek himself at the time stated that it’s too soon to announce his decision whether he runs or not. On 23 October 2025, Válek announced he will run for another term for the deputy leader of TOP 09. On 4 November 2025, Jiří Pospíšil and Marek Ženíšek decided to not run.

== Candidates ==
- Matěj Ondřej Havel, MP and Deputy leader of the party.

=== Did not Run ===
- Jan Jakob

=== Declined ===
- Markéta Pekarová Adamová, the incumbent leader decided to not seek reelection.
- Vlastimil Válek, Minister of Health in the Cabinet of Petr Fiala, MP and Deputy leader of the party. (will run as Deputy leader of the party)
- Jiří Pospíšil, MP and former leader of the party. (will run as Deputy leader of the party)
- Marek Ženíšek, Minister for Science and Research in the Cabinet of Petr Fiala.

== Voting ==
Voting took place on 8 November 2025. Havel was the only candidate and received 120 of 171 votes and thus was elected.

Candidate	Vote	%
Matěj Ondřej Havel	120	70.18%
Against	51	29.82%
