= Next Czech parliamentary election =

- By October 2029

All 200 seats in the Chamber of Deputies 101 seats needed for a majority
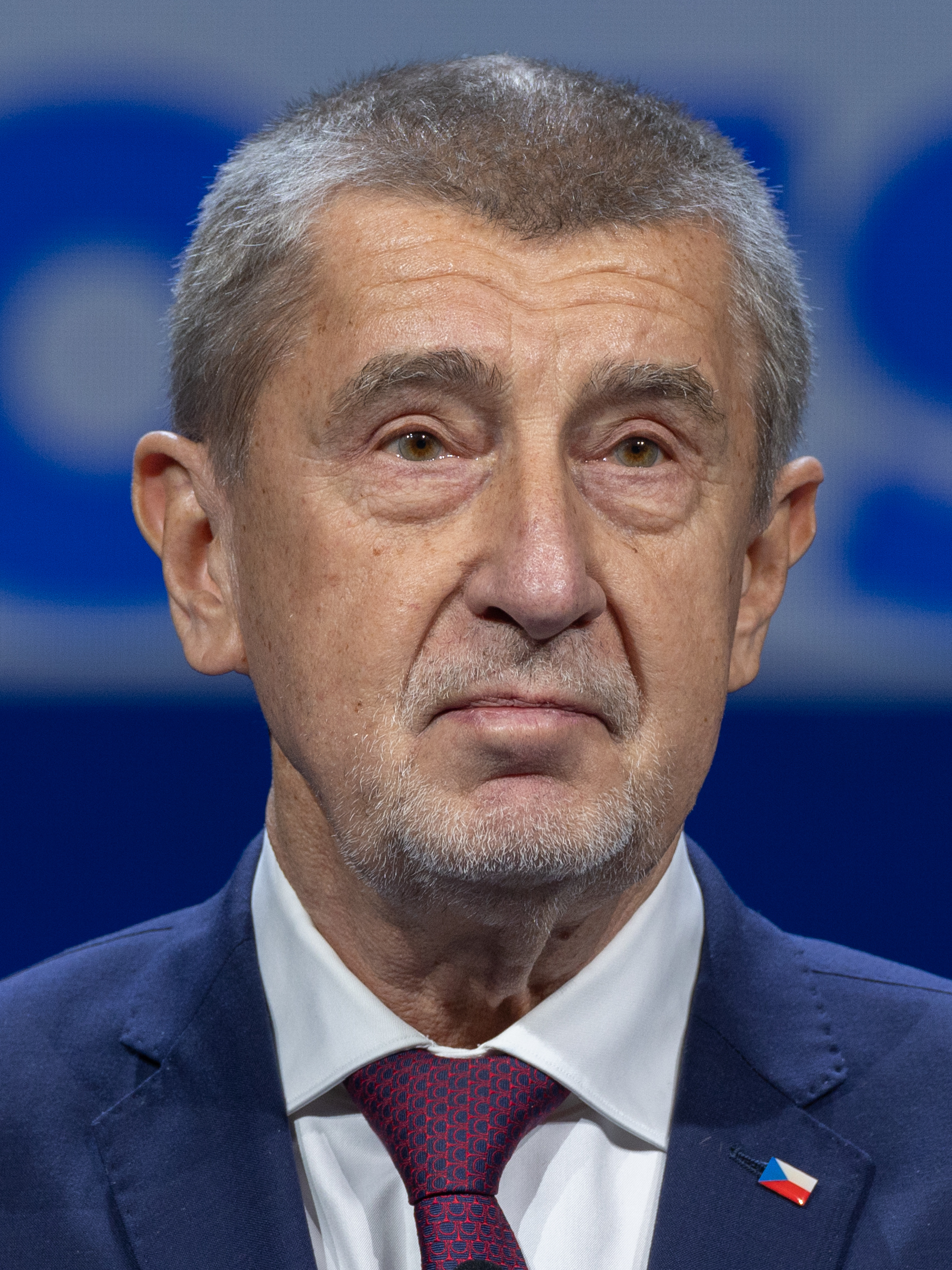

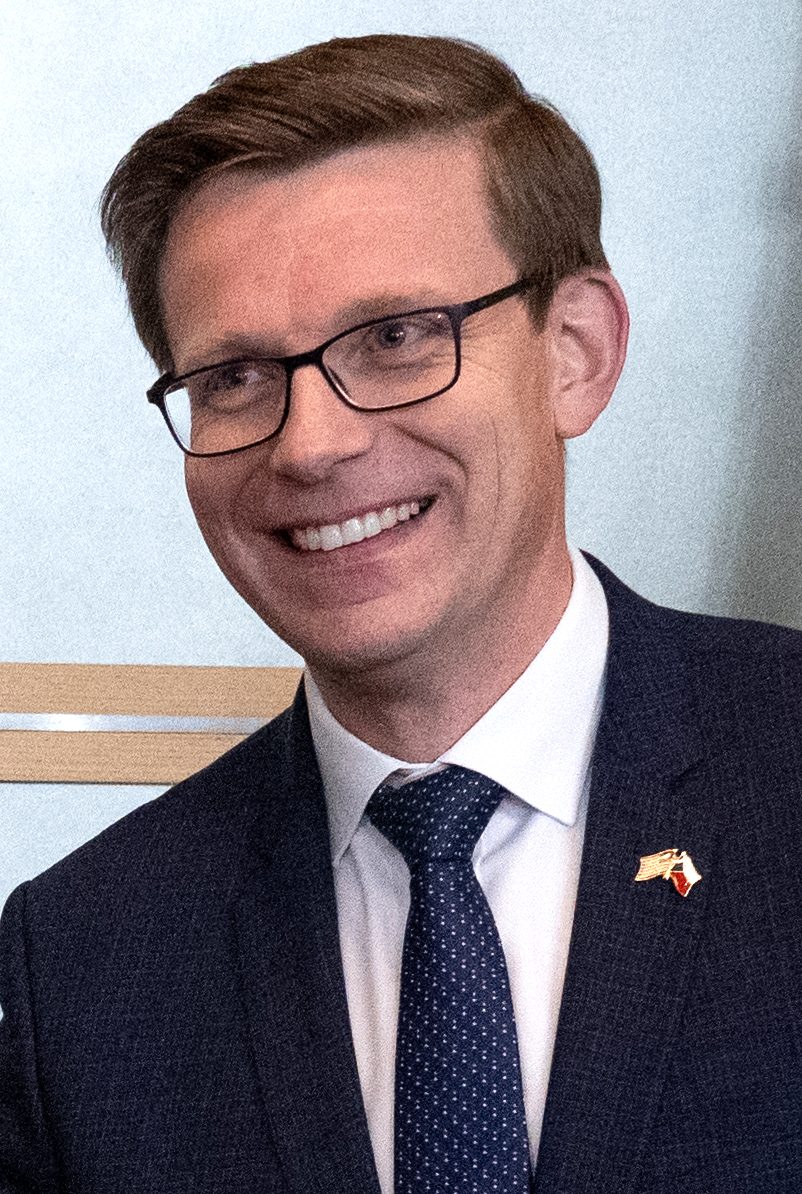

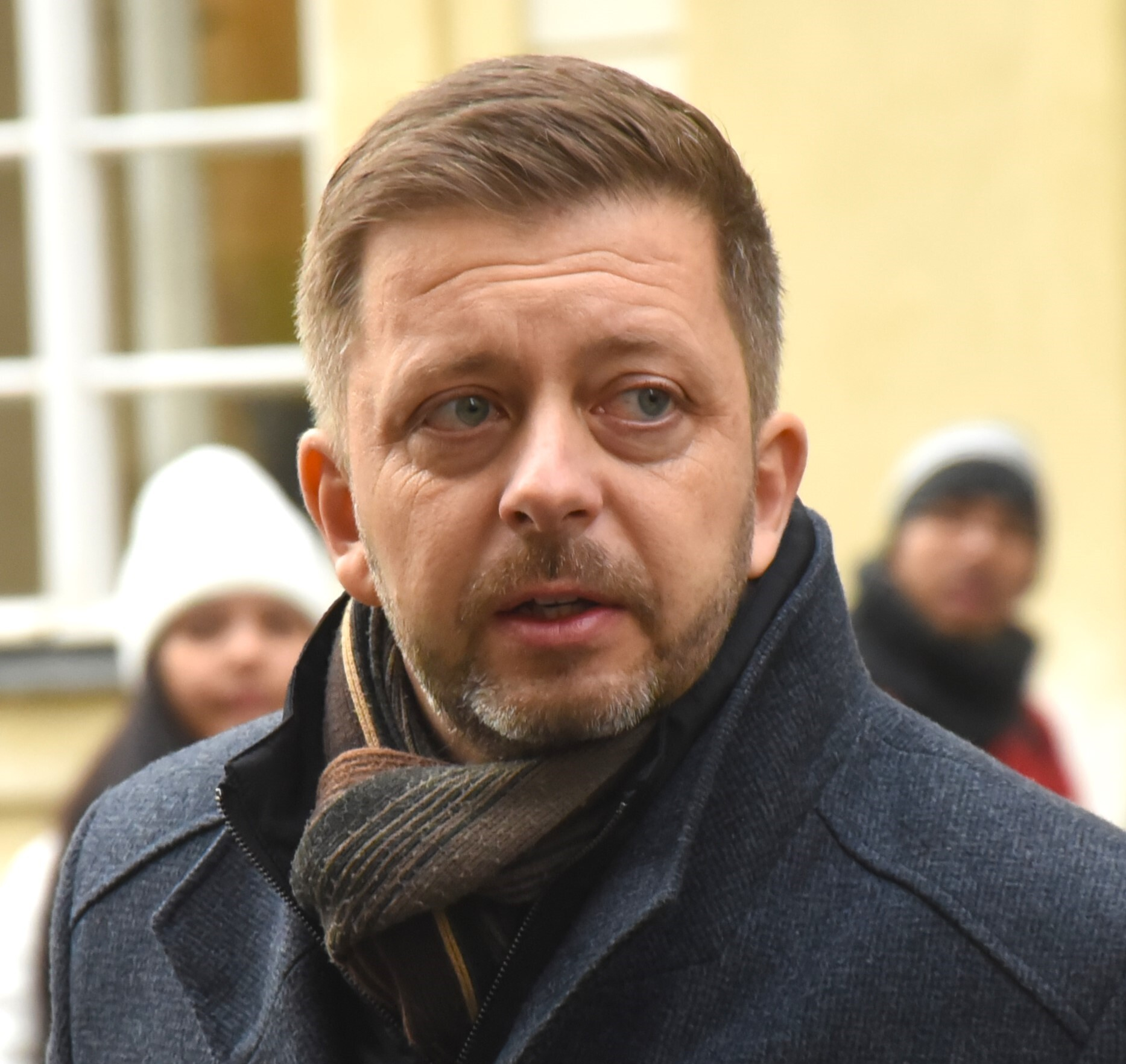

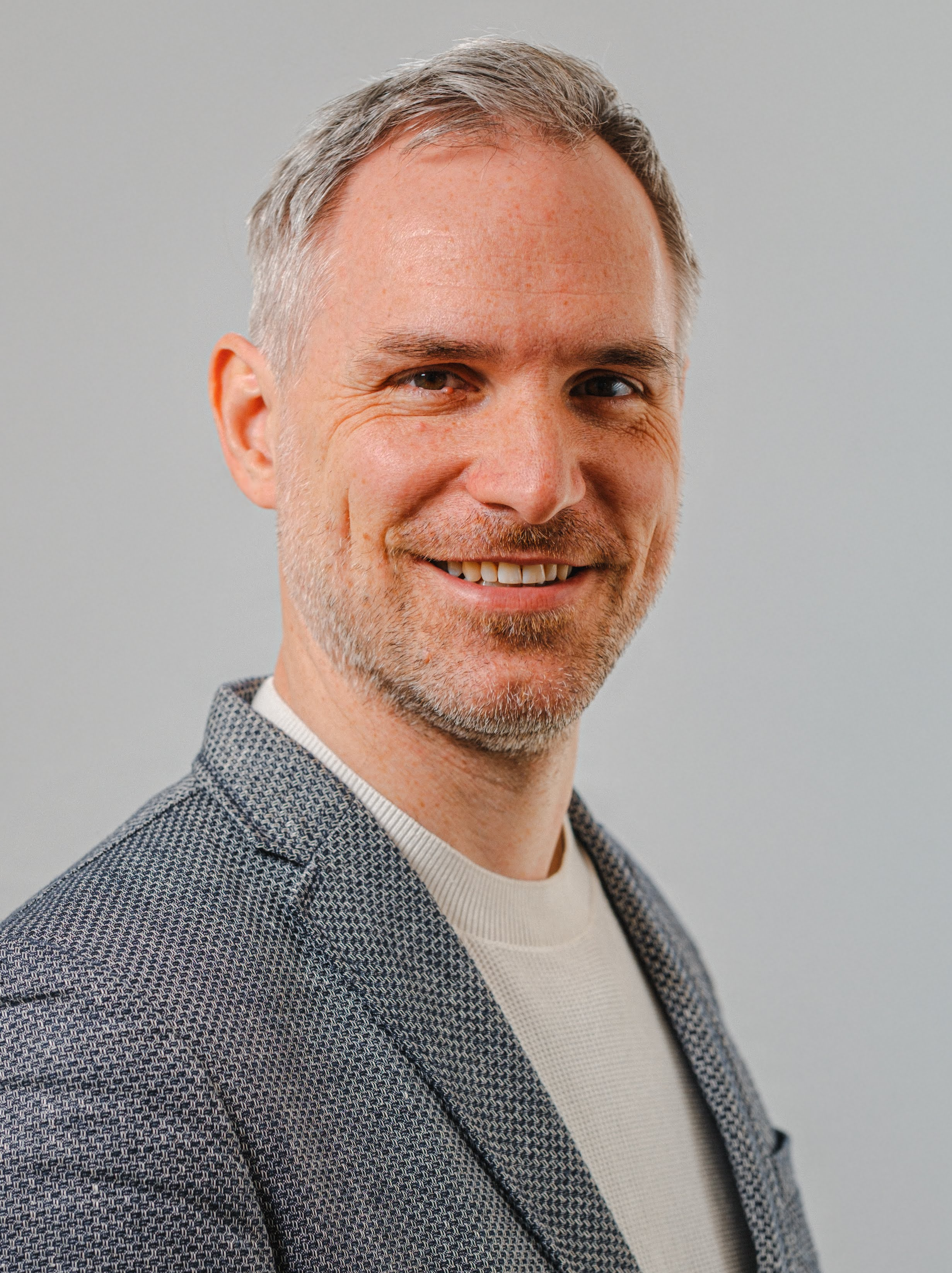

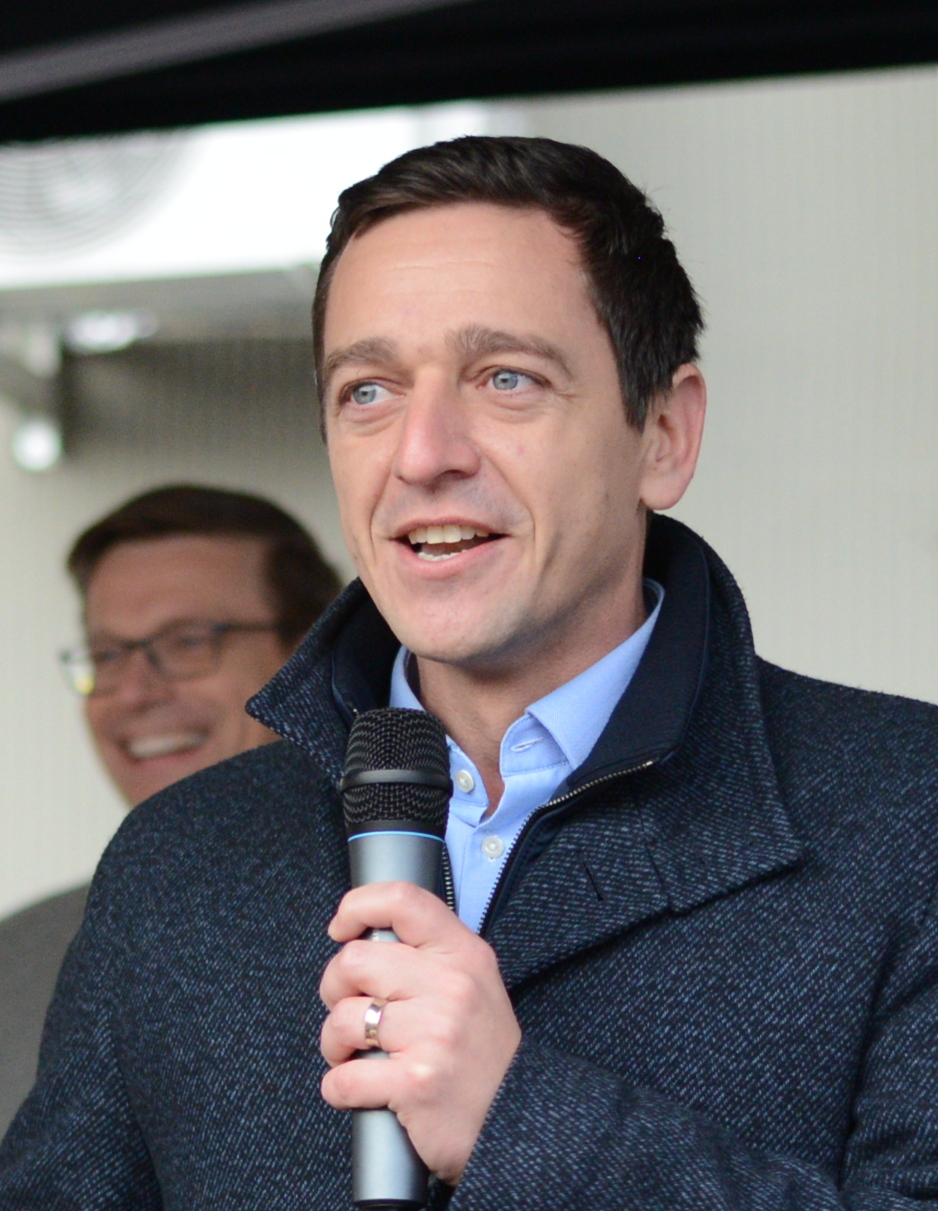

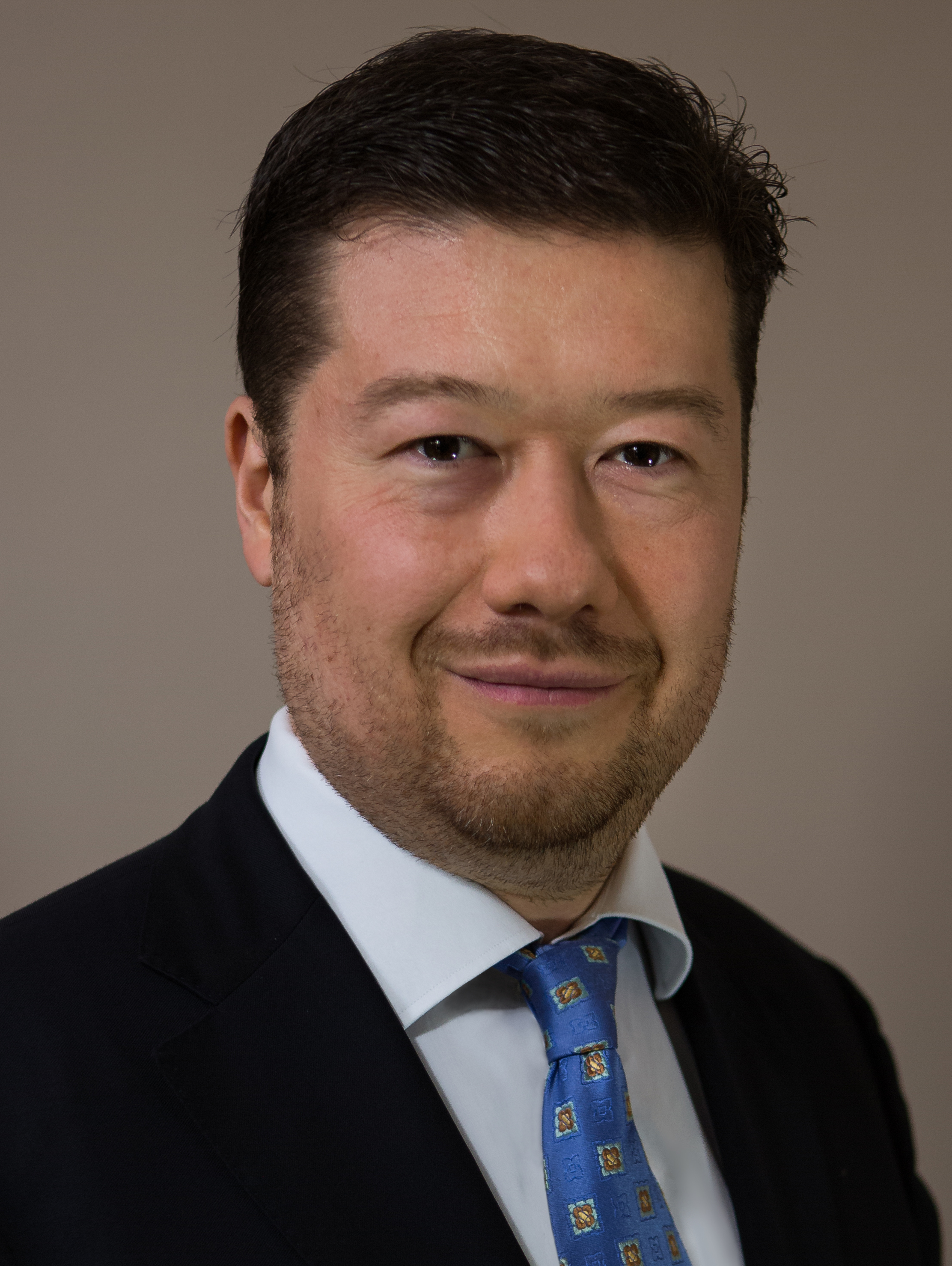

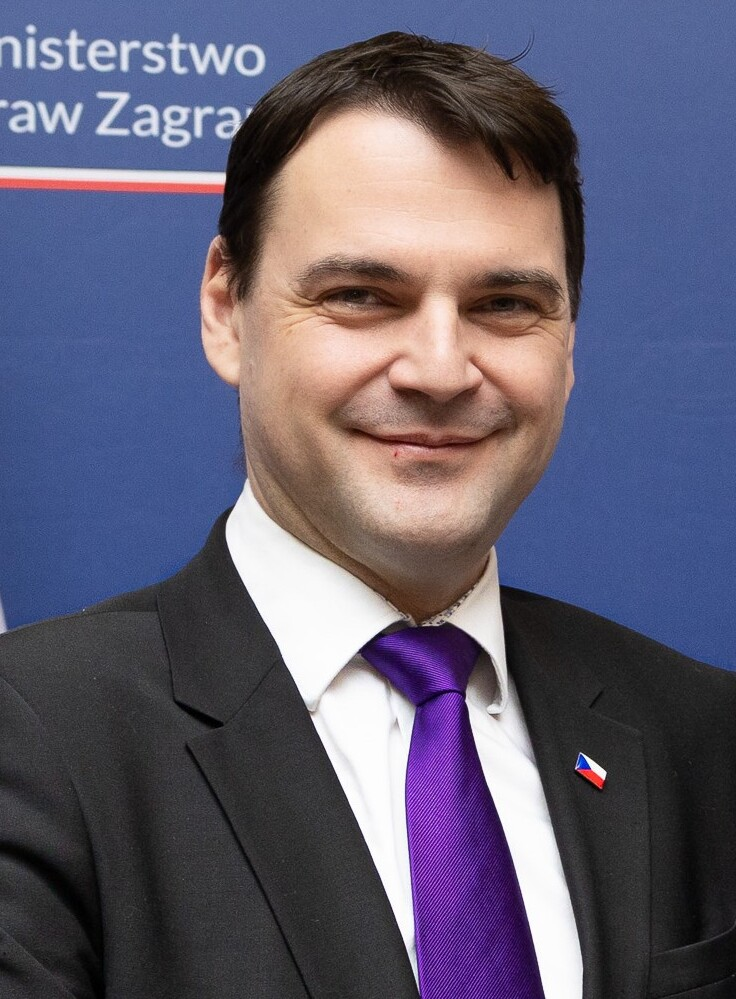
| | First party | Second party | Third party |
|---|---|---|---|
| Leader | Andrej Babiš | Martin Kupka | Vít Rakušan |
| Party | ANO | ODS | STAN |
| Leader's seat | Moravian-Silesian | Central Bohemian | Central Bohemian |
| Last election | 34.5% 80 seats | 23.4%, 27 seats (Note: As part of Spolu, which won 23.4% of the vote and 52 seats in total.) | 11.2%, 22 seats |
| | Fourth party | Fifth party | Sixth party |
| Leader | Zdeněk Hřib | Jan Grolich | Tomio Okamura |
| Party | Pirates | KDU-ČSL | SPD |
| Leader's seat | Prague | South Moravian | Central Bohemian |
| Last election | 9.0%, 18 seats | 23.4%, 16 seats | 7.8%, 15 seats |
| | Seventh party | Eighth party |
| Leader | Petr Macinka | Matěj Ondřej Havel |
| Party | AUTO | TOP 09 |
| Leader's seat | South Moravian | Hradec Králové |
| Last election | 6.8%, 13 seats | 23.4%, 9 seats |
Prime Minister before election
Andrej Babiš
ANO
Prime Minister after election
TBD

The next Czech parliamentary election will be held in or before October 2029 to elect all 200 members of the Chamber of Deputies, the lower house of the Czech Parliament.

== Background ==
=== 2025 election ===
Composition of the Chamber of Deputies (by group)
| Party | Seats | +/– (vs 2021) |
|---|---|---|
| ANO 2011 | 80 | +8 |
| Civic Democratic Party | 27 | -7 |
| Mayors and Independents | 22 | -11 |
| Czech Pirate Party | 18 | +14 |
| KDU-ČSL | 16 | -7 |
| Freedom and Direct Democracy | 15 | -5 |
| Motorists for Themselves | 13 | +13 |
| TOP 09 | 9 | -5 |

The 2025 election saw ANO become the largest party and return to power. Its leader Andrej Babiš subsequently formed a majority coalition government with SPD and the Motorists. The previous government parties entered opposition.

== Electoral system ==
The Constitution of the Czech Republic stipulates that an election to the Chamber of Deputies, the lower house of the Parliament, must be held every four years. The executive government is answerable to the Chamber of Deputies and remains in power only as long as it commands the confidence of the majority of its members. Article 19(1) of the Constitution states that any citizen of the Czech Republic over the age of 21 years old is eligible to serve as a Member of Parliament.

All 200 deputies are proportionally elected on open lists in 14 electoral regions, which follow the borders of the 13 Czech regions and the capital city of Prague. Seats are distributed to the regions based on the number of valid votes in each region. Mandates are assigned using the largest remainder method, using the Imperiali quota in the first round and the Hagenbach-Bischoff quota in the second round. In the first round, mandates are divided between each region. Seats not assigned in the first round are then transferred to a national second round, where the sum of parties' remaining votes from all regions are used. To be eligible for seats, a single party must earn at least 5% of the national vote, a coalition of two parties needs 8%, and a coalition of three or more parties requires 11%, unless only one group makes it into the Chamber.

== Opinion polls ==
=== Party polls ===
The table below shows opinion polls conducted since the 2025 election, in reverse chronological order. Polling figures which are in bold indicate the relevant party or coalition is above the threshold to gain representation: 5% for single-party lists, 8% for two-party coalitions, 11% for coalitions of three or more parties.

The leading party in each poll has its cell shaded in the party's colour. The total level of support for the government and opposition parties is also shown.

Projected seat totals, as listed on the Programy do voleb website, are shown below the corresponding vote shares. Unless otherwise indicated, polling results refer to individual parties, not coalitions.

| Polling firm | Fieldwork date | Sample size | ANO | ODS | KDU–ČSL | TOP 09 | STAN | Piráti | Z | SPD | Svobodní | PRO | Tricolour | Motorists for Themselves | Stačilo! | KSČM | SOCDEM | Přísaha | Our Czechia | Others | Gov. | Opp. |
|---|---|---|---|---|---|---|---|---|---|---|---|---|---|---|---|---|---|---|---|---|---|---|
| NMS | 30 Oct–3 Nov 2026 | 1,017 | **29.9**; 84 | **10.5**; 26 | 4.2; 0 | 2.8; 0 | **17.8**; 47 | **6.6**; 15 | 1.7; 0 | **7.0**; 16 | 1.3; 0 | 1.3; 0 | 0.1; 0 | **5.9**; 12 | – | 2.2; 0 | 0.7; 0 | 1.1; 0 | 4.7; 0 | 2.2; 0 | **45.5**; **112** | 43.6; 88 |
| Median | 1–31 Oct 2026 | 1,021 | **32.0**; 90 | **10.5**; 26 | 4.0; 0 | 2.5; 0 | **18.5**; 48 | **7.5**; 18 | – | **8.5**; 18 | – | 2.0; 0 | – | 3.0; 0 | – | 2.5; 0 | – | – | 3.0; 0 | 6.0; 0 | **45.5**; **108** | 43.0; 92 |
| Kantar | 12–30 Oct 2026 | 1,200 | **29.5**; 81 | **12.5**; 30 | 4.0; 0 | 2.5; 0 | **23.5**; 61 | **7.5**; 17 | – | **5.5**; 11 | – | – | – | 4.5; 0 | – | – | – | – | 3.0; 0 | 7.5; 0 | 39.5; 92 | **50.0**; **108** |
| STEM | 1–6 Oct 2026 | 1,332 | **31.3**; 91 | **11.3**; 29 | 2.5; 0 | 3.7; 0 | **16.6**; 46 | **7.2**; 17 | 2.1; 0 | **7.5**; 17 | 1.3; 0 | 1.8; 0 | – | 4.6; 0 | 1.5; 0 | 1.8; 0 | 1.3; 0 | – | 1.9; 0 | 3.7; 0 | **46.5**; **108** | 43.4; 92 |
| NMS | 1–5 Oct 2026 | 1,034 | **28.8**; 78 | **12.5**; 30 | 3.3; 0 | 2.9; 0 | **18.8**; 48 | **6.3**; 14 | 0.9; 0 | **8.0**; 18 | 1.3; 0 | 1.2; 0 | 0.4; 0 | **5.7**; 14 | – | 3.0; 0 | 1.3; 0 | 1.4; 0 | 2.3; 0 | 1.9; 0 | **45.4**; **108** | 44.7; 92 |
| Median | 1–30 Sep 2026 | 1,018 | **29.5**; 79 | **12.5**; 31 | 3.0; 0 | 3.5; 0 | **17.0**; 44 | **7.5**; 18 | – | **9.0**; 24 | – | 2.0; 0 | – | **5.0**; 8 | – | 2.0; 0 | – | – | 2.0; 0 | 7.0; 0 | **45.5**; **107** | 43.5; 93 |
| Ipsos | 8–12 Sep 2026 | 1,084 | **31.4**; 87 | **14.0**; 37 | 3.5; 0 | 2.9; 0 | **16.6**; 43 | **7.9**; 18 | 1.1; 0 | **7.1**; 15 | 1.2; 0 | 1.1; 0 | – | 4.5; 0 | 1.8; 0 | 1.6; 0 | – | – | 2.5; 0 | 2.8; 0 | 45.3; **102** | **46.0**; 98 |
| STEM | 2–7 Sep 2026 | 1,539 | **31.1**; 91 | **12.8**; 34 | 2.6; 0 | 3.3; 0 | **14.8**; 40 | **7.3**; 18 | 1.4; 0 | **7.6**; 17 | 1.1; 0 | 1.1; 0 | – | 4.9; 0 | 1.5; 0 | 2.1; 0 | – | 1.2; 0 | 2.4; 0 | 4.6; 0 | **45.8**; **108** | 42.2; 92 |
| NMS | 28 Aug–2 Sep 2026 | 1,044 | **31.0**; 86 | **12.2**; 29 | 3.2; 0 | 2.8; 0 | **18.1**; 47 | **8.9**; 21 | 1.2; 0 | **7.4**; 17 | 1.2; 0 | 1.5; 0 | 0.3; 0 | 4.4; 0 | – | 1.6; 0 | 0.9; 0 | 0.9; 0 | 2.8; 0 | 1.6; 0 | **45.8**; **103** | 45.2; 97 |
| Median | 1–31 Aug 2026 | 1,021 | **34.0**; 99 | **11.0**; 27 | 3.5; 0 | 4.0; 0 | **12.0**; 31 | **7.5**; 19 | – | **9.0**; 24 | – | – | – | 4.5; 0 | – | 4.5; 0 | – | – | 2.5; 0 | 7.5; 0 | **47.5**; **123** | 38.0; 77 |
| Kantar | 3–21 Aug 2026 | 991 | **30.5**; 80 | **15.5**; 39 | 3.5; 0 | 2.0; 0 | **17.0**; 41 | **8.5**; 19 | – | **6.5**; 14 | – | – | – | **5.0**; 7 | – | – | – | – | 2.5; 0 | 9.0; 0 | 42.0; **101** | **46.5**; 99 |
| Median | 1–31 Jul 2026 | 1,022 | **34.0**; 95 | **12.0**; 29 | 3.5; 0 | 3.0; 0 | **15.0**; 40 | **8.0**; 19 | – | **7.5**; 17 | – | – | – | 4.5; 0 | – | 3.5; 0 | – | – | 3.5; 0 | 5.5; 0 | **46.0**; **112** | 41.5; 88 |
| Median | 1–30 Jun 2026 | 1,022 | **34.0**; 94 | **13.0**; 33 | 3.5; 0 | 3.0; 0 | **12.5**; 32 | **7.0**; 17 | – | **6.5**; 16 | – | – | – | **5.0**; 8 | – | 4.0; 0 | – | 2.0; 0 | 4.0; 0 | 5.5; 0 | **45.5**; **118** | 39.0; 82 |
| STEM | 16–21 Jun 2026 | 1,352 | **32.2**; 89 | **13.0**; 32 | 2.4; 0 | 3.4; 0 | **13.5**; 33 | **7.6**; 18 | 1.8; 0 | **7.9**; 18 | – | – | – | **5.3**; 10 | 1.1; 0 | 1.4; 0 | – | 1.2; 0 | 3.2; 0 | 6.0; 0 | **43.2**; **117** | 41.7; 83 |
| NMS | 3–8 June 2026 | 1,035 | **31.6**; 85 | **13.9**; 35 | 2.4; 0 | 3.0; 0 | **14.8**; 35 | **7.4**; 17 | 1.3; 0 | **7.5**; 17 | 0.7; 0 | 1.1; 0 | 0.3; 0 | **5.8**; 11 | – | 2.4; 0 | 0.8; 0 | 1.0; 0 | 3.9; 0 | 2.1; 0 | **47.0**; **113** | 42.8; 87 |
| Kantar | 18 May–5 June 2026 | 1,003 | **31.5**; 82 | **15.5**; 39 | 4.0; 0 | 2.5; 0 | **15.5**; 37 | **9.5**; 22 | – | **6.5**; 13 | – | – | – | **5.0**; 7 | – | – | – | – | 2.5; 0 | 7.5; 0 | 43.0; **102** | **47.0**; 98 |
| Median | 1–31 May 2026 | 1,020 | **35.5**; 98 | **12.0**; 28 | 2.5; 0 | 3.0; 0 | **14.5**; 38 | **8.5**; 21 | – | **6.5**; 15 | – | – | – | 3.5; 0 | – | 3.0; 0 | 2.0; 0 | – | 4.5; 0 | 4.5; 0 | **45.5**; **113** | 40.5; 87 |
| Ipsos | 11–14 May 2026 | 1,533 | **31.5**; 89 | **14.9**; 39 | 3.4; 0 | 3.5; 0 | **14.5**; 39 | **8.3**; 20 | 1.1; 0 | **6.2**; 13 | 1.4; 0 | 1.0; 0 | – | 4.4; 0 | 1.9; 0 | – | – | 1.1; 0 | 3.0; 0 | 3.8; 0 | 44.5; **102** | **45.7**; 98 |
| NMS | 30 Apr–5 May 2026 | 1,022 | **32.5**; 90 | **14.8**; 39 | 2.7; 0 | 2.5; 0 | **14.5**; 37 | **6.7**; 15 | 1.6; 0 | **8.7**; 19 | – | – | – | 4.8; 0 | – | 2.3; 0 | 1.1; 0 | 1.3; 0 | 2.8; 0 | 3.7; 0 | **46.0**; **109** | 42.9; 91 |
| Kantar | 13–30 Apr 2026 | 995 | **32.0**; 82 | **15.5**; 39 | 3.5; 0 | 2.0; 0 | **16.0**; 37 | **9.5**; 22 | – | **6.5**; 13 | – | – | – | **5.0**; 7 | – | – | – | – | 3.0; 0 | 7.0; 0 | 43.5; **102** | **46.5**; 98 |
| NMS | 1–7 Apr 2026 | 1,031 | **32.7**; 93 | **13.9**; 37 | 2.5; 0 | 3.1; 0 | **13.7**; 35 | **8.0**; 19 | 1.4; 0 | **7.4**; 16 | – | – | – | 4.4; 0 | – | 2.8; 0 | 1.0; 0 | 1.4; 0 | 4.1; 0 | 3.7; 0 | **44.5**; **109** | 41.2; 91 |
| Kantar | 23 Mar–2 Apr 2026 | 1,017 | **34.0**; 87 | **15.0**; 37 | 3.0; 0 | 2.5; 0 | **15.5**; 38 | **9.5**; 19 | – | **6.5**; 11 | – | – | – | **5.0**; 8 | – | – | – | – | 3.0; 0 | 6.0; 0 | **45.5**; **106** | **45.5**; 94 |
| STEM | 11–16 Mar 2026 | 1,223 | **34.2**; 98 | **12.2**; 31 | 2.4; 0 | 3.1; 0 | **13.3**; 34 | **8.1**; 20 | 2.5; 0 | **7.1**; 17 | – | 1.0; 0 | – | 4.8; 0 | 1.2; 0 | 1.3; 0 | – | 1.1; 0 | 3.7; 0 | 4.0; 0 | **46.1**; **115** | 41.6; 85 |
| NMS | 5–10 Mar 2026 | 1,048 | **31.5**; 82 | **14.1**; 35 | 3.0; 0 | 2.6; 0 | **13.6**; 32 | **8.3**; 19 | 1.4; 0 | **7.8**; 17 | – | – | – | **7.1**; 15 | – | 2.5; 0 | 1.0; 0 | 1.1; 0 | 2.6; 0 | 3.6; 0 | **46.4**; **114** | 43.0; 86 |
| Kantar | 9–27 Feb 2026 | 1,031 | **34.5**; 88 | **14.5**; 35 | 3.0; 0 | 2.0; 0 | **15.5**; 36 | **9.0**; 21 | – | **6.5**; 13 | – | – | – | **5.0**; 7 | – | – | – | – | 3.5; 0 | 6.5; 0 | **46.0**; **108** | 44.0; 92 |
| NMS | 13–17 Feb 2026 | 1,001 | **32.6**; 92 | **14.7**; 39 | 2.6; 0 | 2.4; 0 | **14.6**; 39 | **7.2**; 16 | – | **6.5**; 14 | 1.4; 0 | 1.6; 0 | – | 4.7; 0 | – | 1.7; 0 | – | 1.4; 0 | 4.7; 0 | 3.9; 0 | **46.8**; **106** | 41.5; 94 |
| Kantar | 12–30 Jan 2026 | 1,023 | **34.5**; 87 | **16.0**; 39 | 3.0; 0 | 4.5; 0 | **14.0**; 32 | **9.5**; 22 | – | **6.5**; 13 | – | – | – | **5.0**; 7 | – | – | – | – | – | 7.0; 0 | 46.0; **107** | **47.0**; 93 |
| STEM | 2–7 Jan 2026 | 1,089 | **34.6**; 95 | **14.1**; 37 | 3.4; 0 | 4.3; 0 | **12.6**; 31 | **8.4**; 21 | 1.6; 0 | **6.8**; 16 | – | 1.1; 0 | – | 4.9; 0 | 1.7; 0 | 1.3; 0 | – | 1.3; 0 | – | 4.0; 0 | **47.4**; **111** | 44.4; 89 |
| 2025 parliamentary election | 3–4 Oct 2025 | N/A | 34.5 80 | 23.4 52 | | | 11.2 22 | 9.0 18 | | 7.8 15 | | | | 6.8 13 | 4.3 0 | | | 1.1 0 | N/A | 1.9 0 | **49.1**; **108** | 43.6; 92 |

=== Coalition polls ===
In the first half of 2026, Kantar also conducted scenario polls with Spolu included as a unified coalition, as in the 2025 election. The coalition has been dormant since the election, and Kantar has argued that the scenario is unlikely, based on statements made by the individual parties.

| Polling firm | Fieldwork date | Sample size | ANO | SPOLU | | | STAN | Piráti | SPD | Motorists for Themselves | Our Czechia | Others | Gov. | Opp. |
| Polling firm | Fieldwork date | Sample size | ANO | ODS | KDU–ČSL | TOP 09 | STAN | Piráti | SPD | Motorists for Themselves | Our Czechia | Others | Gov. | Opp. |
|---|---|---|---|---|---|---|---|---|---|---|---|---|---|---|
| Kantar | 18 May–5 June 2026 | 1,003 | **31.5**; 77 | **21.0**; 49 | | | **15.5**; 34 | **9.5**; 21 | **6.5**; 12 | **5.0**; 7 | 3.0; 0 | 8.0; 0 | 43.0; 96 | **46.0**; **104** |
| Kantar | 13–30 Apr 2026 | 990 | **32.0**; 78 | **20.0**; 47 | | | **16.0**; 35 | **9.5**; 21 | **6.5**; 12 | **5.0**; 7 | 3.0; 0 | 8.0; 0 | 43.5; 97 | **45.5**; **103** |
| Kantar | 23 Mar–2 Apr 2026 | 1,017 | **34.0**; 81 | **20.5**; 48 | | | **15.5**; 33 | **9.5**; 21 | **6.5**; 11 | **5.0**; 6 | 3.0; 0 | 6.0; 0 | **45.5**; 98 | **45.5**; **102** |
| Kantar | 9–27 Feb 2026 | 1,026 | **34.5**; 83 | **19.5**; 44 | | | **15.5**; 34 | **9.0**; 19 | **6.5**; 12 | **5.0**; 8 | 3.5; 0 | 6.5; 0 | **46.0**; **103** | 44.0; 97 |
| Kantar | 12–30 Jan 2026 | 1,027 | **34.5**; 81 | **23.0**; 52 | | | **14.0**; 30 | **9.5**; 19 | **6.5**; 11 | **5.0**; 7 | – | 7.5; 0 | 46.0; 99 | **46.5**; **101** |
| 2025 parliamentary election | 3–4 Oct 2025 | N/A | 34.5 80 | 23.4 52 | | | 11.2 22 | 9.0 18 | 7.8 15 | 6.8 13 | N/A | 7.4 0 | **49.1**; **108** | 43.6; 92 |
