= 2021 TOP 09 leadership election =

- 20 November 2021
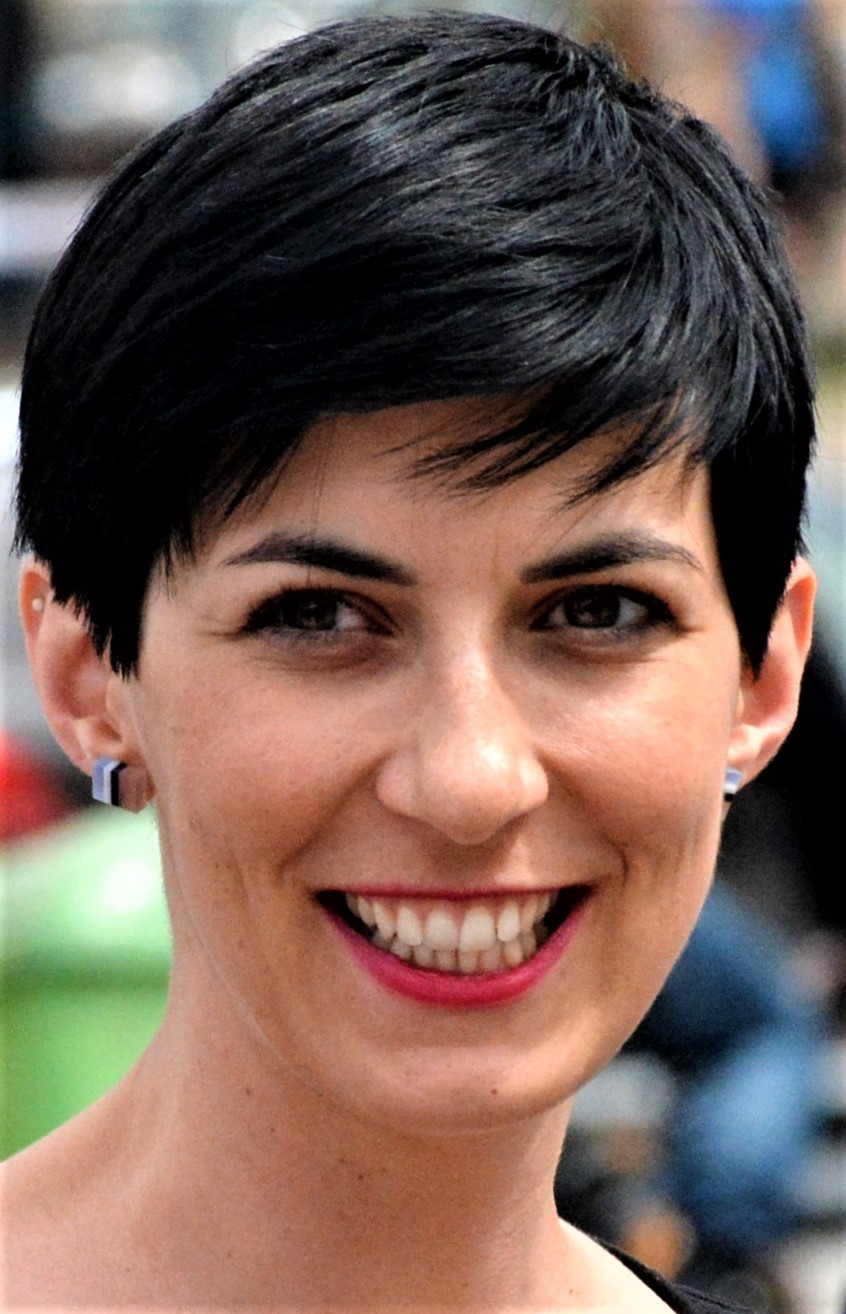
Nominee	Markéta Pekarová Adamová
Party	TOP 09
Electoral vote	163
Percentage	92.6
Leader of TOP 09 before election
Markéta Pekarová Adamová
Elected Leader of TOP 09
Markéta Pekarová Adamová

The Czech political party TOP 09 held a leadership election on 20 November 2021. The incumbent leader Markéta Pekarová Adamová ran unopposed and was reelected.

== Background ==
Pekarová Adamová was elected party leader in 2019. Under her leadership TOP 09 participated in the 2021 Czech parliamentary election as part of the Spolu alliance and received 14 seats in the Chamber of Deputies. Pekarová Adamová herself was then nominated for the position of the Speaker of the Chamber of Deputies. On 5 November 2021 Pekarová Adamová announced her candidacy for party leader. She noted that during her announcement that the party had doubled its number of MPs and joined the coalition government. Pekarová Adamová received the nomination for party leader from 11 regional organisations.

== Candidates ==
- Markéta Pekarová Adamová, the incumbent leader.

== Voting ==
Voting took place on 20 November 2021. Pekarová Adamová was the only candidate and received 163 of 176 votes and thus was reelected.

Candidate	Vote	%
Markéta Pekarová Adamová	163	92.61%
Against	13	7.38%
