= 2019 TOP 09 leadership election =

Internal party poll to replace Jiří Pospíšil as leader

- 24 November 2019
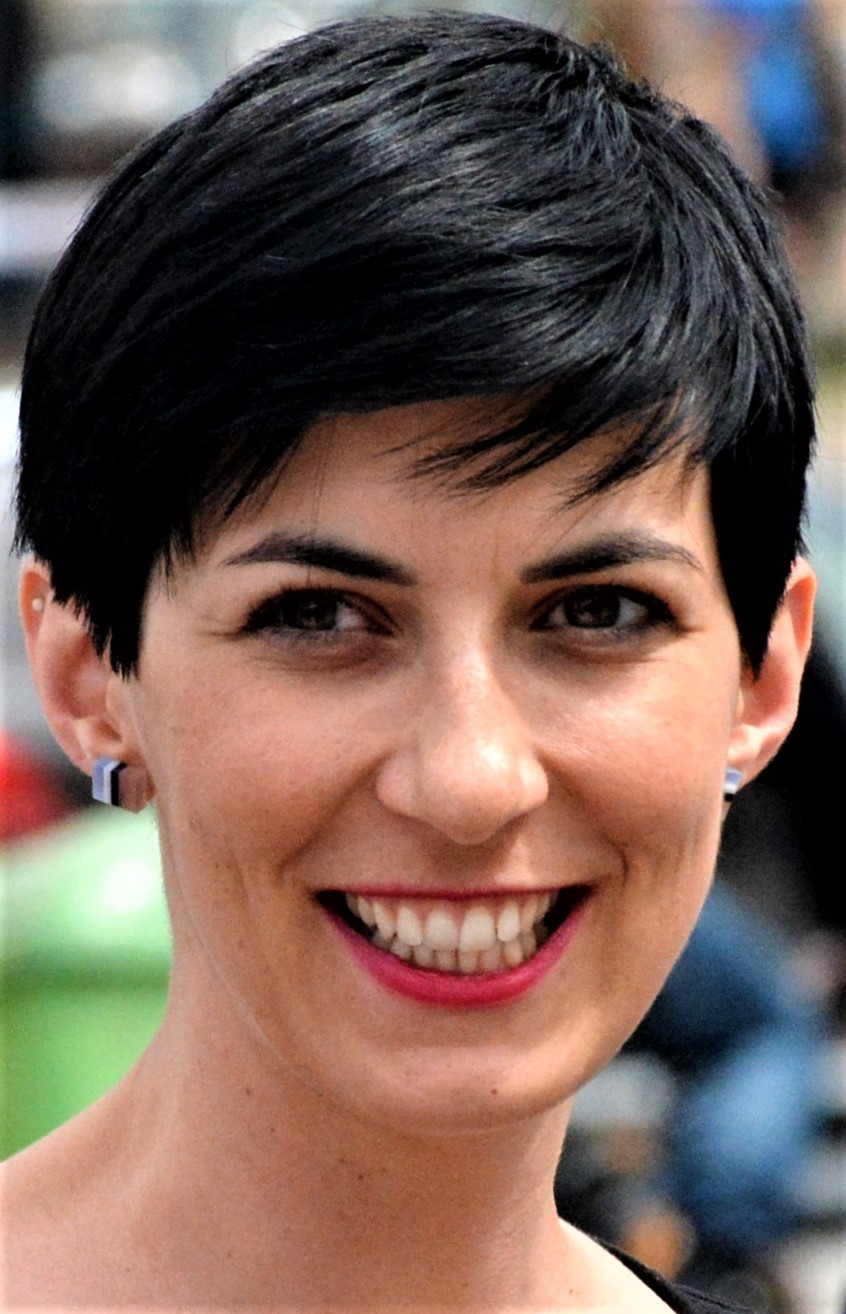

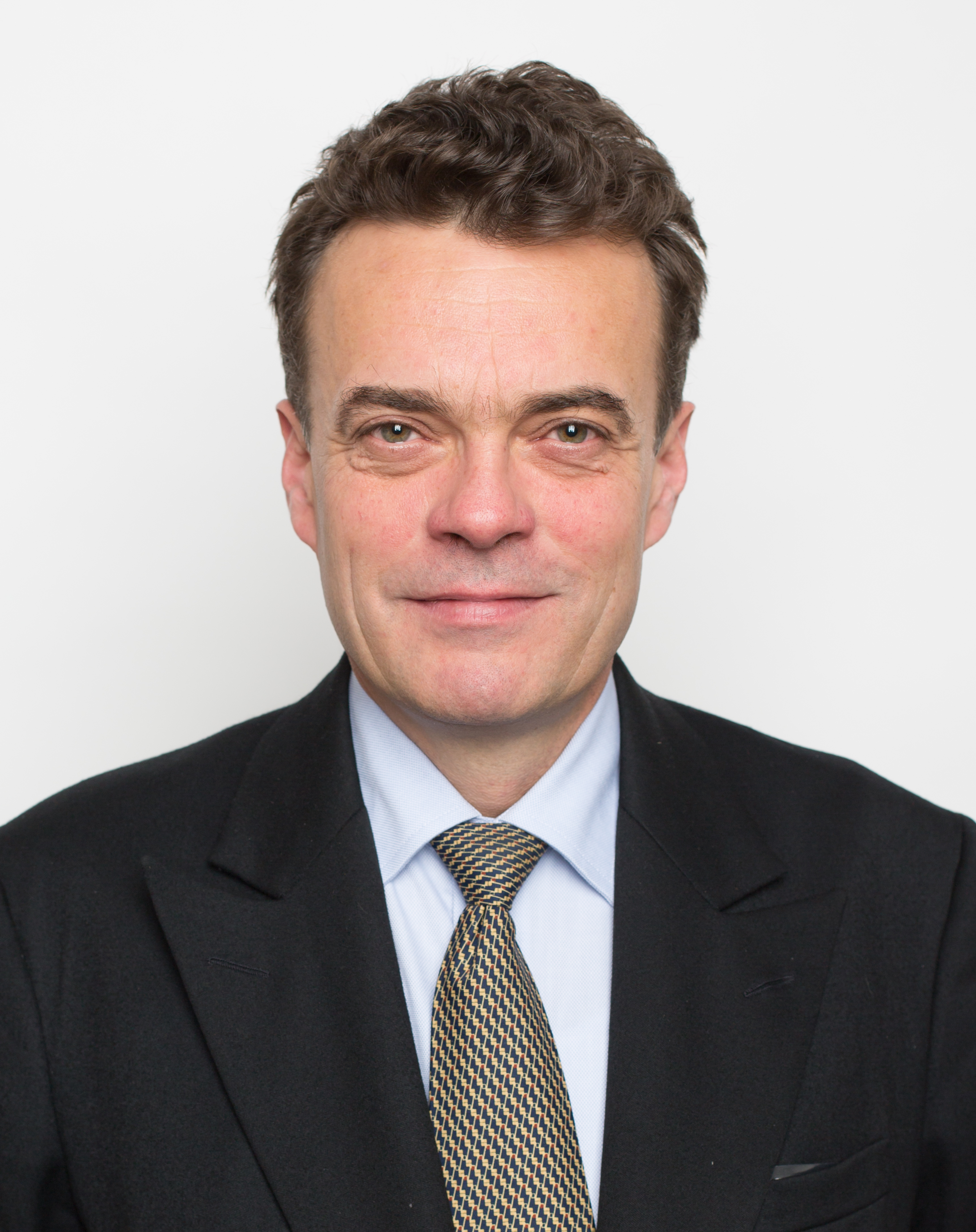
Nominee	Markéta Pekarová Adamová	Tomáš Czernin
Party	TOP 09	TOP 09
Electoral vote	96	81
Percentage	53.9%	45.5%
Leader of TOP 09 before election
Jiří Pospíšil
Elected Leader of TOP 09
Markéta Pekarová Adamová

The Czech political party TOP 09 held a leadership election on 24 November 2019. The incumbent leader Jiří Pospíšil decided not to seek a new term. Markéta Pekarová Adamová was elected the new leader when she defeated Tomáš Czernin.

== Background ==
Speculations about the next leadership election started following the 2019 European election when Miroslav Kalousek criticised incumbent leader Jiří Pospíšil and stated that he hoped he would have a rival at the next election despite refusing to run himself. Deputy leader of the party and Senator Tomáš Czernin announced his candidacy on 21 June 2019. He criticised Pospíšil for his candidacy to European Parliament and noted that he wouldn’t have time to properly run the party. Czernin was endorsed by Kalousek who noted that Czernin "will be a successful leader." Pospíšil hadn’t confirmed his candidacy until that moment. Karel Schwarzenberg also endorsed him.

Jiří Pospíšil announced on 27 August 2019 that he wouldn’t run for a second term and stated that he planned to focus on his work as an MEP. MP Markéta Pekarová Adamová announced her candidacy on the same day. Czernin noted that he considered her candidacy surprising as she had previously stated that she wouldn’t run.

Both candidates campaigned by visiting regional organisations and trying to convince members to support them. The Prague organisation endorsed Pekarová Adamová on 5 November 2019. She was also endorsed by the Liberec, South Bohemian and Plzeň regions. Czernin was, on the orher hand, endorsed by the Central Bohemian region and by the Hradec Králové region.

Czernin stated that he planned to return the party to its conservative roots and to focus on the problems of the countryside such as depopulation and the decline of local services and infrastructure. Pekarová Adamová, on the other hand, presented herself and her TOP 09 as neither fully conservative nor fully liberal but combining both approaches. She also stressed TOP 09 should be put more focus on the regions and expressed the intent to visit a different region every week. However, she was still perceived as the candidate of the urban-based liberal wing. Both stressed the protection of nature as a conservative principle.

== Candidates ==
- Senator Tomáš Czernin supported by Karel Schwarzenberg and Miroslav Kalousek. Considered a member of the conservative wing within the party.
- MP Markéta Pekarová Adamová announced her candidacy on 27 August 2019. She is considered a member of the liberal wing within the party.

=== Declined ===
- Miroslav Kalousek, the former leader was suggested by Jaromír Štětina.
- Jiří Pospíšil, the incumbent leader decided to not run for second term.

== Endorsements ==
This section lists notable party members who endorsed Czernin or Pekarová Adamová.

=== Markéta Pekarová Adamová ===
- Dominik Feri, MP.
- Luděk Niedermayer, MEP.
- Jiří Pospíšil, the incumbent leader.
- Jan Vitula, Deputy leader.

=== Tomáš Czernin ===
- Miroslav Kalousek, MP and former leader.
- Karel Schwarzenberg, MP and former leader.

== Result ==
The election was held on 24 November 2019. 178 delegates voted. Pekarová received 96 votes while Czernin only 81. Pekarová Adamová thus became the new leader.

Candidate	Vote	%
Markéta Pekarová Adamová	96	53.93%
Tomáš Czernin	81	45.51%
Against	1	0.56%
