= TOPAZ (think tank) =

Czech think tank

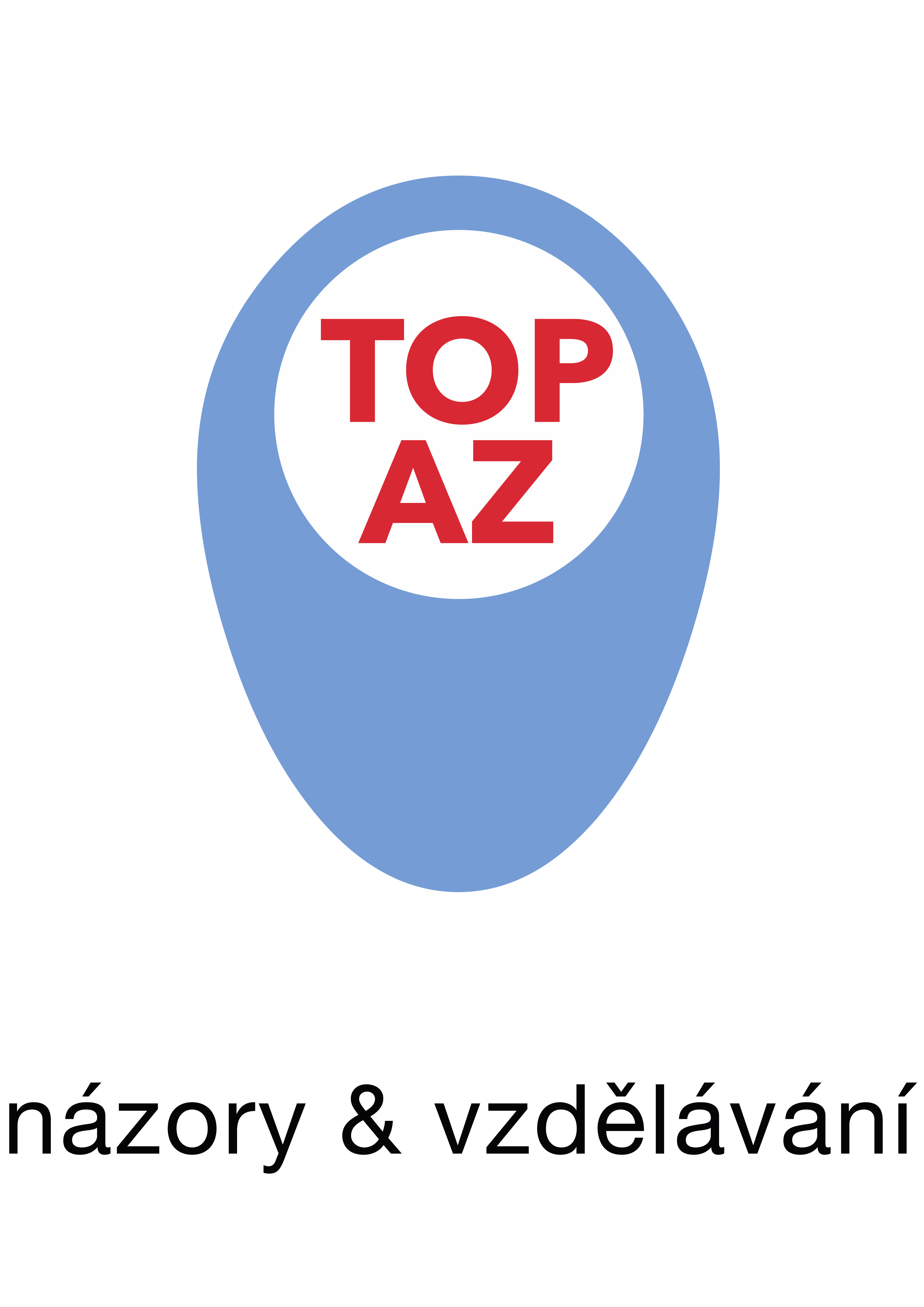
- Founded: 3 April 2012
- Founder: TOP 09
- Type: association
- Purpose: Transmission of conservative ideas to public, Political education
- Location: Prague, Czech Republic
- Website: TOP-AZ.eu (in Czech)

TOPAZ is a think-tank of the Czech political party TOP 09, which is its founder. It was established in April 2012 as a civic group, today it operates as an association.

Mission of TOPAZ is to transmit conservative ideas to wider partisan and non partisan public and to continue in educational activities that were coordinated by TOP 09 Internal Commission for Education in last years. Content of association's activity is discussion about society-wide topics along with independent experts, cooperation with expert committees of TOP 09, fundraising, creation of body alternatives to public administration outcomes and creation of analytical and conceptual materials that deal with individual issues and suggest possibilities of solving.

Establishment of TOPAZ as an educational platform of political party was inspired by similar projects abroad, for instance Political Academy of the Austrian People's Party or Konrad Adenauer Foundation with a bond to the Christian Democratic Union of Germany.

== Association Leadership ==
List of TOPAZ leading organs and its members:

=== Association Director ===
- Karel Schwarzenberg

=== Executive Council ===
- Reda Ifrah – Executive Council Chairman
- Helena Langšádlová
- Jan Husák
- Jan Vitula
- Marek Ženíšek

=== Academic Council ===
- Miroslav Zámečník
- Zdeněk Tůma
- Hynek Jeřábek

== Educational Events and Discussions ==
TOPAZ organizes conferences and seminars focusing on education of TOP 09 members and non partisan public.

Task of this activity is to bring significant personalities and experts to discussion, local civic initiatives and regular civilians including youth. Point of this discussion is to familiarize public with contributions of democracy and membership in the European Union and to present conservative policy values in general. The main point is to search and create new opinions that can be used by TOP 09 in real politics.

== Publication Activity ==
Outcomes from educational events of TOPAZ create collections that contain contributions of conference and seminar guests.

List of collections (date of publication in brackets):

- Electromobility: future development of power engineering and transportation (5. 11. 2015)
- Social living (28. 5. 2015)
- Economy development of Visegrad group (16. 3. 2015)
- Power engineering: threats and chances (10. 11. 2014)
- Smart Cities Memorandum (9. 9. 2014)
- Opinions about Europe (7. 5. 2014)
- Do not be afraid of reforms (20. 9. 2012)
- Election manual of TOP 09 and Mayors (23. 8. 2012)

== Internship Project ==
Through TOPAZ university students have a chance to participate in an internship in statewide office, parliamentary club and regional offices of TOP 09. This project works under association since 2014. TOPAZ cooperates in this project along with Faculty of Social Studies at Masaryk University and Philosophical Faculty of Palacký University, Olomouc, (through programme YoungPower). Trainees come also from Faculty of Social Science at Charles University in Prague or Metropolitan University Prague.

== Partners ==
Partners of TOPAZ are:

- Wilfried Martens Centre for European Studies
- Konrad Adenauer Foundation
- TOP 09

== See also ==
- TOP 09
- Konrad Adenauer Foundation
- Wilfried Martens Centre for European Studies
- Political Academy of the Austrian People's Party
