= 2023 TOP 09 leadership election =

- 11 November 2023
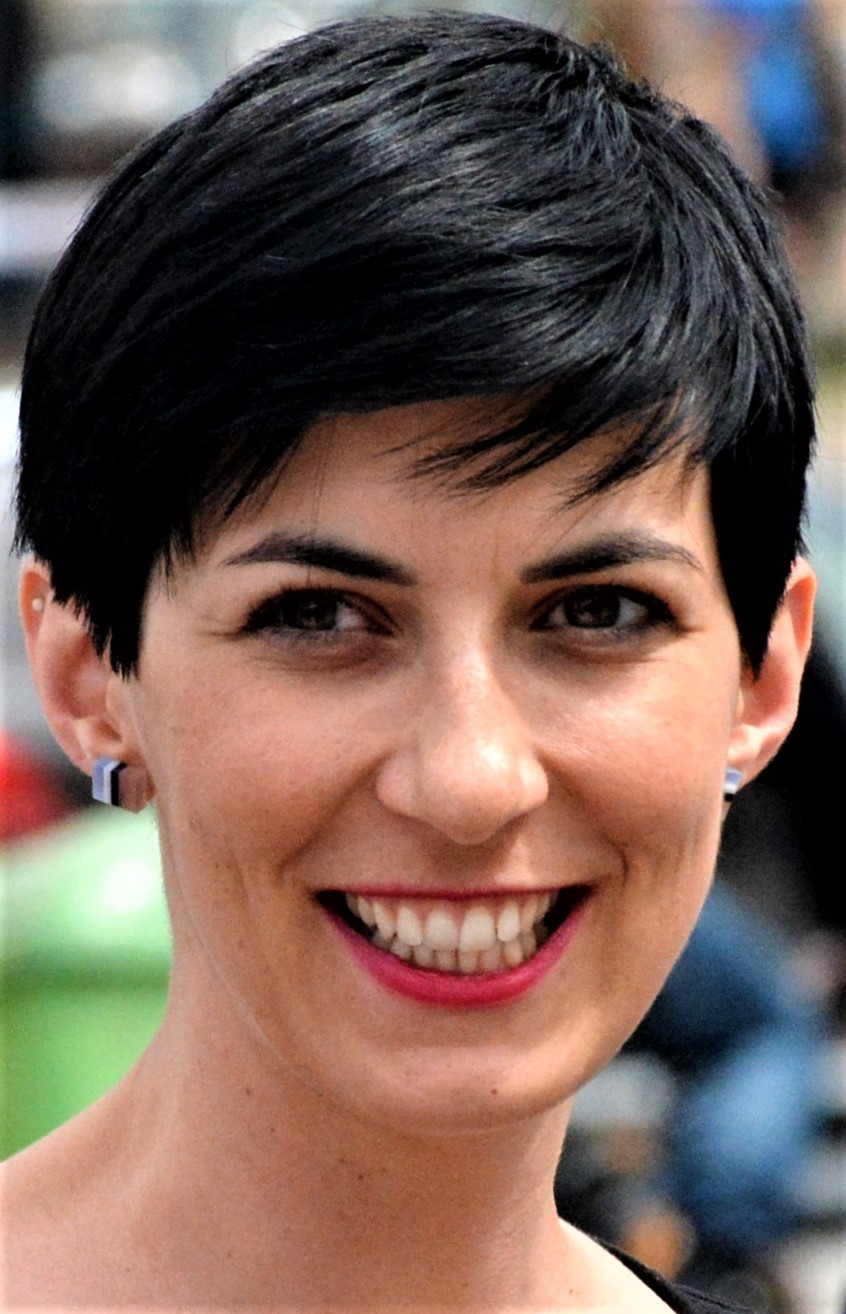
Nominee	Markéta Pekarová Adamová
Party	TOP 09
Electoral vote	142
Percentage	80.2
Leader of TOP 09 before election
Markéta Pekarová Adamová
Elected Leader of TOP 09
Markéta Pekarová Adamová

The Czech political party TOP 09 held a leadership election on 11 November 2023. The incumbent leader Markéta Pekarová Adamová ran unopposed and was reelected.

== Candidates ==
- Markéta Pekarová Adamová, the incumbent leader.

== Voting ==
Voting took place on 11 November 2023. Pekarová Adamová was the only candidate and received 142 of 177 votes and thus was reelected.

Candidate	Vote	%
Markéta Pekarová Adamová	142	80.23%
Against	35	19.77%
