= Democratic Bloc =

Democratic Bloc may refer to:

- Democratic Bloc (Bahrain)
- Democratic Bloc (Peru)
- Democratic Bloc (Czech Republic)
- Democratic Bloc (East Germany)
- Democratic Bloc (Eritrea)
- Democratic Bloc (Estonia)
- Democratic Bloc (Latvia)
- Democratic Bloc (Poland)
- Democratic Bloc (Ukraine)
- Western Bloc
