= Marek Ženíšek =

Czech politician and political scientist

Marek Ženíšek MP
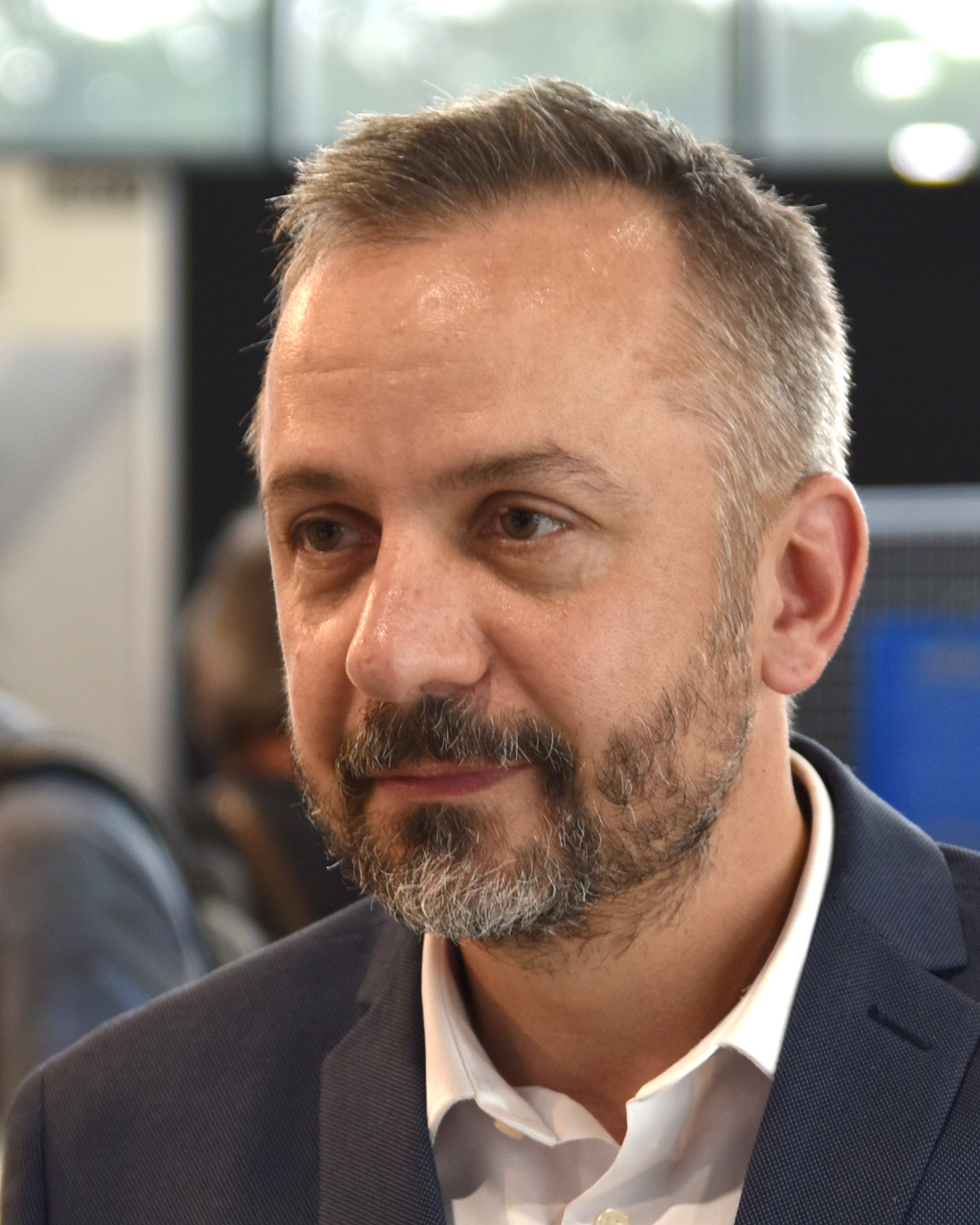
- Marek Ženíšek (2024)

Minister for Science and Research
- In office 16 May 2024 – 15 December 2025
- Prime Minister: Petr Fiala
- Preceded by: Helena Langšádlová

1st Vice-Chairman TOP 09
- In office 29 November 2015 – 26 November 2017
- Preceded by: Miroslav Kalousek
- Succeeded by: Markéta Pekarová Adamová

Member of the Chamber of Deputies
- Incumbent
- Assumed office 9 October 2021
- In office 26 October 2013 – 26 October 2017

Personal details
- Born: Marek Ženíšek; 26 November 1978 (age 47) Plzeň, Czechoslovakia
- Party: TOP 09 (2009 – present); KDU-ČSL (2005 – 2009)
- Children: 2
- Education: University of West Bohemia; Charles University
- Website: marek-zenisek.cz

Marek Ženíšek (born 26 November 1978) is a Czech politician and political scientist, who served as the Czech Minister for Science and Research in the cabinet of Petr Fiala from May 2024 to December 2025. He has been vice-chairman of TOP 09 since November 2025. He was vice-chairman of TOP 09 between 2009 and 2019, and first vice-chairman from 2015 to 2017. He was a member of the Chamber of Deputies from 2013 to 2017, and again from 2021, and has served as Deputy Minister of Justice (2008-2011) and First Deputy Minister of Health (2012-2013). Since 2020, Ženíšek has been a regional assembly member in the Plzeň Region and a Deputy Governor.

== Early life and education ==
Ženíšek was born in Plzeň on 26 November 1978. He graduated from the Faculty of Humanities of the University of West Bohemia in Plzeň (now the Faculty of Arts) and the Faculty of Social Sciences of Charles University in Prague.

== Academic career ==
Ženíšek is the author or co-author of several books and academic articles on political and electoral systems, and is the scientific secretary of the Czech Society for Political Science. Since 2003, he has been lecturing at the Department of Political Science and International Relations of the Faculty of Philosophy of the University of West Bohemia, where he received his doctorate in political science in 2006, and since 2008 also at the Prague Metropolitan University.

== Political career ==
=== Early career ===
From 2005 to 2009, Ženíšek was a member of the Christian and Democratic Union - Czechoslovak People's Party (KDU-ČSL). At the municipal elections in 2006, he was elected as a representative in one of the city districts of Plzeň, holding the mandate until 2010. In 2007, he began working at the Ministry of Justice, from 2008 as Deputy Minister.

=== TOP 09 ===
Ženíšek became a member of the preparatory committee of TOP 09 in June 2009. He was elected vice-chairman at the party's National Constituent Assembly on 27 and 28 November 2009. As vice-chairman he was responsible for foreign relations. Ženíšek was re-elected vice-chairman at the second TOP 09 National Assembly on 22 and 23 October 2011 in Hradec Králové, and the third in Prague on 8 December 2013.

At the beginning of 2012, Ženíšek was appointed First Deputy Minister of Health by Leoš Heger, dealing mainly with the economic management of the ministry and its directly managed organizations. He was involved in the beginning of the long-term project to reform psychiatry in the Czech Republic. In the autumn regional elections in 2012, Ženíšek was elected to the Plzeň Regional Assembly, but resigned this mandate due to the conflict with his role as Deputy Health Minister. He resigned as First Deputy Minister of Health following the inauguration of Jiří Rusnok's government on 1 August 2013, saying he could not imagine continuing at the ministry while also vice-chairman of TOP 09.

=== Parliamentary career ===
In the 2013 parliamentary election, Ženíšek was elected to the Chamber of Deputies as the lead candidate for TOP 09 in the Plzeň Region. In November 2015, at the fourth TOP 09 National Assembly in Prague, he was elected the party's first vice-chairman, receiving 124 votes out of 173 delegates (72%), and replacing Miroslav Kalousek, who became the party's chairman. He was again top of the TOP 09 list at the 2017 parliamentary election, but was not re-elected. At the end of November 2017, he was elected TOP 09 vice-chairman, and was replaced by Markéta Pekarová Adamová as the party's first vice-chairman.

During the 2019 European Parliament election in the Czech Republic, Ženíšek ran as a member of TOP 09 in sixth place on the candidate list "Mayors (STAN) with regional partners and TOP 09", but was not elected. In November 2019, he stood unsuccessfully for re-election as vice-chairman of TOP 09.

In regional elections in 2020, Ženíšek was elected to the Plzeň Regional Assembly as a member of TOP 09, on the list for the "Civic Democratic Party with the support of TOP 09 and independent mayors" group. On 12 November 2020, he became a regional councillor of the Plzeň Region with responsibility for culture and monument care.

In the 2021 Czech parliamentary election, Ženíšek was elected on the list of the Spolu coalition of ODS, KDU-ČSL and TOP 09 in the Plzeň Region.

== Personal life ==
Ženíšek is married and has a son. His leisure interests include reading, sports and traveling.
