= Helena Langšádlová =

Czech politician

Helena Langšádlová MP
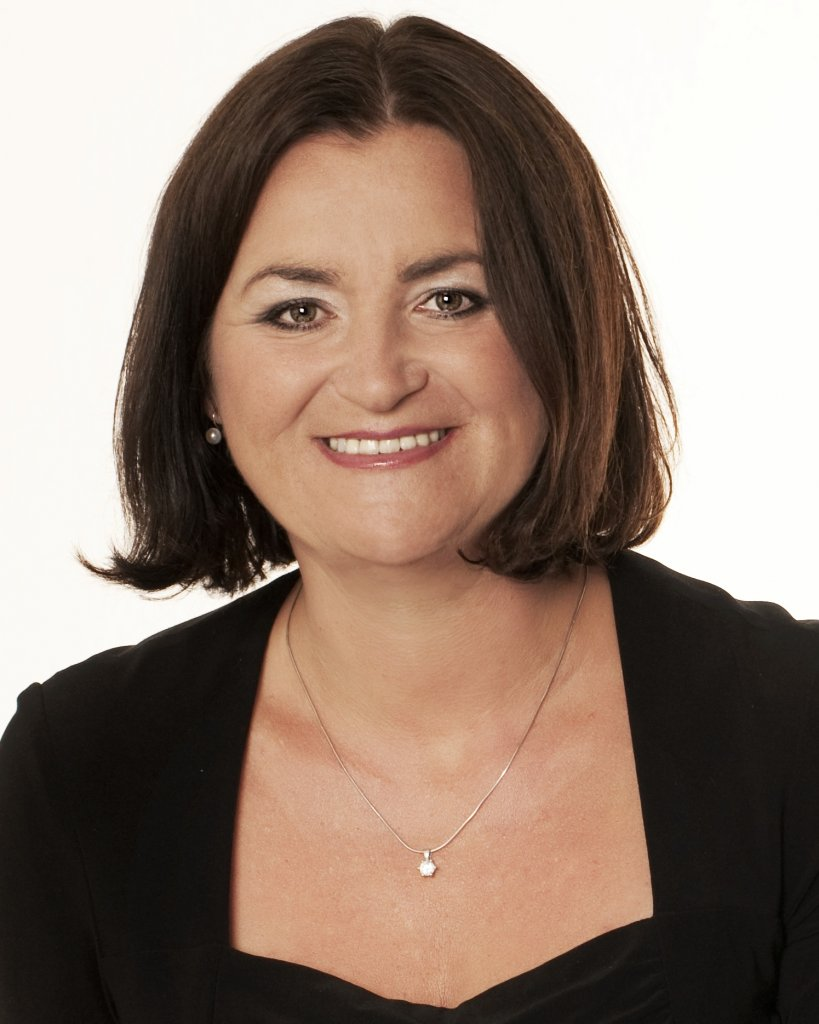
- Langšádlová in 2014

Minister for Science and Research
- In office 17 December 2021 – 5 May 2024
- Prime Minister: Petr Fiala
- Preceded by: Position established
- Succeeded by: Marek Ženíšek

Member of the Chamber of Deputies
- Incumbent
- Assumed office 29 May 2010

Mayor of Černošice
- In office 1988–2006
- Succeeded by: Aleš Rádl

Personal details
- Born: 14 October 1963 (age 62) Prague, Czechoslovakia
- Party: TOP 09 (2009 – present); KDU-ČSL (1998 – 2009)
- Website: helenalangsadlova.cz

Helena Langšádlová (born 14 October 1963) is a Czech politician. From December 2021 to May 2024, she served as the Czech Minister for Science and Research in the Cabinet of Petr Fiala. She has been a member of the Czech parliament since 2010, representing TOP 09.
