= Pavel Zářecký =

Czech politician and lawyer (born 1940)

Chairman of the Legislative Council
- In office 3 December 2009 – 13 July 2010
- Prime Minister: Jan Fischer
- Preceded by: Daniela Kovářová
- Succeeded by: Jiří Pospíšil
- In office 25 April 2005 – 16 August 2006
- Prime Minister: Jiří Paroubek
- Preceded by: Jaroslav Bureš
- Succeeded by: Jiří Pospíšil

Personal details
- Born: 21 April 1940 (age 86) Mělník, Protectorate of Bohemia and Moravia
- Party: KSČ (1966–1969); Independent (nominated by ČSSD)
- Education: Charles University
- Profession: Lawyer

Pavel Zářecký (born 21 April 1940) is a Czech politician and lawyer. He's the former Chairman of the Legislative Council.

== Early life ==
Zářecký is a graduate of the Charles University in Prague. He's married and has one daughter. From 1966 to 1969, he was a member of the Communist Party of Czechoslovakia.

== Chairman of the Legislative Council ==
He is very close to the Czech Social Democratic Party and served in the cabinet of then-Prime Minister Jiří Paroubek in the same position he had held since 30 November 2009.
