= Tábor 2020 =

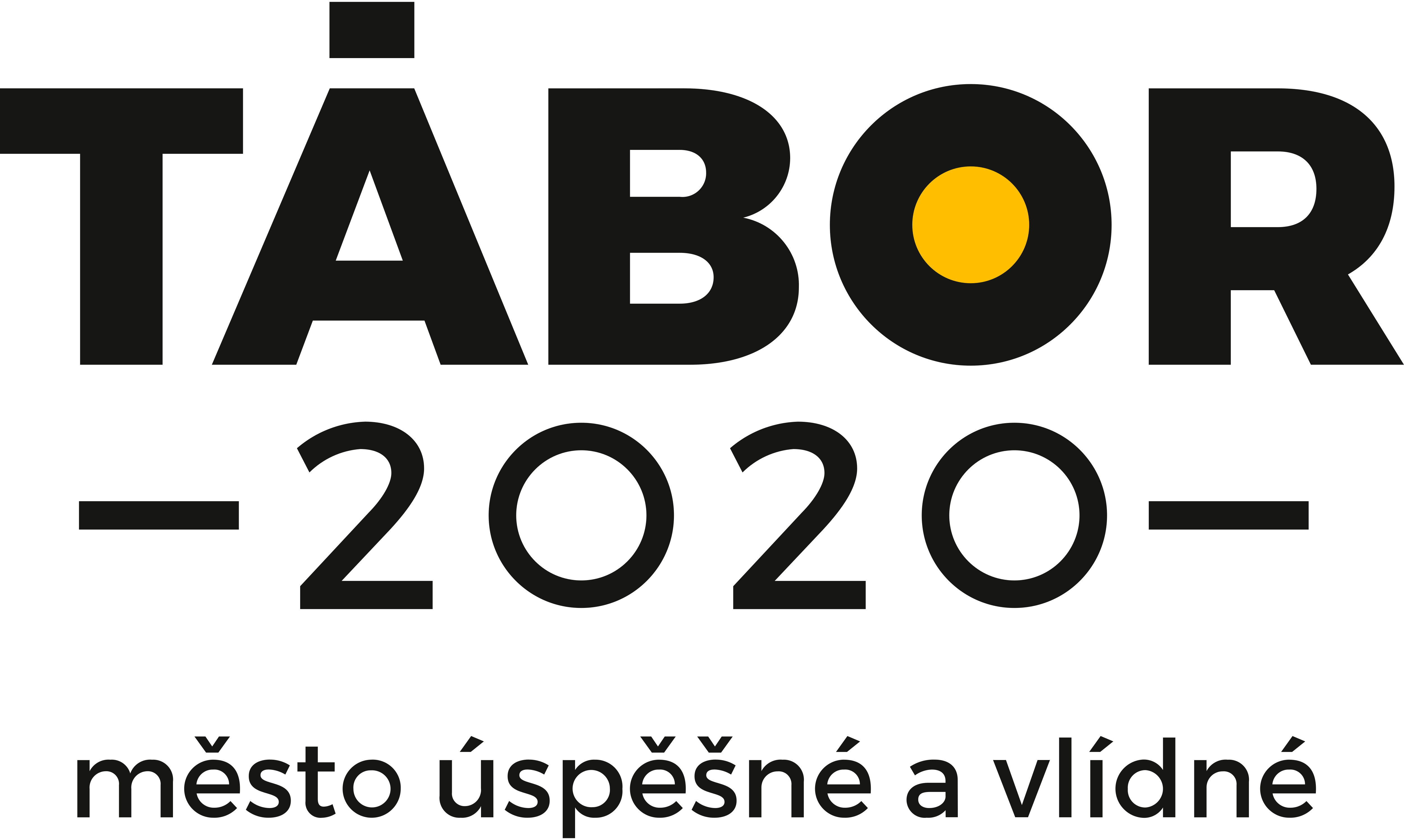
- Abbreviation: T2020
- Chairperson: Petr Havránek
- Founded: 1998
- Ideology: Regionalism
- Political position: Centre-right
- National affiliation: Spolu
- Chamber of Deputies: 0 / 200
- Senate: 1 / 81
- European Parliament: 0 / 21
- South Bohemian Regional Assembly: 2 / 55
- Tábor Town Assembly: 9 / 27

Website
- tabor2020.cz

Tábor 2020 is Czech local political party active in the town of Tábor, founded in 1998. Since 2014, it is the largest party in Tábor, holding the office of Mayor as well as most seats in the Tábor Town Assembly. From 2012, the party is represented in the South Bohemian Regional Assembly and since 2022 in the Senate, controlling the Tábor senate district.

== Electoral results ==
=== Tábor Town Council ===
Year	Vote	Vote %	Seats	+/-	Place
2002	60,158	21.5	6 / 27	▲6	2nd ▲
2006	65,592	23.0	7 / 27	▲1	2nd
2010	59,345	18.9	6 / 27	▼1	3rd ▼
2014	64,934	26.0	8 / 27	▲2	1st ▲
2018	51,975	18.9	6 / 27	▼2	1st
2022	75,029	29.1	9 / 27	▲3	1st

=== South Bohemian Regional Council ===
Year	Vote	Vote %	Seats	+/-
2004 (Note: In coalition with the Green Party and Party for the Open Society)	4,802	3.2	0 / 55	0
2008 (Note: On SNK European Democrats list)	10,024	4.9	0 / 55	0
2012 (Note: In coalition with Jihočeši 2012 and Citizens for Budějovice)	27,972	14.6	1 / 55	▲1
2016 (Note: In coalition with Jihočeši 2012)	10,629	5.8	1 / 55	0
2020 (Note: In coalition with Jihočeši 2012)	13,010	6.5	2 / 55	▲1

=== Senate ===
Year	Vote	Seats	+/-
2022 (Note: Supported by Spolu)	10,676	1 / 27	▲1
