= Democratic Bloc (Czech Republic) =

Democratic Bloc Demokratický blok
- Leader: Petr Fiala
- Founded: 2017
- Dissolved: 2017
- Ideology: Liberal democracy
- Political position: Centre-right
- Coalition Partners: ODS; KDU–ČSL; TOP 09; STAN
- Chamber of Deputies: 48 / 200

Democratic Bloc was a parliamentary alliance formed in 2017 by four Centre-right parties. Parties agreed to cooperate in parliament. Czech Pirate Party and Czech Social Democratic Party were also offered participation but both parties declined. It was announced on 15 November 2017 on a Press Conference by Petr Fiala. Fiala stated that Democratic Bloc isn't meant to be a long term coalition but its only task is to take over initiative during negotiations of parliament's body and for constituent meeting. Democratic Bloc was dissolved on 21 December 2017.

== Formation ==
Formation of the alliance was announced on 15 November 2017 by leader of the Civic Democratic Party Petr Fiala. Parties agreed to cooperate during the upcoming formation of the new Chamber of Deputies. Czech Pirate Party declined to participate. Freedom and Direct Democracy attacked Democratic Bloc and started to negotiate cooperation with Pirate Party. Czech Social Democratic Party also declined to participate. Babiš stated that the Bloc is to defend a system that existed in the Czech Republic for 25 years.
