= Vlastimil Válek =

Czech radiologist and politician

Vlastimil Válek MP
- Válek in 2024

Deputy Prime Minister of the Czech Republic
- In office 17 December 2021 – 15 December 2025
- Prime Minister: Petr Fiala

Minister of Health
- In office 28 November 2021 – 15 December 2025
- Prime Minister: Petr Fiala
- Preceded by: Adam Vojtěch
- Succeeded by: Adam Vojtěch

1st Vice-Chairman of TOP 09
- In office 11 November 2023 – 8 November 2025
- Preceded by: Tomáš Czernin
- Succeeded by: Jiří Pospíšil

Member of the Chamber of Deputies
- Incumbent
- Assumed office 21 October 2017

Personal details
- Born: 17 May 1960 (age 66) Brno, Czechoslovakia (now Czech Republic)
- Party: TOP 09 (2013–present)
- Children: 4
- Education: Masaryk University

Vlastimil Válek (born 17 May 1960) is a Czech radiologist and politician, who served as Deputy Prime Minister and Minister of Health from 17 December 2021 to 15 December 2025, in the cabinet of Petr Fiala. He has been a member of the Chamber of Deputies of the Czech Republic since 2017, representing TOP 09.

== Early life and professional career ==
Válek was born in 1960 in Brno. He spent his childhood in Poštorná and Břeclav, and graduated from Břeclav Gymnazium in 1979. He graduated from the Faculty of Medicine at Masaryk University (MUNI) in 1985 with a degree in radiodiagnostics, and in the same year joined the staff of Brno University Hospital in Bohunice, where he is now head of the Department of Radiology and Nuclear Medicine, focusing on the diagnosis and treatment of abdominal tumors. Since 1993, he has also been working at the MUNI Faculty of Medicine as a professor of radiology. For the period from 2014 to 2017, he was elected chairman of the Czech Radiological Society of the Czech Medical Society JE Purkyně. He has published research in Czech and foreign medical journals, and regularly lectures at foreign conferences and universities.

== Political career ==
In 2010, Válek was elected as a non-partisan for TOP 09 by representatives of the Brno-Líšeň City District. He subsequently joined TOP 09 in 2013 and defended his seat in the 2014 elections. In regional elections in 2012, he was elected to the South Moravian Regional Assembly. In the parliamentary elections in 2017, he was the leader of TOP 09 in the South Moravian Region and was elected to the Chamber of Deputies. In November 2019 he was elected vice-chairman of TOP 09, and in January 2021 also Chairman of the party's parliamentary group. He was re-elected to the Chamber of Deputies in 2021, and subsequently nominated as the Minister of Health in the new government of Petr Fiala. In November 2023 he was elected 1st vice-chairman of TOP 09. In November 2025, he was replaced by Jiří Pospíšil.

== Controversies ==
=== Trips to Dubai ===
In March 2024, Válek flew to Dubai several times to play golf. On one of these trips he was accompanied by Milan Sameš, the head of IT at Aricoma Group, which has won healthcare contracts worth at least tens of millions of crowns from the Czech Ministry of Health, state-owned hospitals, and other healthcare facilities during Válek's tenure as minister. Válek described Sameš as a longtime friend he has known for over 20 years, but said he was unaware of Sameš's profession. "We spend a few days together like this now and then, when we relax on the golf course", he said, explaining his foreign travels. "That's about it, there's nothing else behind it. When we go golfing together, we talk about golf, about wine and about shrimp, we certainly don't talk about work and business".

Fiala commented on the situation, saying he believed there were enough control mechanisms in place when the Health Ministry issued contracts. Political commentator Zvěřina said the situation was "so stupid it's embarrassing", employing a phrase used by Eva Decroix during the 2025 Czech government Bitcoin scandal investigation.

Válek subsequently stated that he had paid for all his own travel to Dubai. He also confirmed that he used a diplomatic passport instead of a citizen's passport when travelling, even though diplomatic passports may only be used for diplomatic travel, which the trip to Dubai did not fulfill. In addition to speculation about influence from the private sphere on Válek, journalists have raised issues of medical ethics during his Dubai visits, as Valek had previously saved Sameš's life when he was his patient.

== Personal life ==
Válek is married and has four children. He lives in the Líšeň district of Brno. His interests include dulcimer music, choral singing, literature and Czech art.
