= Jan Jakob =

Czech politician (born 1982)

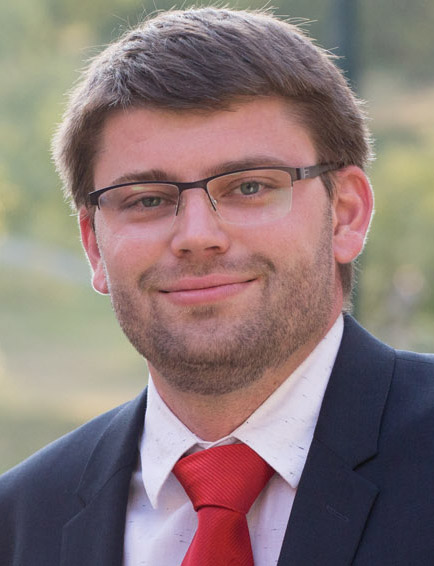
- Jakob in 2017

Member of the Chamber of Deputies
- Incumbent
- Assumed office 19 January 2021
- Preceded by: Miroslav Kalousek
- Constituency: Central Bohemian Region

Personal details
- Born: 2 December 1982 (age 43) Vsetín, Czechoslovakia
- Party: KDU-ČSL (2008–2009); TOP 09 (2009–)

Jan Jakob (born 2 December 1982) is a Czech politician serving as a member of the Chamber of Deputies for TOP 09 since 2021. From 2010 to 2022, he served as mayor of Roztoky.
