= Luděk Niedermayer =

Czech politician and economist (born 1966)

Luděk Niedermayer MEP
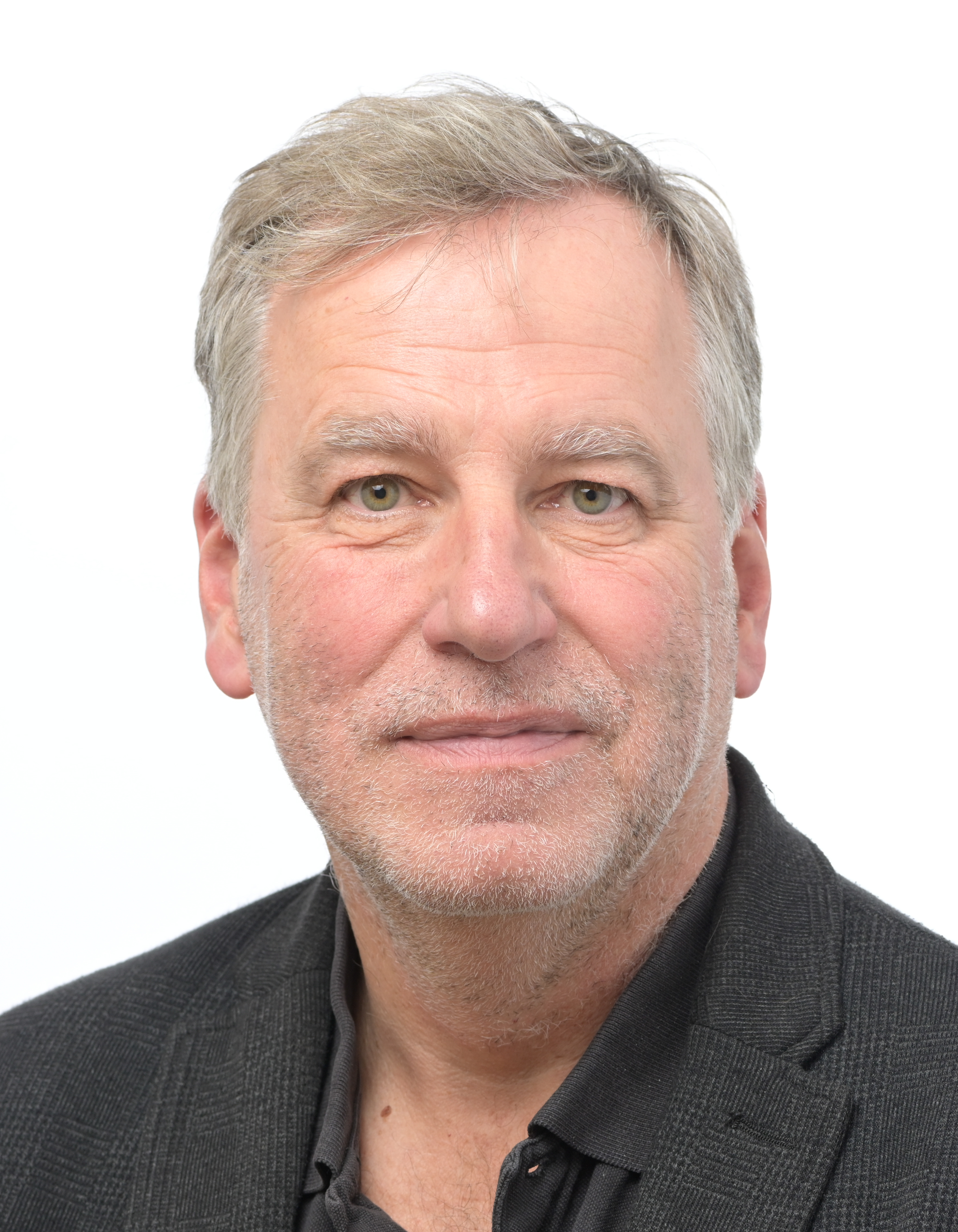
- Official portrait, 2024

Member of the European Parliament
- Incumbent
- Assumed office 1 July 2014
- Constituency: Czech Republic

Personal details
- Born: 13 March 1966 (age 60) Brno, Czechoslovakia (now Czech Republic)
- Party: Czech: TOP 09; European Union: European People's Party
- Education: Jan Evangelista Purkyně University (now Masaryk University)

Luděk Niedermayer (born 13 March 1966) is a Czech politician and economist, serving as a Member of the European Parliament (MEP) for the Czech Republic since July 2014, representing TOP 09, part of the European People's Party. He also currently serves as Vice-Chair of the Committee on Economic and Monetary Affairs in the European Parliament.

Prior to entering European politics Niedermayer was an economist, holding a number of public and private sector roles.

== Career before politics ==
Niedermayer studied theoretical cybernetics, mathematical informatics and systems theory at Jan Evangelista Purkyně University (now Masaryk University), completing his education in 1989. From 1991 until 2008 he was employed at the Czech National Bank, serving in various roles including as a director, member of the Bank's board and as Vice‑Governor. From 2008 until his election in 2014 he was employed by Deloitte Czech Republic as a director. Niedermayer also held a number of senior roles within international financial administration, including a term as member of a working group of the Bank for International Settlements and Representative of the Czech Republic at meetings of the International Monetary Fund and International Bank for Reconstruction and Development. Additionally, from 2005 until 2008 he chaired the Scientific Council of the Czech Banking Association.

== Parliamentary service ==
- Member, Committee on Economic and Monetary Affairs (2014-)
- Member, Delegation for relations with the United States (2014-)
- Member, Committee of Inquiry to investigate alleged contraventions and maladministration in the application of Union law in relation to money laundering, tax avoidance and tax evasion (2016-)
- Member, Special Committee on Tax Rulings and Other Measures Similar in Nature or Effect (TAXE 2) (2015-2016)
- Member, Special Committee on Tax Rulings and Other Measures Similar in Nature or Effect (2015)
