= Spolu =

Political alliance in the Czech Republic

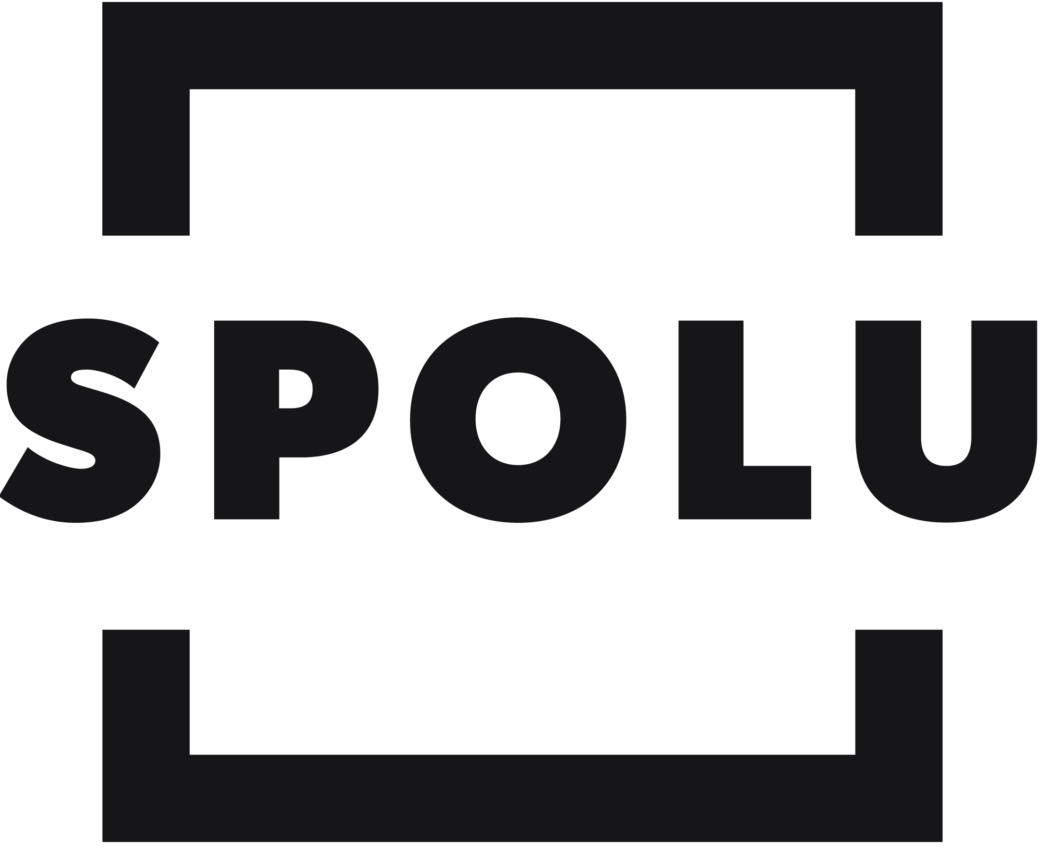
- English name: Together
- Leader: Petr Fiala
- Founders: Petr Fiala; Marian Jurečka; Markéta Pekarová Adamová
- Founded: 9 December 2020
- Dissolved: 17 January 2026
- Ideology: Liberal conservatism Christian democracy
- Political position: Centre-right
- Colours: Green and orange (2025–2026); Blue (2020–2025)
- Member parties: ODS; KDU-ČSL; TOP 09

Website
- spolu25.cz

Spolu (lit. 'Together', stylized as SPOLU) was a Czech centre-right political alliance composed of the Civic Democratic Party (ODS), KDU-ČSL, and TOP 09. The alliance was formed ahead of the 2021 parliamentary election, which it won, forming a coalition government with the Pirates and Mayors alliance, with Petr Fiala as prime minister. Spolu competed again in the 2025 election, but lost the election to ANO 2011.

== History ==
=== Precursor cooperation ===
Following the 2017 parliamentary election, the Civic Democratic Party (ODS), KDU-ČSL, TOP 09 and Mayors and Independents (STAN) formed the Democratic Bloc to cooperate during negotiations over parliamentary offices. After these positions were filled, Petr Fiala announced the end of the Democratic Bloc, but stated that he was open to cooperating with these parties in the future.

In 2019, Milion chvilek pro demokracii started encouraging ODS, KDU-ČSL, TOP 09, STAN and the Czech Pirate Party to cooperate in the 2021 parliamentary election, in order to prevent vote splitting and ensure that the smaller parties would not be disadvantaged by the Czech electoral system. On 5 November 2019, ODS, KDU-ČSL, TOP 09 and STAN signed an agreement to jointly promote five "safeguards for a lawful and secure state".

=== Formation of Spolu ===
Following the 2020 regional elections, the Civic Democratic Party, KDU-ČSL and TOP 09 began negotiations about a potential centre-right electoral alliance for the 2021 parliamentary election.

The ODS leadership agreed to form an alliance with the other parties on 25 October 2020. Two days later, party leaders Petr Fiala, Marian Jurečka and Markéta Pekarová Adamová signed a memorandum and announced that ODS, KDU-ČSL and TOP 09 would form an electoral alliance for the next legislative election, with ODS leader Fiala as the alliance's candidate for prime minister. On 11 November 2020, the parties agreed that ODS would nominate the leaders of the election lists in nine regions, KDU-ČSL in three regions, and TOP 09 in two regions. The alliance was labelled by the media as the Three-Coalition, but on 9 December 2020 the parties announced that they would run under the name Spolu (lit. 'Together'), as well as introducing their shared electoral programme and the logo of the coalition.

On 6 January 2021, the coalition was approached by Koruna Česká, the Conservative Party and KAN for potential cooperation. The three parties called the proposition the "Three Kings Offer", a reference to the Three King's Day. This cooperation fell through. On 17 January it was announced that the leader of Independents would run with Spolu, and on 15 September 2021 the coalition signed a memorandum with SNK-ED about its support of the coalition.

=== 2021 Parliamentary election ===
On 11 April 2021, the Civic Democratic Party, KDU-ČSL and TOP 09 signed the coalition agreement, and introduced a new logo and their priorities. The slogan of the campaign was "We will put Czechia back together" (Czech: Dáme Česko dohromady).

The coalition officially started their campaign on 19 May 2021, on Moravian Square in Brno. TOP 09 MP Dominik Feri launched "I have a Voice" (Czech: Mám hlas), a campaign targeting young voters and first-time voters. Following subsequent allegations from multiple women of sexual harassment and assault by Feri, including rape allegations, this part of the campaign's website was removed from the internet. Following these developments, Spolu sought a replacement for Feri on their Prague list who was capable of attracting liberal urban voters. One potential candidate was Jan Čižinský, Mayor of Prague 7 for Praha Sobě, who had suspended his KDU-ČSL membership at the time. Čižinský’s supporters included Alexandra Udženija (ODS), Markéta Pekarová Adamová (TOP 09) and Marian Jurečka (KDU-ČSL), while those opposed included Jana Černochová (ODS) and the Prague branches of KDU-ČSL and TOP 09. Spolu also launched a new campaign targeting young voters called "We are going to Vote" (Czech: Jdeme volit) to replace the "I have a Voice" campaign. Each party had its own main face of the campaign: Jiří Havránek (ODS), Radovan Gaudyn (KDU-ČSL) and Matěj Ondřej Havel (TOP 09).

The chair of Spolu's election campaign committee was ODS deputy leader Zbyněk Stanjura, and the vice-chair was MEP and KDU-ČSL deputy leader Tomáš Zdechovský, who also participated in the door-to-door campaign.

Ahead of the election, opinion polls suggested that ANO 2011 would win, but in an electoral upset, Spolu won the highest number of votes, and opposition parties won a majority of seats in the Chamber of Deputies.

=== Formation of the government ===
The opposition parties signed a memorandum agreeing to nominate Spolu leader Petr Fiala for the position of prime minister. On 9 November, President Miloš Zeman formally asked Fiala to form a new government. On 17 November 2021, Fiala introduced Zeman to his proposed cabinet, and Zeman agreed to appoint Fiala as the new prime minister on 26 November 2021.

=== 2022 Senate and Municipal elections ===
In November 2021, Fiala said he would like to continue with the Spolu coalition into the 2022 Senate and municipal elections. On 14 June 2022, Spolu announced that the coalition would nominate 19 candidates in the senate elections. The leadership of the three parties wanted Spolu to run together in municipal elections to indicate that it was not just a coalition for one election. The Spolu coalition ran together in six of the Czech regional capitals: Prague, Ostrava, Plzeň, Olomouc, Pardubice and Karlovy Vary. In others, including Ústí nad Labem and Brno, the parties of the Spolu coalition ran under the name Společně, due to a deal between the parties that prevented them from using the Spolu brand when one of the parties was missing from the coalition.

Compositions of SPOLU/SPOLEČNĚ coalitions in regional capitals
City	Coalition name	Leader	ODS	KDU-ČSL	TOP 09
Prague	SPOLU	Bohuslav Svoboda (ODS)	Yes	Yes	Yes
Brno	SPOLEČNĚ	Markéta Vaňková (ODS)	Yes	No (Note: KDU-ČSL ran with STAN)	Yes
České Budějovice	SPOLEČNĚ (Note: full name: KDU-ČSL a TOP 09 - Společně pro Budějovice)	Tomáš Bouzek (TOP 09)	No	Yes	Yes
Hradec Králové			No	No (Note: Ran under the name: Koalice pro Hradec)	No (Note: TOP 09 ran together with LES, HP and HDK under the full name: Hradecký demokratický klub a TOP 09 s podporou Hradeckých patriotů a LES)
Jihlava	ODS and KDU-ČSL	Petr Ryška (ODS)	Yes	Yes	No (Note: Ran together with Zelení under the name: Žijeme Jihlavou)
Karlovy Vary	SPOLU	Jiří Vaněček (ODS)	Yes	Yes	Yes
Liberec	SPOLEČNĚ (Note: full name: ODS SPOLEČNĚ SE SPORTOVCI)	Petr Židek (ODS)	Yes (Note: ran together with Sportovci)	No (Note: ran together with SLK)	No (Note: ran together with SLK)
Olomouc	SPOLU	Markéta Záleská (ODS)	Yes	Yes	Yes
Ostrava	SPOLU	Jan Dohnal (ODS)	Yes	Yes	Yes
Pardubice	SPOLU	Jan Mazuch (ODS)	Yes	Yes	Yes
Plzeň	SPOLU	David Šlouf (ODS)	Yes	Yes	Yes
Ústí nad Labem	SPOLEČNĚ (Note: full name: SPOLEČNĚ Ústí nad Labem)	Zbyněk Novák (KDU-ČSL)	No	Yes	Yes
Zlín	KDU-ČSL with support of TOP 09 (Note: full name: KDU-ČSL s podporou TOP 09 a nezávislých kandidátů)	Vojtěch Volf (KDU-ČSL)	No	Yes	Yes

=== 2023 Presidential election ===
In the 2023 Czech presidential election, Spolu endorsed three candidates: Petr Pavel, Danuše Nerudová, and Pavel Fischer.

=== 2024 European Parliament election and Regional elections ===
In the 2024 European Parliament elections, ODS, KDU-ČSL, and TOP 09 ran again as part of the Spolu coalition, which won six seats and finished in second place behind ANO 2011. In some regions, parties ran as the SPOLU coalition in the 2024 regional elections, for example in the Central Bohemian Region, the South Moravian Region, and the Liberec Region.

=== 2025 Parliamentary election ===
On 28 October 2024, party leaders signed a memorandum and announced that ODS, KDU-ČSL and TOP 09 would continue as an electoral alliance for the 2025 parliamentary election. Spolu received 23.4% of the vote, losing the election to ANO 2011.

On 17 January 2026, following his election as leader of ODS, Martin Kupka announced that the alliance would remain dormant for at least four years.

== Composition ==
Name	Ideology	Leader/Leaders	MPs	Senators	MEPs
Civic Democratic Party	Conservatism	Martin Kupka	27 / 200	19 / 81	3 / 21
KDU-ČSL	Christian democracy	Marek Výborný	16 / 200	12 / 81	1 / 21
TOP 09	Liberal conservatism	Matěj Ondřej Havel	9 / 200	7 / 81	2 / 21

== Regional leaders in the 2021 election ==
Region	Leader		Election result	
Region	Name	Party	Votes	Seats
Prague	Markéta Pekarová Adamová	TOP 09	40.0%	11 / 23
Central Bohemian	Jan Skopeček	ODS	28.7%	10 / 26
South Bohemian	Jan Bauer	ODS	29.1%	5 / 13
Plzeň	Martin Baxa	ODS	26.6%	4 / 11
Karlovy Vary	Jan Bureš	ODS	20.2%	1 / 5
Ústí nad Labem	Karel Krejza	ODS	19.8%	3 / 14
Liberec	Petr Beitl	ODS	22.8%	2 / 8
Hradec Králové	Ivan Adamec	ODS	28.6%	4 / 11
Pardubice	Pavel Svoboda	TOP 09	28.5%	4 / 10
Vysočina	Vít Kaňkovský	KDU-ČSL	28.0%	4 / 10
South Moravian	Petr Fiala	ODS	30.0%	9 / 23
Olomouc	Marian Jurečka	KDU-ČSL	24.5%	4 / 12
Zlín	Ondřej Benešík	KDU-ČSL	27.8%	4 / 12
Moravian-Silesian	Zbyněk Stanjura	ODS	20.6%	6 / 22

== Regional leaders in the 2025 election ==
Region	Leader		Election result	
Region	Name	Party	Votes	Seats
Prague	Jana Černochová	ODS	33.9%	9 / 23
Central Bohemian	Martin Kupka	ODS	24.3%	7 / 26
South Bohemian	Jan Bauer	ODS	23.6%	3 / 12
Plzeň	Martin Baxa	ODS	21.0%	3 / 12
Karlovy Vary	Jan Bureš	ODS	15.4%	1 / 4
Ústí nad Labem	Michal Kučera	TOP 09	15.4%	2 / 13
Liberec	Petr Beitl	ODS	18.1%	1 / 6
Hradec Králové	Matěj Ondřej Havel	TOP 09	23.6%	3 / 11
Pardubice	Marek Výborný	KDU-ČSL	23.6%	3 / 11
Vysočina	Eva Decroix	ODS	23.3%	3 / 11
South Moravian	Petr Fiala	ODS	27.2%	7 / 24
Olomouc	Marian Jurečka	KDU-ČSL	20.1%	3 / 13
Zlín	Stanislav Blaha	ODS	24.2%	3 / 12
Moravian-Silesian	Zbyněk Stanjura	ODS	18.0%	4 / 22

== Election results ==
=== Chamber of Deputies ===
Year	Leader	Vote	Vote %	Seats	+/-	Place	Position
2021	Petr Fiala	1,493,905	27.79	71 / 200	▲29	1st	Government
2025	Petr Fiala	1,313,346	23.36	52 / 200	▼19	▼2nd	Opposition

=== Senate ===
Election	Candidates	First round				Second round			Seats	Total Seats	Notes
Election	Candidates	Votes	%	Runners-up	Place^{*}	Votes	%	Place^{*}	Seats	Total Seats	Notes
2022	31	360,539	32.40	19 / 27	1st	233,294	47.80	1st	19 / 27	42 / 81	Including Tábor 2020 candidate who ran under Spolu.

=== Presidential ===
Election	Candidate	First round result			Second round result		
Election	Candidate	Votes	%	Result	Votes	%	Result
2023 (Note: The coalition supported 3 independent candidates for this election.)	Petr Pavel	1,975,056	35.40	1st place	3,358,926	58.33	Won
2023	Danuše Nerudová	777,080	13.93	3rd place	supported Petr Pavel		
2023	Pavel Fischer	376,705	6.75	4th place	supported Petr Pavel		

=== European Parliament ===
Election	List leader	Votes	%	Seats	+/–	EP Group
2024	Alexandr Vondra	661,250	22.25 (#2)	6 / 21	New	ECR / EPP

=== Local election ===
Year	Vote	Vote %	Place	Seats
2022	13,362,433	21.76	1st	5,974 / 61,780

=== Prague municipal elections ===
Year	Leader	Vote	Vote %	Seats	+/−	Place	Position
2022	Bohuslav Svoboda	5,828,523	24.7	19 / 65	▼4	1st	Coalition
2026	Tomáš Portlík	5,422,670	22.1	17 / 65	▼2	2nd	Coalition
