= Jiří Pospíšil =

Czech politician (born 1975)

- Pospíšil in 2023

Leader of TOP 09
- In office 26 November 2017 – 24 November 2019
- Preceded by: Miroslav Kalousek
- Succeeded by: Markéta Pekarová Adamová

Minister of Justice
- In office 13 July 2010 – 27 June 2012
- Prime Minister: Petr Nečas
- Preceded by: Daniela Kovářová
- Succeeded by: Pavel Blažek
- In office 4 September 2006 – 8 May 2009
- Prime Minister: Mirek Topolánek
- Preceded by: Pavel Němec
- Succeeded by: Daniela Kovářová

Member of the Chamber of Deputies
- In office 15 June 2002 – 20 June 2014

Member of the European Parliament for Czech Republic
- In office 1 July 2014 – 15 July 2024

Chairman of the Government Legislative Council
- In office 13 July 2010 – 13 July 2011
- Prime Minister: Petr Nečas
- Preceded by: Pavel Zářecký
- Succeeded by: Karolína Peake
- In office 4 September 2006 – 9 January 2007
- Prime Minister: Mirek Topolánek
- Preceded by: Pavel Zářecký
- Succeeded by: Cyril Svoboda

1st Vice-Chairman of TOP 09
- Incumbent
- Assumed office 8 November 2025
- Preceded by: Vlastimil Válek

Personal details
- Born: 24 November 1975 (age 50) Chomutov, Czechoslovakia
- Party: Civic Democratic Alliance (1994–1998); Civic Democratic Party (1998–2014); Independent as TOP 09 (2014–2017); TOP 09 (2017–)
- Profession: Lawyer

Jiří Pospíšil (born 24 November 1975) is a Czech politician, who was leader of TOP 09 from November 2017 until November 2019. As a deputy for the Civic Democratic Party, Pospíšil served twice as Czech Minister of Justice: between 2006 and 2009 under Prime Minister Mirek Topolánek, and then again from 2010 to 2012 in the government of Petr Nečas. Pospíšil was a member of the Chamber of Deputies (MP) from 2002 to 2014.

== Career ==
Born in Chomutov, Pospíšil graduated from the Faculty of Law at the University of West Bohemia in 1999. From 2009 to 2010, he was the Dean of the same faculty. From 2010 until June 2012 he was Justice Minister again, in the Government of Petr Nečas.

Pospíšil, a former member of the Civic Democratic Party (ODS), ran in the 2014 European Parliament election for TOP 09. He received the most preferential votes of all candidates in the election.

On 26 November 2017, he was elected leader of TOP 09, replacing co-founder Miroslav Kalousek. He stepped down as leader on 24 November 2019.

On 8 November 2025, Pospíšil was elected 1st vice-chairman of TOP 09, replacing Minister of Health Vlastimil Válek.

== Personal life ==
In February 2025, the Expres.cz server reported that Pospíšil's partner is Jan Šašek, a politician in Plzen, who has been appearing by his side for many years, and that the couple would have a daughter to be born in April 2025 to a surrogate mother. The daughter will be named Meda after the patron of the arts Meda Mládková, to whom Pospíšil was very close. In March 2025 Pospíšil confirmed that he lives with a male partner and that their child is being carried by a surrogate mother.
