= Matěj Ondřej Havel =

Czech politician (born 1987)

Member of the Chamber of Deputies
- Incumbent
- Assumed office 9 October 2021
- Constituency: Hradec Králové Region

Leader of TOP 09
- Incumbent
- Assumed office 8 November 2025
- Preceded by: Markéta Pekarová Adamová

Personal details
- Born: 12 February 1987 (age 39) Hradec Králové, Czechoslovakia
- Party: TOP 09 (2017–)
- Education: Charles University; University of Hradec Králové

Matěj Ondřej Havel (born 12 February 1987) is a Czech politician serving as a member of the Chamber of Deputies since 2021 and as leader of TOP 09 since November 2025. He served as deputy leader of TOP 09 from 2023 to 2025.
