= Markéta Pekarová Adamová =

Czech politician (born 1984)

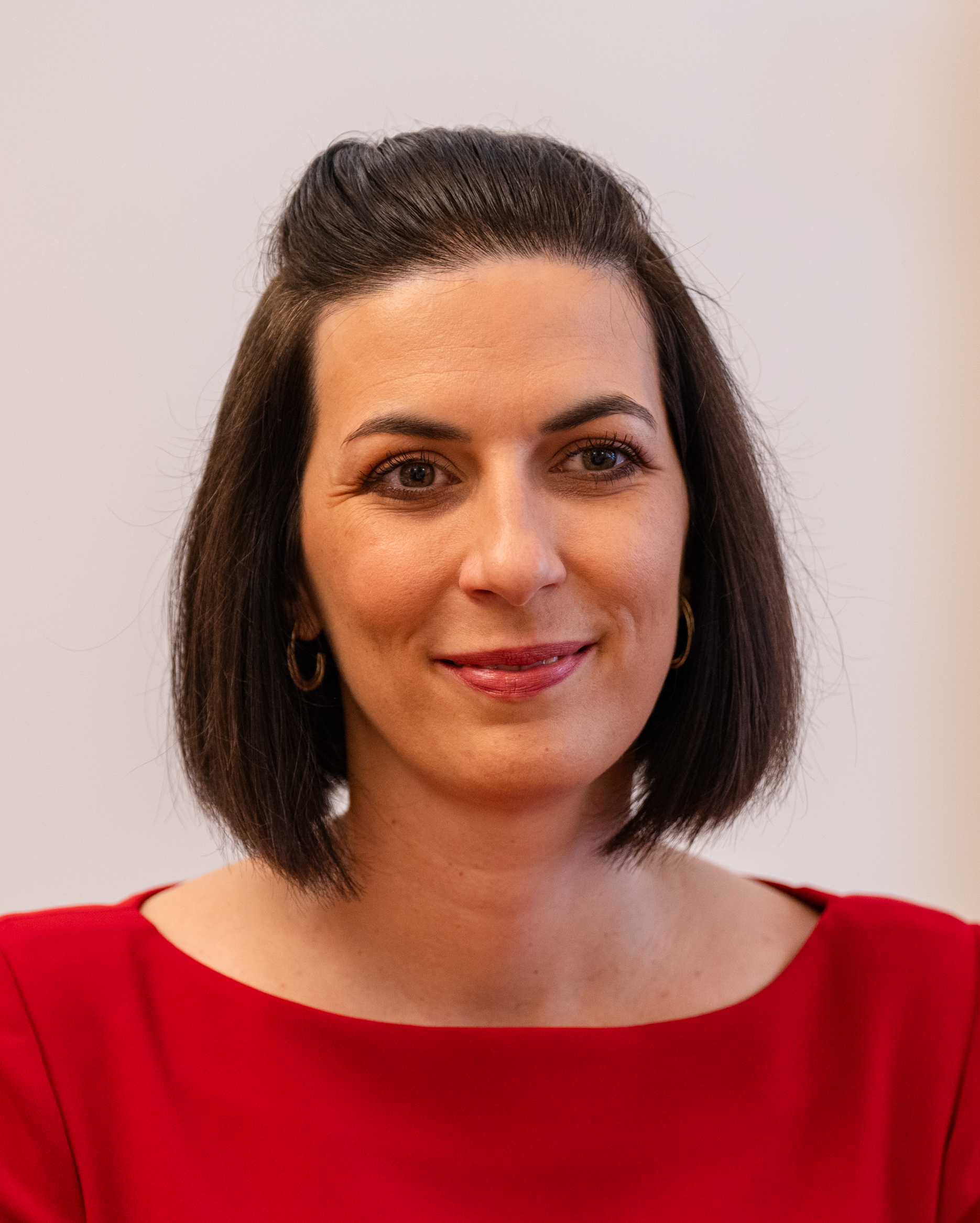
- Pekarová Adamová in 2024

President of the Chamber of Deputies
- In office 10 November 2021 – 8 October 2025
- Preceded by: Radek Vondráček
- Succeeded by: Tomio Okamura

Leader of TOP 09
- In office 24 November 2019 – 8 November 2025
- Preceded by: Jiří Pospíšil
- Succeeded by: Matěj Ondřej Havel

Member of the Chamber of Deputies
- In office 26 October 2013 – 8 October 2025

Personal details
- Born: 2 October 1984 (age 42) Litomyšl, Czechoslovakia
- Party: TOP 09
- Other political affiliations: SPOLU (since 2020)
- Spouse: Tomáš Pekara (m. 2016)
- Education: Charles University, Czech Technical University in Prague
- Website: www.marketaadamova.cz

Markéta Pekarová Adamová (born 2 October 1984) is a Czech politician who served as the President of the Chamber of Deputies from 2021 to 2025 and as leader of TOP 09 from 2019 to 2025. Pekarová Adamová was a member of the Chamber of Deputies from 2013 until 2025, when she decided not to seek re-election.

== Early life and education ==
Pekarová Adamová was born on 2 October 1984 in Litomyšl, Czechoslovakia (now the Czech Republic). She graduated with a bachelor's degree from the Faculty of Arts, Charles University in Prague in 2008, and a master's degree from the Czech Technical University in Prague in 2011.

== Political career ==
=== Early political career ===
Pekarová Adamová joined newly created political party TOP 09 in 2009. A year later, in the municipal elections, she was elected to the Municipal Council of Prague 8 and subsequently to the Council of the City for Prague 8, responsible for social affairs, drug prevention and European funds. She also ran in the city-wide municipal elections, but was not elected.

In the 2013 parliamentary election, Pekarová Adamová was elected as a TOP 09 candidate from sixth place on the candidate list in Prague.

In the 2014 municipal elections, she defended the post of representative of the Municipal District of Prague 8 for TOP 09.

At the fourth National Assembly of TOP 09 in November 2015 in Prague, she was elected vice-president of the party.

In the 2017 Czech parliamentary election, Pekarová Adamová ran from the second place on the Prague candidate list for TOP 09, and defended her mandate. At the end of November 2017, she was elected first vice-president of TOP 09, defeating Lukáš Otys.

=== TOP 09 Leader and Speaker of the Chamber of Deputies ===
At the end of August 2019, Pekarová Adamová announced that she would run for the position of party chair at the TOP 09 autumn conference. On 24 November, Pekarová Adamová was elected president of TOP 09, defeating senator Tomáš Czernin.

Pekarová Adamová was reelected to the Chamber of Deputies in the 2021 Czech parliamentary election, which TOP 09 contested as part of the Spolu alliance. She stood as SPOLU's lead candidate in Prague, and won over 48,000 preferential votes, the second highest total in the election. SPOLU finished in first place and formed a coalition government. On 10 November 2021, Pekarová Adamová was elected President of the Chamber of Deputies for the new parliament with 102 votes.

On 20 November 2021, Pekarová Adamová was reelected in a TOP 09 leadership election as the only candidate, with 163 of 176 votes.

On 9 March 2023, Pekarová Adamová and Prime Minister Petr Fiala served for 14 hours as acting co-presidents, as the term of President Miloš Zeman had expired and new president Petr Pavel was yet to be sworn in. On 11 November, she was re-elected in a TOP 09 leadership election as the only candidate, with 142 of 177 votes.

In April 2023, for the first time in history, a motion to dismiss the Speaker of the Chamber of Deputies was debated. The opposition accused Pekarová Adamová of favoring the government camp in her conduct during a debate on pension valorization in which she limited speaking time. In the end, Pekarová Adamová was not dismissed, as the majority of voters opposed the dismissal.

On 18 February 2025, Pekarová Adamová announced on Twitter that she would not be standing in the 2025 Czech parliamentary election, citing health problems. She also offered to step down as leader of TOP 09, but the party board supported her to remain as leader until the end of her mandate in November. KSČM chairwoman Kateřina Konečná posted on social media: "Since when is conscience a health problem?", later apologizing for this statement. In September 2025, Pekarová stated that after the parliamentary elections, she planned to publish a book and start working in the commercial sector.

After leaving politics in 2025, Pekarová Adamová started working for KPMG.

== Political positions ==
On 23 May 2020, Pekarová Adamová supported a joint statement by Foreign Minister Tomáš Petříček, Culture Minister Lubomír Zaorálek and former Foreign Minister Karel Schwarzenberg condemning the planned Israeli annexation of Jerusalem. She said that "Israel is our ally and friend, and constructive criticism is appropriate in such relations". In December 2023, Pekarová Adamová and Miloš Vystrčil flew to Israel to express moral and political support for Israel in the Gaza war.

In June 2020, Pekarová Adamová expressed opposition to mandatory quotas for the redistribution of migrants within the European Union, arguing for the acceptance of refugees on a voluntary basis, and criticised the government of Andrej Babiš for "refusing to help our partners from the EU with the acceptance of even a few dozen orphans."

In November 2020, Pekarová Adamová welcomed Democrat Joe Biden's victory in the United States presidential election, declaring that the departure of Donald Trump would be the best news for the US. Ahead of the 2022 Hungarian parliamentary election, she expressed her wish for voters to reject Viktor Orbán. Her statement was criticized as unacceptable by her predecessor Radek Vondráček, MEP Jan Zahradil, and former Foreign Minister Tomáš Petříček, among others. Former President Václav Klaus called on the Chamber of Deputies to dismiss her from office.

In 2021, Pekarová Adamová publicly stated her support for legalising same-sex marriage, and was among a group of MPs in 2022 that proposed a legislative change to allow same-sex couples to marry.

Pekarová Adamová expressed opposition to a new law enacted by TOP 09 health minister Vlastimil Válek, under which free menstrual products will be provided in Czech schools from 2026. Pekarová Adamová stated on a podcast that she found the topic of period poverty irritating and that her solution would be to "enable people to make money for [menstrual products] themselves" rather than giving them out free. Daniel Hůle, head of the non-profit organization People in Need, commented on Pekarová Adamová's stance "Let us not give out toilet paper for free in elementary schools, but let the children earn it."

== Controversies and criticism ==
In January 2022, Markéta Pekarová Adamová promised that the Chamber of Deputies would save CZK 40 million in 2022. However, the Chamber of Deputies spent CZK 141 million more than the average costs for 2018 to 2021. Similarly, in 2023, the Chamber exceeded its budget by CZK 43 million. In 2023, Kverulant.org drew attention to the unfulfilled promise and called on Pekarová Adamová to apologize to the public for its failure to fulfill it, but the Chamber of Deputies responded with a threat of legal action if the article was not removed.

In addition to the functioning of the Chamber of Deputies, Kverulant focuses on financial compensation for individual deputies, which is paid by Czech taxpayers in accordance with the law. In the period from January to September 2024, Pekarová Adamová received the most compensation, totaling CZK 3,792,869 for nine individual trips. Pekarová Adamová's most expensive trip during this period was a trip to Armenia and Azerbaijan, which political commentator Thomas Kulidakis described as "embarrassing". In Armenia, Pekarová Adamová initially expressed her support for the Armenian people regarding Azerbaijan but later retracted her comments after being informed of Azerbaijan's expectations, stating that her words were "distorted and misunderstood," affirming that "Nagorno-Karabakh is an integral part of Azerbaijan," and condemning Armenia's actions and its supporters in the Parliamentary Assembly of the Council of Europe, as well as France's stance towards Azerbaijan.

In August 2022, Pekarová Adamová was met with backlash after suggesting that citizens should deal with high energy prices by putting on another sweater. The opposition criticized this statement, arguing that the situation should be addressed primarily by the government. Pekarová Adamová stated on several occasions that she did not regret this statement, including during an interview with journalist Linda Bartošová, who described Pekarová Adamová's media image as that of "a sachem who does not understand people's problems." In a 2025 interview, Pekarová Adamová complained that this statement had often been manipulated and taken out of context.

== Personal life ==
Pekarová Adamová is bilingual in Czech and English. She has been married to Slovak IT specialist Tomáš Pekára since 2016. Her religion is Roman Catholic.

After the 2025 election, Pekarová Adamová revealed that, after 10 years of trying to get pregnant, she was suffering from a herniated disc and chronic fatigue syndrome.

== Awards ==
- Grand Decoration of Honour in Gold with Star for services to the Republic of Austria (2024).
- Order of Brilliant Star with Special Grand Cordon – Taiwan-Republic of China (2026)

Party political offices
Preceded by Jiří Pospíšil	Leader of Top 09; 2019–2025	Succeeded by Matěj Ondřej Havel
Political offices
Preceded by Radek Vondráček	President of the Czech Chamber of Deputies; 2021–2025	Succeeded by Tomio Okamura
