= TOP 09 =

Czech political party

- Leader: Matěj Ondřej Havel
- Deputy Leaders: Jiří Pospíšil; Ondřej Müller; Kateřina Pastorková; Marek Ženíšek; Lukáš Otys
- Chamber of Deputies Leader: Jan Jakob
- MEP Leader: Luděk Niedermayer
- Founders: Miroslav Kalousek; Karel Schwarzenberg
- Founded: 11 June 2009; 17 years ago
- Split from: KDU–ČSL
- Headquarters: Opletalova 1603/57, Prague
- Think tank: TOPAZ
- Youth wing: TOP Team
- Membership (2026): 1,737
- Ideology: Liberal conservatism; Liberalism (Czech); Christian democracy; Pro-Europeanism
- Political position: Centre-right
- National affiliation: Spolu (2020–2026)
- European affiliation: European People's Party
- European Parliament group: European People's Party Group
- International affiliation: International Democracy Union
- Colours: (customary)
- Chamber of Deputies: 9 / 200
- Senate: 7 / 81
- European Parliament: 2 / 21
- Regional councils: 16 / 675
- Governors of the regions: 0 / 13
- Local councils: 326 / 61,677

Website
- top09.cz

TOP 09 (Czech: Tradice Odpovědnost Prosperita, lit. 'Tradition Responsibility Prosperity') is a liberal-conservative political party in the Czech Republic, led by Matěj Ondřej Havel. 9 of its members sit in the Chamber of Deputies, and two of them are MEPs.

== History ==
=== Foundation and participation in government ===
The party was founded on 11 June 2009 by Miroslav Kalousek who left the Christian and Democratic Union – Czechoslovak People's Party. Its first leader was Karel Schwarzenberg, who had previously served as Minister of Foreign Affairs in the second Topolánek cabinet from January 2007 to March 2009, having been nominated by the Green Party for the post, and who had been elected to the Senate in 2004 as nominee of the Freedom Union – Democratic Union (US-DEU) and Civic Democratic Alliance (ODA) parties.

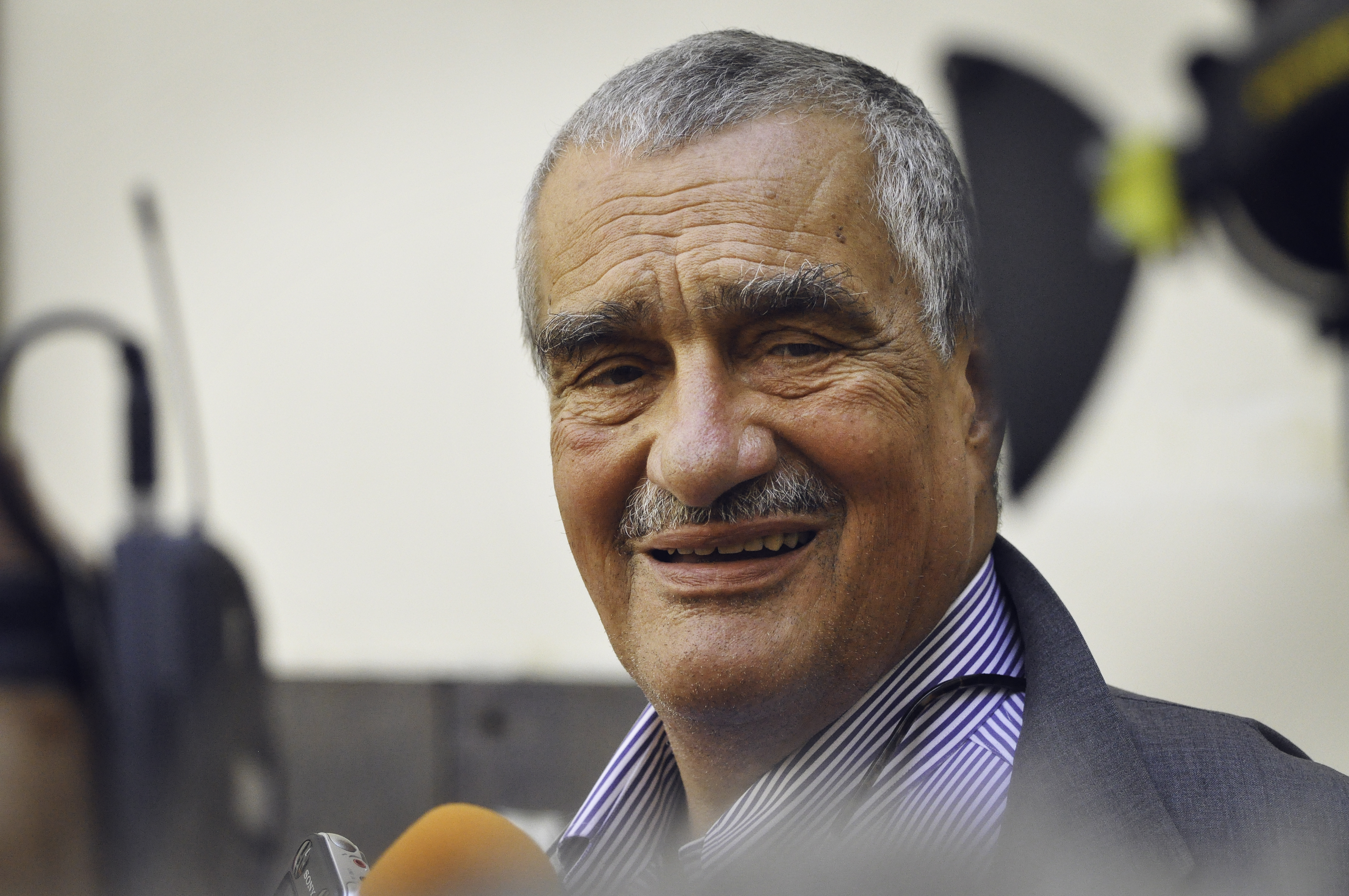
Karel Schwarzenberg, Honorary chairman and former leader of TOP 09

In the 2010 parliamentary elections on 28–29 May 2010, TOP 09 received 16.7% of the vote and 41 seats, becoming the third largest party. The party joined the Nečas cabinet, forming a coalition with the Civic Democratic Party (ODS) and Public Affairs (VV).

In September 2010 TOP 09 applied to join the European People's Party. Karel Schwarzenberg had already officially participated in two EPP summits (15 September and 16 December 2010). On 10 February 2011 TOP 09 was granted permission to join the EPP.

In the 2013 parliamentary election on 25–26 October 2013, TOP 09 won 12% of the vote and 26 seats. The party became part of the parliamentary opposition to the Sobotka cabinet.

=== Opposition and cooperation with STAN and ODS ===
In the 2014 European elections on 24 and 25 May 2014, TOP 09 reached second place nationally with 15.95% of the vote, electing 4 MEPs.

Karel Schwarzenberg left the position of leader in 2015. He was replaced by Miroslav Kalousek afterwards.

In March 2016, Karel Tureček left the party and joined ANO, which left TOP 09 with 25 MPs. In May 2016, Pavol Lukša, one of founders of TOP 09, left the party and established a new party, Good Choice.

The 2016 Czech regional elections were a major loss for TOP 09. The party gained only 19 seats and 3.4% of the vote. Miroslav Kalousek then considered resigning, but decided to remain the party’s leader.

In January 2017, TOP 09 introduced a new program called Vision 2030, in which it declared intentions to adopt the Euro, implement electronical voting, and increase health standards to Germany's level. TOP 09 also wanted to shorten the working week to 4 days. Miroslav Kalousek said he believed that TOP 09 would get over 10% in the upcoming legislative election even though recent opinion polls indicated that TOP 09 might not reach the 5% threshold.

Ahead of the 2017 parliamentary elections, TOP 09 was endorsed by The Czech Crown, Conservative Party, Club of Committed Non-Party Members and Liberal-Environmental Party. The party eventually received 5.3% of the vote, gaining 7 seats. Jiří Pospíšil became the new leader after the election.

In the next year municipal elections TOP 09 got only 1.1 per cent of the vote nationally. The best performance for the party was in the Prague City council elections, following which it joined a coalition with the Czech Pirate Party and Prague Together.

In November, 2019, Markéta Pekarová Adamová was elected party’s leader. In late 2020, TOP 09 formed an electoral alliance with KDU-ČSL and ODS called Spolu, to run in the 2021 elections. The alliance won the popular vote and formed a coalition with the Pirates and Mayors alliance. As a result of agreements made to form these alliances, TOP 09 leader Markéta Pekarová Adamová became President of the Chamber of Deputies of the Czech Republic.

On 20 November 2021, Pekarová Adamová was reelected in a TOP 09 leadership election, with 163 out of 176 votes, being the only candidate.

On 11 November 2023, Pekarová Adamová was reelected in a TOP 09 leadership election, with 142 out of 177 votes, being the only candidate.

On 8 November 2025, Matěj Ondřej Havel was elected in a TOP 09 leadership election, with 120 out of 171 votes, being the only candidate.

== Ideology ==
TOP 09 is characterised most prominently by its economic liberalism and its pro-Europeanism, being firmly in favour of European integration. Generally, the party is considered to lean towards both liberal and conservative strains of right-of-centre thought, gradually becoming increasingly liberal compared to its official stance of conservatism.

== Election results ==
=== Chamber of Deputies ===
Election	Leader	Votes	%	Seats	+/−	Place	Position
2010	Karel Schwarzenberg (Note: With participation of STAN and SLK candidates on the party list.)	873,833	16.7	41 / 200		3rd	Coalition
2013	Karel Schwarzenberg (Note: With participation of STAN and SLK candidates on the party list.)	596,357	12.0	26 / 200	▼15	4th ▼	Opposition
2017	Miroslav Kalousek (Note: With participation of KČ, KONS, KAN and LES candidates on the party list.)	268,811	5.3	7 / 200	▼19	8th ▼	Opposition
2021	Markéta Pekarová Adamová	1,493,701	27.79	14 / 200	▲7	1st ▲	Coalition
2021	Part of SPOLU coalition, which won 71 seats in total						
2025	Markéta Pekarová Adamová	1,313,346	23.36	9 / 200	▼5	2nd ▼	Opposition
2025	Part of SPOLU coalition, which won 52 seats in total						

=== Senate ===
Election	First round			Second round			Seats	Total seats	+/–
Election	Votes	%	Place	Votes	%	Place	Seats	Total seats	+/–
2010	165,277	14.40	3rd	51,310	7.54	3rd	2 / 27	2 / 81	New
2012	57,907	6.59	5th	9,918	1.93	5th	2 / 27	4 / 81	▲2
2014	92,137	8.98	5th	30,476	6.43	6th	0 / 27	4 / 81	Steady
2016	70,653	8.02	6th	30,820	7.27	5th	2 / 27	4 / 81	Steady
2018	41,980	3.85	7th	22,580	5.40	8th	1 / 27	3 / 81	▼1
2020	46,575	4.67	7th	33,938	7.51	4th	2 / 27	5 / 81	▲2
2022	73,473	6.60	6th	33,341	6.95	4th	3 / 27	6 / 81	▲1
2024	44,320	5.59	5th	17,457	4.47	4th	2 / 27	7 / 81	▲1
2026	51,686	4.48	6th	12,422	2.62	7th	2 / 27	7 / 81	Steady

=== Presidential ===
Election	Candidate	First round			Second round		
Election	Candidate	Votes	%	Result	Votes	%	Result
2013	Karel Schwarzenberg	1,204,195	23.40	Runner-up	2,241,171	45.20	Lost
2018	Jiří Drahoš	1,369,601	26.60	Runner-up	2,701,206	48.63	Lost
2023 (Note: The SPOLU coalition supported 3 independent candidates for this election.)	Petr Pavel	1,975,056	35.40	Winner	3,358,926	58.33	Won
2023	Danuše Nerudová	777,080	13.93	Eliminated	supported Petr Pavel		
2023	Pavel Fischer	376,705	6.75	Eliminated	supported Petr Pavel		

=== European Parliament ===
Election	List leader	Votes	%	Seats	+/–	EP Group
2014 (Note: Run in a joint list with STAN.)	Luděk Niedermayer	241,747	15.95 (#2)	3 / 21	New	EPP
2019 (Note: Run in a joint list with STAN, SZ and LES.)	Jiří Pospíšil	276,220	11.65 (#4)	2 / 21	▼1	EPP
2024 (Note: Run as part of the SPOLU coalition.)	Alexandr Vondra	661,250	22.27 (#2)	2 / 21	Steady	EPP

=== Regional councils ===
Election	Vote	%	Seats	+/–	Position
2012	175,089	6.6	19 / 675		5th
2016	86,164	3.4	19 / 675	Steady	9th
2020 (Note: Including one member elected as a nominee of Mayors and Independents.)	Party didn't run on a single list		20 / 675	▲1	9th
2024	Party didn't run on a single list		16 / 675	▼ -4	8th

=== Local elections ===
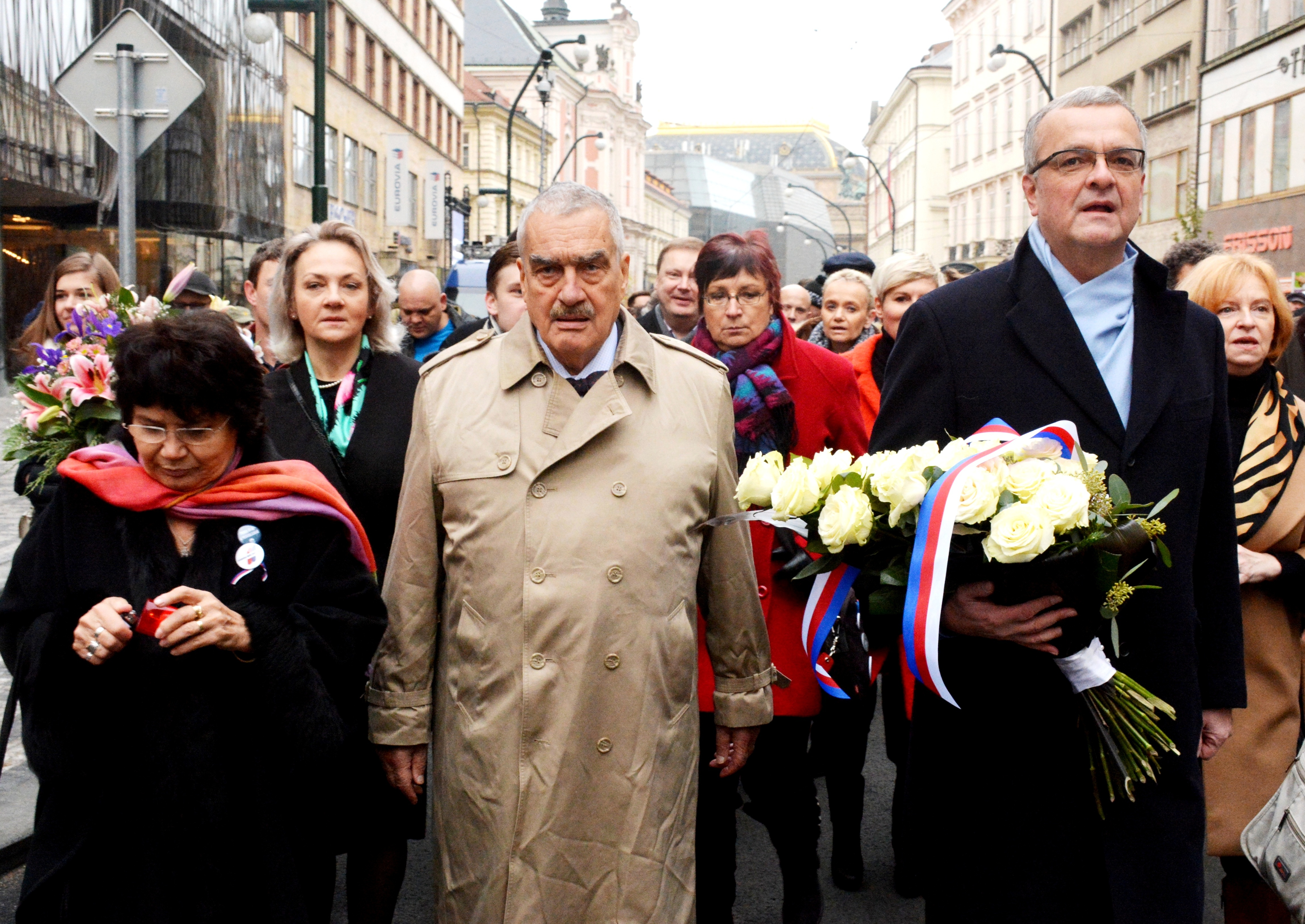
Former TOP09 leaders Karel von Schwarzenberg and Miroslav Kalousek

Election	Votes	%	Seats
2010	8,537,461	9.5	1,509 / 62,178
2014	8,324,195	8.4	726 / 62,300
2018	5,384,261	4.8	483 / 61,892
2022	4,927,025	4.6	428 / 61,780
2026	4,173,903	3,8	326 / 61,780

=== Prague City Assembly ===
Election	Leader	Votes	%	Seats	+/–	Position	Status
2010	Zdeněk Tůma	1,043,008	30.2	26 / 65	▲25	▲1st	Coalition (2010–2013)
2010	Zdeněk Tůma	1,043,008	30.2	26 / 65	▲25	▲1st	Minority (2013–2014)
2014	Tomáš Hudeček	4,158,226	20.1	16 / 65	▼10	▼2nd	Opposition
2018	Jiří Pospíšil	4,127,063	16.3	13 / 65	▼3	▼4th	Coalition

== Leaders ==
- Karel Schwarzenberg (2009–2015)
- Miroslav Kalousek (2015–2017)
- Jiří Pospíšil (2017–2019)
- Markéta Pekarová Adamová (2019–2025)
- Matěj Ondřej Havel (Since 2025)

== Symbols ==
Party logo 2009–2017

Party logo 2017–2021

Party logo 2021–present
