= Czech Fiscal Council =

Government oversight organization

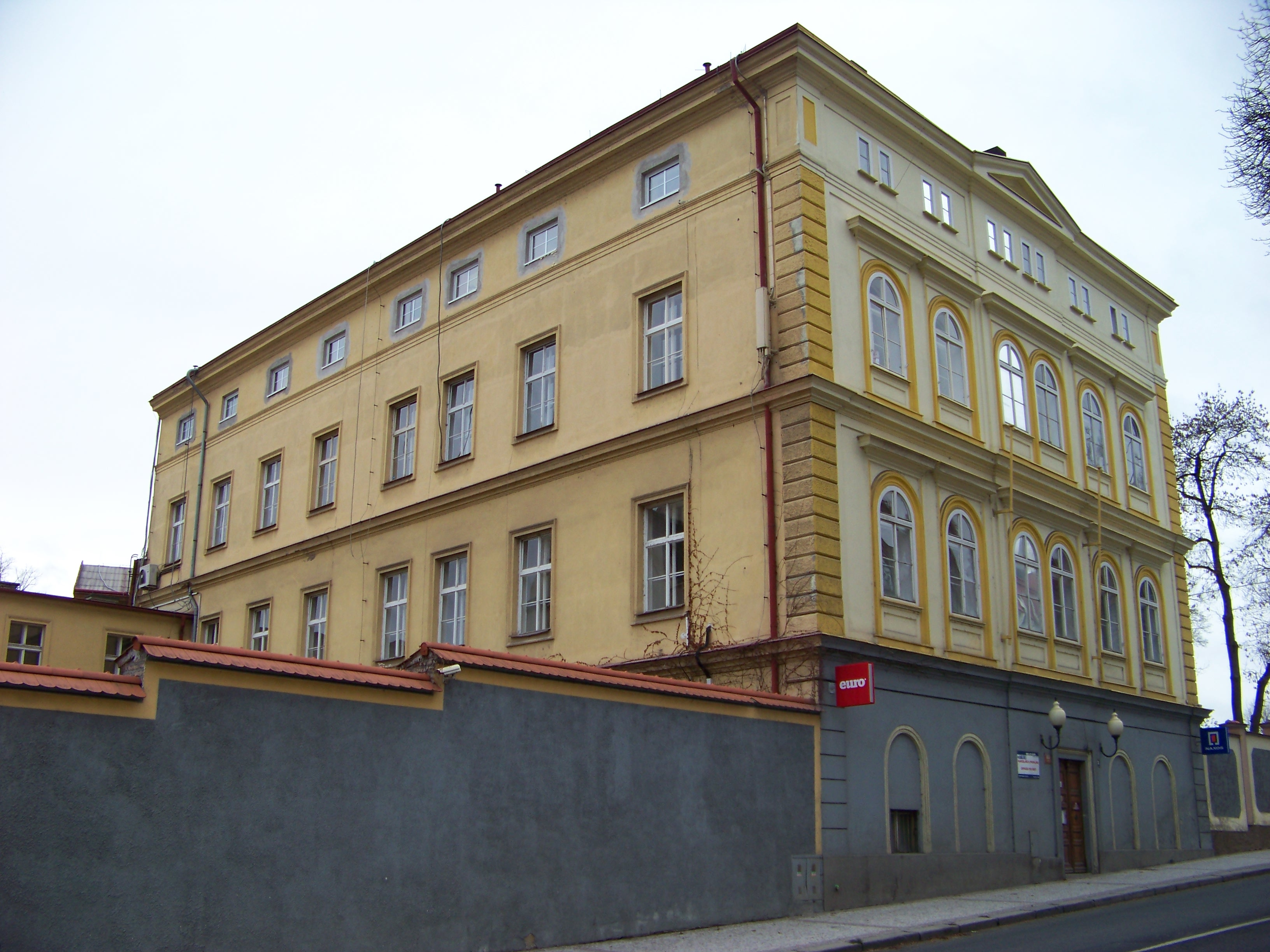
- Formation: January 25, 2018
- Headquarters: Holečkova 103/31, Prague, 150 00, Czech Republic
- Website: https://www.rozpoctovarada.cz/en/

Czech Fiscal Council is an independent expert body whose main task is to assess whether the state and other public institutions comply with the rules of budgetary responsibility laid down in Act No. 23/2017 Coll.:: The Czech Fiscal Council has three members. From 2018 to 2022, it was chaired by Czech economist Eva Zamrazilová. Tasks related to the professional, organizational, administrative, personnel, and technical support of the Council's activities are performed by the Office of the Czech Fiscal Council in accordance with the law.

== The tasks of the Czech Fiscal Council ==
The tasks of the Czech Fiscal Council are laid down in Act No. 23/2017 Coll. on the rules of budgetary responsibility. These include, in particular:

- evaluating compliance with numerical fiscal rules (such as the debt limit rule) and submitting reports on compliance with these rules to the Chamber of Deputies,
- determining the amount of debt and announcing it in the same manner as laws are announced,
- preparing and submitting to the Chamber of Deputies a report on the long-term sustainability of public finances,
- monitoring the development of the public sector's financial management,
- preparing an opinion on the calculation of the corrective component used to adjust the deviation of the actual result of the public sector's financial management from the expected result.

The Czech Fiscal Council is a member of the network of independent fiscal institutions in the European Union.

== Members of the Czech Fiscal Council ==
The Czech Fiscal Council has three members by law. The chair is elected by the Chamber of Deputies of the Parliament of the Czech Republic on the proposal of the Government of the Czech Republic, and the other two members are also elected by the Chamber of Deputies of the Parliament of the Czech Republic, one on the proposal of the Senate of the Parliament of the Czech Republic and one on the proposal of the Czech National Bank.

The current members of the Czech Fiscal Council are

- Mojmír Hampl(chairman of the Czech Fiscal Council, in office since July 1, 2022, member of the Czech Fiscal Council nominated by the Senate, in office since January 14, 2022, term of office six years),
- Jan Pavel (member of the Czech Fiscal Council nominated by the Czech National Bank, in office since January 23, 2020, term of office six years, previously in office from January 17, 2018 to January 17, 2020). He also lectures as a full-time Professor of Economics at the Prague University of Economics and Business
- Petr Musil (member of the Czech Fiscal Council nominated by the Senate, in office since 25th Nov 2022)

Former members of the Czech Fiscal Council are

- Eva Zamrazilová (Chairwoman of the Czech Fiscal Council, in office from January 5, 2018, to June 30, 2022, term of office six years),
- Richard Hindls (member of the Czech Fiscal Council nominated by the Senate, in office from December 29, 2017 to December 29, 2021, term of office four years)
