= Tomáš Cahlík =

Czech economist and econometrician

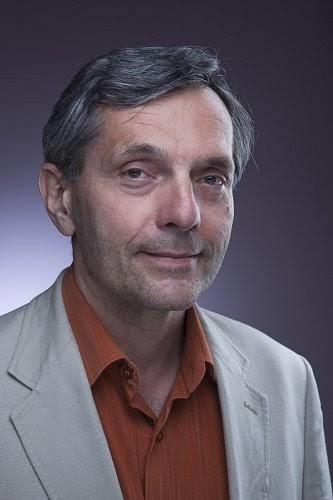
- Born: 26 November 1956 (age 69); Vsetín, Czechoslovakia

Academic background
- Education: 1975–1979 — Mathematical Methods in Economics, University of Economics, Prague; 1979–1983 — Doctoral studies, University of Economics, Prague

Academic work
- Discipline: Macroeconomics, Econometrics
- Institutions: Charles University, Faculty of Social Sciences

Tomáš Cahlík (born 26 November 1956) is a Czech economist and econometrician. He is affiliated with the Institute of Economic Studies (IES), Faculty of Social Sciences, Charles University in Prague.

== Career ==
He specializes in macroeconomics, econometrics, economic growth and development, comparative economics, and computational approaches in economics, including network and agent-based modelling.

He studied mathematical methods in economics at the University of Economics in Prague from 1975 to 1979 and completed his doctoral studies there between 1979 and 1983.

Cahlík has held academic positions in several institutions. Between 1980 and 1985, he taught operations research and econometrics at the University of Economics in Prague.

From 1984 to 1993, he worked at the Czechoslovak Academy of Sciences (ČSAV), focusing on information systems. In 1991–1992, he worked at the École des Mines de Paris in scientometrics and information science.

Since 1994, he has been teaching at the Institute of Economic Studies, Charles University, where he lectures on macroeconomics, comparative economics, and economic development. He has also taught at the Center for International Educational Exchange (2000–2012), Bentley University (2008–2009), Anglo-American University in Prague (2009–2011), and the University of Economics in Prague (2012–2018), where he lectured on econometrics.

His research interests include macroeconomic modelling, economic convergence, scientometrics, and network approaches in economics.
