= Aleš Michl =

Governor of the Czech National Bank

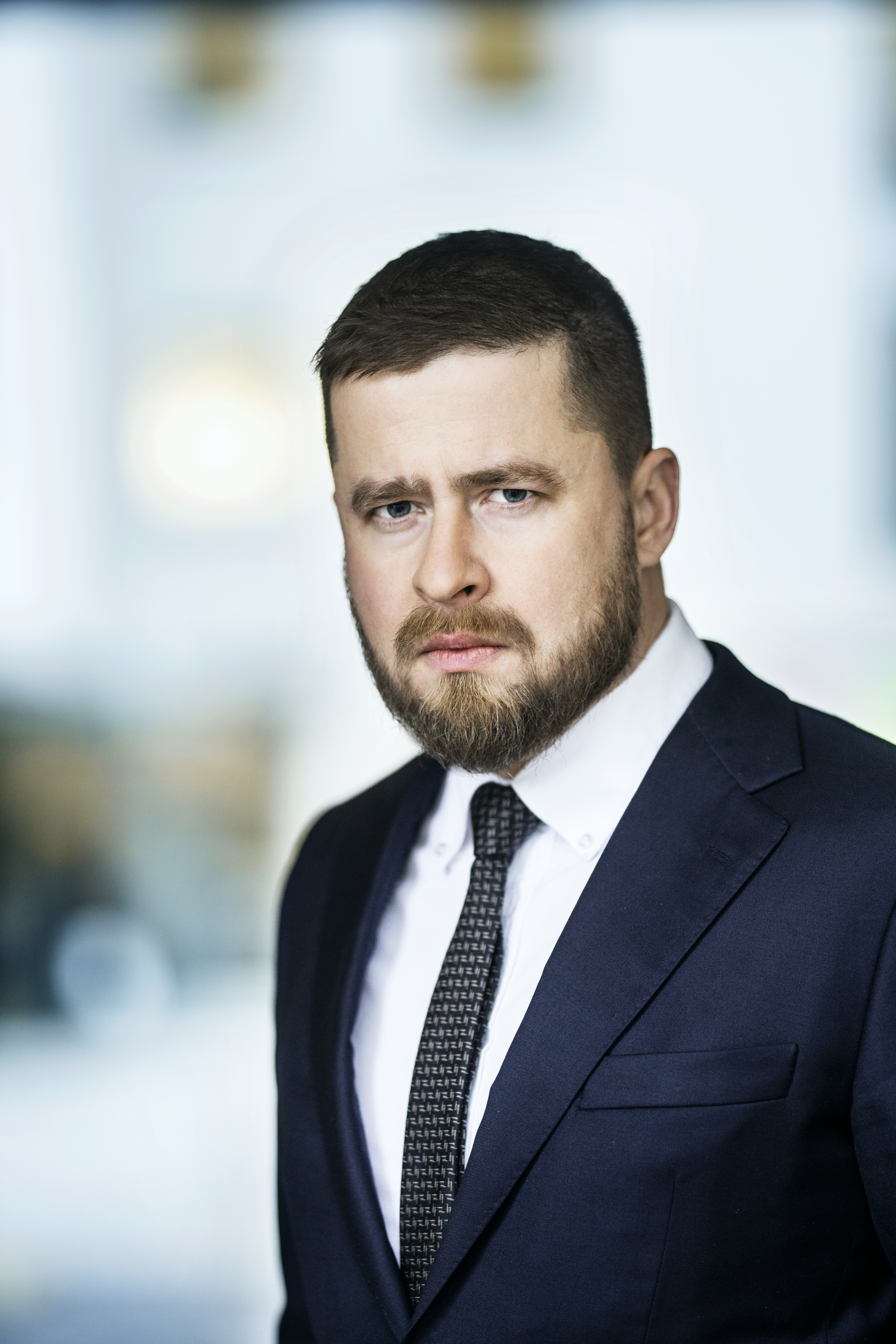
- Aleš Michl in 2019

Governor of the Czech National Bank
- Incumbent
- Assumed office 1 July 2022
- Vice Governor: Eva Zamrazilová; Jan Frait
- Preceded by: Jiří Rusnok

Member of the Bank Board of the Czech National Bank
- Incumbent
- Assumed office 1 December 2018

Personal details
- Born: 18 October 1977 (age 49) Prague, Czechoslovakia
- Education: University of Economics in Prague
- Awards: Governor of the Year, Central Banking Awards (2025); Central Banker of the Year: Europe, The Banker (2025); Central Banker Report Cards: A-, Global Finance (2025)

Aleš Michl (born 18 October 1977) is a Czech economist and the fifth Governor of the Czech National Bank. He has been a member of the Czech National Bank's Board since 1 December 2018, and was appointed Governor by the President of the Czech Republic, effective from 1 July 2022, for a six-year term.

Michl is a former commercial bank investment strategist and co-founder of an algorithmic asset-management fund. He is the author of academic and popular articles and books on economics and the popularisation of mathematics. He holds a PhD in finance.

In January 2025, he received an award from The Banker magazine in the category of best governor of the year in Europe and in March 2025 he was awarded Governor of the Year at the Central Banking Awards 2025.

== Education ==
Michl earned his Ph.D. in finance from the Prague University of Economics and Business (VŠE) in 2020, having graduated with a master's degree from the same institution in 2002.

Michl is an admirer of Alois Rašín, a key figure in the establishment of Czechoslovakia's economic policy and independent currency, and the first Czechoslovak Minister of Finance. He considers himself a monetarist and is an admirer of Milton Friedman's work.

== Career ==
Michl worked as an economic and investment strategist at Raiffeisenbank from 2006 to 2015. He co-founded an algorithmic asset-management fund specialising in US stocks and the Czech money market. He later sold his share in the fund and ceased all investment activities due to his position at the Czech National Bank. Additionally, from 2014 to 2018, he served as an external economic advisor to the Czech Ministry of Finance, focusing on macroeconomic analysis and government debt stabilisation. He has been a member of the Czech National Bank's Board since 1 December 2018.

== Governor ==
Michl was appointed Governor of the Czech National Bank (CNB) by the President of the Czech Republic, Miloš Zeman, effective from 1 July 2022, for a six-year term. Since assuming the role of governor, he has navigated the institution through a period of significant economic challenges. When Michl took office, inflation in the Czech Republic stood at a staggering 17.5%, peaking at 18% a few months later - the highest rate since the transition to a market economy in the 1990s. Additionally, the bank was dealing with the largest loss in its history, prompting the need for rationalisation and cost-cutting measures.

In his speech upon being appointed Governor in mid-2022, Michl pledged to bring inflation under control within two years. He emphasised the need to maintain higher interest rates than those seen in the past decade, advocating for an economy driven by savings rather than debt. Under his leadership, the bank's strategy in combating inflation expanded to include a strong koruna policy, which reduced the cost of importing expensive raw materials at the time, and, in turn, helped lower inflation. By spring 2023, the CNB had achieved the strictest monetary conditions in two decades, with the koruna reaching its strongest level in history. In February and March 2024, the CNB successfully reduced year-on-year inflation to the target of 2%, a level not seen since December 2018. This marked the restoration of price stability, fulfilling the bank's legal mandate. Michl has emerged as one of the first central bankers in Europe to deliver on this goal.

Under Michl's leadership, the CNB began purchasing gold and increasing the share of equities in its foreign exchange reserves. The goal of these actions is to enhance the expected return on the bank's assets so that, in the future, these returns will exceed the expected costs of liabilities, thereby enabling the bank to recover from its financial losses.

Additionally, under his leadership, the CNB reduced its workforce in 2023 for the first time in ten years, as Michl inherited an institution facing record operational expenditure growth. In response, a comprehensive rationalisation effort was undertaken in 2023, which included reducing the top management team from seventeen to fourteen directors and decreasing the total number of positions by 5.1% - the first such large-scale reduction in a decade.

For the first time in its history, the bank commissioned an external review of its monetary policy, the results were published in November 2024.

In January 2025, during a meeting of the bank's board, he commissioned an analysis to assess the feasibility of investing foreign exchange reserves into additional asset classes. The analysis will also explore the possibility of establishing a small test portfolio in Bitcoin. Michl became the first governor of a central bank from a developed country to publicly discuss the potential of investing the bank's reserves in Bitcoin. He emphasised that the idea remains in the stage of analysis and discussion. According to him, Bitcoin's value exhibits significant volatility, which complicates the use of its currently low correlation with other assets. Michl believes that the value of this cryptocurrency could reach either extreme in the future—zero or a significant high. In response, European Central Bank President Christine Lagarde expressed her opposition to the idea of purchasing Bitcoin for reserves. In November 2025, the bank announced the pruchase of $1 million in bitcoins and other blockchain-based digital assets, stating it will evaluate the investment in two to three years. The purchase was made outside the bank's existing international reserves. The bank made the purchases on October 30. At the time, the spot price of bitcoin was $110,670. The CNB also launched an innovation hub tasked with overseeing the testing of technologies such as blockchain, artificial intelligence, and instant payments.

During his term, instant payments were introduced for all residents of Czechia. The adoption of instant payments in the Czech public sector expanded significantly in November 2025, when the Czech National Bank enabled this feature for covering tax, social security, or health insurance collections.

In Global Finance magazine's 2025 and 2026 Central Banker Report Cards, he received an 'A-' rating, placing him among the three highest-rated governors in the European Union for both years. For the first time in its history, the CNB has issued its bonds in tokenised form using distributed ledger technology.

== Publications ==
=== Key speeches ===
- The Road to the Target I (Speech at the University of Economics and Business in Prague, Discussion on Inflation: The Road to the Target)
- The Road to the Target II (Speech at the Assembly of Members of the Czech Banking Association)
- Aleš Michl: The Current Level of Inflation Still Makes it Impossible to Lower Interest Rates (Speech delivered during the Discussion of the Financial Market Supervision Report for 2022 in the Senate of the Czech Republic)
- The Road to the Target III (Speech at the Tomas Bata University in Zlín, Discussion on Inflation: The Road to the Target)
- The Target (The Governor's speech at the CNB Discussion Forum in Pardubice)
- Taming Inflation from 18 to 2% and Paving the Way for ESG Financing (Governor Aleš Michl's Address to the Central Banking Summer Meetings Conference in London)
- The CNB’s first DLT bond and the new physics of the digital koruna (Speech at CzechCrunch Money Maker, Prague)
- AI forecasts GDP as well as economists. (University of Kyoto)

=== Books ===
- MICHLiq - průvodce ekonomií a investicemi (A Guide to Economics and Investment), 2014
- Jestřábi a holubice (Hawks and Doves), 2019
- Reset ekonomiky (How to Reset the Economy), 2021
- Matematické hádanky guvernéra ČNB (The CNB Governor's Mathematical Puzzles), 2024

=== Academic research ===
- Instant Payments in Czechia: Adoption and Future Trends, Ivan Trubelík, Tomáš Karhánek, Simona Malovaná, Aleš Michl
- The Rushin Index: A Weekly Indicator of Czech Economic Activity, Tomáš Adam, Ondřej Michálek, Aleš Michl, Eva Slezáková
- Balancing Volatility and Returns in the Czech National Bank's Foreign Exchange Portfolio, Tomáš Adam, Aleš Michl, Michal Škoda
- Money and Inflation: Lost Cointegration, Aleš Michl
- Ten Years Later: Lessons for DSGE Builders and Czech Policy Makers, Aleš Michl
- New Euro Convergence Criteria, Aleš Michl

Government offices
Preceded by Jiří Rusnok	Governor of the Czech National Bank; 2022–present	Incumbent
