= Damir Špoljarič =

Czech entrepreneur

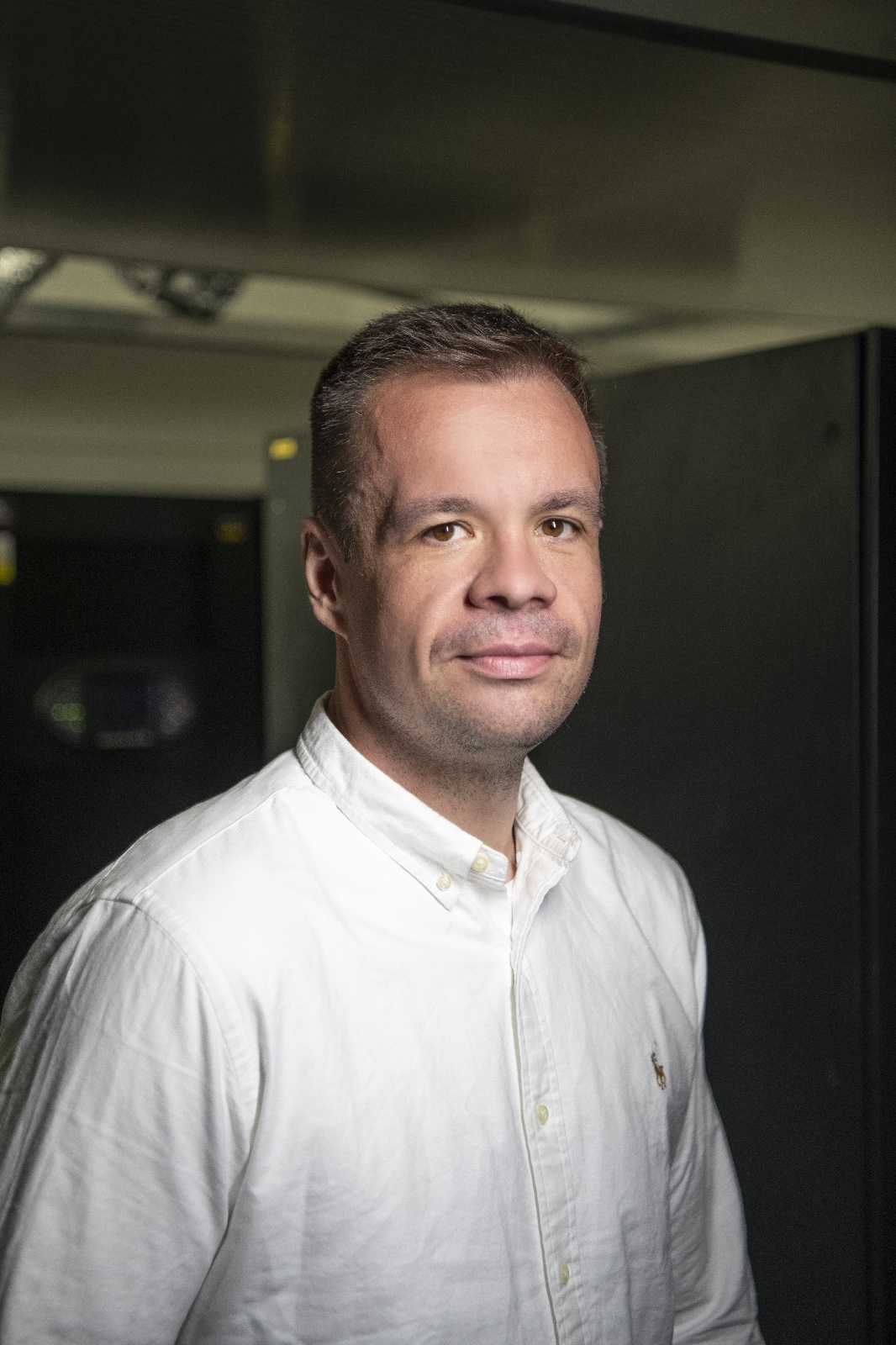
- Born: 21 May 1988 (age 37)

Damir Špoljarič (born 21 May 1988) is a Czech entrepreneur specializing in technology, real estate and aviation investments. He is also a professional pilot.

== Early life and education ==
Špoljarič was born on 21 May 1988. He studied at the Industrial Secondary School of Electrical Engineering in V Úžlabině, majoring in information technology, and continued his studies (which he did not complete) at the University of Economics in Prague and a university focusing on psychology.

== Career ==
In 2006, he founded the company VSHosting, which by 2009 had become a large company in the fields of internet project management and data center operations. The company is currently part of the Contabo Group, which is part of the KKR portfolio. Damir Špoljarič is both the CEO of and an investor in the VSHosting group.

In 2022, Špoljarič established Gi21 Capital, through which he has invested in other successful projects such as Rohlik, Keboola, and ArtMaster.
