= Miroslav Singer =

Doctor Miroslav Singer
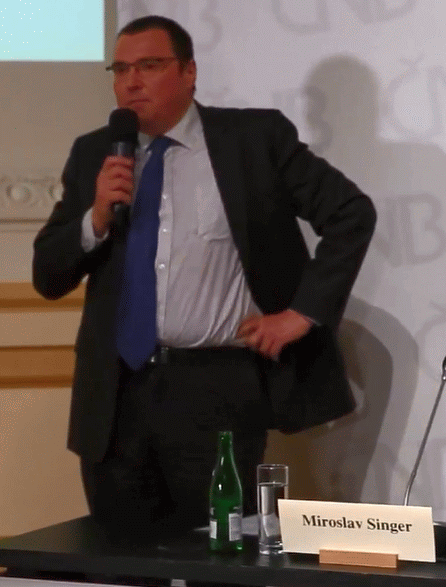
- Singer (2016)

Governor of the Czech National Bank
- In office 1 July 2010 – 1 July 2016
- Vice Governor: Mojmír Hampl; Vladimír Tomšík
- Preceded by: Zdeněk Tůma
- Succeeded by: Jiří Rusnok

Vice Governor of the Czech National Bank
- In office 13 February 2005 – 30 June 2010

Personal details
- Born: 14 May 1968 (age 58) Prague, Czech Republic
- Education: University of Pittsburgh

Miroslav Singer (born 14 May 1968, Prague) is a Czech economist who served as the third governor of the Czech National Bank from 2010 to 2016. He received his PhD in economics from the University of Pittsburgh in 1995.

== See also ==
- Czech National Bank
