= 2003 Czech Social Democratic Party leadership election =

2003 ČSSD leadership election
- 30 March 2003
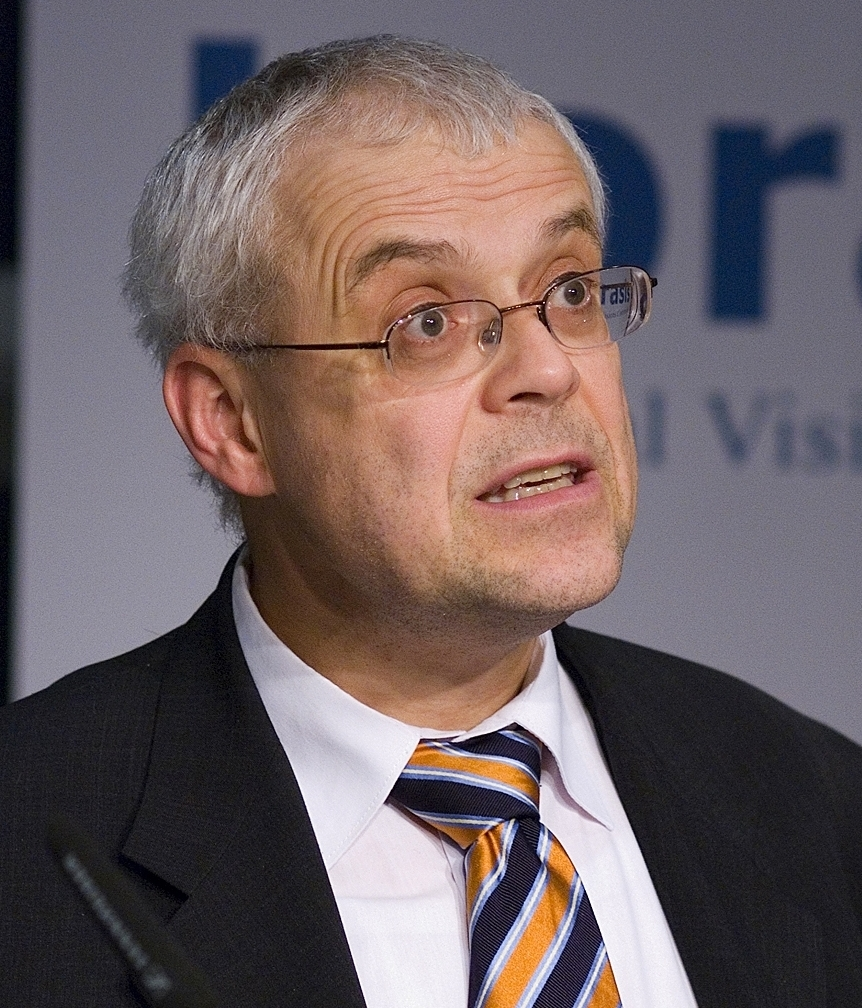

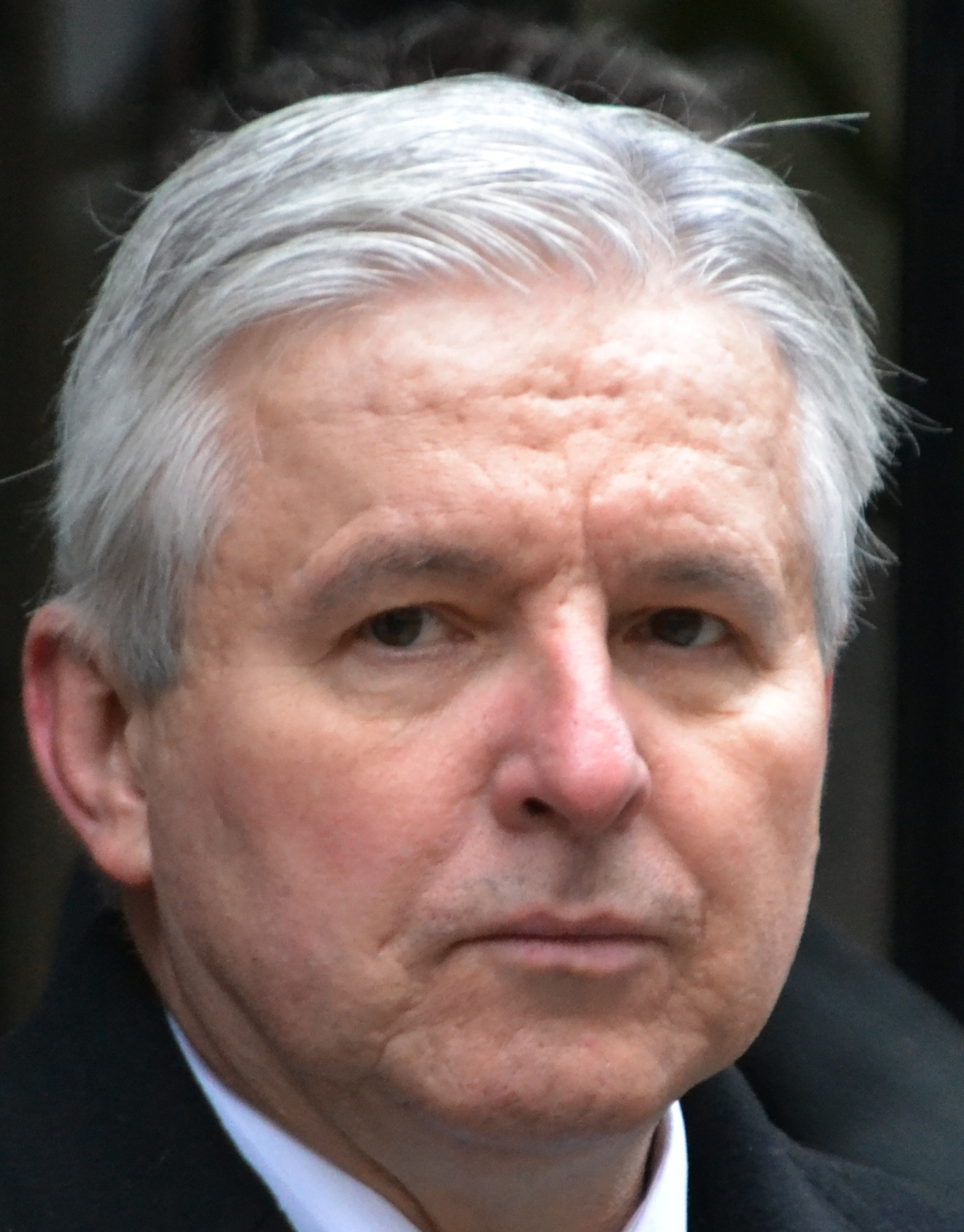
Candidate	Vladimír Špidla	Jiří Rusnok
Electoral vote	299	147
Percentage	67.04%	32.96%
Leader of ČSSD before election
Vladimír Špidla
Elected Leader of ČSSD
Vladimír Špidla

The Czech Social Democratic Party (ČSSD) leadership election of 2003 was held on 30 March 2003. The incumbent leader Vladimír Špidla was re-elected.

His rivals were Jiří Rusnok, Jana Volfová and Josef Dobrý. Volfová and Dobrý withdrew from election before the voting started and endorsed Rusnok.

== Candidates ==
- Vladimír Špidla, the incumbent leader of ČSSD and the Prime Minister of the Czech Republic
- Jiří Rusnok, former Minister of Finance

=== Declined ===
- Stanislav Gross – Gross was rumoured to be a candidate. Some organisations proclaimed their support for his possible candidacy. He himself said that he would run for the position in 2006.

== Results ==
Candidate	Vote	%
Vladimír Špidla	299	67.04
Jiří Rusnok	147	32.96
Total	446	100
