= Jiří Rusnok =

Czech politician and economist

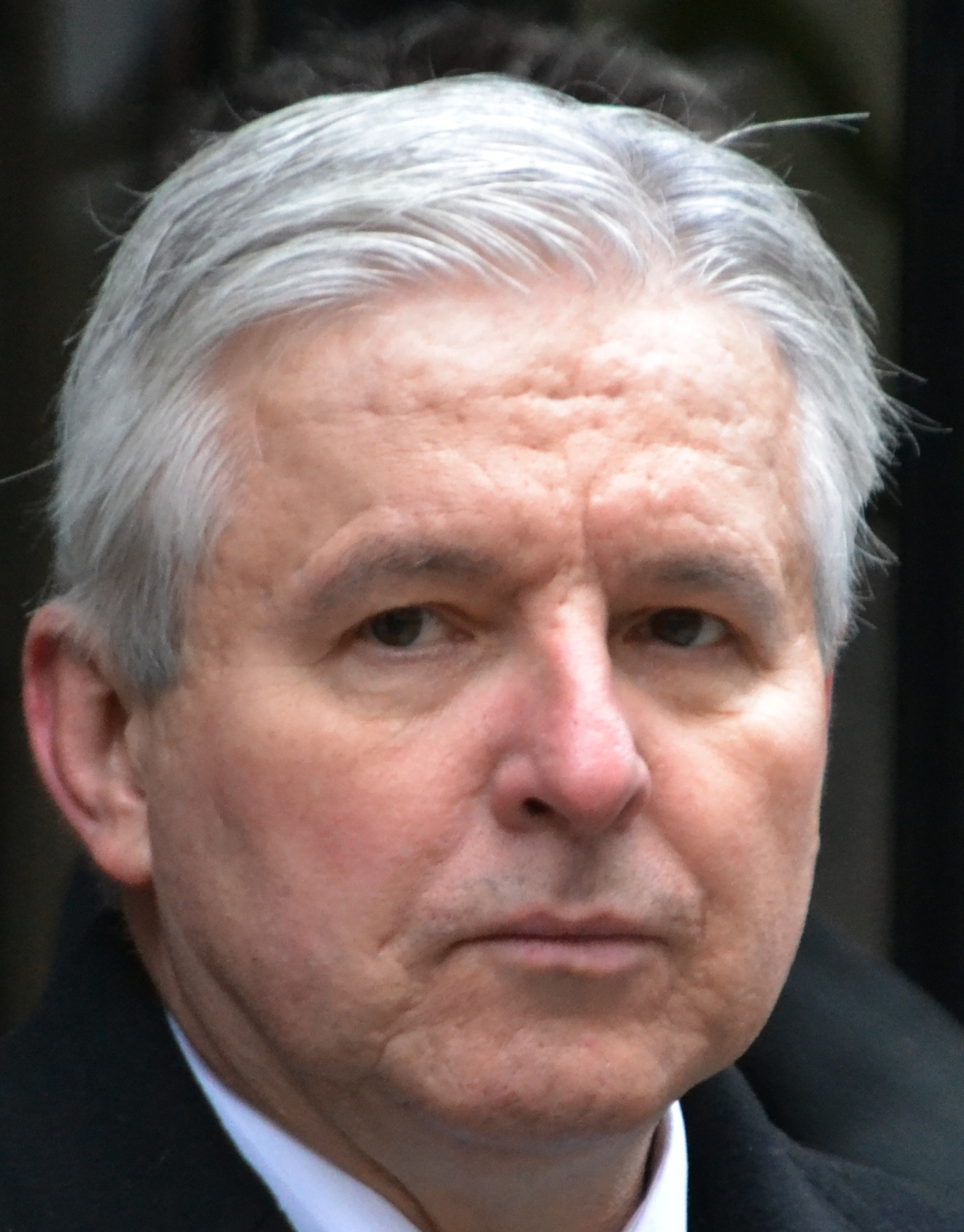
- Rusnok in 2013

Prime Minister of the Czech Republic
- In office 25 June 2013 – 17 January 2014
- President: Miloš Zeman
- Deputy: Jan Fischer; Martin Pecina
- Preceded by: Petr Nečas
- Succeeded by: Bohuslav Sobotka

Governor of the Czech National Bank
- In office 1 July 2016 – 30 June 2022
- Appointed by: Miloš Zeman
- Vice Governor: Mojmír Hampl; Vladimír Tomšík
- Preceded by: Miroslav Singer
- Succeeded by: Aleš Michl

Minister of Industry and Trade
- In office 15 July 2002 – 19 March 2003
- Prime Minister: Vladimír Špidla
- Preceded by: Miroslav Grégr
- Succeeded by: Milan Urban

Minister of Finance
- In office 13 April 2001 – 15 July 2002
- Prime Minister: Miloš Zeman
- Preceded by: Pavel Mertlík
- Succeeded by: Bohuslav Sobotka

Personal details
- Born: 16 October 1960 (age 66) Ostrava, Czechoslovakia
- Party: Social Democratic Party (1998–2010); Independent (2010–present)
- Education: University of Economics, Prague

Jiří Rusnok (born 16 October 1960) is a Czech politician and economist who served as the prime minister of the Czech Republic between June 2013 and January 2014. From 2016 to 2022 he served as the governor of the Czech National Bank.

Previously, Rusnok served in the government of the Czech Republic as minister of Finance from 2001 to 2002 and as minister of Industry and Trade from 2002 to 2003. On 25 June 2013, he was appointed as the prime minister by President Miloš Zeman. Rusnok replaced Petr Nečas, who resigned over a corruption and spying affair.

On 25 May 2016, President Miloš Zeman appointed Rusnok as fourth governor of the Czech National Bank, succeeding Miroslav Singer. Rusnok took office on 1 July 2016. His second term ended on 30 June 2022, and from 1 July 2022 he was replaced by Aleš Michl.

== Early life ==
Rusnok was born in Ostrava-Vítkovice. He studied at the University of Economics in Prague, graduating in 1984.

== Career ==
Rusnok worked for Státní plánovací komise (State Planning Commission) and Federální ministerstvo pro strategické plánování (Federal Ministry for Strategic Planning). Before the so-called Velvet Revolution, he was a candidate for membership in the Communist Party of Czechoslovakia.

In the 1990s, Rusnok worked as director of a department of the Czech-Moravian Confederation of Trade Unions (1992–1998). He joined politics in 1998 as a member of the Czech Social Democratic Party (ČSSD). Prime Minister Miloš Zeman appointed Rusnok to his cabinet as Finance Minister in June 2001. He continued as Minister of Industry and Trade in the cabinet of Vladimír Špidla; however, he resigned his post and parliamentary mandate and left politics in March 2003, after disagreements with Špidla. After that, he worked in the private sector.

=== Prime minister ===
President Miloš Zeman appointed Rusnok as Prime Minister of a caretaker government in June 2013 in a move that was criticized by political parties in the Czech Republic. It was called irresponsible by the parties of the former coalition government (ODS and TOP 09), while the opposition (ČSSD) called for early elections.

On 7 August 2013, Chamber of Deputies denied support to the caretaker government of Rusnok. His cabinet got support of 93 legislators, compared to 100 against, while seven legislators abstained. A majority of voting legislators was required. Following the vote, TOP 09 stated that due to a lack of support for a potential renewed ODS-TOP 09-LIDEM government, they would instead support an early election. The ČSSD and KSČM also supported an early election. In reaction, Rusnok signaled his intention to resign the next day: "I think this result is positive, as far as further political development in our country is concerned. It will lead to the dissolution of the parliament."

=== Governor of the Czech National Bank ===
In 2014, Zeman appointed Rusnok to the seven-member board of the Czech National Bank, replacing Eva Zamrazilová. In 2016, he succeeded Miroslav Singer as the bank's governor, again following an appointment by Zeman. In 2022, Zeman appointed Aleš Michl as Rusnok's successor.

== Other activities ==
- European Systemic Risk Board (ESRB), Ex-Officio Member
- International Monetary Fund (IMF), Ex-Officio Alternate Member of the Board of Governors (since 2016)

== Political position ==
Rusnok supports moving the Czech Republic closer to adopting the euro. In 2014, he also backed the central bank’s policy of weakening the Czech koruna to fight deflation risks and help an economy recovering from a record-long recession.

== See also ==
- Jiří Rusnok's Cabinet

Political offices
Preceded by Pavel Mertlík	Minister of Finance; 2001–2002	Succeeded by Bohuslav Sobotka
Preceded by Miroslav Grégr	Minister of Industry and Trade; 2002–2003	Succeeded by Milan Urban
Preceded by Petr Nečas	Prime Minister of the Czech Republic; 2013–2014	Succeeded by Bohuslav Sobotka
Government offices
Preceded by Miroslav Singer	Governor of the Czech National Bank; 2016–2022	Succeeded by Aleš Michl
