= Faculty of Informatics and Statistics, University of Economics in Prague =

Faculty of Informatics and Statistics
- Fakulta informatiky a statistiky Vysoké školy ekonomické
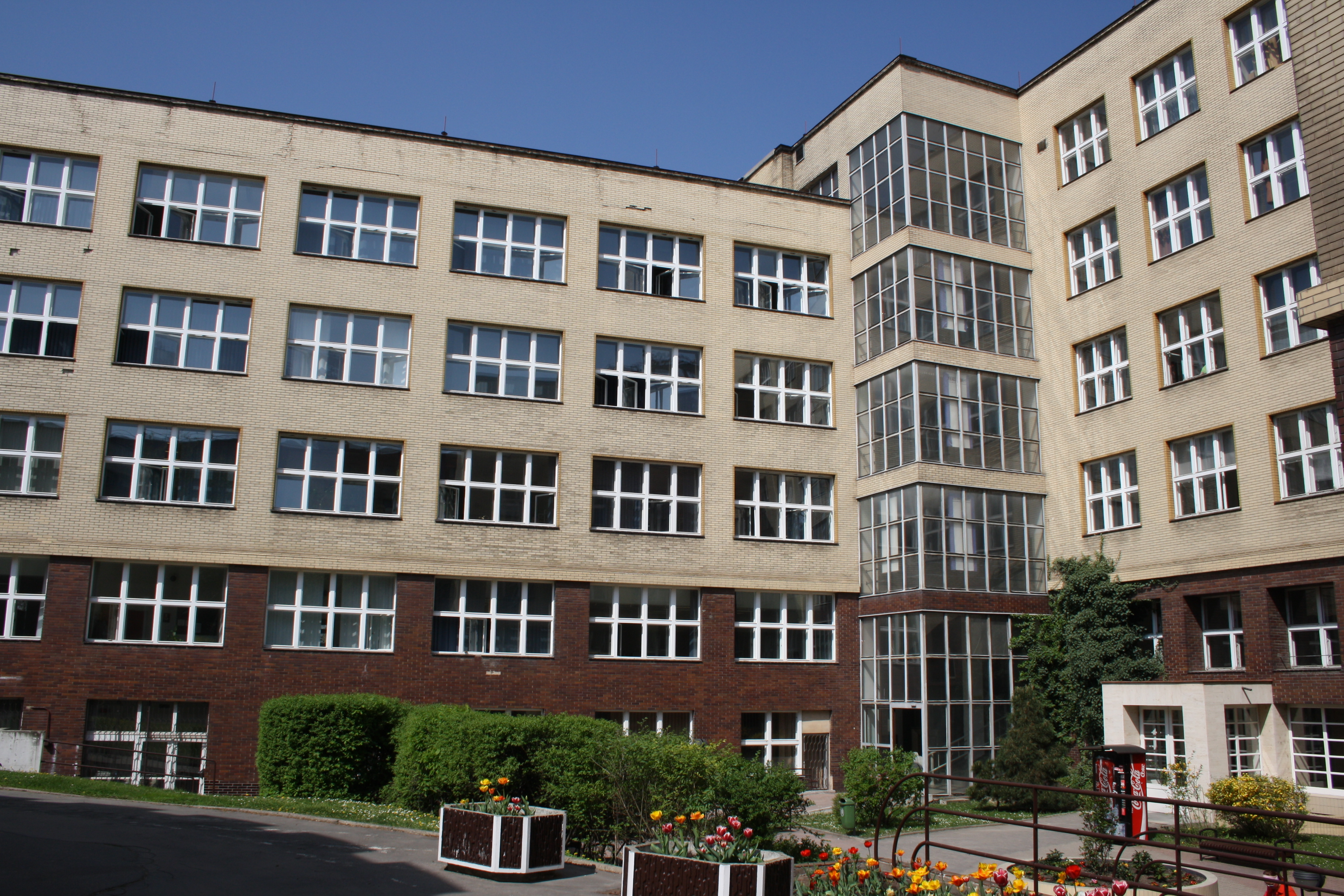
- Type: Public
- Established: 1991
- Dean: prof. Ing. Jakub Fischer, Ph.D.
- Students: 2490
- Location: Prague, Czech Republic; 50.0842147°N 14.4411958°E
- Website: fis.vse.cz

The Faculty of Informatics and Statistics (FIS VŠE) (Czech: Fakulta informatiky a statistiky Vysoké školy ekonomické, abbreviated FIS, F4), also known as the School of Informatics and Statistics, is the fourth of six faculties at Prague University of Economics and Business. The faculty was established in 1991, following the dissolution of the Faculty of Direction. Its academic focus is informatics, statistics, econometrics and other mathematical methods applied to business practice. The faculty has eight departments and several research laboratories, and hosts around 2,500 students across its programs.

== Departments ==
Departments of the faculty include:

- Department of Demography (Czech: Katedra demografie; KDEM)
- Department of Econometrics (Czech: Katedra ekonometrie; KEKO)
- Department of Economic Statistics (Czech: Katedra ekonomické statistiky; KEST)
- Department of Information and Knowledge Engineering (Czech: Katedra informačního a znalostního inženýrství; KIZI)
- Department of Information Technologies (Czech: Katedra informačních technologií; KIT) Research activities of the department focus on methodologies for development, operation and management of information systems.
- Department of Mathematics (Czech: Katedra matematiky; KMAT)
- Department of Multimedia (Czech: Katedra multimédií; KME)
- Department of Statistics and Probability (Czech: Katedra statistiky a pravděpodobnosti; KSTP)
- Department of Systems Analysis (Czech: Katedra systémové analýzy; KSA), focusing on the application of principles of systems methodology and systems thinking into the fields of information systems, and business and management. Its main areas of research interest include: implementation of information systems within an organization, information management, strategic planning and business reengineering.

== Academics ==
The faculty offers Bachelor, Master and doctoral study programs.

=== Bachelor programs ===
Bachelor study programs are 3-3,5 years in length and conclude with a Bachelor State Examination and defence of a Bachelor thesis. Bachelor theses usually focus on practical topics.

- Applied Informatics
- Information Media and Services
- Mathematical Methods in Economics, a program focusing on quantitative methods, and the inter-related fields of economics, business economics and mathematical methods.
- Multimedia in Economic Practice
- Socio-economic demography, a study program focused mainly on reproduction of human resources and human capital, covering topics from demography to social and economic policy.
- Statistical Methods in Economics, a program focusing on applying statistical methods to real economics.
- Statistics and Econometrics, a course focusing on statistics, various methods bordering economics and mathematics, econometric and mathematical modelling and informatics.

=== Master programs ===
Masters programs end with a Final State Examination and defence of a thesis. Available subjects are divided into Major and Minor:

Major

- Business Informatics (distance learning)
- Cognitive Informatics
- Knowledge Engineering
- Econometrics and Operation Research
- Economic Demography
- Information Management
- Information Systems Management
- Information Systems and Technologies
- Statistics

Minor

- Analysis of Socioeconomic Data
- Business Information Technology
- Communication, Interpretation, Multimedia (for remote study)
- Corporate Performance Management
- Data Engineering
- Demography and Social Analysis
- Econometrics
- Insurance Mathematics
- Intelligent Systems
- Multimedia Communication
- Presentation and the Communication of the Information
- Quantitative Methods in Management
- Quantitative Methods for IT Students (for remote study)
- Quantitative Analysis
- Security Management
- Software Quality Management

=== Doctoral programs ===
Doctoral programs are usually at least three years long and conclude with the defence of a PhD thesis. Programs offered include Informatics, Econometrics and Operations Research, and Statistics.

== Academic cooperation ==
The faculty cooperates with several academic and non-academic institutions, including Czech Technical University in Prague, Academy of Sciences of the Czech Republic, Czech Statistical Office, and a number of foreign universities.

== Gallery ==
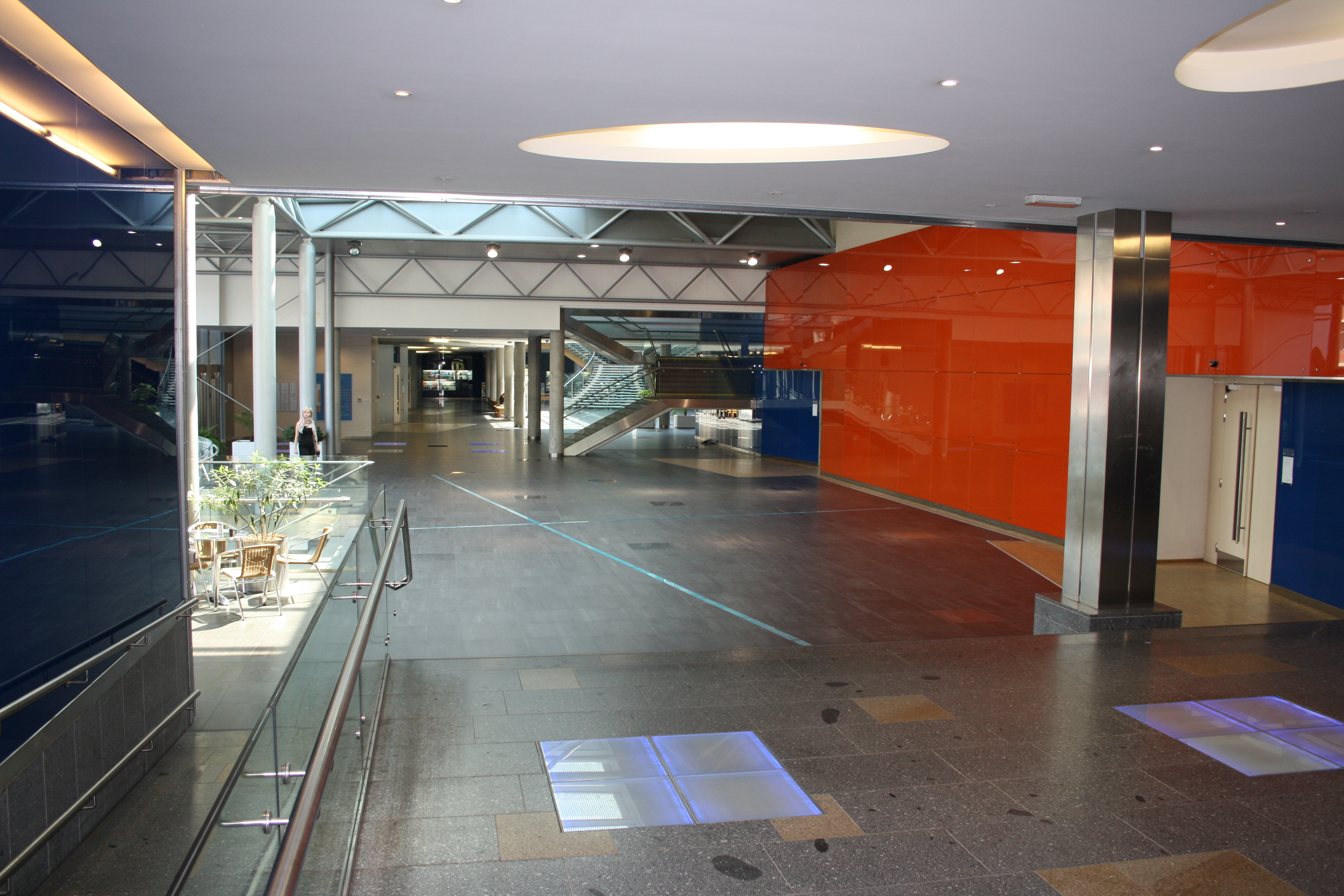
Rajska building

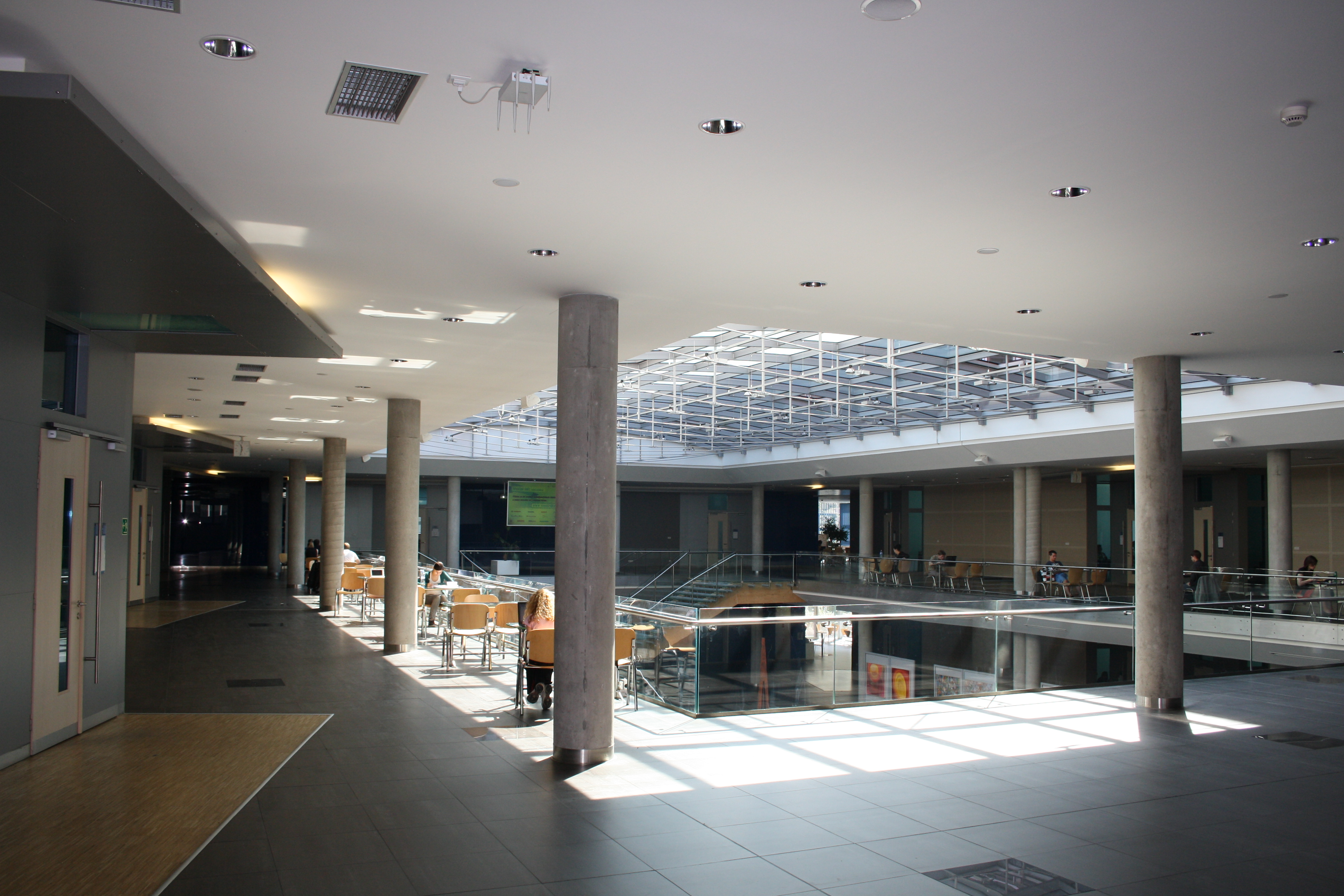
Rajska building (upper gallery)

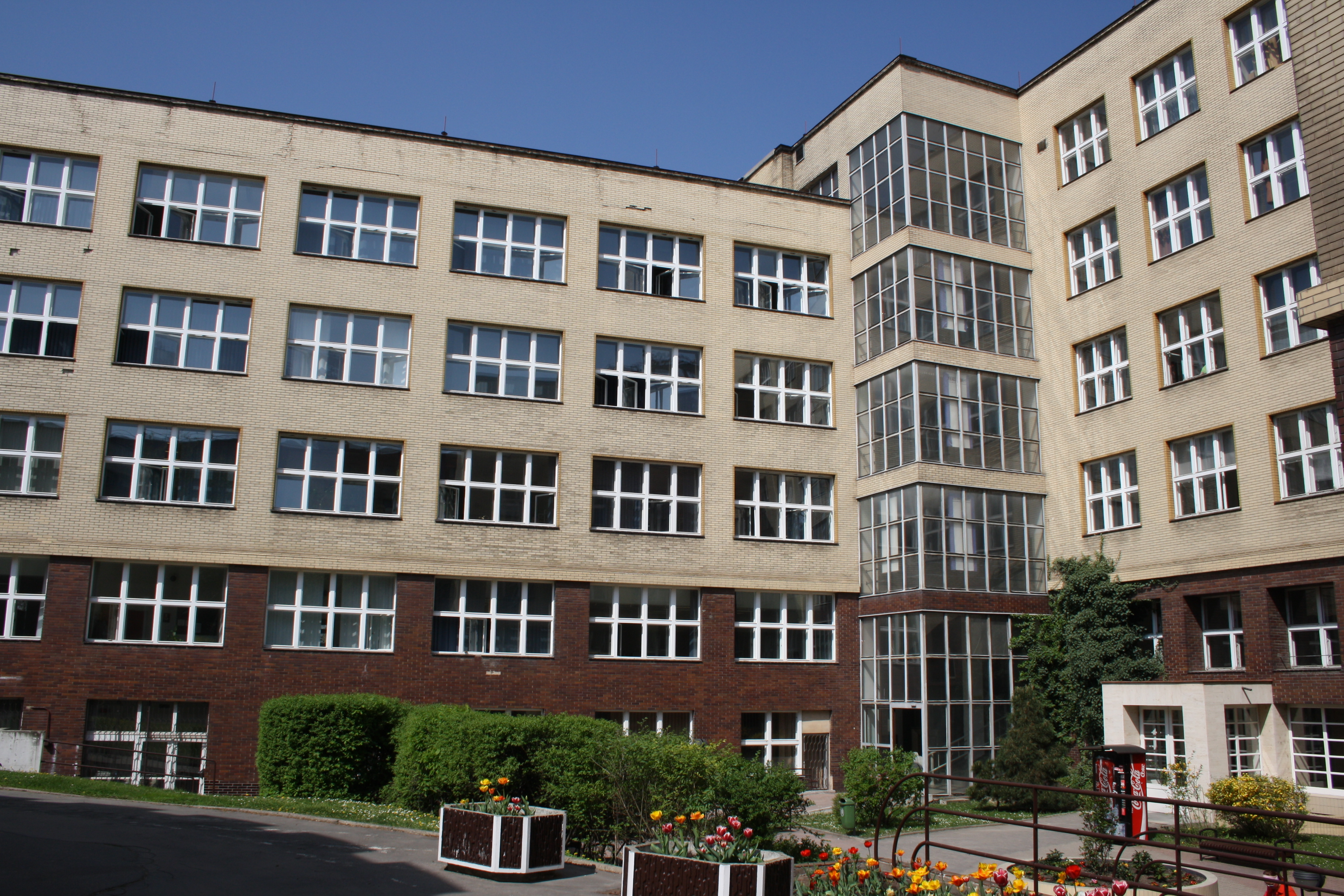
Old building

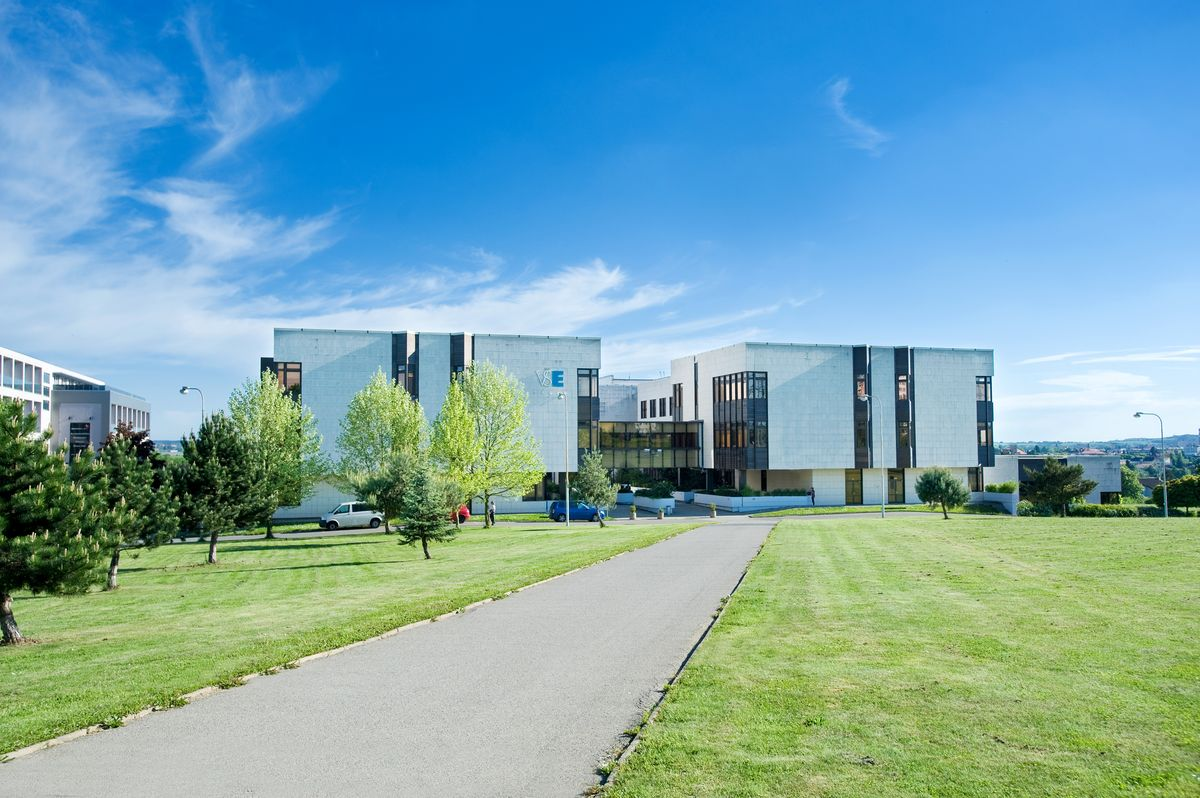
The Campus at Jižní Město
