= Mojmír Hampl =

Czech economist

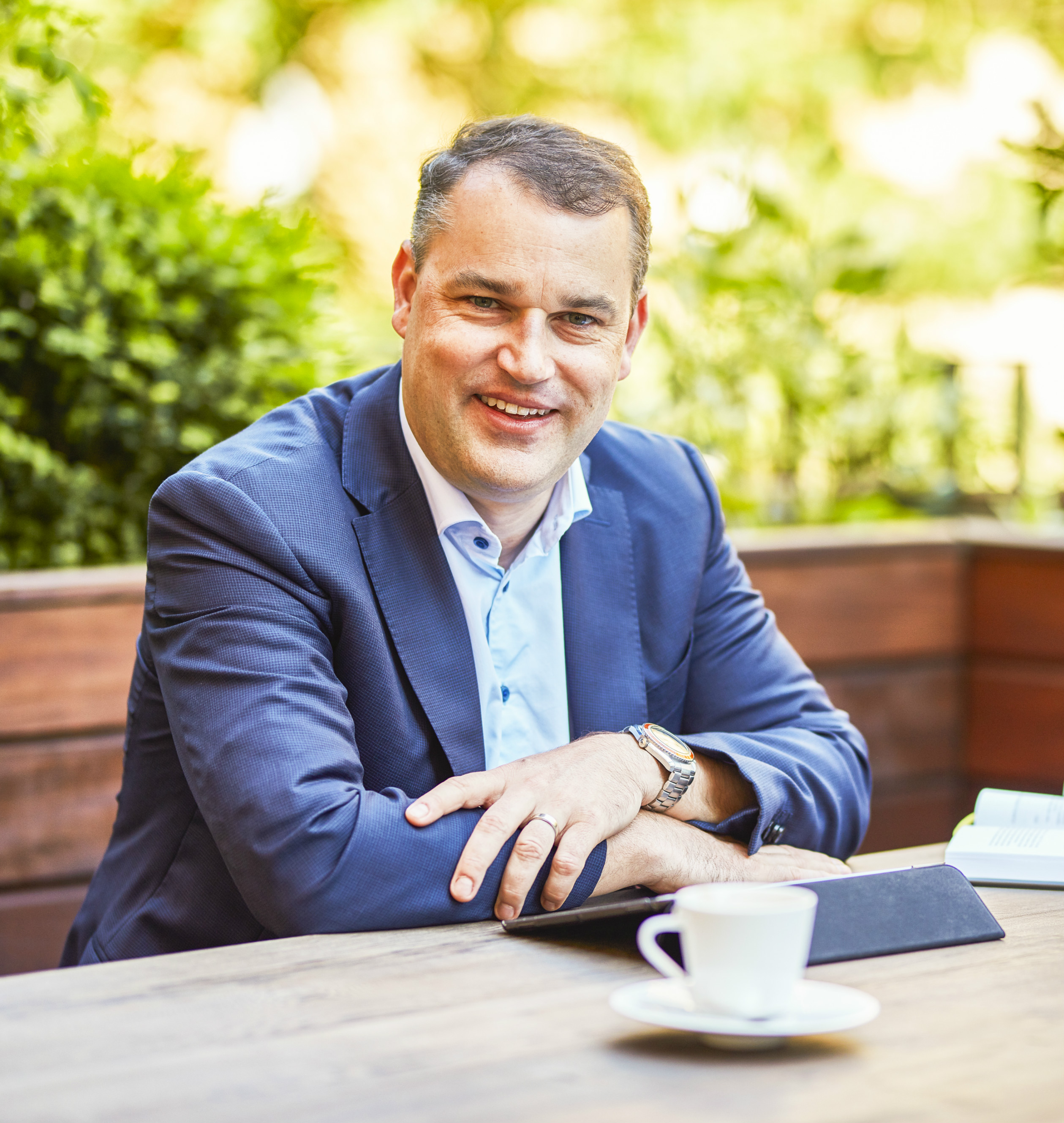

Chairman Czech Fiscal Council
- Incumbent
- Assumed office 14 July 2022
- Preceded by: Eva Zamrazilová

Director responsible for financial sector services at KPMG Czech Republic
- In office 2019–2021

Vice-Governor Czech National Bank
- In office 1 March 2008 – 30 November 2018

Member Czech National Bank
- In office 1 December 2006 – 30 November 2018

Personal details
- Born: 13 March 1975 (age 51) Gottwaldow, Czechoslovakia
- Education: University of Economics, Prague; University of Surrey

Mojmír Hampl (born 13 March 1975) is a Czech economist and writer, who has been the Chairman of the Czech Fiscal Council since 2022. Previously, from 2019 to 2021, he worked for KPMG Czech Republic as a director responsible for financial sector services. Between 2006 and 2018 he served as a board member of the Czech National Bank. From 2008 he held the post of CNB Vice-Governor. He has been also a co-founder and a board member of the Institute of Economic Education INEV in Prague.

== Career ==
Hampl is a member of the academic council of Škoda Auto University in Mladá Boleslav and scientific councils of Tomas Bata University in Zlín and Masaryk University in Brno, and was an editorial board member of the Czech history newspaper The Twentieth Century. He lectures at Czech and foreign universities, including University of Oxford. He has published three popular educational books in Czech.

== Controversies ==
Hampl has been a supporter of helicopter money, which he calls "direct support of consumption." In a deep recession accompanied by deflation, he argues that central banks should create new money and send them to households via central bank digital currency. According to Hampl, such a policy would circumvent the complicated monetary transmission mechanism inherent in the use of quantitative easing and support aggregate demand directly. His proposals were endorsed by, for example, Eric Lonergan. However, critics claim that helicopter money drops could lead to a sharp increase in inflation rates.

Hampl is also opposed to euro adoption in the Czech Republic and gave a speech in the European Parliament on the potential break-up of the euro area. In his speeches, he frequently asks a potential of cryptocurrencies to become a full-fledged alternative to conventional money and defends a traditional elastic money system.

In 2010, he had a public dispute with the IMF caused by his claim in the Austrian newspaper Der Standard that the IMF by its communication effectively worsened the 2008 financial crisis in Central and Eastern Europe. The IMF denied this claim.
