= Faculty of International Relations, University of Economics in Prague =

International relations school

Faculty of International Relations University of Economics in Prague
- Fakulta mezinárodních vztahů Vysoké školy ekonomické
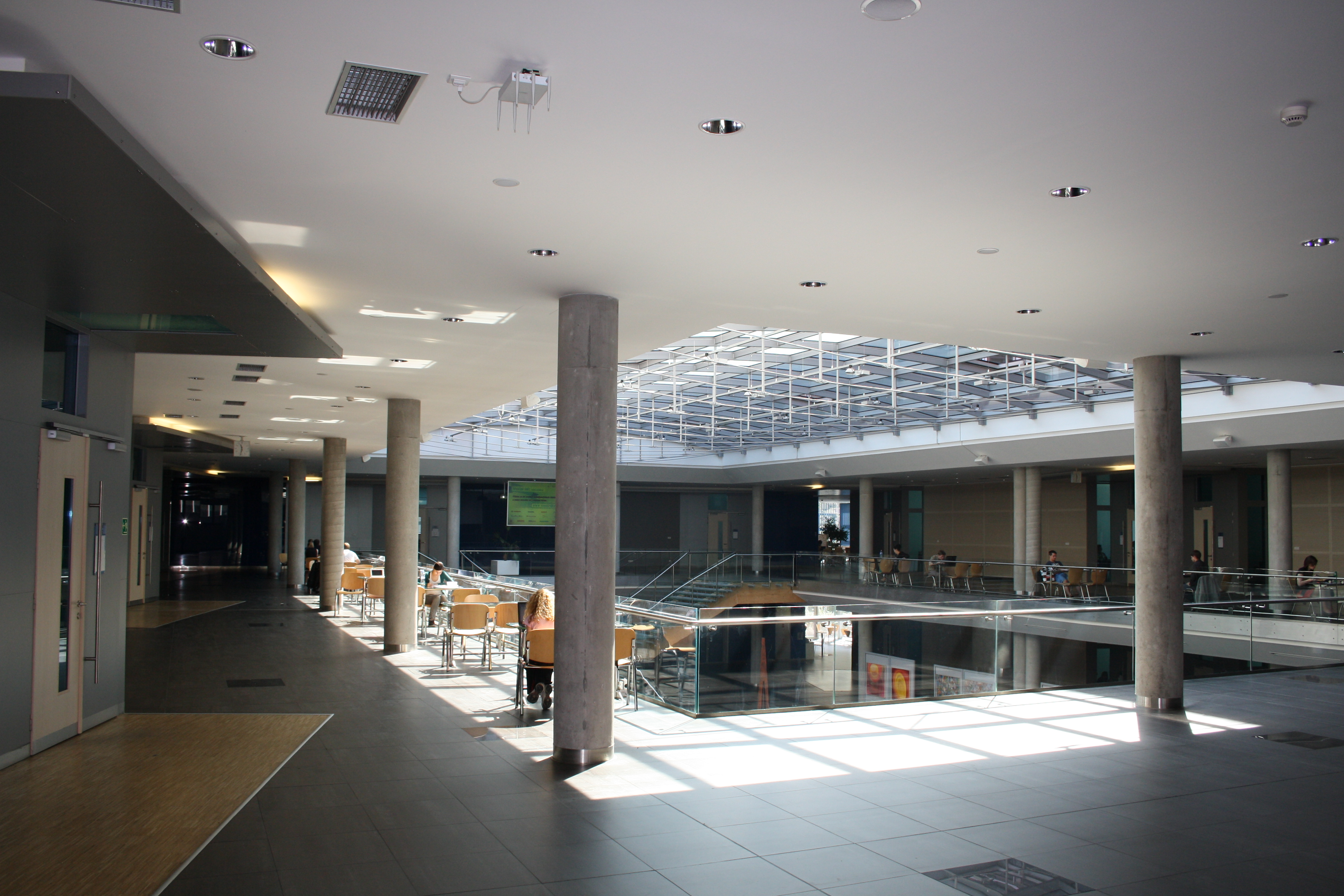
- Type: Public
- Established: 1991
- Dean: doc. Ing. Josef Taušer, Ph.D.
- Administrative staff: 252
- Students: 4446
- Location: Prague, Czech Republic; 50°5′2.61″N 14°26′27.96″E
- Website: fir.vse.cz

The Faculty of International Relations (FIR) (Czech: Fakulta mezinárodních vztahů Vysoké školy ekonomické, abbreviated FMV) is one of six faculties at the University of Economics, Prague (VŠE), located within the main university campus in Prague, Czech Republic. The faculty specializes in teaching and research in fields related to international economic and political relations.

== Cooperation with Corporate Partners ==
FIR cooperates with various corporate partners. Each field of study has a Strategic Review and Corporate Advisory Board involving top managers and representatives from governmental and other institutions, often themselves FIR alumni. These corporate partners support the development of the faculty by involving experts in teaching, providing consultations for theses and seminar papers, offering internships and specialized practices, as well as with financial support for projects. The faculty’s partners include Globus, Komerční banka, L'Oréal, Procter & Gamble, and the Ministry of Foreign Affairs.

FIR is a member of the International Chamber of Commerce.

== Research and projects ==
There are two journals published at the School: Working Papers, and Contemporary Europe.

The School supports a number of student projects and initiatives, of which the most significant is the Prague Student Summit, the largest Model United Nations in Central Europe. The Junior Diplomat Initiative (JDI) is among the most active student organizations, providing a platform for students to interact with Czech and foreign diplomats.

== Alumni ==
- Martin Jahn, businessman and former Deputy Prime Minister for the Economy of the Czech Republic
- Václav Klaus, former President of the Czech Republic, graduated from the faculty (then the Faculty of Commerce) in 1963, majoring in Foreign Trade
- Miloslav Ludvík, Czech Minister of Health (2016–17)
- Josef Tošovský, Prime Minister of the Czech Republic (1997–98), graduated from FIR in 1973
- Zdeněk Tůma, former Czech National Bank Governor

== Gallery ==
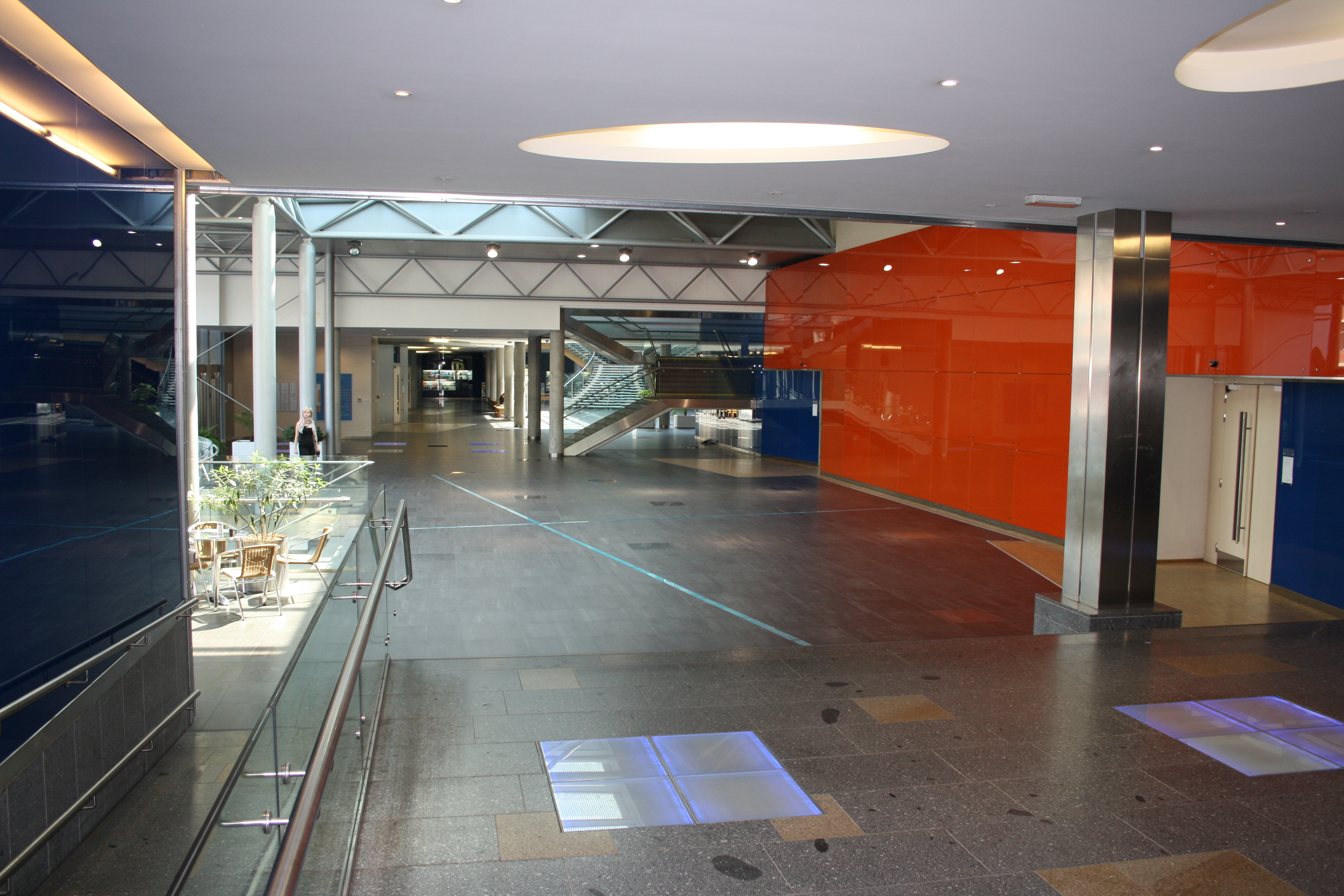
"Rajska building"

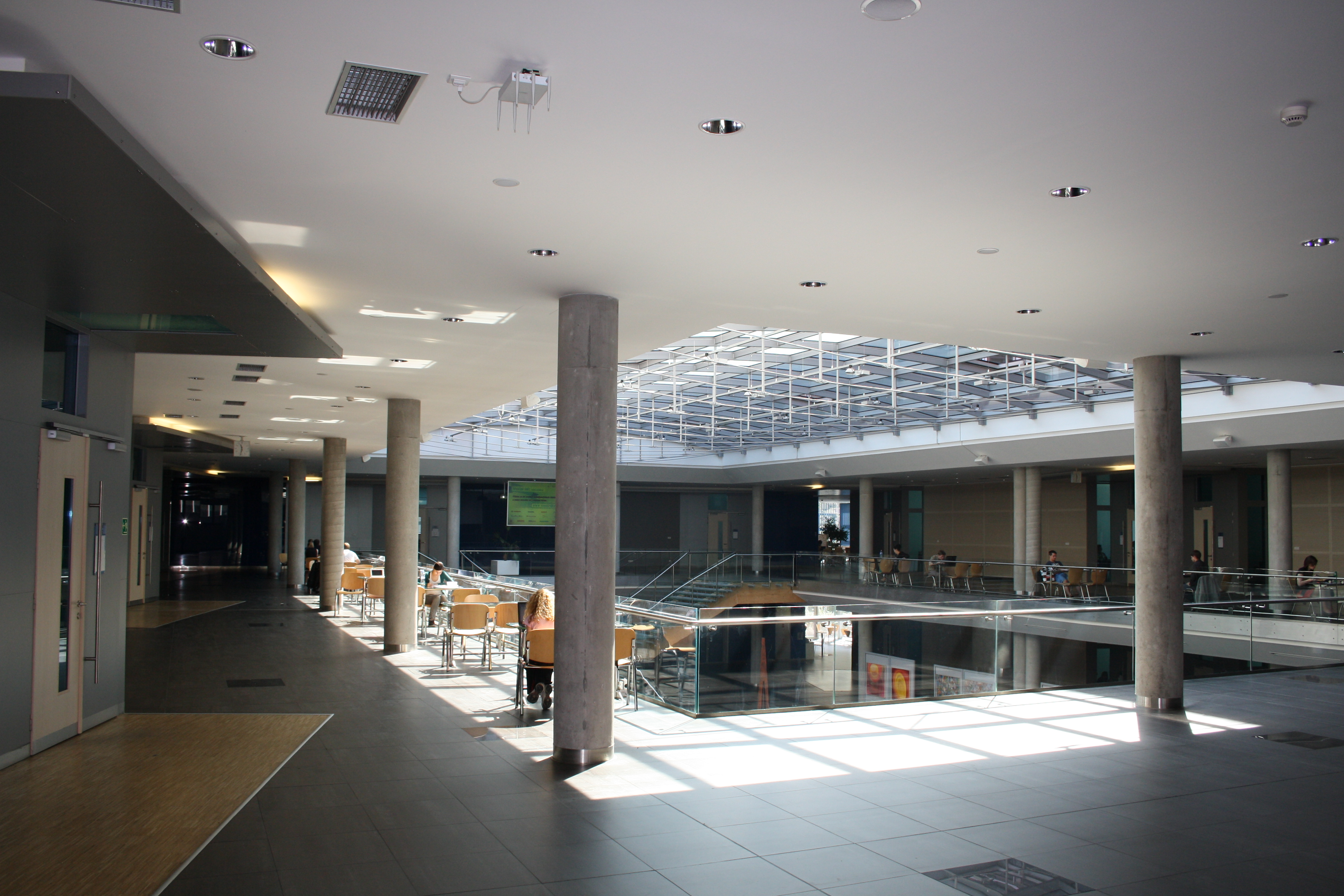
Rajska building (upper gallery)

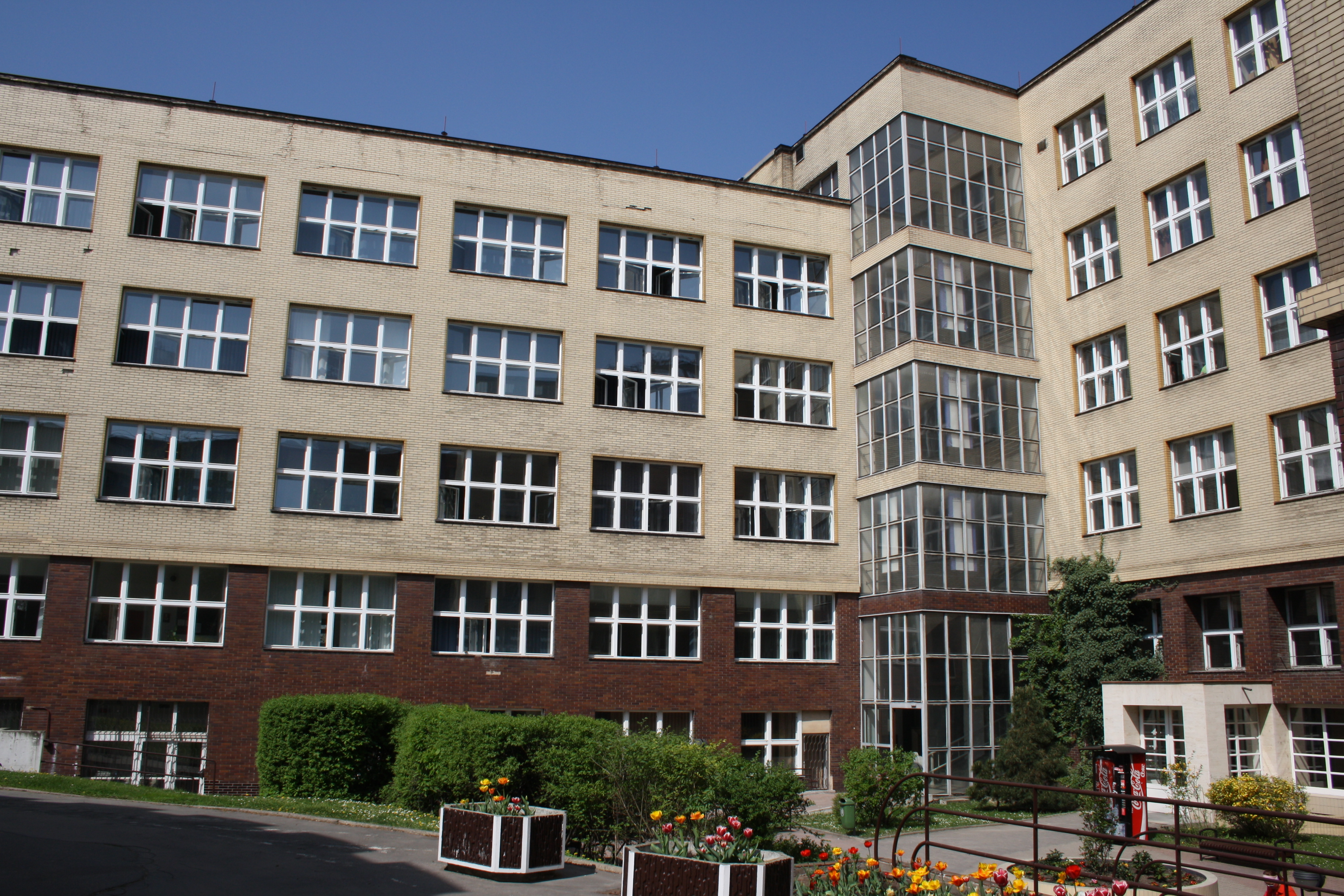
"Old building"
