= Zdeněk Tůma =

Czech economist

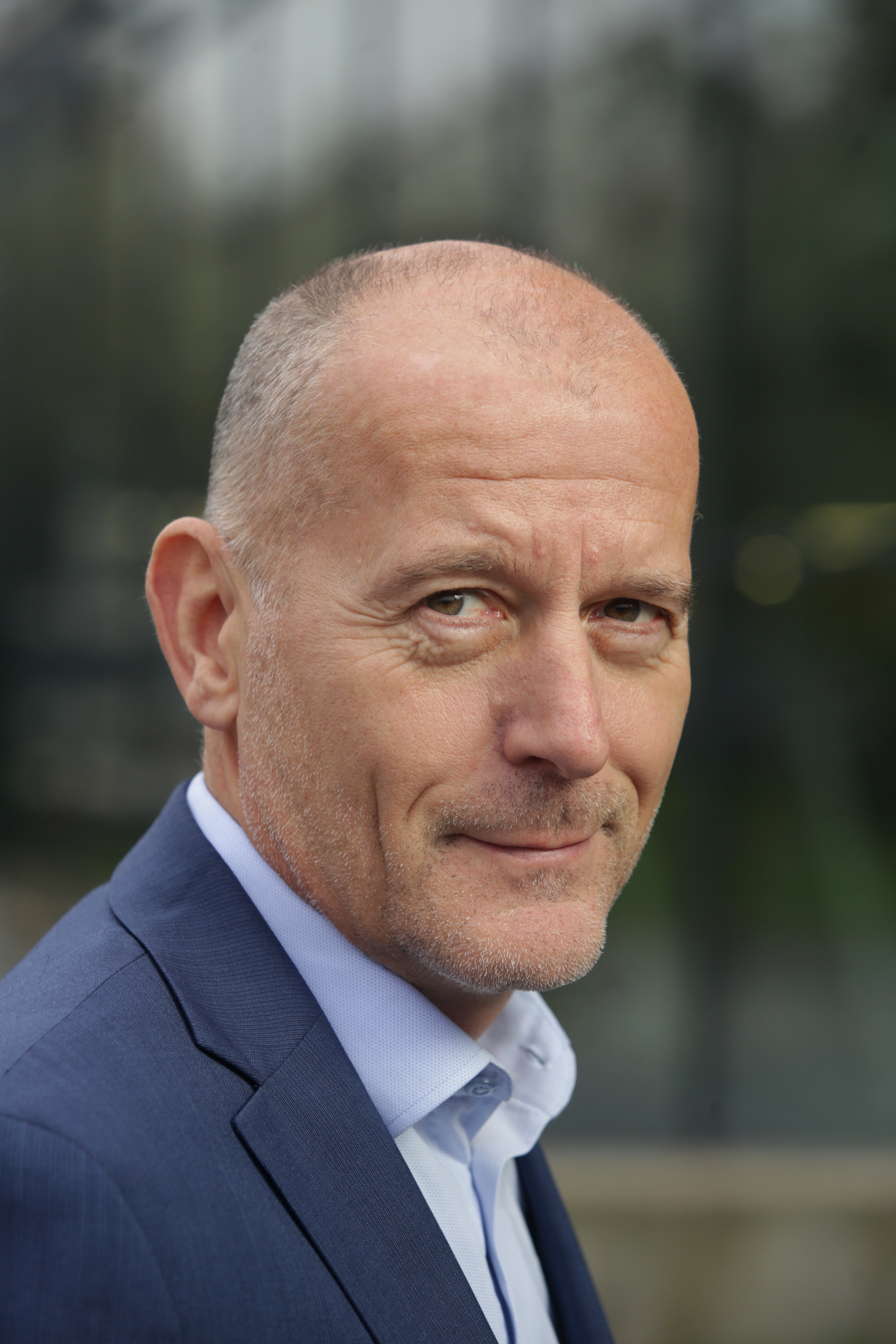
- Zdeněk Tůma (2019)

Governor of the Czech National Bank
- In office 1 December 2000 – 30 June 2010
- Preceded by: Josef Tošovský
- Succeeded by: Miroslav Singer

Vice-Governor of the Czech National Bank
- In office 13 February 1999 – 30 November 2000

Member of the bank board of the Czech National Bank (CNB)
- In office 13 February 1999 – 30 June 2010

Representative of City of Prague
- In office 16 October 2010 – 16 October 2014

Partner responsible for financial sector services at KPMG Czech Republic
- In office 2011–2019

Chairman of the Supervisory Board of ČSOB, a.s.
- Incumbent
- Assumed office 2019
- Preceded by: Pavel Kavánek

Personal details
- Born: 19 October 1960 (age 65) České Budějovice, Czechoslovakia
- Education: University of Economics in Prague; London School of Economics
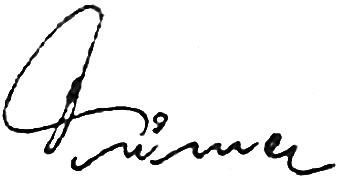
- Signature

Zdeněk Tůma (born 19 October 1960) is a Czech economist. From 2000 to 2010, he was Governor of the Czech National Bank (CNB). From 2011 to 2019, he worked in the private sector at the audit and consulting firm KPMG Czech Republic. Since 2019, he has been the chair of the supervisory board of the ČSOB Group.

== Biography ==
=== Studies and academia ===
Zdeněk Tůma was born on 19 October 1960 in České Budějovice, Czechoslovakia. After graduating from the Business Academy in České Budějovice, he studied at the Faculty of Trade at the University of Economics in Prague from 1979 to 1983, where he was a lecturer for another three years after graduation. In 1986, he joined the Institute of Forecasting of the Czechoslovak Academy of Sciences as a researcher, where he completed postgraduate studies in economics from 1987 to 1992. After completing his postgraduate studies, he moved to the Institute of Economic Studies at the Faculty of Social Sciences of Charles University, where he became head of the Department of Macroeconomics. He was then appointed associate professor there in 1995.

He continues to lecture at Charles University in Prague. He has been or is a member of various scientific and administrative boards of Czech universities (Charles University, Czech Technical University in Prague, Prague University of Economics and Business, University of South Bohemia in České Budějovice, Academy of Performing Arts in Prague). Since 2000 he has been a member of the Board of Governors and since 2018 he has been the Vice-Chairman of the Board of Governors of The English College in Prague.

=== Studying abroad ===
Zdeněk Tůma completed several study stays at foreign universities in the first half of the 1990s:

- United Kingdom (London School of Economics, University of Cambridge);
- Netherlands (Tinbergen Institute in Amsterdam);
- United States (George Mason University in Washington, DC).

=== 1990s ===
From 1993 to 1995, he worked as an advisor to the Minister of Industry and Trade Vladimír Dlouhý. In 1995, Zdeněk Tůma became the chief economist of Patria Finance a.s. and worked there until 1998. From 1 June 1998 he served as Executive Director of the European Bank for Reconstruction and Development, until he joined the Czech National Bank in early 1999.

=== At the CNB (1999–2010) ===
On 13 February 1999, President Václav Havel appointed him Vice Governor of the Czech National Bank, and then on 1 December 2000 as its Governor. He was confirmed in this position by President Václav Klaus for another six-year term on 11 February 2005. Along with the other members of the Bank Board, Tůma had a wide range of responsibilities as Governor of the CNB, including monetary policy, financial market supervision, foreign exchange reserve management, the payment system and currency processing.

As governor, he represented the Czech Republic at the International Monetary Fund and the Bank for International Settlements (BIS) from 2000 to 2010. From 1 May 2004, when the Czech Republic joined the European Union, he was also a member of the General Council of the European System of Central Banks. He is a member of the Czech Economic Society and served as its President from 1999 to 2001.

Tůma announced on 15 April 2010 that he would resign as Governor of the CNB as of 30 June 2010. He submitted his resignation to President Václav Klaus on 18 June 2010. Miroslav Singer was appointed as his replacement.

=== In politics ===
In the 2010 Prague municipal election, Tůma led TOP 09's candidate list as the party's mayoral candidate. From 2011 to 2012, he was chair of the Finance Committee of Prague City Council. On 15 October 2014, he resigned from TOP 09 due to disputes within the party's Prague organization, and switched his support to the Mayor of Prague, Tomáš Hudeček.

=== KPMG and ČSOB ===
He returned to the private sector in 2011, when he joined the audit and advisory firm KPMG Czech Republic as Partner in charge of services for the financial sector. His responsibilities also included advising on sports, lotteries and gaming. He left KPMG in 2019, and from 16 October that year he took up the position of chair of the Supervisory Board of ČSOB a.s., where he succeeded Pavel Kavánek.

== Other activities ==
- From 2011 to 2019, he was Chairman of the Board of the CERGE-EI Foundation, which supports economic education and research.
- Since 2016, he has been a member of the Supervisory Board of the Committee of Good Will – Olga Havlová Foundation.
- From 2012 to 2013, he served as a member of the board of directors of the international non-profit organization Aspen Institute Central Europe o.p.s. and since 2021, he has served as a member of the supervisory board of this company.
- From 2020 to 2023 he was a member of the Presidium of the Czech Banking Association (CBA).
- From 2002 to 2016, he served as a member of the board of trustees of the Museum Kampa – Jan and Meda Mládek Foundation.
- Since 2020 he has been the managing director of IRQ management s.r.o. and since the same year he has also been the chairman of the supervisory board of IRQ FUNDS SICAV a.s.
- Since 2021, he has been a member of the board of directors of the Global Institute for Macroprudential Modeling, z.ú., which deals with macroeconomic analysis and macro-financial modeling.
- In 2022, he was admitted as a Fellow of the College of Central Bankers.
- He is a member of the Supervisory Board of The Bakala Foundation, which implements programs and projects aimed at supporting the development of young talents (investigative journalists, independent journalists, aspiring architects, those interested in studying abroad).
- From 2022 to 2023, he was an economic advisor to the President Petr Pavel during his election campaign.
- He is a member of the Supervisory Board of K&H Bank in Hungary.

== See also ==
- Štefan Füle
- Liikanen report
- TOPAZ (think tank)
- 2010 Prague municipal election
- Czech Republic and the euro
- List of people associated with the London School of Economics
- Hanno R. Ellenbogen Citizenship Award
