= Czech National Bank =

Central bank of the Czech Republic

Czech National Bank Česká národní banka (in Czech)

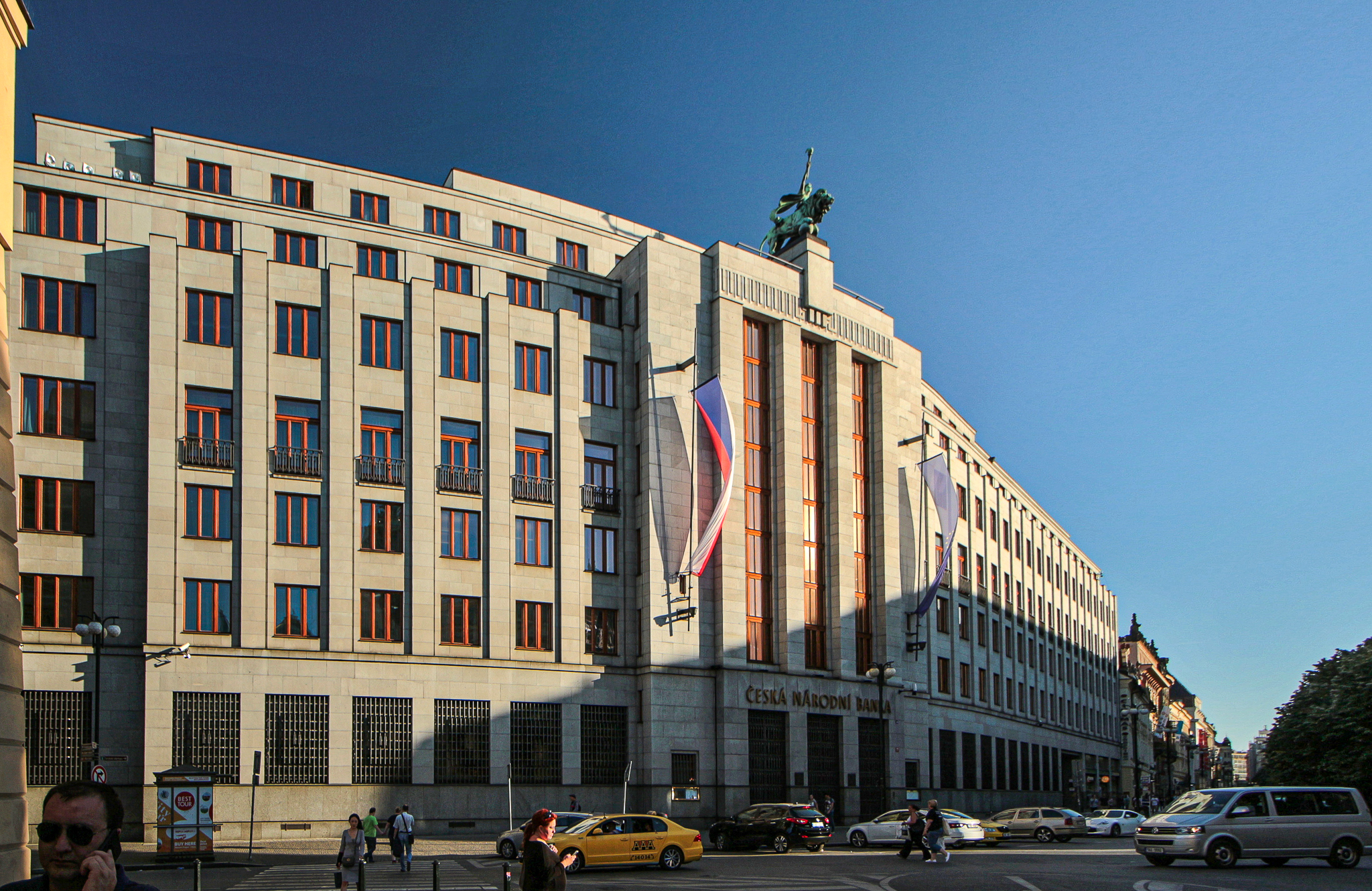
- Czech National Bank headquarters in Prague
- Headquarters: Prague, Czech Republic
- Coordinates: 50°05′13″N 14°25′42″E
- Established: January 1, 1993
- Ownership: 100% state ownership
- Governor: Aleš Michl
- Central bank of: Czech Republic
- Currency: Czech koruna CZK (ISO 4217)
- Reserves: 62 630 million USD
- Preceded by: National Bank of Czechoslovakia
- Website: www.cnb.cz/en/

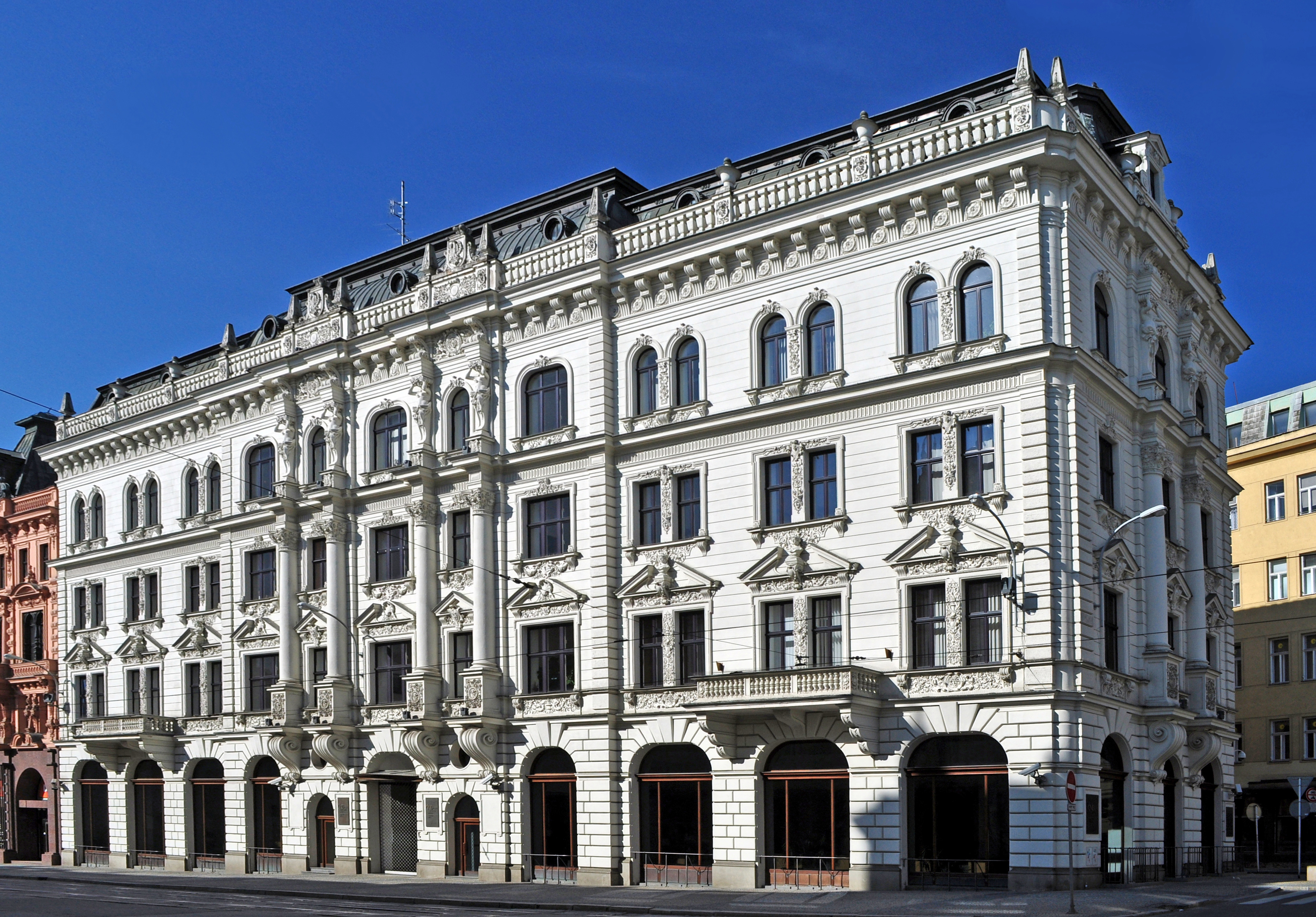
ČNB branch in Brno

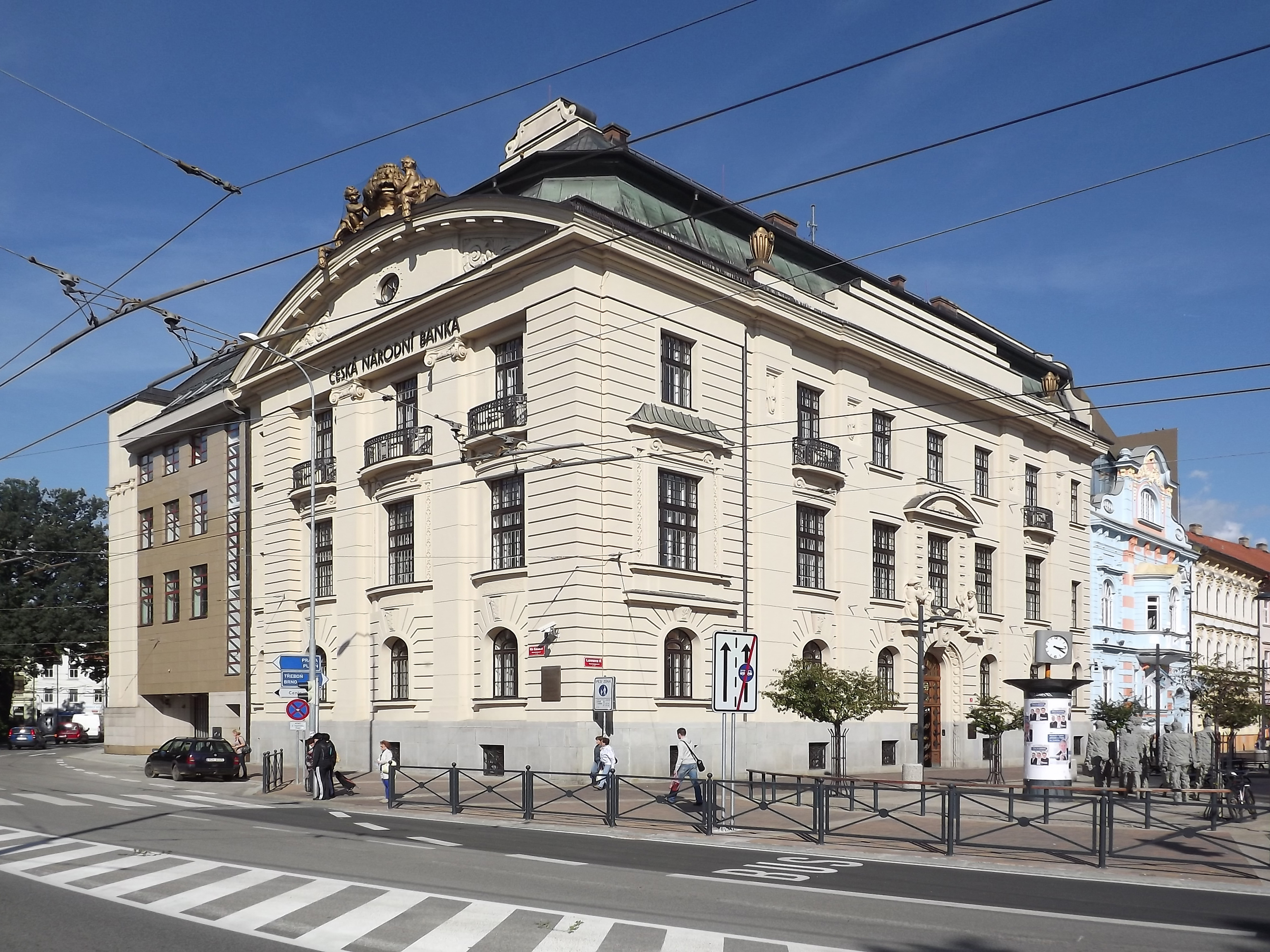
ČNB branch in České Budějovice

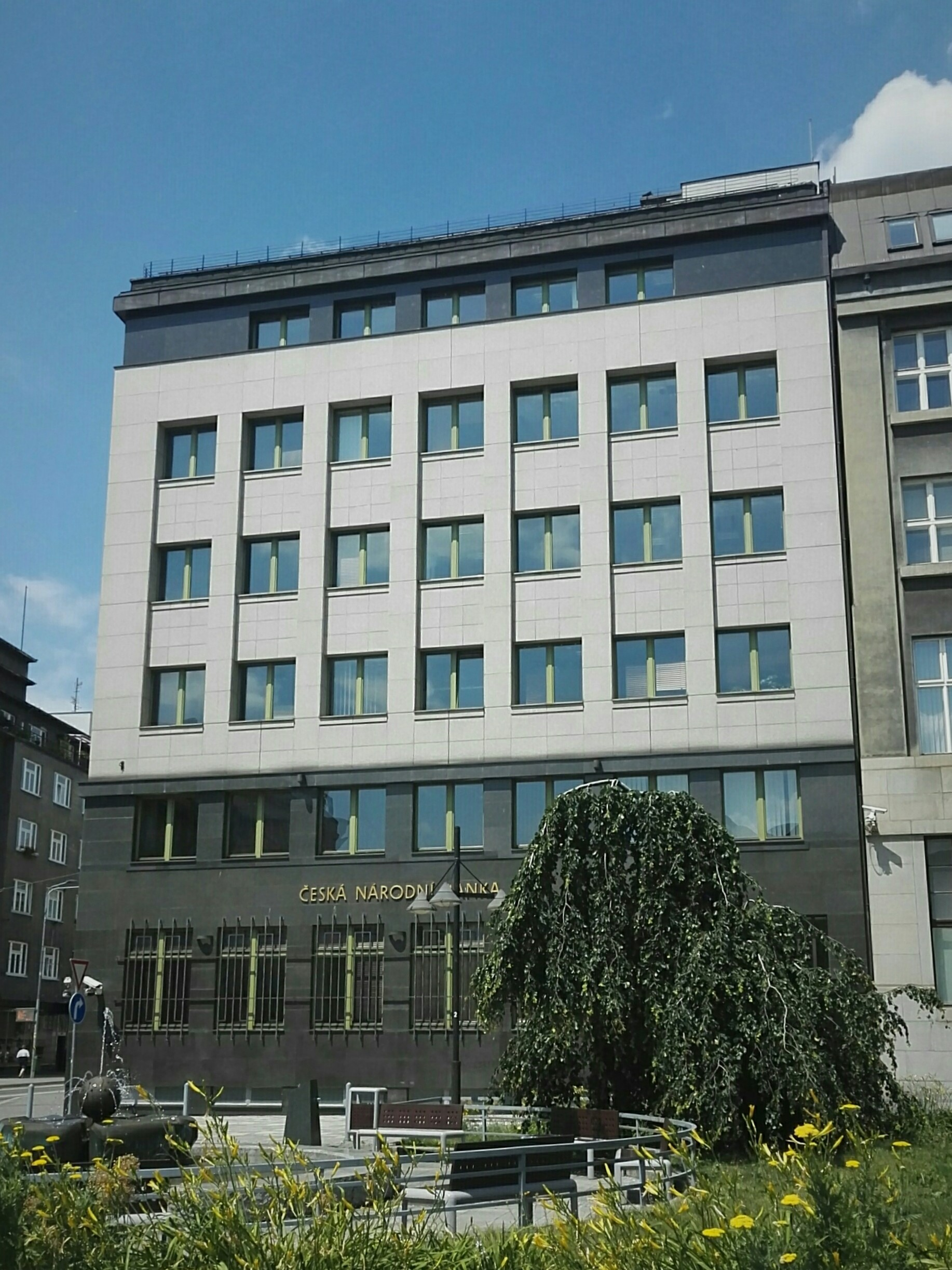
ČNB branch in Ostrava

The Czech National Bank, (Czech: Česká národní banka, ČNB) is the central bank and financial market supervisor in the Czech Republic, headquartered in Prague. It is a member of the European System of Central Banks. It was established on 1 January 1993 from the division of the State Bank of Czechoslovakia as part of the process of dissolution of Czechoslovakia, together with the National Bank of Slovakia.

In accordance with its primary objective, the CNB sets monetary policy, issues banknotes and coins and manages the circulation of the Czech koruna, the payment system and settlement between banks. It also performs supervision of the banking sector, the capital market, the insurance industry, pension funds, credit unions and electronic money institutions, as well as foreign exchange supervision.

Under European Union policy frameworks, the ČNB is a voting member of the respective Boards of Supervisors of the European Banking Authority (EBA), European Insurance and Occupational Pensions Authority (EIOPA), and European Securities and Markets Authority (ESMA). It also provides the permanent single common representative for Czechia in the Supervisory composition of the General Board of the Anti-Money Laundering Authority (AMLA). It is also a member of the European Systemic Risk Board (ESRB).

== Overview of the Czech National Bank ==
=== Mission ===
The primary objective of CNB as stated in the Act on the Czech National Bank and the Constitution of the Czech Republic is price stability. The secondary objective is to support sustainable economic growth. It currently employs inflation targeting monetary transmission mechanism. The goal is to stabilize inflation around 2.0% per annum.

=== Organization ===
The Czech National Bank, located in Prague at 28 Na Příkopě, has remained in the same building through multiple government transitions. The leaders of the Czech National Bank are on the "Bank Board". The Bank Board is responsible for setting and implementing monetary policy.

The Bank Board consists of seven members: The Governor of the Czech National Bank, two Vice-Governors and four other members of the Bank Board. The Governor and Vice-Governors are appointed and relieved by the President of the Republic. No person is able to hold a position on the Bank Board for more than two terms. Each term lasts for six years and acts independent of other Governing bodies.

=== Currency ===
The CNB maintains exclusive rights to issue and regulate banknotes and coins. The Bank oversees the legal and technical protection of the currency, the Koruna (also called the Crown). The Czech Republic was scheduled to adopt the Euro in 2010, but due to popular opinion, the Czech government opted to stay with the crown. Consequently, the implementation of the Euro was suspended indefinitely.

The Czech National Bank issues 1Kč, 2 Kč, 5 Kč, 10 Kč, 20 Kč and 50 Kč coins. The note denominations consist of 100 Kč, 200 Kč, 500 Kč, 1,000 Kč, 2,000 Kč and 5,000 Kč.

=== Czech National Bank and the Euro ===
The Czech Republic officially joined the European Union on 1 May 2004. The original intention of the Czech National Bank was to adopt the Euro, but after relatively strong economic progress within the Czech Republic and a favorable national attitude for the Czech Koruna there are no current plans to change the currency. With no political or public urgency, the Czech Republic will most likely not join the Euro Area and adopt the Exchange Rate Mechanism in the coming years.

=== Czech National Bank regulation of the markets ===
As the supervisor of the financial markets in the Czech Republic, the CNB maintains authority over, the banking sector, capital markets, the insurance industry, pension funds, credit unions, and payment system institutions.(CNB Website) The CNB sets the rules and regulations for the industries that they preside over and systematically check in on the many financial institutions. Any institution that does not conform to the regulations outlined by the CNB is subject to penalties and restrictions.

=== Monetary policy ===
The CNB states that their primary objective is to maintain price stability. In order to keep prices stable, the Central bank implements tools, such as setting interest rates. Upon entry into the European Union the CNB will yield policy and control over to the European Central Bank.

The favored pursuit of the CNB in order to control monetary policy is inflation targeting. By using inflation forecasts and macroeconomic predictions the CNB attempts to achieve an optimal inflation rate of between 1-3%. By forecasting the various factors and inputs of inflation and adjusting interest rates accordingly, the CNB has been able to control their inflation.

Banks can deposit excess liquidity overnight with the CNB at the discount rate and can borrow overnight funds at the lombard rate. Thus these two rates create a corridor for the short-term money market rates. Moreover, the CNB conducts open market operations in the form of repurchase agreements (REPOs). The basic duration is 2 weeks. Currently the CNB is absorbing excess liquidity. The aim of these operations is to influence short-term rates which subsequently affect economic activity, the flow of capital, and inflation.

==== Main instruments of monetary policy ====
Open Market Operations: Open market operations are used to steer interest rates. Most of the Open Market Operations are completed through Repo operations. Repo operations are repurchase agreements, where the government sells securities to traders, usually on a short-term agreement.

Automatic Facilities: Automatic facilities create liquidity for the Czech National Bank through independent banks depositing money overnight or other banks that have a Repo agreement with the central bank may take out a loan.

Extraordinary Facilities: In order to support the government bond market, the Central Bank introduced Extraordinary Facilities in 2008. This Extraordinary liquidity provided Repo operations on a longer-term basis of two weeks to three months.

Minimum Reserves: As one of the main monetary instruments in order to control the amount of liquidity on the market, the Central Bank establishes a reserve requirement. By controlling the Minimum Reserves, the Central bank helps the interbank system run smoothly.

FX interventions: By purchasing foreign currencies against the Czech Crown, the Central Bank limits risk in the market. FX interventions decrease volatility and help to ease or tighten monetary policy when necessary.

=== Financial markets ===
The Czech National bank determines the value of the Czech currency against foreign currencies. Under the regulation of the Ministry of Finance, the central bank continually adjusts and fixes the exchange rate.

Further involvement of the Czech National Bank in Financial markets is the analysis of inflation expectations. The National Bank analyzes the factors, such as interest rate and exchange rate, that determine the inflation rate and make predictions on expected fluctuations. The prediction of the changes in inflation rate is key to the monetary policy of the central bank. Because of the central banks immediate response to new reports regarding exogenous shocks, policy changes and other market conditions, changes in interest rates and exchange rates prove to be good signals for the central banks market expectations.

== Governors of the Czech National Bank ==
- Josef Tošovský, January 1993 – December 1997
- Pavel Kysilka, December 1997 – July 1998
- Josef Tošovský, July 1998 – November 2000
- Zdeněk Tůma, December 2000 – June 2010
- Miroslav Singer, July 2010 – June 2016
- Jiří Rusnok, July 2016 – June 2022
- Aleš Michl, from July 2022

== See also ==
- Economy of the Czech Republic
- List of banks in the Czech Republic
- List of central banks
- List of financial supervisory authorities by country
