= Prague University of Economics and Business =

Public university in Prague

Prague University of Economics and Business (PUEB)
- Vysoká škola ekonomická v Praze (VŠE)
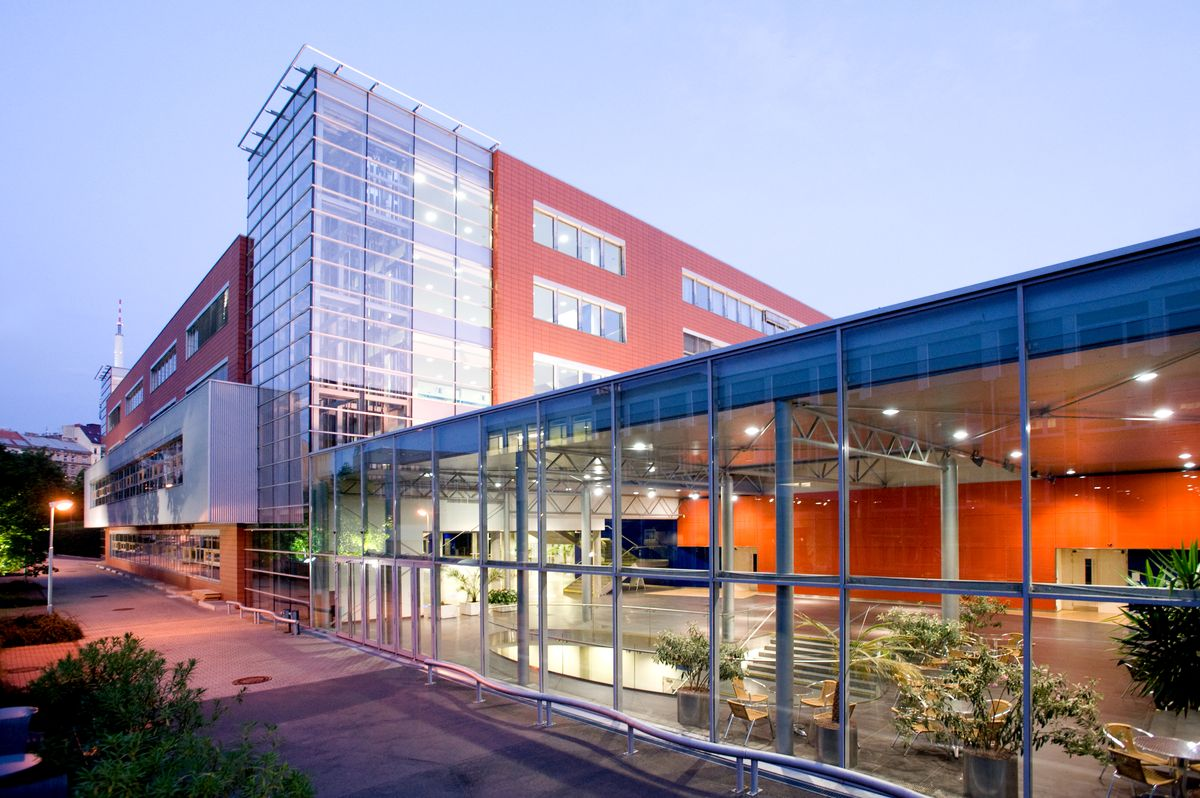
- Type: Public
- Established: 1953
- Academic affiliations: EQUIS, AMBA, AACSB
- Rector: Petr Dvořák
- Administrative staff: 1,000 (of that 600 academic)
- Students: About 14 000 students
- Location: Nám. W. Churchilla 4, 130 67 Praha 3, Prague, Czech Republic; 50°5′2.61″N 14°26′27.96″E
- Website: www.vse.cz/english
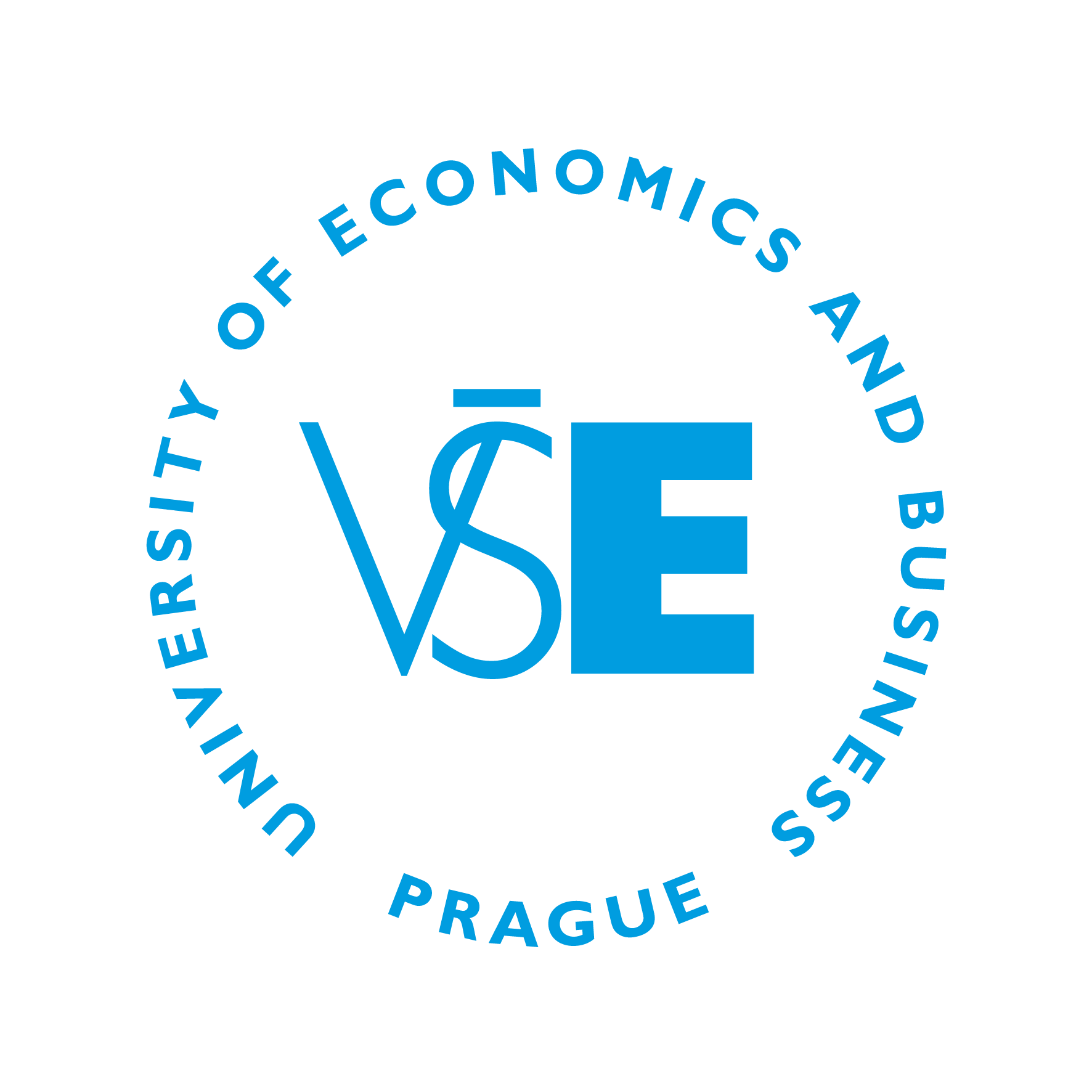

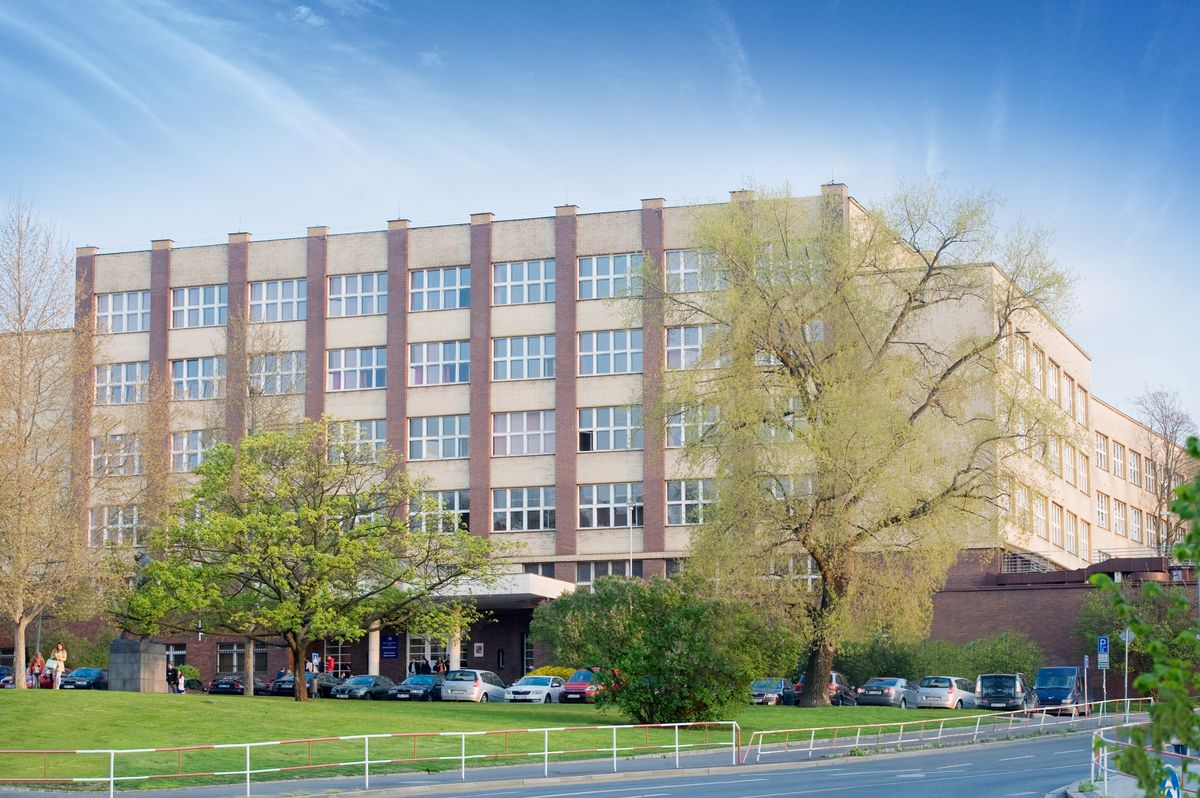
The Old Building (Stará budova) of the University in Žižkov.

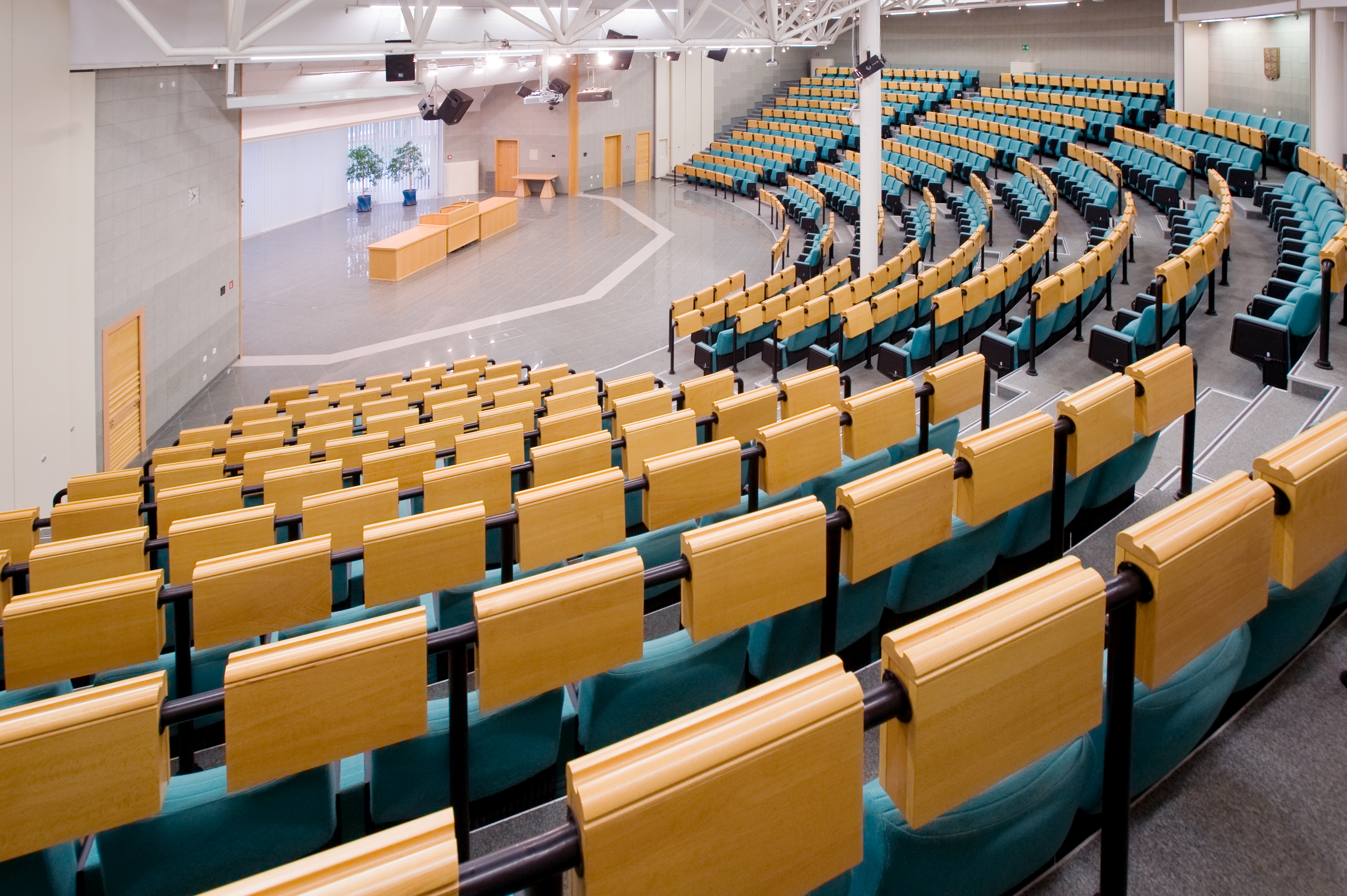
The Vencovský Auditorium (Vencovského aula)

The Prague University of Economics and Business (PUEB) (originally: the University of Economics, Prague; Czech: Vysoká škola ekonomická v Praze, VŠE) is an economics and business-oriented public university located in Prague, Czech Republic. It is the largest university in the field of economics, business and information technology in the Czech Republic, with 14,000 students across its bachelor, master, doctoral and MBA programs. It has been considered the best business school in the Czech Republic and one of the best in Central and Eastern Europe. It is also a part of the CEMS global alliance, and its Faculty of Business Administration holds the Triple Crown accreditation (AACSB, AMBA and EQUIS).

== History ==
Vysoká škola obchodní ("Business School") was established in 1919 as a department of the Czech Technical University in Prague, specializing in wholesale trade, banking, and the organization of industrial companies. In 1949 the Vysoká škola politických a hospodářských věd (University of Political and Economic Sciences) was established, which was finally renamed the University of Economics in 1953. The university underwent a significant reform in 1989 in the aftermath of the Velvet Revolution. In 2020, the international designation of the University of Economics, Prague was changed to Prague University of Economics and Business.

== Schools and campuses ==
The university is composed of six faculties spread over three campuses. The main campus is situated in Žižkov, a central district of the Czech capital. The university maintains a second campus on the outskirts of the city in Jižní Město. The premises of the Faculty of Management are located about 110 km from Prague in Jindřichův Hradec.

The six faculties of the university are:

- Faculty of Finance and Accounting (FFA)
- Faculty of International Relations (FIR)
- Faculty of Business Administration (FBA)
- Faculty of Informatics and Statistics (FIS)
- Faculty of Economics (FEPA)
- Faculty of Management in Jindřichův Hradec (FM)

== Academics and ranking ==
In 2025, the Prague University of Economics and Business was officially awarded the title of the Best Business School in Central and Eastern Europe by the Eduniversal ranking agency.

The Financial Times ranked Prague University of Economics and Business as 52nd in 2023, 49th in 2024 and 48th in 2025 among the best business schools in Europe.

In the 2025 QS World University Rankings by Subject, the university was ranked in the 201–250 range globally.

The Faculty of Business Administration (FBA) achieved the "Triple Crown" accreditation status in 2024, having been accredited by AACSB, AMBA, and EQUIS. With this recognition, FBA became the only institution in the Czech Republic and one of a limited number of business schools in Europe to hold accreditation from all three major international business school accreditation bodies.

In the Times Higher Education World University Rankings 2023, Prague University of Economics and Business (PUEB) was ranked 1501+ in the world. As a specialized institution focused primarily on business and economics, it performs more strongly in subject-specific rankings.

The CEMS Master in Management program ranked 17th worldwide in the Financial Times Ranking 2025.

In the QS Business Master's Rankings 2025, the Faculty of Business Administration at the Prague University of Economics and Business was ranked in the 121-130 band worldwide for Master's in Management, and in the 151-200 band worldwide for Master's in Finance.

== International co-operation ==
Over 1000 students spend a semester abroad every year, at institutions including Duke University (Fuqua School of Business), Copenhagen Business School, University of St. Gallen, and Vienna University.

VŠE cooperates with 250 partner universities, including Sciences Po Paris, University of Cologne, Tilburg University, Stockholm School of Economics, University of St. Gallen, London School of Economics, Tel Aviv University, University of Queensland, McGill University, Duke University, University of Texas at Austin and University of North Carolina at Chapel Hill. The school issues a number of international degrees, including joint and double degrees. Each year, around 60 visiting professors come to teach at the university, and more than 90 courses are taught in English.

As of 2000, the university has been awarding the Gary Becker Prize for the best student's thesis in economics (a prize previously associated with IMADEC of Vienna).

The university is a member of the Global Alliance in Management Education (CEMS), Association of Professional Schools of International Affairs (APSIA), and Partnership in International Management (PIM) networks.

In addition, over 1100 students from institutions overseas come to VŠE each semester. In 2005, a new International Learning Center was established as part of expansion of university premises. Courses for these students are run in Czech, English, German, French, and Russian languages.

== Notable alumni ==
- Jan Fischer (born 1951), statistician, Prime Minister of the Czech Republic (2009–10), Minister of Finance of the Czech Republic (2013–14). Graduated 1974, completed post-graduate studies 1985.
- Martin Jahn (born 1970), Czech politician and economist, Deputy Prime Minister for Economic Policy (2004–05). Graduated in 1994 with a Masters in International Trade.
- Petr Kellner (1964–2021), investor, businessman (one of the USD billionaires), and owner of PPF company.
- Václav Klaus (born 1941), President of the Czech Republic (2003–2013), Prime Minister of the Czech Republic (1992–97). Graduated in 1963 with a major in Foreign Trade Economics.
- Valtr Komárek (1930–2013), economist and politician
- Jiří Paroubek (born 1952), Prime Minister of the Czech Republic (2005–2006), Member of the Chamber of Deputies (2006–13), former chairman of Czech Social Democratic Party.
- Jiří Rusnok (born 1960), politician and economist, Prime Minister of the Czech Republic (2013–2014), Minister of Finance (2001–02), Minister of Industry and Trade (2002–03), graduated in 1984.
- Josef Tošovský (born 1950), Prime Minister of the Czech Republic (1997–1998), governor of the Czech National Bank (1989–1992; 1993–2000). Studied at the university from 1968 to 1973, graduated in Foreign Trade.
- Zdeněk Tůma (born 1960), governor of the Czech National Bank (2000–2010) and politician. Studied at the university from 1979–83.
- Miloš Zeman, Prime Minister of the Czech Republic (1998–2002), President of the Czech Republic (2013–2023). Studied from 1965–69 at the university, specialising in Economic Forecasting, and taught.
- Josef Zieleniec (born 1946), Minister of Foreign Affairs of the Czech Republic (1993–97), Member of the European Parliament (2004–09). Graduated in 1974, specialising in Industrial Economics.
- Laura Longauerová (born 1995), Slovak model and beauty pageant titleholder who won Miss Slovakia 2014 and Miss Universe Slovenskej Republiky 2019.
- Josef Průša (born 1990), Creator of Prusa Research.
- Josef Neumann (born 1974), General Director of PepsiCo for Czechia & Slovakia & Baltics & South East Europe Franchise
- Ondřej Bartoš (born 1975), venture capitalist and co-founder of Credo Ventures
- Simona Kijonková (born 1977), entrepreneur and founder of Packeta
