= 2022 Plzeň municipal election =

- 23 and 24 September 2022

All 47 seats in the Assembly 24 seats needed for a majority

	First party	Second party	Third party
Leader	David Šlouf	Roman Zarzycký	Jiří Klečka
Party	ODS	ANO	PRO Plzeň
Alliance	SPOLU
Last election	21 seats	13 seats	0 Seats
Seats won	15	15	5
Popular vote	583,397	573,678	206,355
Percentage	27.7%	27.3%	9.8%
	Fourth party	Fifth party	Sixth party
Leader	Pavel Bosák	Aleš Tolar	Jan Kůrka
Party	Pirates	STAN	Freedom and Direct Democracy
Last election	7 seats	–
Seats won	4	4	4
Popular vote	171,385	162,139	155,372
Percentage	8.1%	7.7%	7.4%
Mayor before election
Pavel Šindelář
ODS
Elected mayor
Roman Zarzycký
ANO

The 2022 Plzeň municipal election was held on 23 and 24 September 2022 as part of the nationwide municipal elections. The result was a narrow victory for Spolu which received highest number of votes but was tied with ANO 2011 by number of seats. After the election ANO 2011 formed coalition with Czech Pirate Party and Mayors and Independents with Roman Zarzycký as the new Mayor. New coalition was to be supported by 2 SPD members of the assembly but after disagreement of Piráti and STAN leadership they were replaced by PRO Plzeň.

== Background ==
Previous election was held in 2018. ANO 2011 has won the popular vote but tied with the Civic Democratic Party by number of seats. Coalition formed after the election was formed on 15 October 2018 consisting ANO 2011, Civic Democratic Party, TOP 09 and Czech Social Democratic Party. Martin Baxa became the new Mayor. On 17 January 2022 Baxa was replaced by Pavel Šindelář as Baxa became Minister of Culture. Šindelář decided to not run for second term. ODS, KDU-ČSL and TOP 09 decided to run under Spolu alliance banner with David Šlouf as electoral leader. Roman Zarzycký will lead ANO 2011.

== Opinion polls ==
Polling firm	Fieldwork date	Sample size	Turnout	SPOLU			ANO	Piráti	ČSSD	SPD	KSČM	STAN	For Plzeň	Oth.	Lead
Polling firm	Fieldwork date	Sample size	Turnout	ODS	TOP 09	KDU– ČSL	ANO	Piráti	ČSSD	SPD	KSČM	STAN	For Plzeň	Oth.	Lead
Sanep	11 - 20 August 2022			26.9			26.8	8.1	3.9	5.6	—N/a	6.4	4.2	16.3	0.1
Phoenix Research	20 July - 12 August 2022	1,016		25.4			28.4	9.6	4.5	5.7	—N/a	7.2	—N/a		3.0
Phoenix Research	20 June - 13 July 2022			28.6			27.9	8.0	3.7	5.4	1.6	7.3	—N/a	17.5	0.7
Phoenix Research	20 May - 13 June 2022	998		27.4			26.5	7.1	4.1	5.4	1.8	10.4	—N/a	17.3	0.9
Sanep	1-8 March 2022	5,116		23.6	7.1	5.7	20.4	6.2	5.0	5.3	—N/a	5.4	5.1	16.2	3.2
2018 election	5 and 6 October 2018		39.5	22.1	6.8	6.6	22.2	11.7	6.4	5.0	5.6	3.7	4.8	5.2	0.1

== Result ==
Party	Votes	%	Seats
Spolu	583,397	27.73	15
ANO 2011	573,678	27.26	15
For Plzeň	206,355	9.81	5
Czech Pirate Party	171,385	8.14	4
Mayors and Independents	162,139	7.71	4
Freedom and Direct Democracy	155,372	7.38	4
Communist Party of Bohemia and Moravia	69 031	3.28	0
Plzeň in Heart - ČSSD and independents	62,489	2.97	0
Law, Respect, Expertise	43,757	2.08	0
Přísaha	38,902	1.85	0
The Right Plzeň	15,155	0.72	0
Koruna Česká	9,050	0.43	0
Czech Plzeň and Safe Street	7,120	0.34	0
Democratic Party of Greens	6,359	0.30	0
