= Záblatí =

Záblatí may refer to places in the Czech Republic:

- Záblatí (Jindřichův Hradec District), a municipality and village in the South Bohemian Region
- Záblatí (Prachatice District), a municipality and village in the South Bohemian Region
- Záblatí (Žďár nad Sázavou District), a municipality and village in the Vysočina Region
- Záblatí (Bohumín), a village and part of Bohumín in the Moravian-Silesian Region
- Záblatí, a village and part of Dříteň in the South Bohemian Region
