= 2010 Plzeň municipal election =

← 2006	16–17 October 2010	2014 →

All 47 seats in the Assembly 23 seats needed for a majority
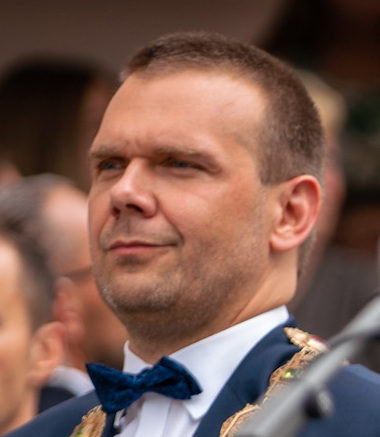

	First party	Second party	Third party
Leader	Martin Baxa	Eva Herinková	Ondřej Ženíšek
Party	ODS	ČSSD	TOP 09
Seats won	14	14	7
Popular vote	565,614	543,564	280,985
Percentage	24.8%	23.8%	12.3%
	Fourth party	Fifth party	Sixth party
Leader	Jiří Valenta	Pavel Rödl	Vladimír Duchek
Party	KSČM	Citizens.cz	PVP
Seats won	5	4	2
Popular vote	221,476	206,734	115,104
Percentage	9.7%	9.1%	5.0%
Mayor before election
Pavel Rödl
Independent
Elected mayor
Martin Baxa
ODS

Plzeň municipal election in 2010 was held as part of Czech municipal elections, 2010. It was held on 16 and 17 October 2010. The Civic Democratic Party has won the election ahead of the Czech Social Democratic Party. Both parties received 14 seats in 47-seat assembly and formed grand coalition. Martin Baxa became the new Mayor. The incumbent Mayor Pavel Rödl was a former member of ODS. He left the party prior election and contested as a leader of Citizens.cz.

== Results ==
Party	Votes	%	Seats
Civic Democratic Party	565,614	24.78	14
Czech Social Democratic Party	543,564	23.81	14
TOP 09	280,985	12.31	7
Communist Party of Bohemia and Moravia	221,476	9.70	5
Citizens.cz	206,734	9.06	5
Right Choice for Plzeň	115,104	5.04	2
Plzeň Alliance	102,860	4.51	0
KDU-ČSL	98,644	4.32	0
Public Affairs	60,762	2.66	0
Czech Sovereignty	47,184	2.07	0
Czech Pirate Party	18,733	0.82	0
Party of Civic Rights	14,336	0.63	0
Workers' Party	4,321	0.19	0
Right Bloc	1,472	0.06	0
Balbín's Poetic Party	907	0.04	0
Total	2,282,696	100.00	47
