= 2022 Brno municipal election =

- 23 and 24 September 2022

All 55 seats in the Assembly 28 seats needed for a majority
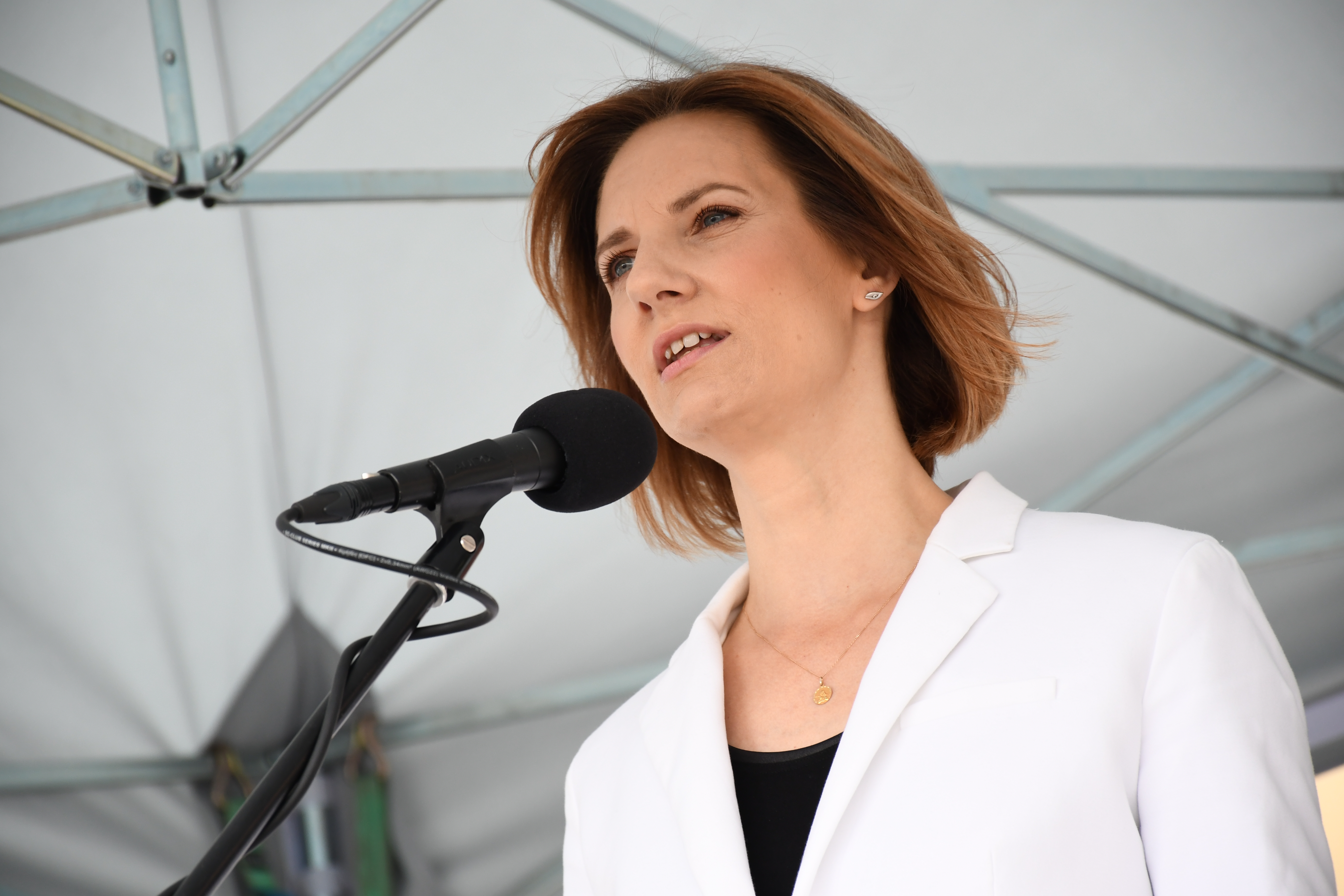

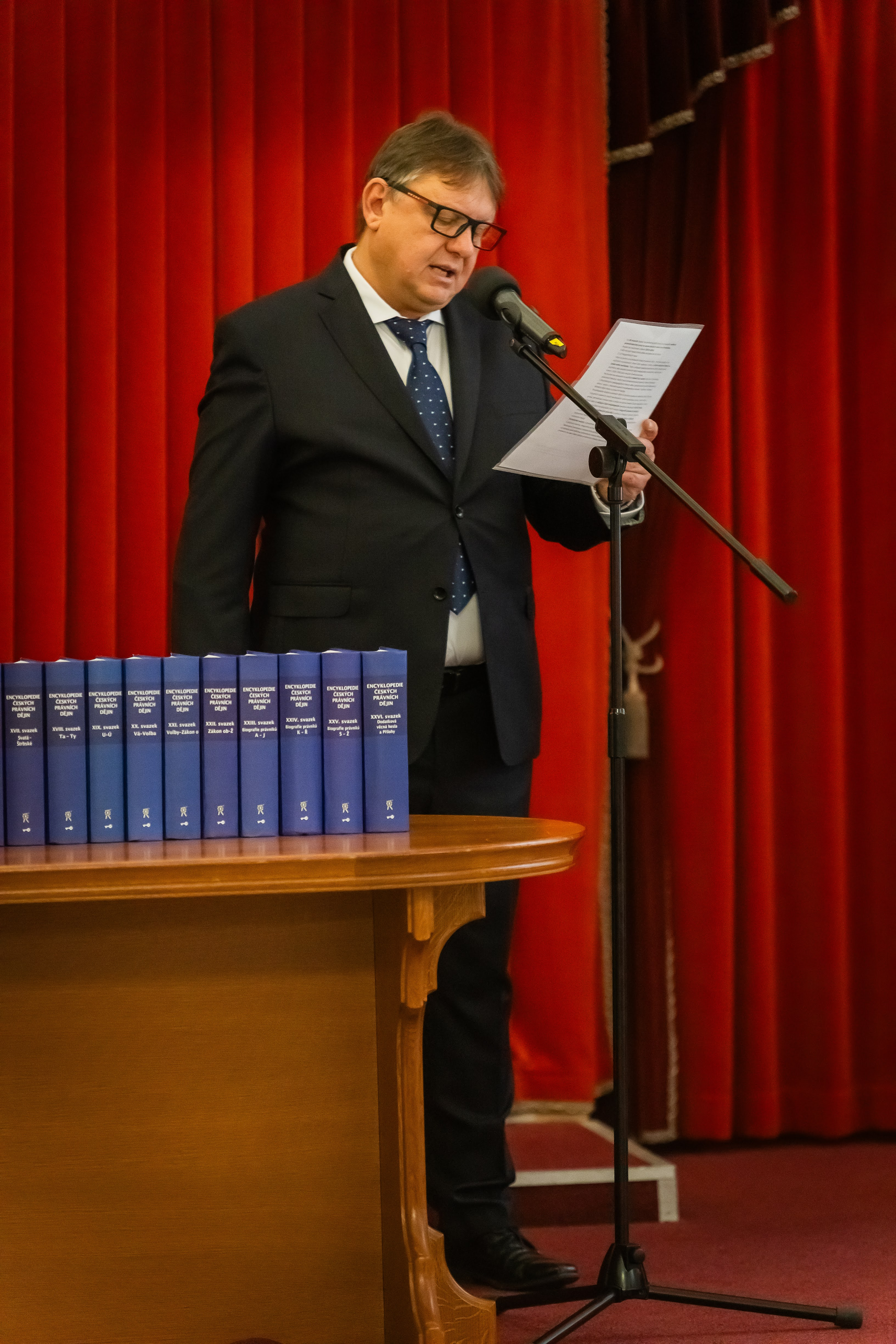

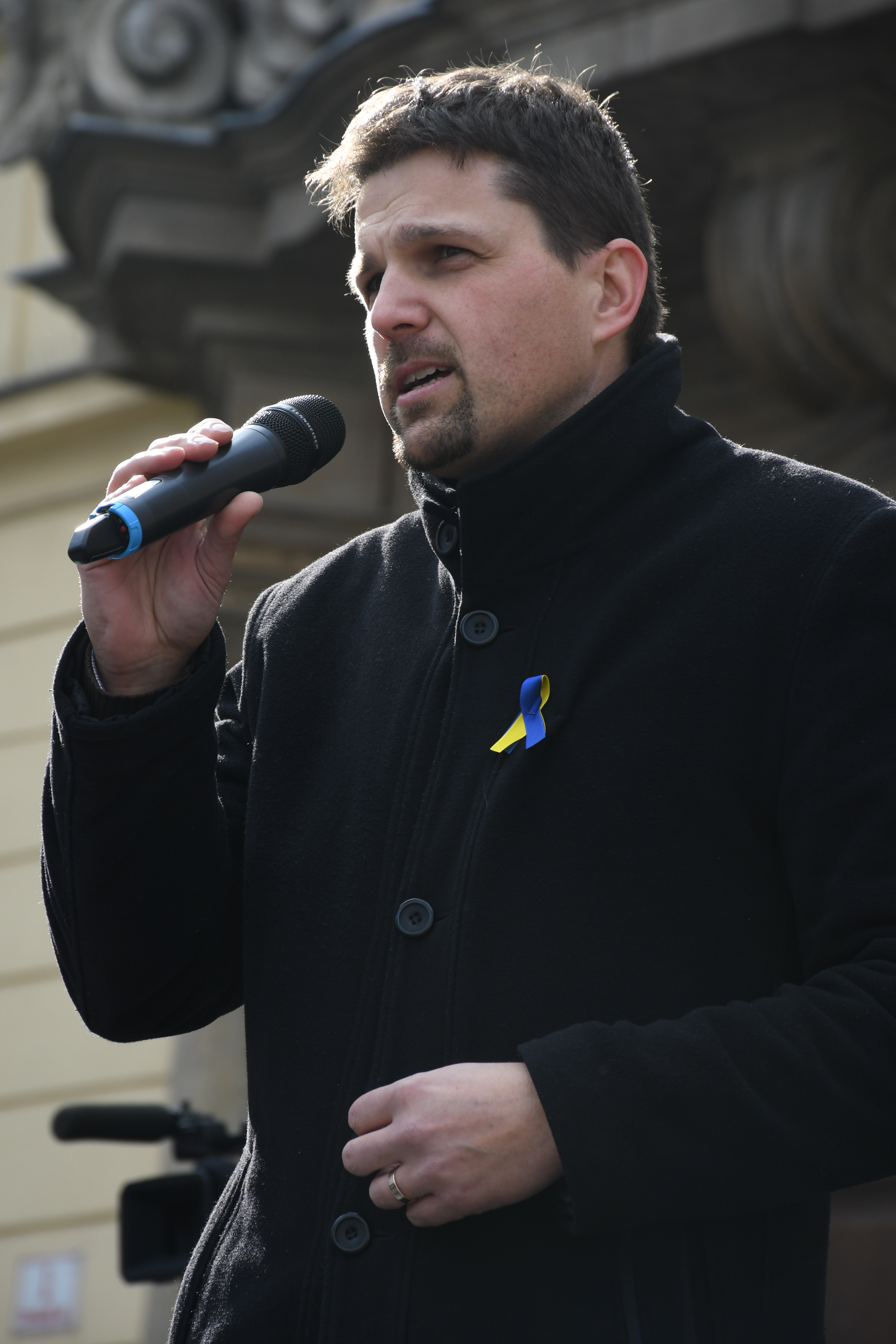

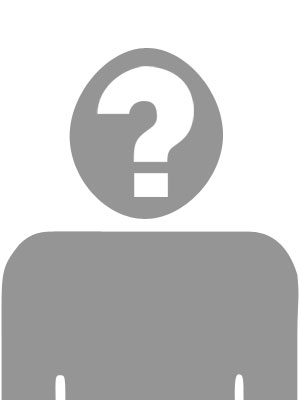

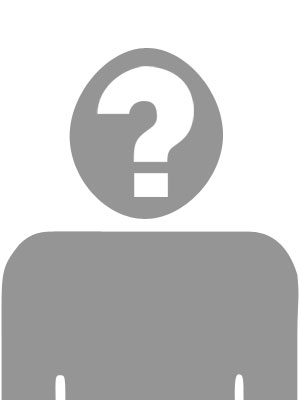

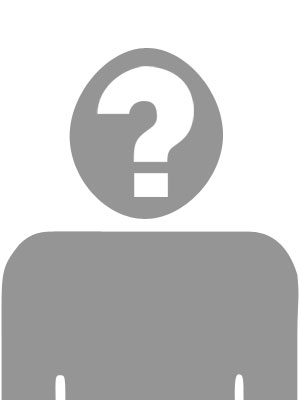

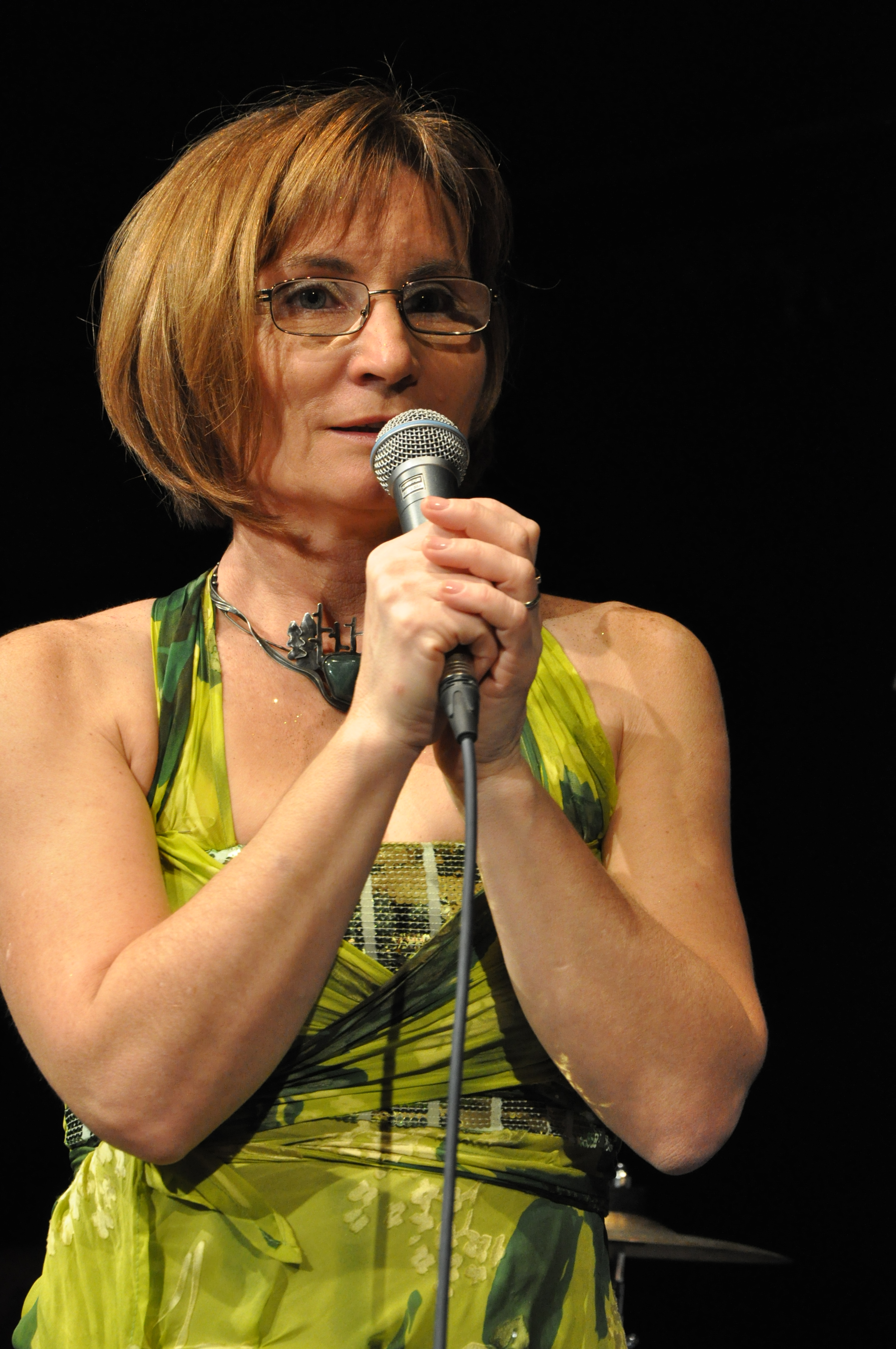
	First party	Second party	Third party
Leader	Markéta Vaňková	René Černý	Petr Hladík
Party	ODS	ANO	Christian and Democratic Union – Czechoslovak People's Party
Alliance	ODS-TOP 09		KDU-ČSL-STAN
Last election	14 seats, 21.97%	18 seats, 23.03%	8 seats, 14.53%
Seats won	16	13	10
Popular vote	1,549,837	1,267,461	1,059,032
Percentage	25.0%	20.5%	17.1%
	Fourth party	Fifth party	Sixth party
Leader	Ivan Fencl	Marek Lahoda	Jiří Oliva
Party	SPD	Pirates	ČSSD
Last election	4 seats, 5.07%	6 seats, 8.74%	5 seats, 6.28%
Seats won	6	4	3
Popular vote	605,982	437,910	378,091
Percentage	9.8%	7.1%	6.1%
	Seventh party
Leader	Jana Drápalová
Party	Greens
Seats won	3
Popular vote	369,539
Percentage	6.0%
Mayor before election
Markéta Vaňková
Civic Democratic Party
Elected mayor
Markéta Vaňková
Civic Democratic Party

The 2022 Brno municipal election was held on 23 and 24 September 2022 as part of the nationwide municipal elections. Coalition of Civic Democratic Party and TOP 09 led by incumbent Mayor Markéta Vaňková has won the election. Following election ODS and TOP 09 formed wide coalition with ANO 2011, KDU-ČSL, STAN, Pirates and ČSSD. Markéta Vaňková is set to continue as Mayor.

== Background ==
2018 election was won by ANO 2011 ahead of ODS. Markéta Vaňková, candidate of ODS became new Mayor while ANO 2011 remained in opposition. Vaňková is running for reelection as the leader of ODS and TOP 09 alliance. KDU-ČSL formed electoral alliance with STAN. Petr Hladík is electoral leader of this alliance. On 26 January 2022 René Černý was announced as leader of ANO 2011.

== Opinion polls ==
Polling firm	Fieldwork date	Sample size	Turnout	ANO	ODS	TOP 09	KDU– ČSL	STAN	Piráti	ČSSD	SPD	Zelení	Žít Brno	KSČM	Brno+	Oth.	Lead			
Polling firm	Fieldwork date	Sample size	Turnout	Masaryk university	Exit poll			14-17	25-30		15-20		5-10	5-10	5-10	5-10		N/A	N/A	5-15
Sanep	11 - 20 August 2022			21.7	24.8		6.4		8.9	5.8	5.6	4.3		N/A	N/A	22.5	3.1			
Phoenix Research	20 July - 12 August 2022	1,016		21.2	25.3		6.3		10.3	5.6	5.1	4.6		N/A	N/A		4.1			
Phoenix Research	20 June - 13 July 2022			19.8	28.2		6.8		9.1	5.8	5.7	5.1		1.8	5.1	12.6	8.4			
Phoenix Research	20 May - 13 June 2022	998		19.4	26.5		10.2		8.3	5.4	5.9	5.4		1.9	4.9		7.1			
Sanep	1-8 March 2022	5,116	47.8	21.5	20.1	3.6	11.3	5.8	4.9	—N/a	6.2	—N/a	—N/a	—N/a	—N/a	26.6	1.4			
2018 election	5 and 6 October 2018			23.0	18.6	3.4	10.3	4.3	8.7	6.3	5.1	4.5	4.1	4.1	2.7		4.4			

== Result ==
Party	Votes	%	Seats
ODS-TOP 09	1,549,837	25.03	16
ANO 2011	1,267,461	20.47	13
KDU-ČSL-STAN	1,059,032	17.10	10
SPD-Tricolour-Moravané-Independents	605,982	9.79	6
Czech Pirate Party	437,910	7.07	4
ČSSD your Mayors	378,091	6.11	3
Zelení and Žít Brno supported by Idealists	369,539	5.97	3
Fakt Brno	157,120	2.54	0
Přísaha	118,243	1.91	0
Brno Plus and Svobodní	102,015	1.65	0
Restart for Brno	89,436	1.44	0
B3	56,224	0.91	0
Democratic Party of Greens	1,193	0.02	0
Are you FOR?	683	0.01	0
