= 2018 Plzeň municipal election =

- 5 and 6 October 2018

All 47 seats in the Assembly 24 seats needed for a majority

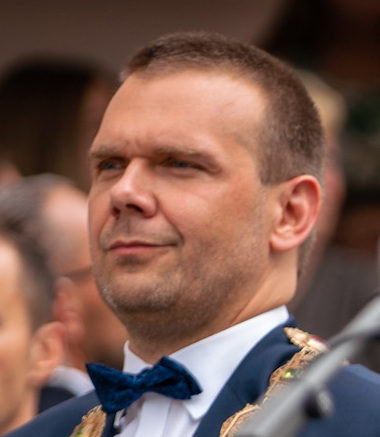

	First party	Second party	Third party
Leader	Roman Zarzycký	Martin Baxa	Pavel Bosák
Party	ANO	ODS	Pirates
Seats won	13	13	7
Popular vote	488,324	486,401	257,260
Percentage	22.2%	22.1%	11.7%
	Fourth party	Fifth party	Sixth party
Leader	Michal Vozobule	Petr Náhlík	Martin Zrzavecký
Party	TOP 09	Christian and Democratic Union – Czechoslovak People's Party	ČSSD
Seats won	4	4	3
Popular vote	150,150	144,203	141,073
Percentage	6.8%	6.6%	6.4%
	Seventh party
Leader	Václav Štekl
Party	KSČM
Seats won	3
Popular vote	124,055
Percentage	5.6%
Mayor before election
Martin Zrzavecký
ČSSD
Elected mayor
Martin Baxa
ODS

The Plzeň municipal election in 2018 was held as part of 2018 Czech municipal elections on 5 and 6 October 2018. Plzeň was led by a coalition of the Civic Democratic Party, Czech Social Democratic Party, Christian and Democratic Union – Czechoslovak People's Party and Citizens Patriots. ANO 2011 was the strongest opposition party. ANO 2011 has won the popular vote but tied with the Civic Democratic Party by number of seats. Coalition formed after the election was formed on 15 October 2018 consisting ANO 2011, Civic Democratic Party, TOP 09 and Czech Social Democratic Party. Martin Baxa became the new Mayor.

== Background ==
The previous election was held in 2014. ANO 2011 tied with the Civic Democratic Party (ODS) and Czech Social Democratic Party (ČSSD). ODS and ČSSD then formed a coalition and Martin Zrzavecký became the new Mayor. ANO 2011 remained in opposition. The coalition between ODS and ČSSD also included Citizens Patriots (OPAT) and Christian and Democratic Union – Czechoslovak People's Party (KDU–ČSL). The leader of local ANO 2011 Pavel Šrámek resigned his positions in regional organisation following the election.

The Czech Pirate Party was the first party to introduce its leader. Pavel Bosák won the party's primaries and became candidate for Mayor. Bosák stated that he wants to thank pirates for his chance and that he wants to introduce his vision for the city to its citizens. Bosák isn't a member of the party.

The first opinion poll was published on 24 April 2018. Seven parties would be elected to assembly. ANO 2011 would receive 24% of votes and while the Civic Democratic Party would receive 12.7% of votes. The Pirate party would come third with 10%. The Social Democratic Party would be fourth with 9.6%. TOP 09 and The Communist Party would both receive 7%. Far-right Freedom and Direct Democracy would receive 8%.

Roman zarzycký became nominee of ANO 2011 for the position of Mayor. ODS decided to nominate Martin Baxa.

== Current composition of assembly ==
Party	Seats
ANO 2011	10
Civic Democratic Party	10
Czech Social Democratic Party	10
TOP 09	5
Communist Party of Bohemia and Moravia	5
Citizens Patriots	4
Christian and Democratic Union - Czechoslovak People's Party	3

== Opinion polls ==
Date	Company	ANO 2011	ODS	ČSSD	TOP 09	KSČM	OPAT	KDU ČSL	Piráti	SPD	others
12 Sep 2018	Sanep	16.2	12.1	4.8	2.1	4.2	2.2	2.2	4.3	5.9	
22 Jun 2018	Phoenix Research	22.6	14.1	8.2	6.2	6.0	N/A	5.0	12.2	6.6	13.4
1 - 10 Jun 2018	Sanep	24.3	18.3	8.3	8.4	6.5	4.0	3.0	13.7	10.5	3.0
22 Mar - 13 Apr 2018	Phoenix Research	24.0	12.7	9.6	7.0	7.1	N/A	4.0	10.0	8.0	17.6

== Result ==
Party	Leader	Votes	%	Seats
ANO 2011 (ANO)	Roman Zarzycký	488,324	22.20	13
Civic Democratic Party (ODS)	Martin Baxa	486,401	22.11	13
Czech Pirate Party (Piráti)	Pavel Bosák	257,260	11.69	7
TOP 09	Michal Vozobule	150,150	6.83	4
Christian and Democratic Union – Czechoslovak People's Party	Petr Náhlík	144,203	6.56	4
Czech Social Democratic Party (ČSSD)	Martin Zrzavecký	141,073	6.41	3
Communist Party of Bohemia and Moravia (KSČM)	Václav Štekl	124,055	5.64	3
Freedom and Direct Democracy (SPD)	Jana Levová	108,882	4.95	0
For Health	Irena Vítkovcová	105,272	4.79	0
Patriots and Mayors	Václav Chaloupek	80,381	3.65	0
New Plzeň	Jiří Strobach	60,597	2.75	0
Public Interests of Plzeň	Václav Ženíšek	19,337	0.88	0
Koruna Česká	Luděk Krčmář	13,486	0.61	0
Czech Plzeň	Jiří Štěpánek	10,589	0.48	0
Freeholder Party of the Czech Republic (SsČR)	Petr Pohl	8,549	0.39	0
Democratic Green Party	Zdeněk Legát	1,328	0.06	0
Total		2,199,887	100	47
