= 2002 Plzeň municipal election =

← 1998	1–2 November 2002	2006 →

All 47 seats in the Assembly 23 seats needed for a majority

	First party	Second party	Third party
Leader	Jiří Šneberger	Jiří Bis	Jana Bystřická
Party	ODS	ČSSD	KSČM
Seats won	20	10	7
Popular vote	743,089	403,889	260,123
Percentage	37.9%	20.6%	13.3%
	Fourth party	Fifth party	Sixth party
Leader	Vladimír Duchek	Petr Náhlík	Miroslav Zábranský
Party	PVP	Lidovci	US–DEU–SNK
Seats won	4	3	3
Popular vote	183,245	145,680	118,713
Percentage	9.3%	7.4%	6.1%
Mayor before election
Jiří Šneberger
ODS
Elected mayor
Jiří Šneberger
ODS

Plzeň municipal election in 2002 was held as part of Czech municipal elections, 2002. It was held on 1 and 2 November 2002. The Civic Democratic Party won the election with 38% of the votes. The incumbent Mayor Jiří Šneberger was reelected.

== Results ==
Party	Votes	%	Seats
Civic Democratic Party	743,089	37.89	20
Czech Social Democratic Party	403,889	20.59	10
Communist Party of Bohemia and Moravia	260,123	13.26	7
Right Choice for Plzeň	183,245	9.34	4
Christian and Democratic Union – Czechoslovak People's Party	145,680	7.43	3
Freedom Union – Democratic Union–Association of independent Candidates	118,713	6.05	3
Green Party	71,830	3.66	0
Civic Democratic Alliance	26,005	1.33	0
Party for Secure Life	8,820	0.45	0
Total	1,961,394	100	47

== Aftermath ==
Šneberger became the mayor. He himself stated that it would be his last term. He left the office in 2002 when he was elected a Senator. Šeberger was replaced by Miroslav Kalous.
