= 2006 Plzeň municipal election =

2006 Czech municipal elections

← 2002	20–21 October 2006	2010 →

All 47 seats in the Assembly 23 seats needed for a majority

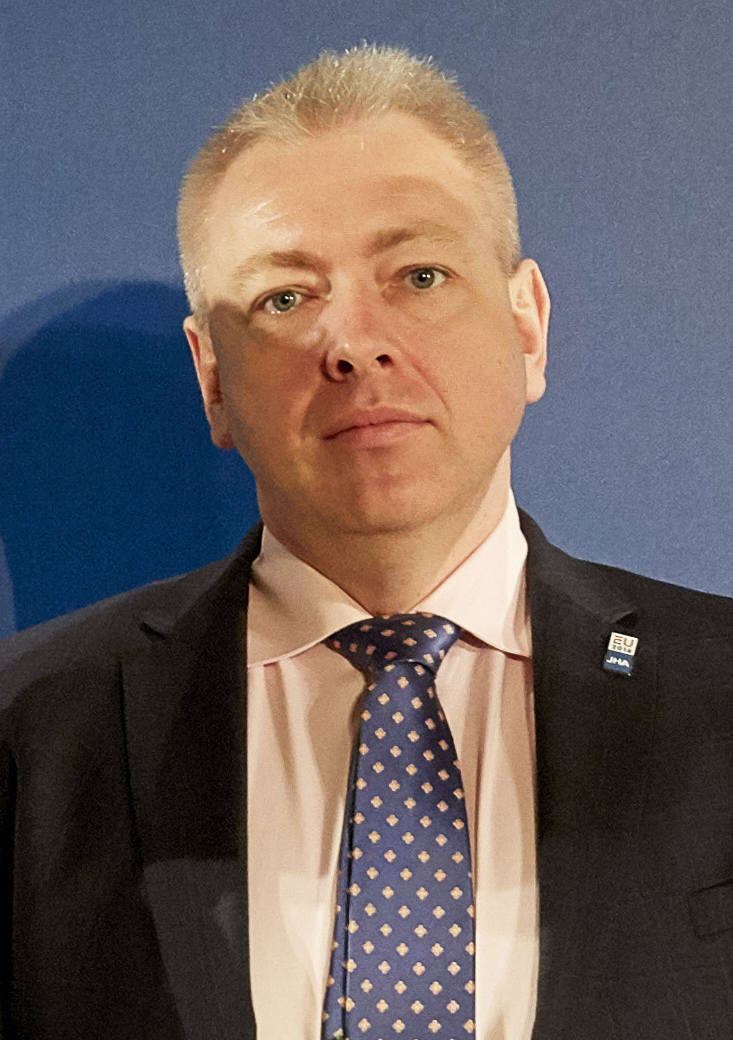

	First party	Second party	Third party
Leader	Pavel Rödl	Milan Chovanec	František Hrubeš
Party	ODS	ČSSD	KSČM
Seats won	22	10	6
Popular vote	1,007,049	451,520	277,883
Percentage	45.2%	20.3%	12.5%
	Fourth party	Fifth party	Sixth party
Leader	Vladimír Duchek	Miroslav Zábranský	Petr Náhlík
Party	PVP	PA	Lidovci
Seats won	3	3	3
Popular vote	177,562	168,750	141,259
Percentage	8.0%	7.6%	6.4%
Mayor before election
Miroslav Kalous
ODS
Elected mayor
Pavel Rödl
ODS

The Plzeň municipal election of 2006 was held as a part of Czech municipal elections, 2006. It was held on 20 and 21 October 2006. The Civic Democratic Party (ODS) won the election with 45% of the votes. Pavel Rödl then became the new Mayor when ODS formed a coalition with the Christian and Democratic Union – Czechoslovak People's Party (KDU-ČSL) and the Right Choice for Plzeň (PVP). The incumbent Mayor, Miroslav Kalous, didn't participate in the election.

== Campaign ==
Seven parties contested the election. ODS and ČSSD were the main contesting parties. ODS was led by Pavel Rödl while ČSSD was led by Milan Chovanec.

== Results ==
Party	Votes	%	Seats
Civic Democratic Party	1,007,049	45.23	22
Czech Social Democratic Party	451,520	20.28	10
Communist Party of Bohemia and Moravia	277,883	12.48	6
Right Choice for Plzeň	177,562	7.98	3
Plzeň Alliance	168,750	7.58	3
Christian and Democratic Union – Czechoslovak People's Party	141,259	6.35	3
Koruna Česká	2,263	0.10	0
Total	2,226,286	100	47
