= 2018 Brno municipal election =

- 5 and 6 October 2018

All 65seats in the Assembly 33 seats needed for a majority
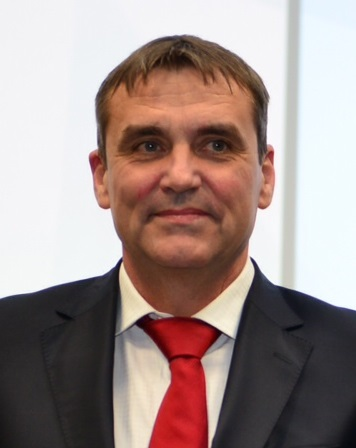

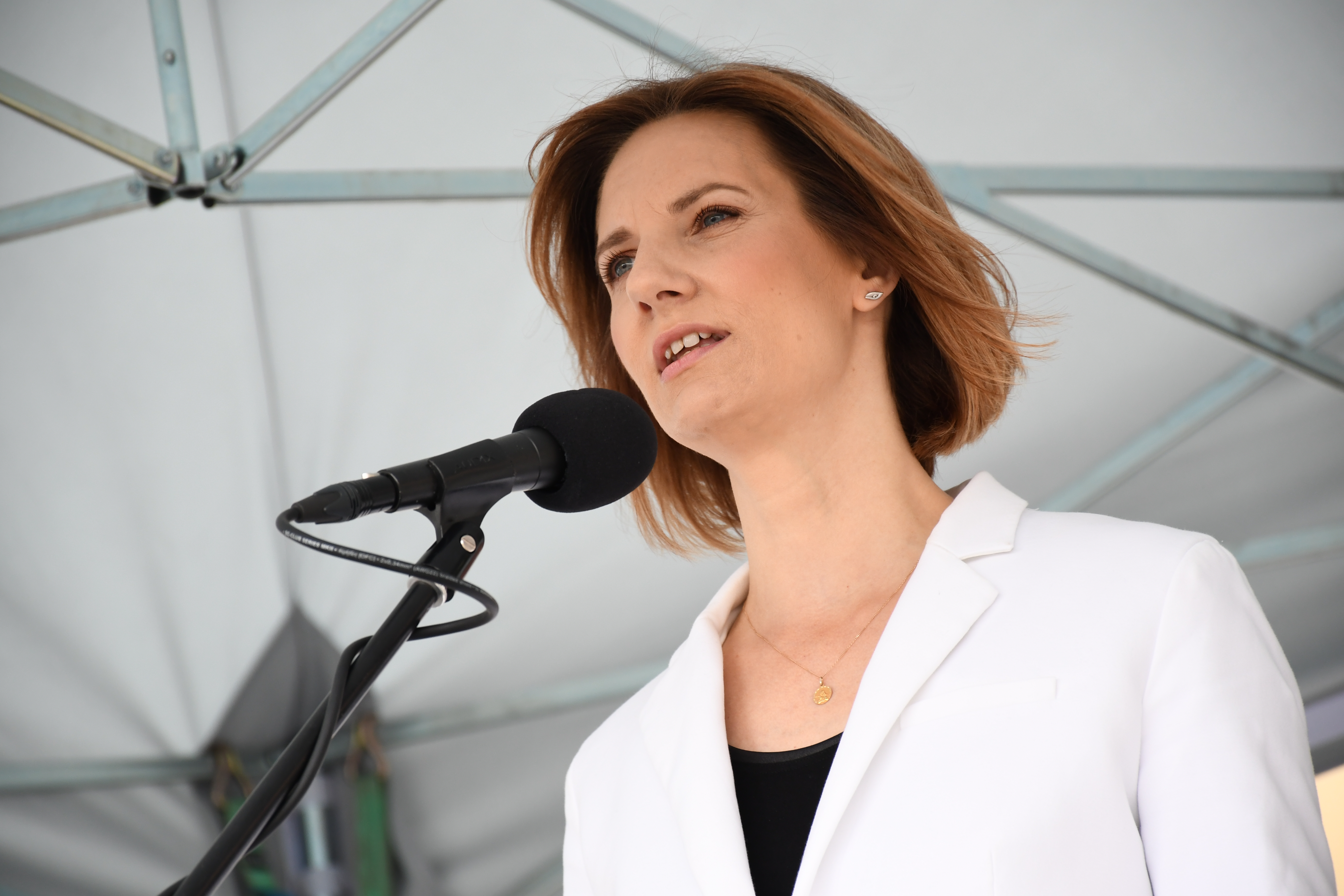

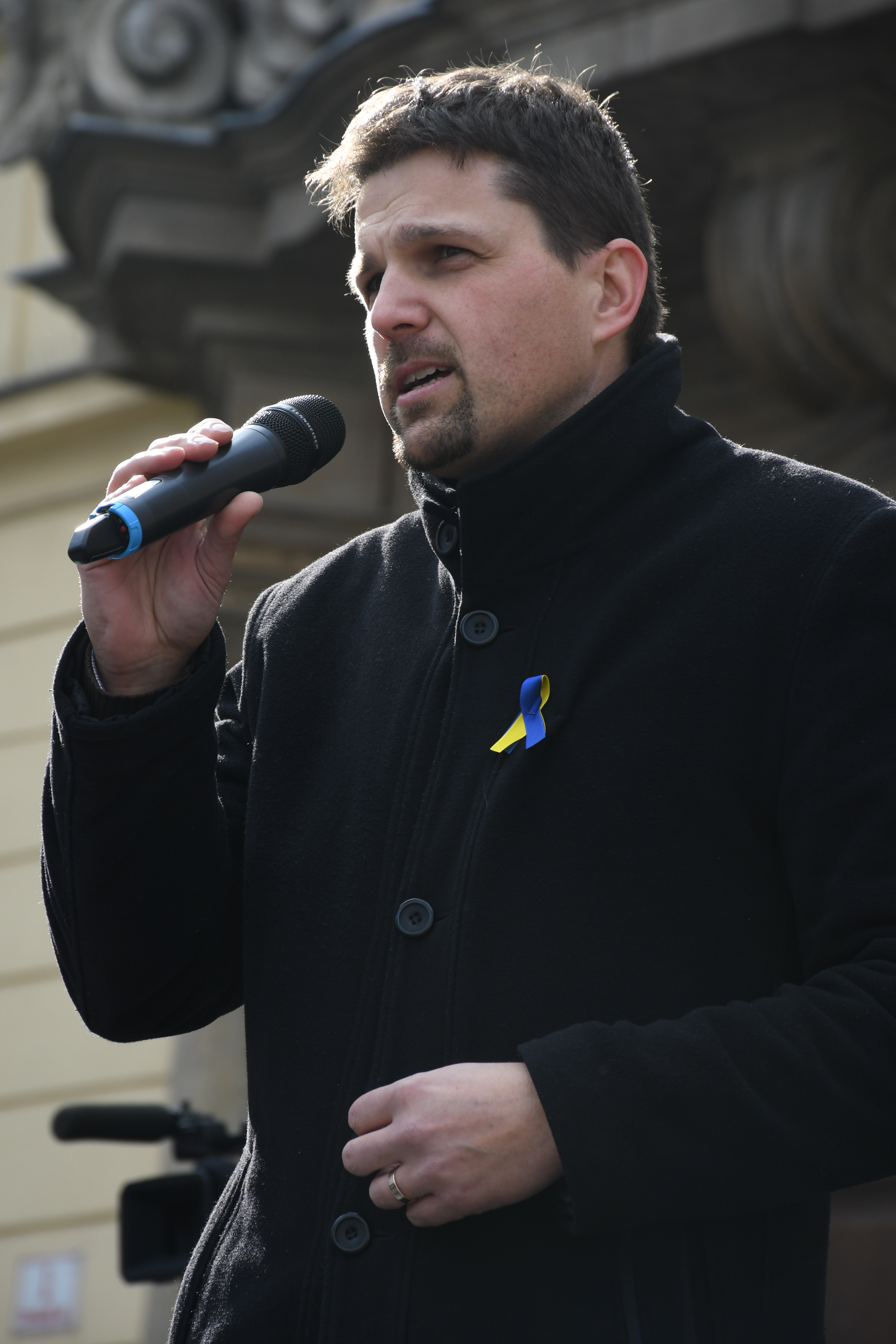

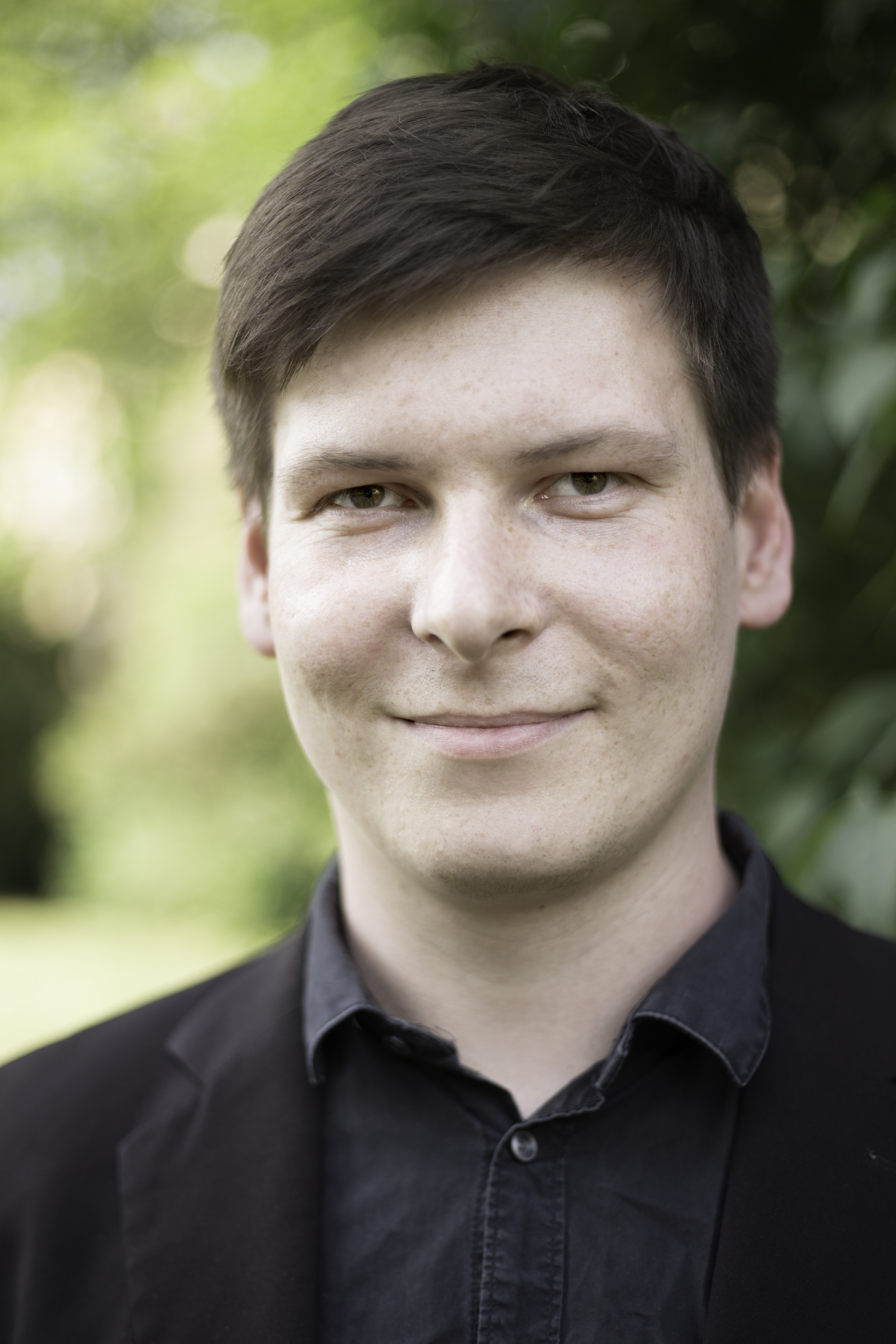

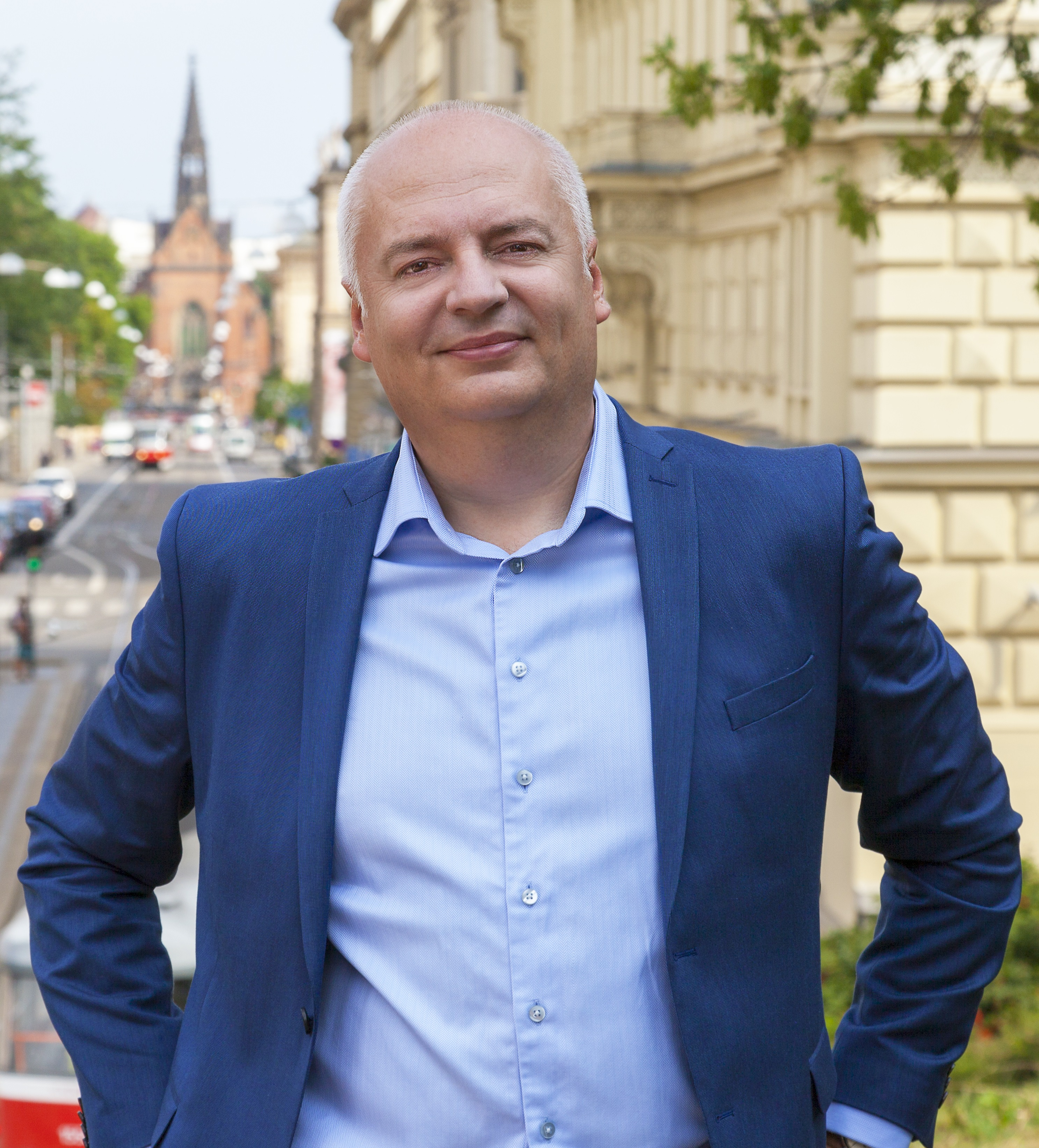

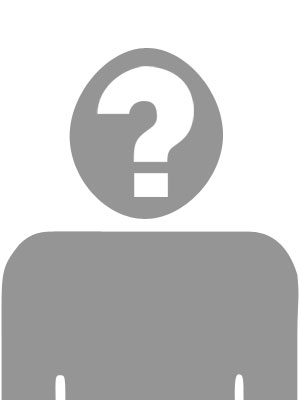
	First party	Second party	Third party
Leader	Petr Vokřál	Markéta Vaňková	Petr Hladík
Party	ANO	ODS	Christian and Democratic Union – Czechoslovak People's Party
Last election	13	5	7
Seats won	18	14	8
Popular vote	1,474,746	1,188,120	656,656
Percentage	23.03%	18.55%	10.25%
	Fourth party	Fifth party	Sixth party
Leader	Tomáš Koláčný	Oliver Pospíšil	Ivan Fencl
Party	Pirates	ČSSD	SPD
Last election	8	11	new
Seats won	6	5	4
Popular vote	559,399	402,425	324.906
Percentage	8.74%	6.28%	5.07%
Mayor before election
Petr Vokřál
ANO 2011
Elected mayor
Markéta Vaňková
Civic Democratic Party

Brno municipal election in 2018 was held as part of 2018 Czech municipal elections. ANO 2011 led by incumbent Mayor Petr Vokřál received highest number of votes being followed by Civic Democratic Party (ODS). ODS formed coalition with KDU-ČSL, ČSSD and Pirates after the election. Markéta Vaňková of ODS became the new Mayor.

== Background ==
Previous election was held in 2014. It was a victory for ANO 2011. A protest party called Žít Brno was also successful. Žít Brno is inspired by Icelandic Best Party. ANO formed a coalition with Žít Brno, Green Party and Christian and Democratic Union – Czechoslovak People's Party. Petr Vokřál from ANO became Mayor of Brno.

Žít Brno decided to not participate in the 2018 election. Its members instead sought nomination from Czech Pirate Party. The Pirates nominated Tomáš Koláčný as its leader. Only one member of Žít Brno received nomination from Pirate Party.

The Civic Democratic Party announced on 24 April 2018 that it will participate election with support of Party of Free Citizens. Markéta Vaňková became candidate for Mayor. Party launched its campaign along with the announcement. Vaňková stated that she isn't satisfied with the current political development in Brno. She criticised ruling coalition for stagnation. She noted that many projects started by previous coalition aren't finished yet.

== Current composition of assembly ==
Party	Seats
ANO 2011	13
Czech Social Democratic Party	11
Žít Brno with support of Pirates	8
Christian and Democratic Union - Czechoslovak People's Party	7
Civic Democratic Party	5
Green Party	4
Communist Party of Bohemia and Moravia	4
TOP 09	4

== Opinion polls ==
Date	Company	ANO 2011	ČSSD	Piráti	KDU ČSL	ODS	Zelení	KSČM	TOP 09	SPD	others
Exit poll	Masaryk University	20.0	7.0	8.0	14.0	22.0	4.5	3.0	4.5	3.5	
12 Sep 2018	Sanep	16.8	3.8	7.2	5.2	11.6	1.5	3.1	2.2	5.9	
22 Jun 2018	Phoenix Research	19.4	6.2	10.5	8.8	15.2	—N/a	4.2	4.1	8.6	15.0
1 - 10 Jun 2018	Sanep	22.7	6.2	12.9	7.5	15.7	3.2	5.2	5.3	11.8	9.5
22 Mar - 13 Apr 2018	Phoenix Research	22.0	6.4	8.5	7.7	14.0	—N/a	4.7	5.2	9.7	21.8
1 - 11 Oct 2014	2014 Election	19.9	17.7	11.9	11.8	7.6	7.4	6.7	6.6	—N/a	

== Result ==
Party	Votes	%	Seats
ANO 2011	1,474,746	23.03	18
Civic Democratic Party	1,188,120	18.55	14
KDU-ČSL	656,656	10.25	8
Czech Pirate Party	559,399	8.74	6
Czech Social Democratic Party	402,425	6.28	5
Freedom and Direct Democracy	402,425	5.07	4
Green Party	289,470	4.52	0
Mayors and Independents	274,069	4.28	0
Communist Party of Bohemia and Moravia	264,705	4.13	0
Žít Brno	261,721	4.09	0
TOP 09	218,962	3.42	0
SLUŠNÍ LIDÉ A SOUKROMNÍCI	174,324	2.72	0
Brno Plus	169,729	2.65	0
SMART MORAVSKÁ METROPOLE	42,869	0.67	0
MAFFIE.cz Hoď sem velké křížek pro betelné ŠTATL, zaslouží si to!	27,327	0.43	0
Nezávislí kandidáti společně pro město BRNO, bezpečnost, dostupné bydlení a dopravu vyřešíme a víme jak na to	25,533	0.40	0
Brno Seniors	19,091	0.30	0
Sportsmen	17,606	0.27	0
Moravané	10,489	0.16	0
ZVÍŘATA JSOU MŮJ ŽIVOT	854	0.01	0
Roma Democratic Party	566	0.01	0
JAUNER Czechoslovakia 2018	43	0	0
