= 2014 Brno municipal election =

- 10–11 October 2014

All 55 seats in the Assembly 28 seats needed for a majority
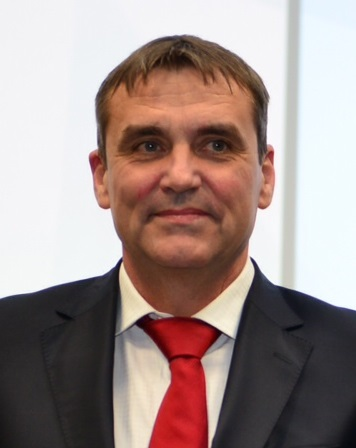

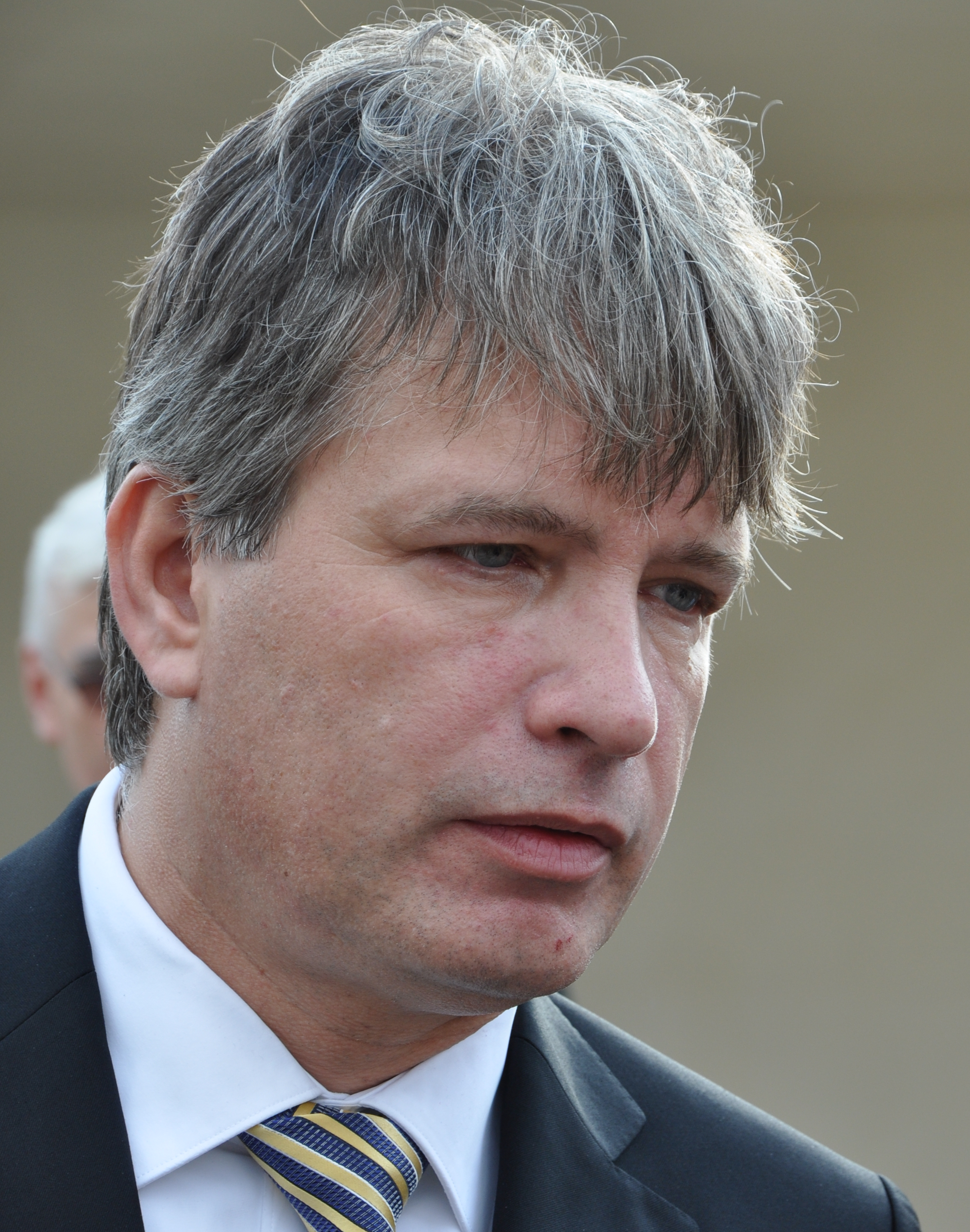

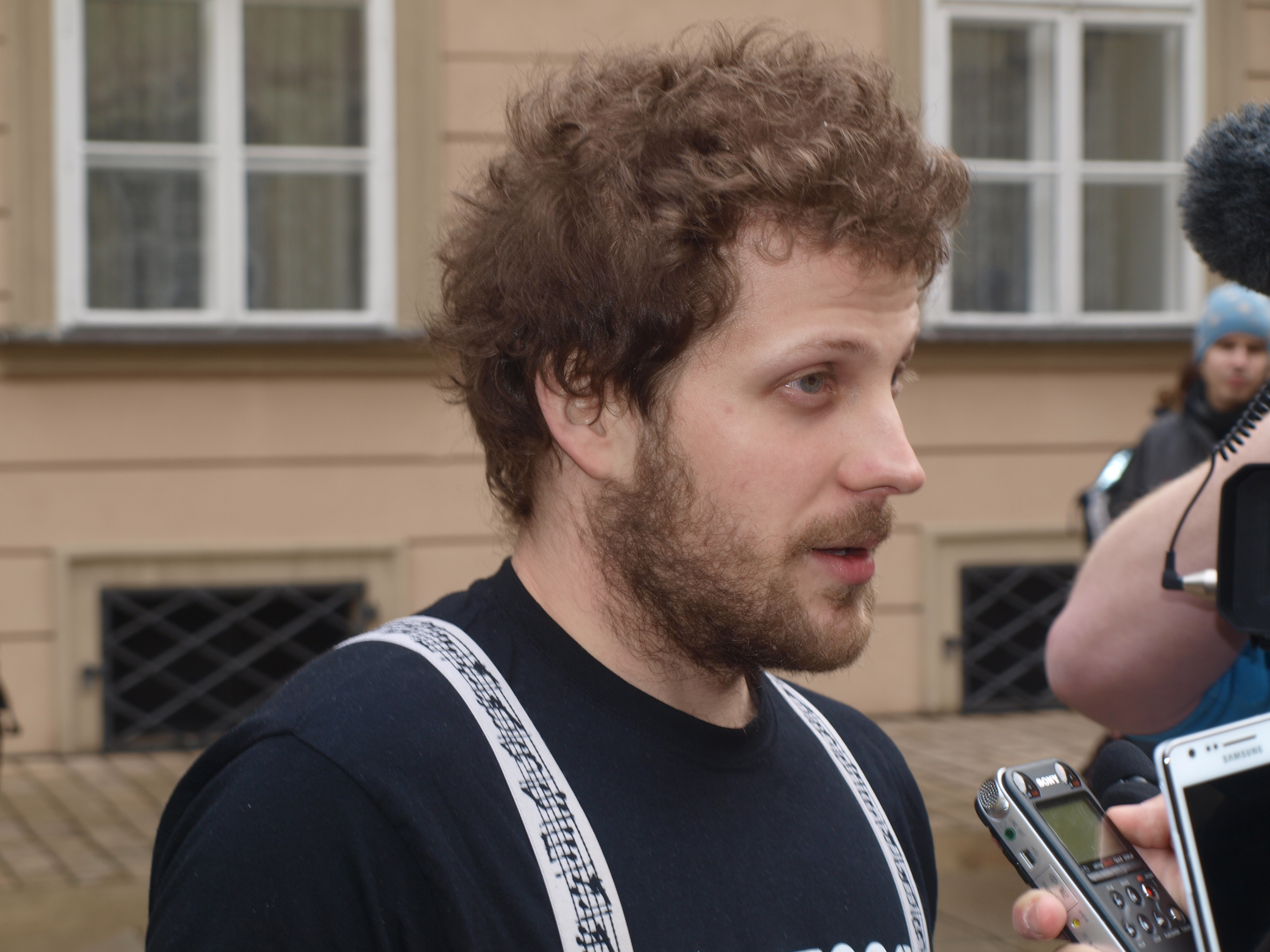

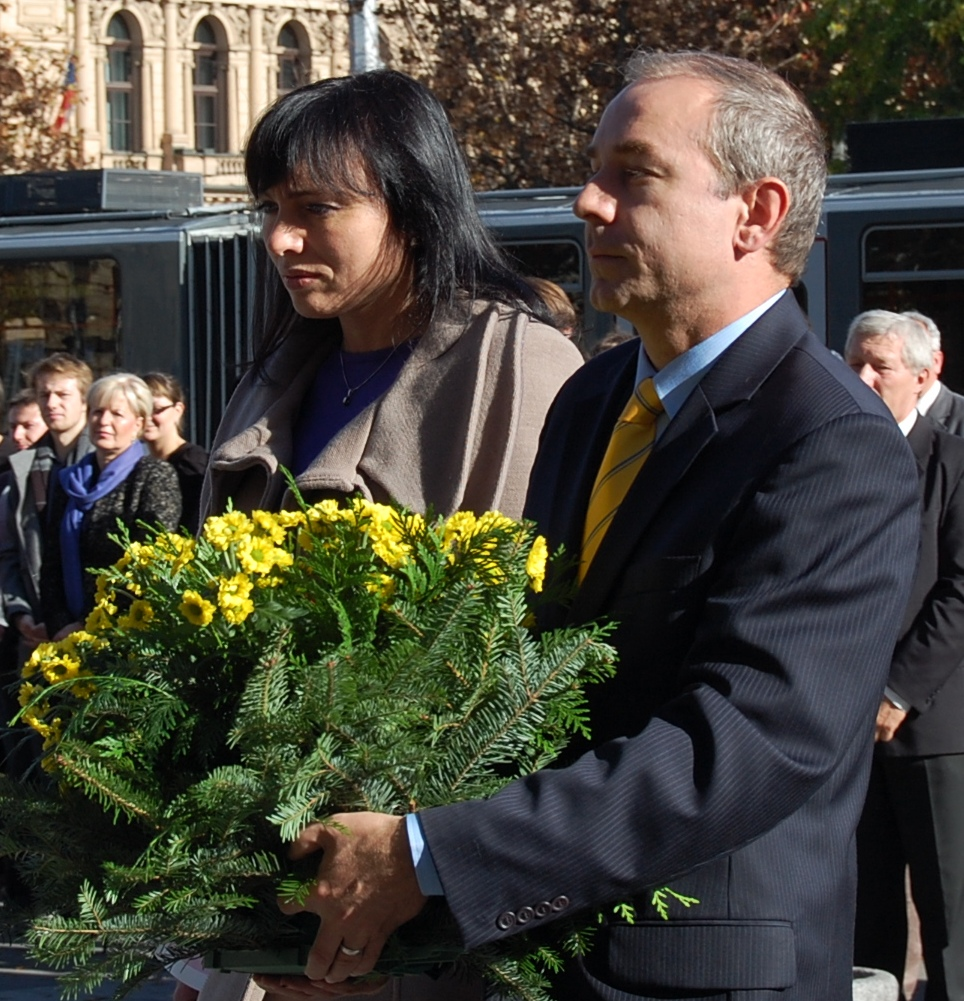

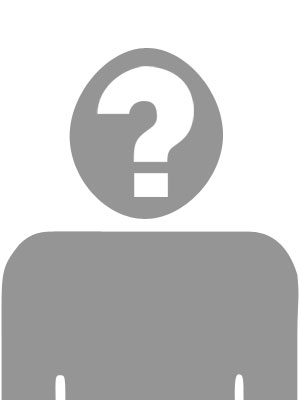

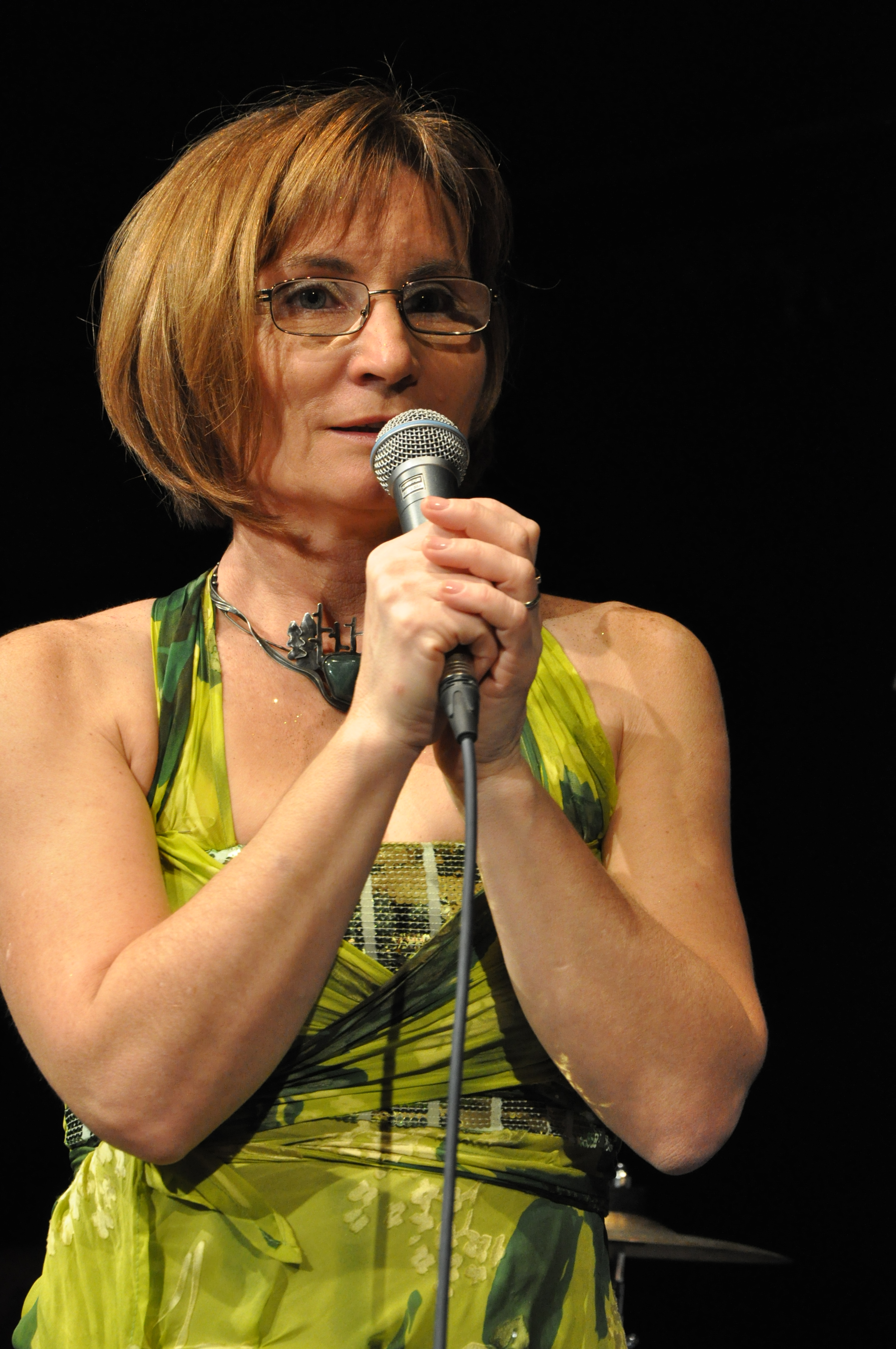
	First party	Second party	Third party
Leader	Petr Vokřál	Roman Onderka	Matěj Hollan
Party	ANO	ČSSD	Žít Brno
Seats won	13	11	8
Popular vote	1,175,204	1,042,210	700,919
Percentage	19.9%	17.7%	11.9%
	Fourth party	Fifth party	Sixth party
Leader	Klára Liptáková	František Vižďa	Jana Drápalová
Party	Christian and Democratic Union – Czechoslovak People's Party	ODS	Greens
Seats won	7	5	4
Popular vote	697,671	449,33	435,168
Percentage	11.8%	7.6%	7.4%
Mayor before election
Roman Onderka
ČSSD
Elected mayor
Petr vokřál
ANO 2011

Brno municipal election in 2014 was held as part of 2014 Czech municipal elections. It was held on 10 and 11 October 2014. 55 Members of Assembly were elected. Election was a victory for ANO 2011. A protest party called Žít Brno was also successful. Žít Brno is inspired by Icelandic Best Party.

ANO formed a coalition with Žít Brno, the Green Party and Christian and Democratic Union – Czechoslovak People's Party. Petr Vokřál became Mayor of Brno.

== Results ==
Party	Votes	%	Seats
ANO 2011	1,175,204	19.93	13
Czech Social Democratic Party	1,042,210	17.67	11
Žít Brno with support of Pirates	700,919	11.89	7
Christian and Democratic Union – Czechoslovak People's Party	697,671	11.83	7
Civic Democratic Party	449,330	7.62	5
Green Party	435,168	7.38	4
Communist Party of Bohemia and Moravia	396,657	6.73	4
TOP 09	387,462	6.57	4
What about Brno?	212,134	3.60	0
Party of Free Citizens	141,827	2.41	0
Mayors and Independents	79,597	1.35	0
Association Moravans for Brno	79,116	1.34	0
Dawn of Direct Democracy	70,850	1.20	0
Workers' Party	11,480	0.19	0
Coalition Republic for Brno	10,988	0.19	0
Conservative Party	5,283	0.09	0
Antibursík	837	0.01	0
