= Záblatí (Žďár nad Sázavou District) =

- Municipality
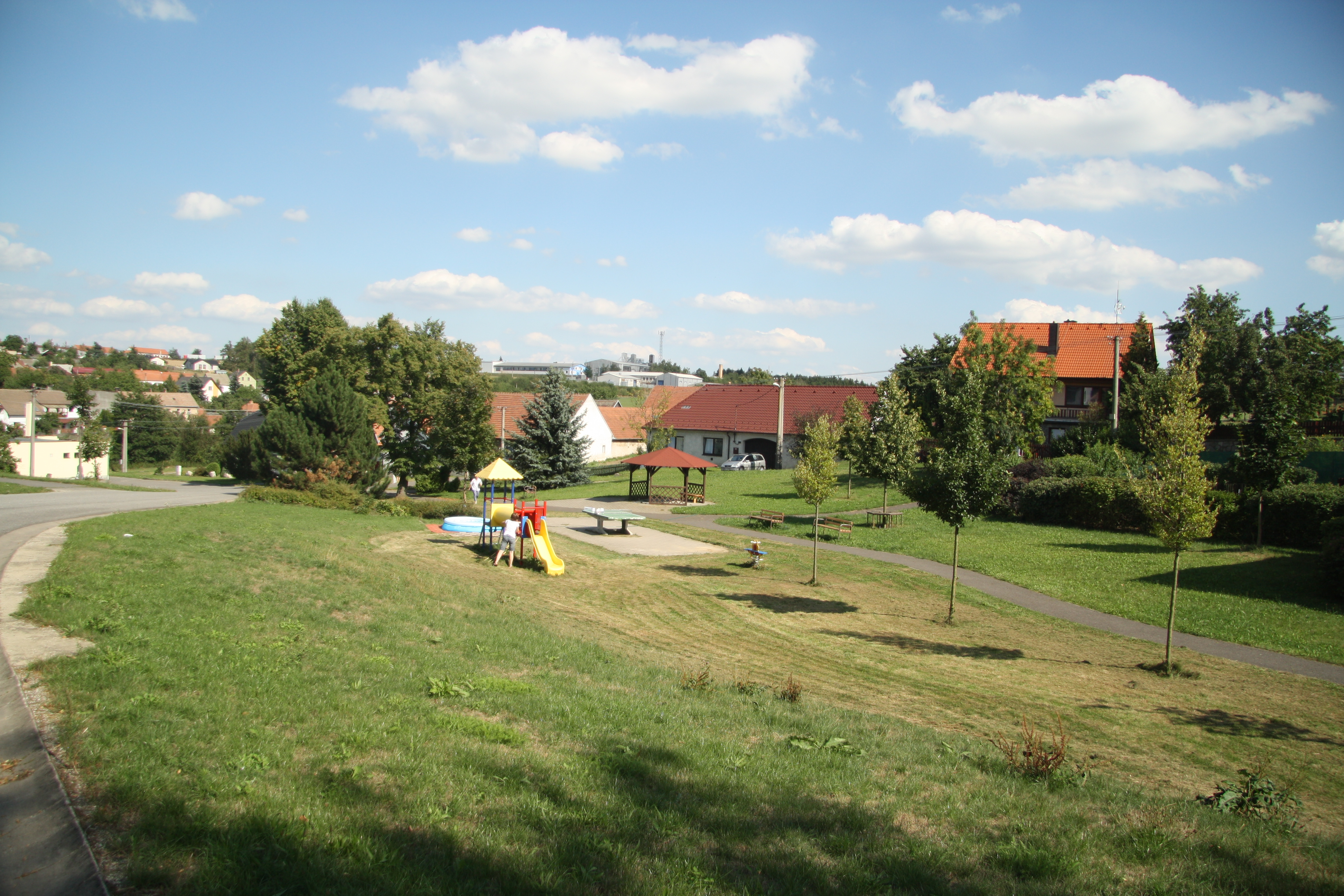
- Centre of Záblatí

- Flag Coat of arms

- Location in the Czech Republic
- Coordinates: 49°19′15″N 16°9′59″E
- Country: Czech Republic
- Region: Vysočina
- District: Žďár nad Sázavou
- First mentioned: 1376

Area
  - Total: 4.15 km^{2} (1.60 sq mi)
- Elevation: 527 m (1,729 ft)

Population (2026-01-01)
  - Total: 275
  - Density: 66.3/km^{2} (172/sq mi)
- Time zone: UTC+1 (CET)
  - Summer (DST): UTC+2 (CEST)
- Postal code: 594 53
- Website: www.obec-zablati.cz

Záblatí is a municipality and village in Žďár nad Sázavou District in the Vysočina Region of the Czech Republic. It has about 300 inhabitants.

Záblatí lies approximately 32 kilometres (20 mi) south-east of Žďár nad Sázavou, 43 km (27 mi) east of Jihlava, and 152 km (94 mi) south-east of Prague.

== Demographics ==
Historical population
Year	Pop.	±%
1869	274	—
1880	265	−3.3%
1890	242	−8.7%
1900	220	−9.1%
1910	220	+0.0%
1921	230	+4.5%
1930	224	−2.6%
1950	186	−17.0%
1961	191	+2.7%
1970	184	−3.7%
1980	173	−6.0%
1991	165	−4.6%
2001	168	+1.8%
2011	185	+10.1%
2021	265	+43.2%
Source: Censuses
