= Záblatí (Jindřichův Hradec District) =

- Municipality
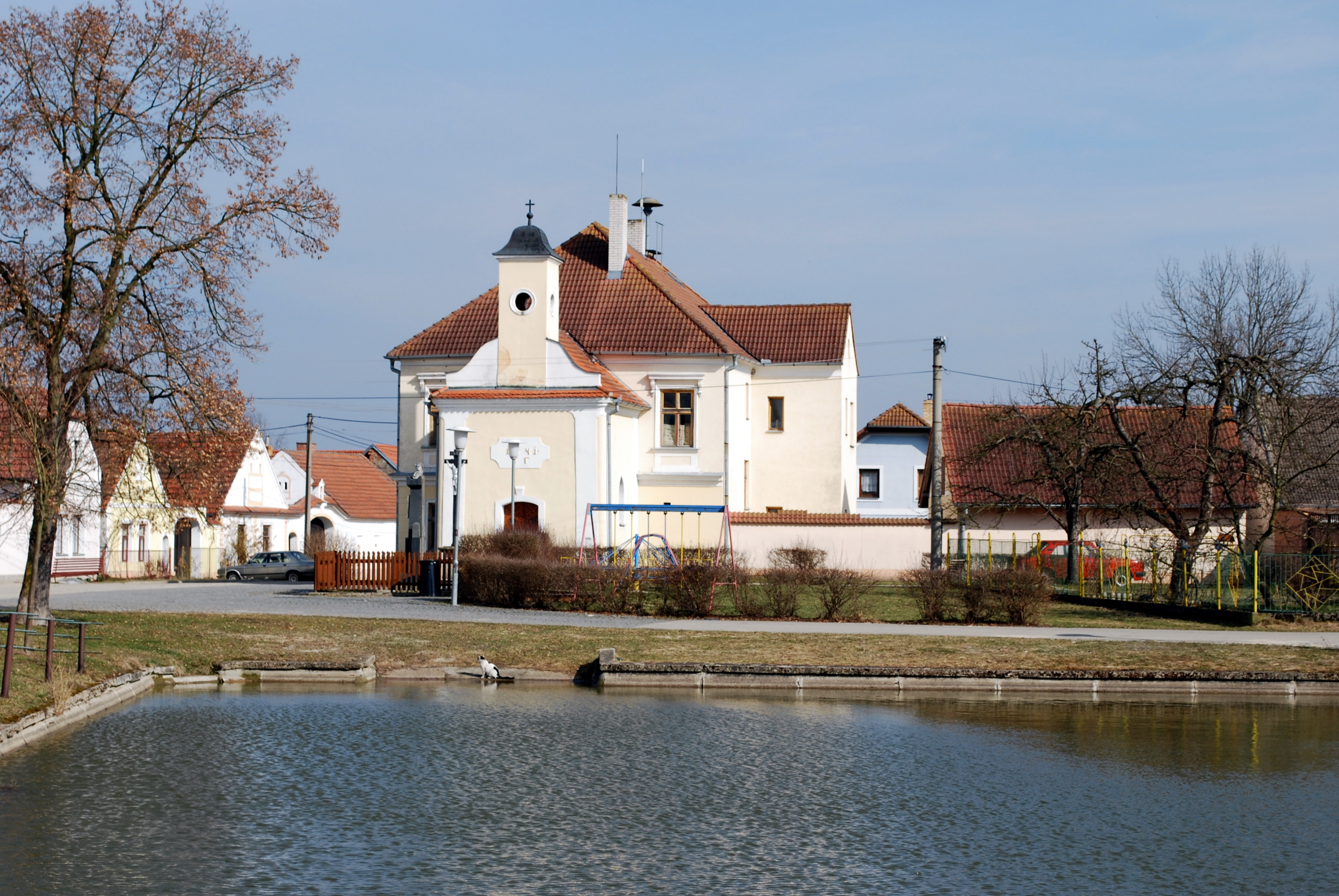
- Chapel in the centre of Záblatí

- Location in the Czech Republic
- Coordinates: 49°6′26″N 14°41′10″E
- Country: Czech Republic
- Region: South Bohemian
- District: Jindřichův Hradec
- First mentioned: 1358

Area
  - Total: 10.28 km^{2} (3.97 sq mi)
- Elevation: 423 m (1,388 ft)

Population (2026-01-01)
  - Total: 103
  - Density: 10.0/km^{2} (26.0/sq mi)
- Time zone: UTC+1 (CET)
  - Summer (DST): UTC+2 (CEST)
- Postal code: 379 01
- Website: www.zablati.cz

Záblatí is a municipality and village in Jindřichův Hradec District in the South Bohemian Region of the Czech Republic. It has about 100 inhabitants.

Záblatí lies approximately 25 kilometres (16 mi) west of Jindřichův Hradec, 21 km (13 mi) north-east of České Budějovice, and 111 km (69 mi) south of Prague.

== Demographics ==
Historical population
Year	Pop.	±%
1869	334	—
1880	311	−6.9%
1890	330	+6.1%
1900	314	−4.8%
1910	312	−0.6%
1921	266	−14.7%
1930	238	−10.5%
1950	172	−27.7%
1961	158	−8.1%
1970	115	−27.2%
1980	105	−8.7%
1991	85	−19.0%
2001	83	−2.4%
2011	72	−13.3%
2021	80	+11.1%
Source: Censuses
