= Martin Baxa =

Czech politician

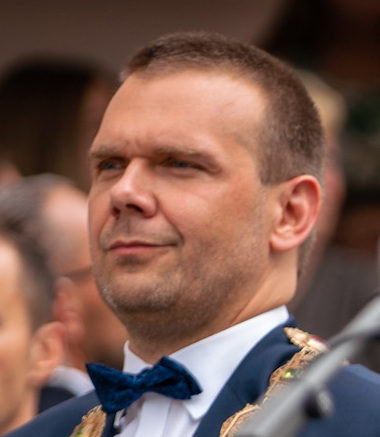
- Baxa in 2020

Minister of Culture
- In office 17 December 2021 – 15 December 2025
- Prime Minister: Petr Fiala
- Preceded by: Lubomír Zaorálek
- Succeeded by: Oto Klempíř

Member of the Chamber of Deputies of the Czech Republic
- Incumbent
- Assumed office 21 October 2017

Mayor of Plzeň
- In office 15 November 2018 – 17 January 2022
- Preceded by: Martin Zrzavecký
- Succeeded by: Pavel Šindelář
- In office 25 November 2010 – 6 November 2014
- Preceded by: Pavel Rödl
- Succeeded by: Martin Zrzavecký

Personal details
- Born: 16 September 1975 (age 50) Plzeň, Czechoslovakia (now Czech Republic)
- Party: ODS
- Spouse: Simona Klečková
- Education: Masaryk University

Martin Baxa (born 16 September 1975) is a Czech politician, who served as the Minister of Culture of the Czech Republic in the cabinet of Petr Fiala from 2021 to 2025. He has been a member of the Chamber of Deputies (MP) for the Civic Democratic Party (ODS) since October 2017. He previously served as mayor of Plzeň from 2010 to 2014, and again from 2018 to 2022.

== Early life ==
Baxa was born in Plzeň in 1975. He studied at a local grammar school before attending Masaryk University from 1994 until 1999. He later became a teacher at a grammar School in Plzeň.

== Political career ==
=== Early career in Plzeň ===
In the 1998 Czech municipal elections, Baxa ran for Plzeň City Council as a non-party member for the Civic Democratic Alliance (ODA), but was not elected.

He joined the Civic Democratic Party (ODS) in 1999, and was elected to the Plzeň Municipal Assembly in 2002. He was also a member of the Regional Council from 2004 until 2008.

He led ODS into the municipal elections in Plzeň in 2010, the only regional city where the party won that year. As a result, Baxa became the youngest mayor in the city's history in November 2010.

Baxa led ODS again in the 2014 Plzeň municipal election, in which the party was expected to lose heavily but eventually finished second behind ANO 2011. ODS formed a coalition with the Social Democratic Party (ČSSD), KDU-ČSL, and Citizens Patriots, and Baxa switched roles with his first deputy mayor Martin Zrzavecký, who became the new mayor.

Baxa also led ODS into regional elections in Plzeň in 2016, with the party finishing third and becoming part of the regional government. Baxa himself received the highest number of preferential votes.

=== Chamber of Deputies ===
In the 2017 Czech parliamentary election, Baxa was ranked third on the ODS list for the Plzeň region, but moved to first after receiving 4,655 preference votes, and thus elected to the Chamber of Deputies.

On 13 January 2018, Baxa was elected vice-chairman of ODS at a congress in Ostrava, defending this post at subsequent ODS congresses in January 2020, and April 2022.

Baxa again led the ODS list for Plzeň City Council at the 2018 municipal elections, in which his party finished second and Baxa defended his seat. After a coalition was formed of ODS, ANO 2011, TOP 09, and ČSSD were formed, Baxa replaced Martin Zrzavecký as Mayor.

=== Ministerial career ===
In the 2021 Czech parliamentary election, Baxa led the Spolu coalition's candidate list for the Plzeň Region as a member of ODS. He was appointed as Minister of Culture in the cabinet of Petr Fiala on 17 December. Upon his appointment, Baxa resigned as mayor of Plzeň in January 2022 and was replaced by Pavel Šindelář.

In the 2022 Czech municipal elections, Baxa was re-elected on the ODS list for Plzeň council.

== Personal life ==
Baxa married his long-term partner Simona Klečková on 2 August 2015.
