= 2014 Plzeň municipal election =

- 10–11 October 2014

All 47 seats in the Assembly 23 seats needed for a majority
- Turnout: 33.73%
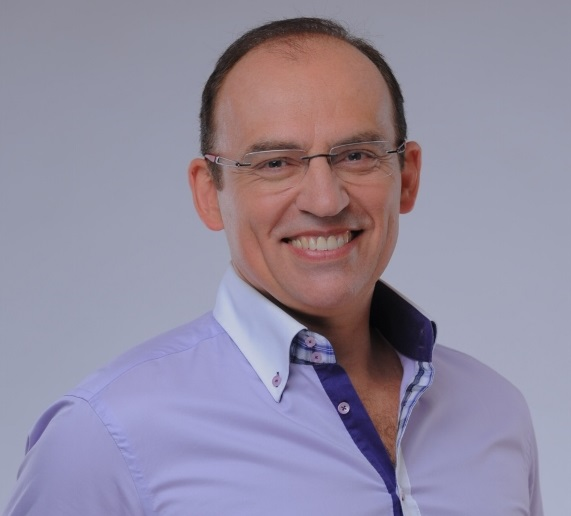

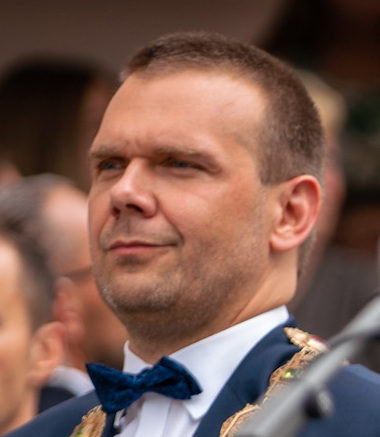

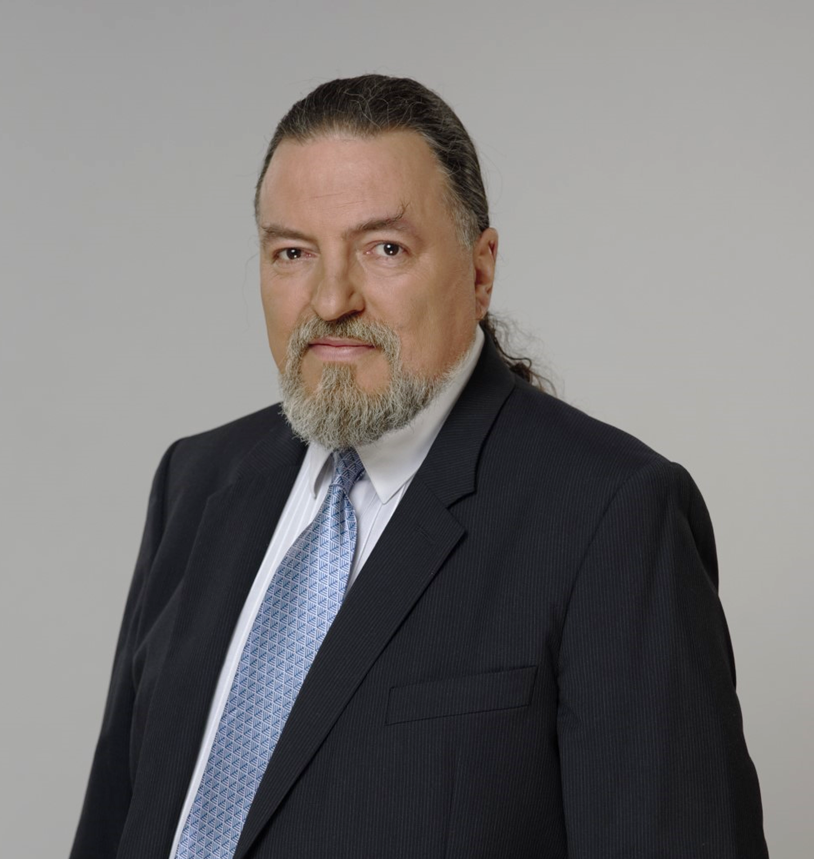

	First party	Second party	Third party
Leader	Pavel Šrámek	Martin Baxa	Martin Zrzavecký
Party	ANO	ODS	ČSSD
Seats won	10	10	10
Popular vote	329,815	323,390	303,042
Percentage	17.9%	17.6%	16.5%
	Fourth party	Fifth party	Sixth party
Leader	Ondřej Ženíšek	Václav Štěkl	Marcel Hájek
Party	TOP 09	KSČM	OPAT
Seats won	5	5	4
Popular vote	166,696	152,903	134,761
Percentage	9.1%	8.3%	7.3%
	Seventh party
Leader	Petr Náhlík
Party	Christian and Democratic Union – Czechoslovak People's Party
Seats won	3
Popular vote	104,535
Percentage	5.7%
Mayor before election
Martin Baxa
ODS
Elected mayor
Martin Zrzavecký
ČSSD

Plzeň municipal election in 2014 was held as part of 2014 Czech municipal elections. It was held on 10 and 11 October 2014. ANO 2011 received the highest number of votes but Civic Democratic Party (ODS) and Czech Social Democratic Party (ČSSD) won the same number of seats in the City's assembly. Civic Democratic Party ruled in Plzeň more than 20 years but was expected to lose its positions and receive only 10% of votes. In an electoral upset, ODS received more than 17%. Leader of local Civic Democrats Martin Baxa said that he believes that ODS was the actual victor of the election. Voter turnout was 33.73%.

The coalition between Civic Democratic Party, Czech Social Democratic Party, Christian and Democratic Union – Czechoslovak People's Party and Citizens Patriots was formed on 18 October. Social Democrat Martin Zrzavecký became Mayor of Plzeň while Civic Democrat Baxa his First Deputy.

== Parties contesting the election ==
=== ANO 2011 ===
Centrist ANO 2011 was led by MP Pavel Šrámek. ANO was considered one of the front-runners in the city. ANO wanted to focus on analysis of city's public debt and on Traffic. Šrámek stated that he would organise European Capital of Culture more humbly.

=== Christian and Democratic Union - Czechoslovak People's Party (KDU-ČSL) ===
Centrist KDU-ČSL was led by Petr Náhlík. KDU-ČSL aimed at traffic and city's debt during the election.

=== Citizens Patriots (OPAT) ===
Local party OPAT was formed in July 2014 by parties Občané.cz and Patriots. I was led by Marcel Hájek. OPAT won support of many celebrities from Plzeň such as Director Václav Chaloupek or Ice Hockey Player Michal Dvořák.

=== Civic Democratic Party (ODS) ===
Centre-right ODS was led by incumbent Mayor Martin Baxa. Baxa stated that the main task for incoming City Council would be European Capital of Culture 2015 and use of its potential. Party was expected to lose heavily and many visible personas of ODS left the party and ran for different formations. Party focused during its campaign to presenting its successes in previous years. Priorities for 2014-2018 were European Capital of Culture, continuity of Traffic buildings and Tram Line to Borská pole.

=== Communist Party of Bohemia and Moravia (KSČM) ===
KSČM was led by Václav Štekl.

=== Czech Social Democratic Party (ČSSD) ===
Centre-left ČSSD was led by Martin Zrzavecký. ČSSD ruled in grand coalition with ODS since 2010. Party's priorities was drawing subsidies from European Union, investment to Science and Traffic. ČSSD was front-runner according to polls.

=== Right Choice for Plzeň (PVP) ===
Local party led by Vladimír Duchek. The party focused on building of infrastructure and fight against gambling.

=== TOP 09 ===
Centre-right TOP 09 was led by MP Ondřej Ženíšek. TOP 09 aimed for European Capital of Culture and closure of the city to cars. It also opposed Gambling in the city and corruption.

== Campaign ==
Poster for the campaign of the Civic Democratic Party

Civic Democratic Party led campaign with slogan "Plzeň is different" with subtitle "We didn't play a theatre, we build it." Party's billboards used blue colour which contrasted with campaign of other parties that used white colour. ODS presented itself by successes of its rule over the city in previous term. Campaign of Civic Democrats was awarded by 8 Golden Ballot Awards. Campaign of ODS was manufactured by Adam Hejl, Michal Kupilík and Petr Sokol.

Civic Democratic Party was expected to receive less than 10% of votes and ANO 2011 was front-runner along with Czech Social Democratic Party. Civic Democratic Party eventually came second and won 10 seats. The same number was won by ANO 2011 and Social Democratic Party.

== Opinion polling ==
Published	Company	ČSSD	ANO	TOP 09	OPAT	KSČM	ODS	KDU ČSL	SzP	VZP	PVP	SSO	DSZ	ZpP	others
11 October 2014	Election	16.5	17.9	9.1	7.3	8.3	17.6	5.7	4.8	2.9	2.7	2.2	0.1	2.5	2.4
29 September 2014	Sanep	20.3-23.8	18.2-22.6	11.9-12.6	8.6-12.2	8.4-9.8	7.1-10.4	4.1-6.2	3.2-6.0	3.5-6.1	3.9-5.3	2.1-3.2	1.8-3.1	0.6-3.0	>3
11 September 2014	Sanep	20.5-23.9	17.9-22.1	11.7-12.4	7.8-10.4	8.4-9.8	7.8-9.6	4.1-6.3	3.1-6.1	3.4-5.9	4.1-5.6	2.1-3.1	1.9-3.0	0.6-3.0	>3
20–21 October 2013	2013 legislative election	20.3	18.9	15.1	0.3	11.8	11.3	5.0	6.8	5.0	N/A	3.0	N/A	N/A	2.6

== Results ==
Party	Leader	Votes	%	Seats
ANO 2011	Pavel Šrámek	329,815	17.90	10
Civic Democratic Party	Martin Baxa	323,390	17.55	10
Czech Social Democratic Party	Martin Zrzavecký	303,042	16.45	10
TOP 09	Ondřej Ženíšek	166,696	9.05	5
Communist Party of Bohemia and Moravia	Václav Štěkl	152,903	8.30	5
Citizens Patriots	Marcel Hájek	134,761	7.31	4
Christian and Democratic Union – Czechoslovak People's Party	Petr Náhlík	104,535	5.67	3
Together for Plzeň	Petr Vaněk	88,100	4.78	0
Public Interests of Plzeň	Dita Portová	53,661	2.91	0
Right Choice for Plzeň	Vladimír Duchek	50,469	2.74	0
Change for Plzeň	Martin Marek	45,763	2.48	0
Party of Free Citizens	Jan Zavadil	41,131	2.23	0
Plzeň for Sport	Naděžda Mauleová	32,906	1.79	0
Workers' Party	Jiří Štěpánek	10,215	0.55	0
Party of Civic Rights	Jan Kůrka	2,358	0.19	0
Republic	Martin Ščepka	2,025	0.13	0
Democratic Green Party	Zdeněk Kylián	844	0.05	0
Total		1 842 614	100	47

=== Elected representatives ===
Num	Representative	Party	Votes
1.	Martin Baxa	ODS	9,843
2.	Jiří Šneberger	ODS	8,539
3.	Lumír Aschenbrenner	ODS	8,530
4.	Ivana Mádlová	ANO	7,882
5.	Pavel Šrámek	ANO	7,791
6.	Miloslava Rutová	ANO	7,610
7.	Roman Zarzycký	ANO	7,502
8.	Bohuslav Rada	ANO	7,434
9.	Veronika Jilichová Nová	ODS	7,426
10.	Vlastimil Gola	ANO	7,388
11.	David Procházka	ANO	7,311
12.	Pavel Šindelář	ODS	7,311
13.	Petr Fišer	ANO	7,250
14.	Petr Šustáček	ANO	7,232
15.	Eliška Bartáková	ANO	7,219
16.	Martin Zrzavecký	ČSSD	7,182
17.	Eva Herinková	ČSSD	7,098
18.	David Šlouf	ODS	7,054
19.	Helena Matoušová	ODS	7,039
20.	Milan Uhlík	ODS	7,019
21.	Jakub Čermák	ODS	6,992
22.	Eva Trůková	ODS	6,972
23.	Miroslav Brabec	ČSSD	6,898
24.	Petr Osvald	ČSSD	6,792
25.	Jiří Kuthan	ČSSD	6,703
26.	Jiří Bis	ČSSD	6,673
27.	Pavel kotas	ČSSD	6,666
28.	Rusolf Mayer	ČSSD	6,634
29.	Pavel Duchek	ČSSD	6,617
30.	Milan Šupík	ČSSD	6,531
31.	Ondřej Ženíšek	TOP 09	4,688
32.	Michal Vozobule	TOP 09	4,221
33.	Marcel Hájek	OPAT	4,157
34.	Václav Chaloupek	OPAT	4,139
35.	Ilona Jehličková	TOP 09	3,953
36.	Jan Fluxa	TOP 09	3,924
37.	Petr Suchý	TOP 09	3,833
38.	Václav Štěkl	KSČM	3,766
39.	Petr Náhlík	KDU-ČSL	3,690
40.	Jana Bystřická	KSČM	3,570
41.	Ludvík Rösch	OPAT	3,478
42.	Monika Magdaléna Štefanová	KSČM	3,458
43.	Karel Kvit	KSČM	3,441
44.	František Hrubeš	KSČM	3,429
45.	Michal Dvořák	OPAT	3,412
46.	Pavel Boček	KDU-ČSL	3,091
47.	Pavel Janouškovec	KDU-ČSL	3,036

== Aftermath ==
=== Reactions ===
Civic Democratic leader Martin Baxa was amazed by result of his party. He stated that ODS was de facto victor of the election. He stated that voters appreciated successes of the previous council. He was also glad that he received highest number of votes of all candidates.

Pavel Šrámek also considered the result a success. He stated that "History never asks how much you win but if you win. Both strongest parties, ODS and ANO 2011 expressed intention to negotiate with all other parties with exception of Communists.

Leader of Social Democrats Martin Zrzavecký admitted disappointment with the election. "None of us expected ODS to be that successful and we are third and can't be satisfied as we should be. Zrzavecký expressed will to negotiate with ANO 2011 and ODS.

=== Coalition formation ===
Coalition talks started soon after the election. Media talked about Martin Baxa, Martin Zrzavecký and Pavel Šrámek as possible candidates for Mayor. Coalition needed to consist of at least 3 parties. Coalition was formed on 18 October 2014. Civic Democratic Party formed Council with Czech Social Democratic Party, Christian and Democratic Union - Czechoslovak People's Party and Citizens Patriots. Coalition has majority of 27 seats. Social Democrat Zrzavecký became the mayor while Civic Democratic leader Baxa became deputy Mayor. Council consists of 4 Civic Democrats, 3 Social Democrats, 1 Christian Democrat and 1 Citizen Patriot.

Czech Social Democratic Party originally planned to form coalition with ANO 2011 and Christian and Democratic Union – Czechoslovak People's Party but changed mind due to alleged unreliability of Pavel Šrámek.

Election of the new council was held on 6 November 2014. Martin Zrzavecký was elected new Mayor while Martin Baxa became his first Deputy. Roman Zarzycký was elected Chairman of the control committee which is position traditionally held by leader of opposition.

=== Formed council ===
Position	Member	Party	Received votes
Mayor	Martin Zrzavecký	ČSSD	28 / 46
1st Deputy, deputy for culture	Martin Baxa	ODS	27 / 46
Economical deputy	Pavel Kotas	ČSSD	27 / 46
Deputy for transport and environment	Petr Náhlík	KDU-ČSL	27 / 46
Technical Deputy	Pavel Šindelář	ODS	28 / 46
Deputy for education and social affairs	Eva Herinková	ČSSD	27 / 46
Councillor for management of city's property	Helena Matoušová	ODS	27 / 46
Councillor for support of business and sport	Michal Dvořák	OPAT	28 / 46
Councillor for management of city's estates	David Šlouf	ODS	27 / 46

=== Other major positions ===
Position	Member	Party	Received votes
Chairman of control committee	Roman Zarzycký	ANO	35 / 46

=== Later development ===
Council then organised European Capital of Culture in 2015. Martin Baxa was responsible for the project as a Deputy for Culture. The project was positively received by MEPS and citizens of Plzeň. On 7 December 2015 Supreme audit office released report that criticised that one third of Subsidies wasn't pumped. City and council disagreed with the report and submitted objections. Complex report on the project was released in June 2016. It praised economical impac on the city. Visitors spent over 500 Million Czech crowns in the city and new jobs were created.

In February 2015 Chairman of control committee and ANO 2011 politician Roman Zárzycký was charged that he broke into a computer of his ex-wife and stole intimate information about her business and used it for his opportunity. Jury concluded in December 2016 that Zárzycký got this information from his sons mobile and that Zárzyck didn't commit a misconduct he was charged with. Zárzycký got access to his wife's Facebook conversation from his son's mobile. Information there showed that his wife was smoking weed and regularly drinking. Zárzycký was alleged to use this information along with intimate photographs of his ex-wife during a dispute over a custody of their children. Jury concluded that concerns over children were stronger than protection of mail secret

Pavel Šrámek resigned on his position in regional ANO in October 2015. It was speculated that it was a result of the election and Šrámek's failure to form a coalition. Šrámek refused these speculations and stated it was dueto his work in the Parliament.

Michal Dvořák left the council on 20 April 2017 and was replaced by Petr Chvojka. Dvořák was charged with allegations of corruption.
