= 2022 Czech municipal elections =

- 23–24 September 2022

All 61 780 seats in municipal councils
- Turnout: 46.07%
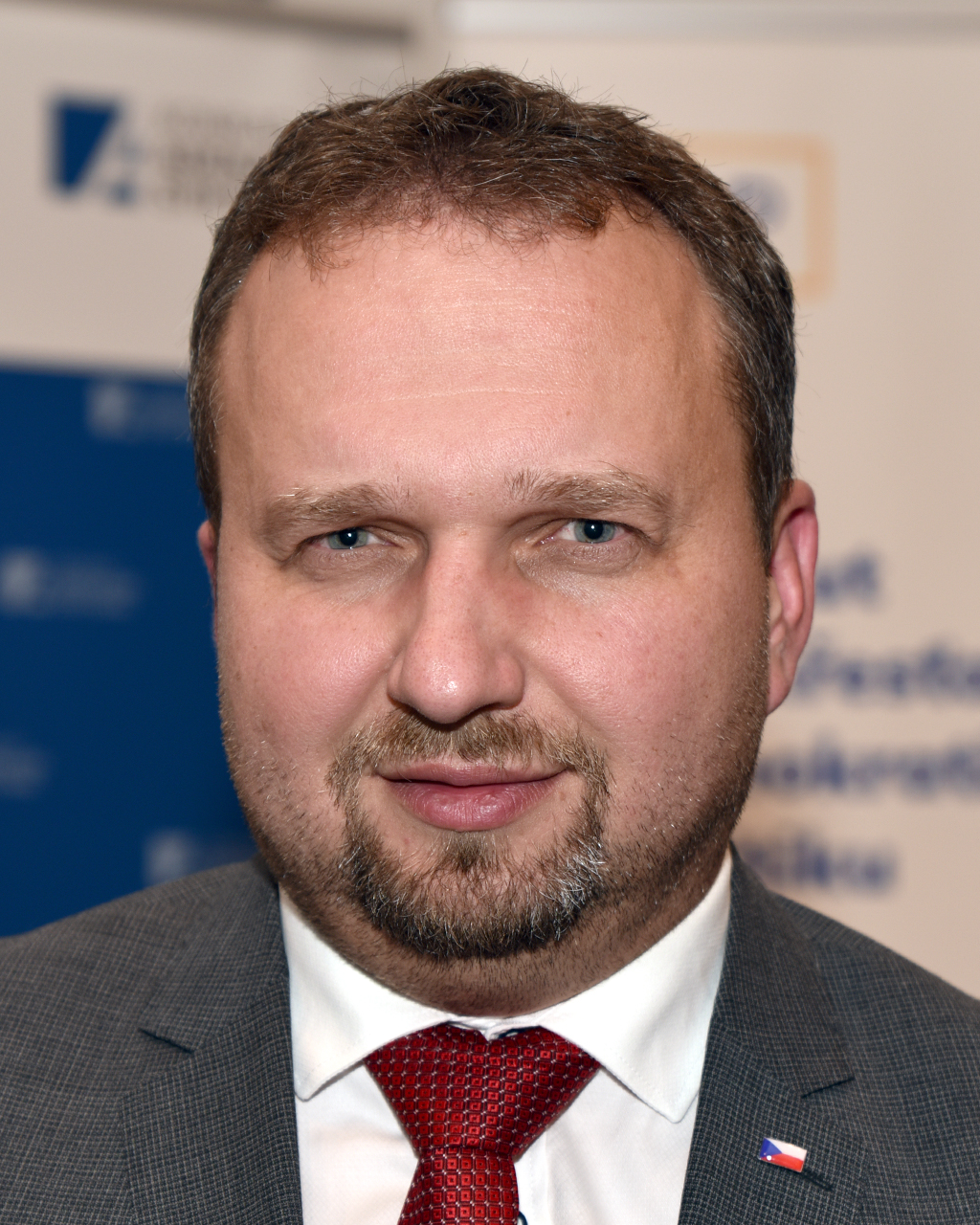

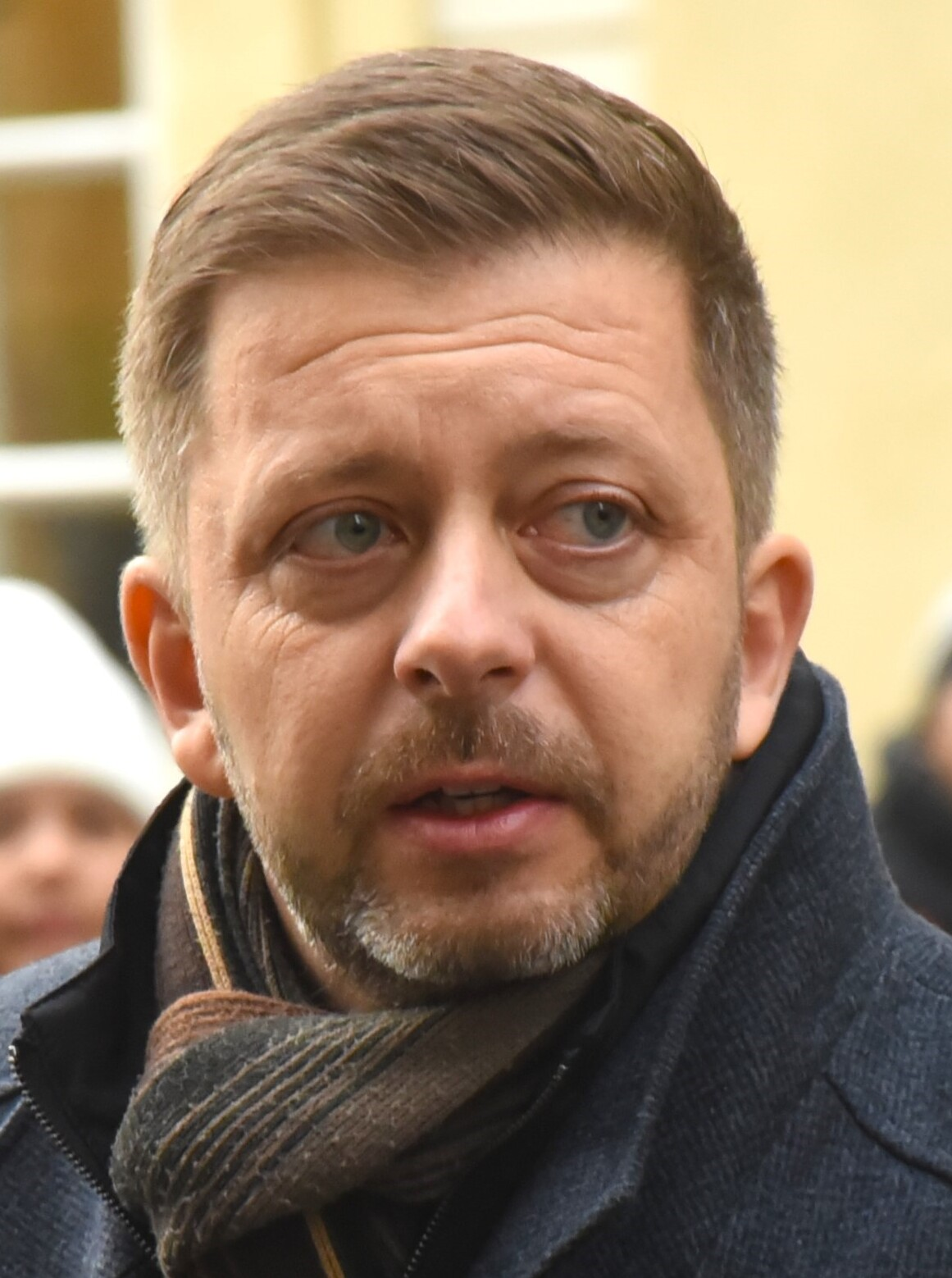

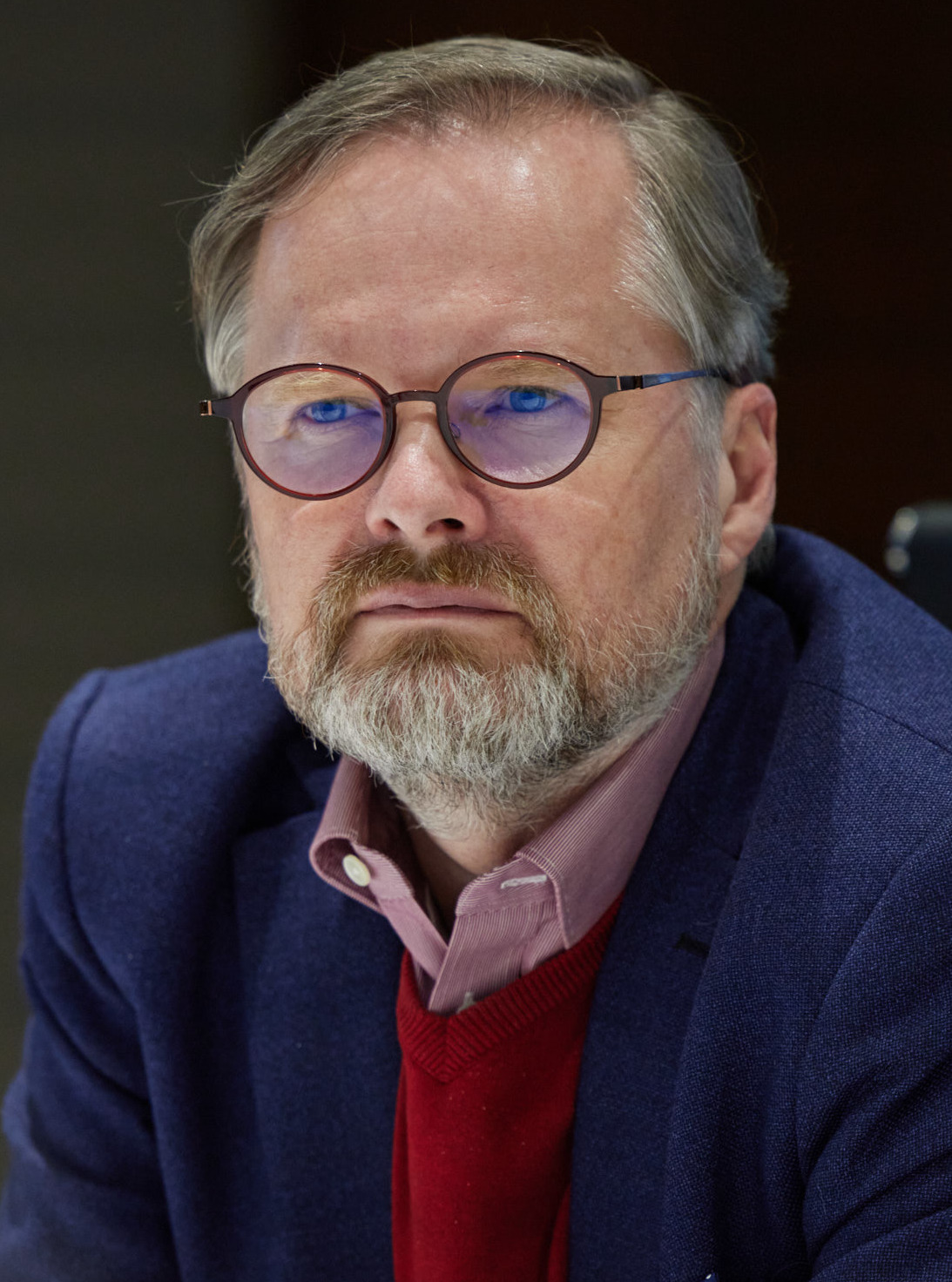

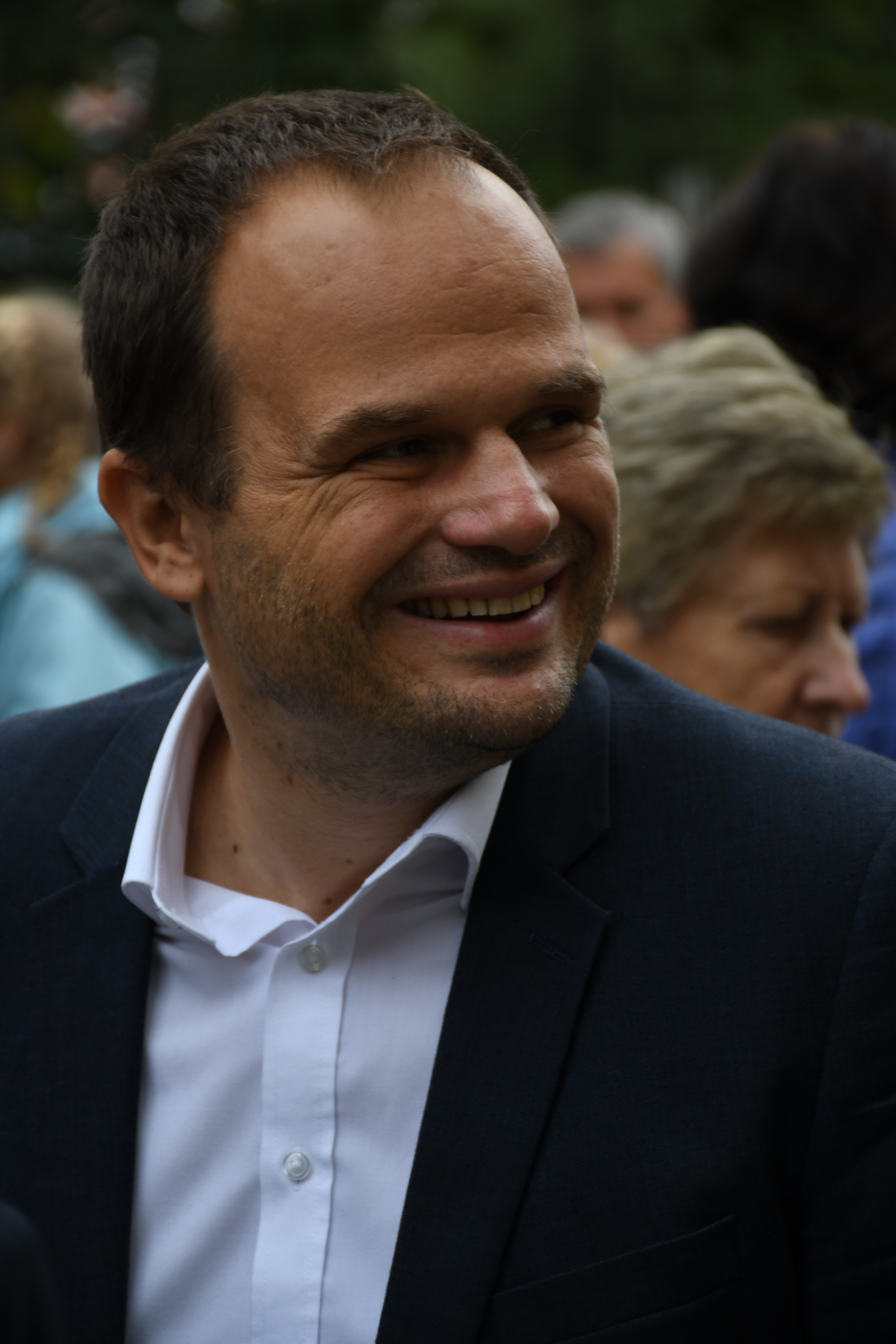

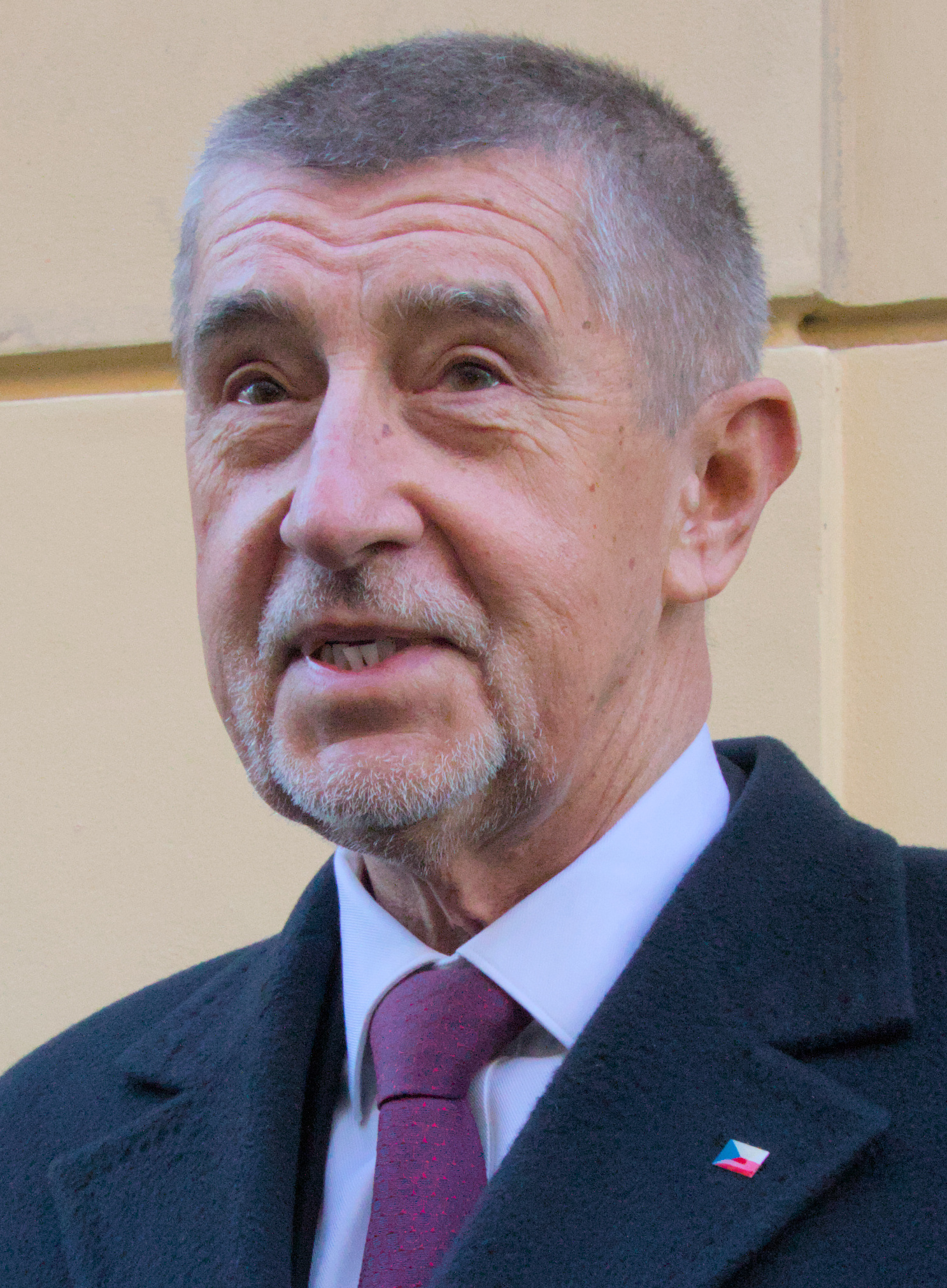

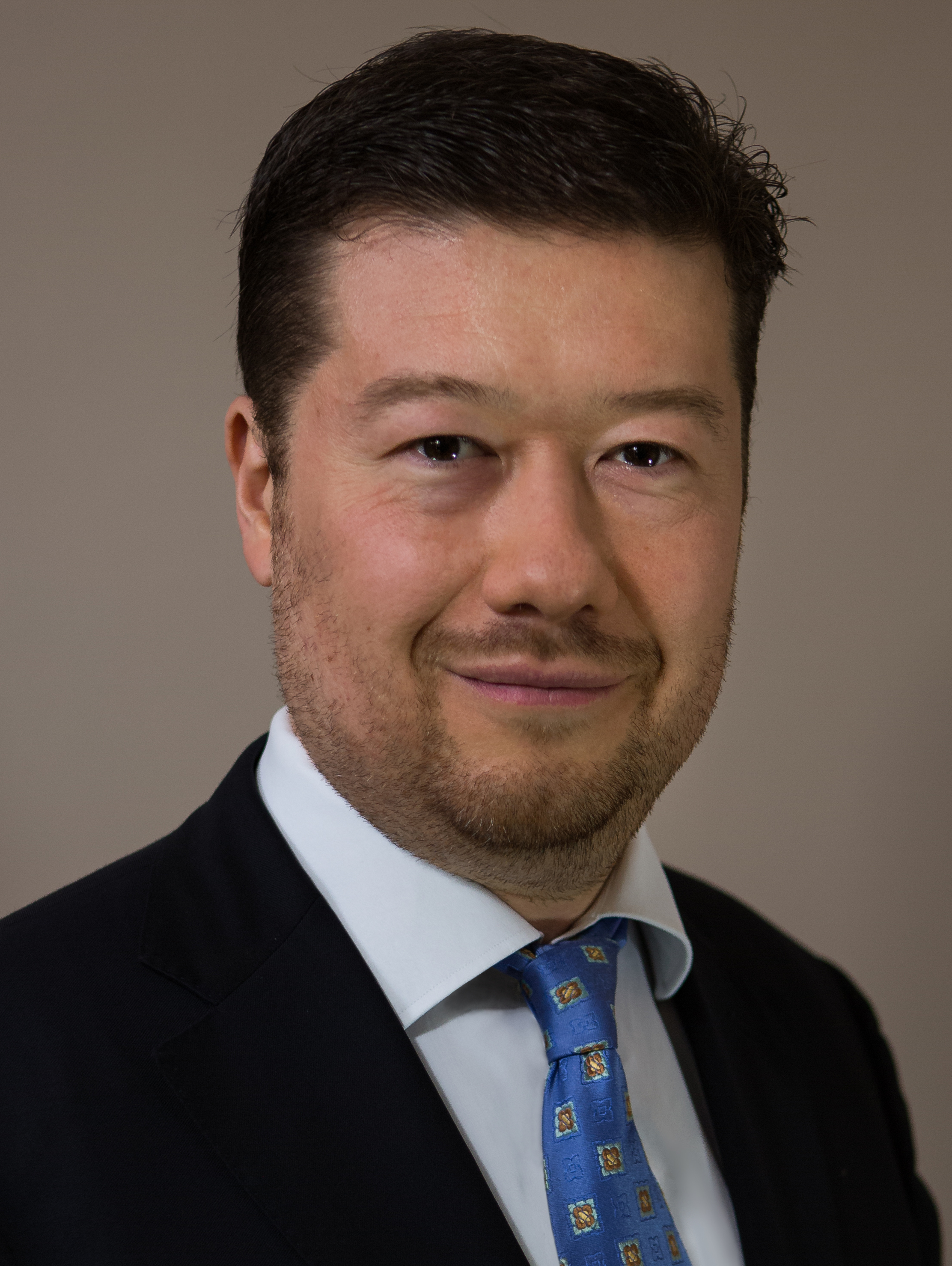
	First party	Second party	Third party
Leader	Marian Jurečka	Vít Rakušan	Petr Fiala
Party	KDU-ČSL	STAN	ODS
Last election	3,633 seats	2,600 seats	2,589 seats
Seats won	3,252	1 854	2 294
Seat change	▼381	▼896	▼296
Popular vote	5,457,419	5,202,973	12,977,999
Percentage	5.08%	4.85%	12.09%
	Fourth party	Fifth party	Sixth party
Leader	Michal Šmarda	Andrej Babiš	Tomio Okamura
Party	SOCDEM	ANO	SPD
Last election	1,935 seats	1,670 seats	158 seats
Seats won	799	1,748	492
Seat change	▼1,138	▲73	▲334
Popular vote	2,670,520	18,923,075	4,882,128
Percentage	2.49%	17.63%	4.55%

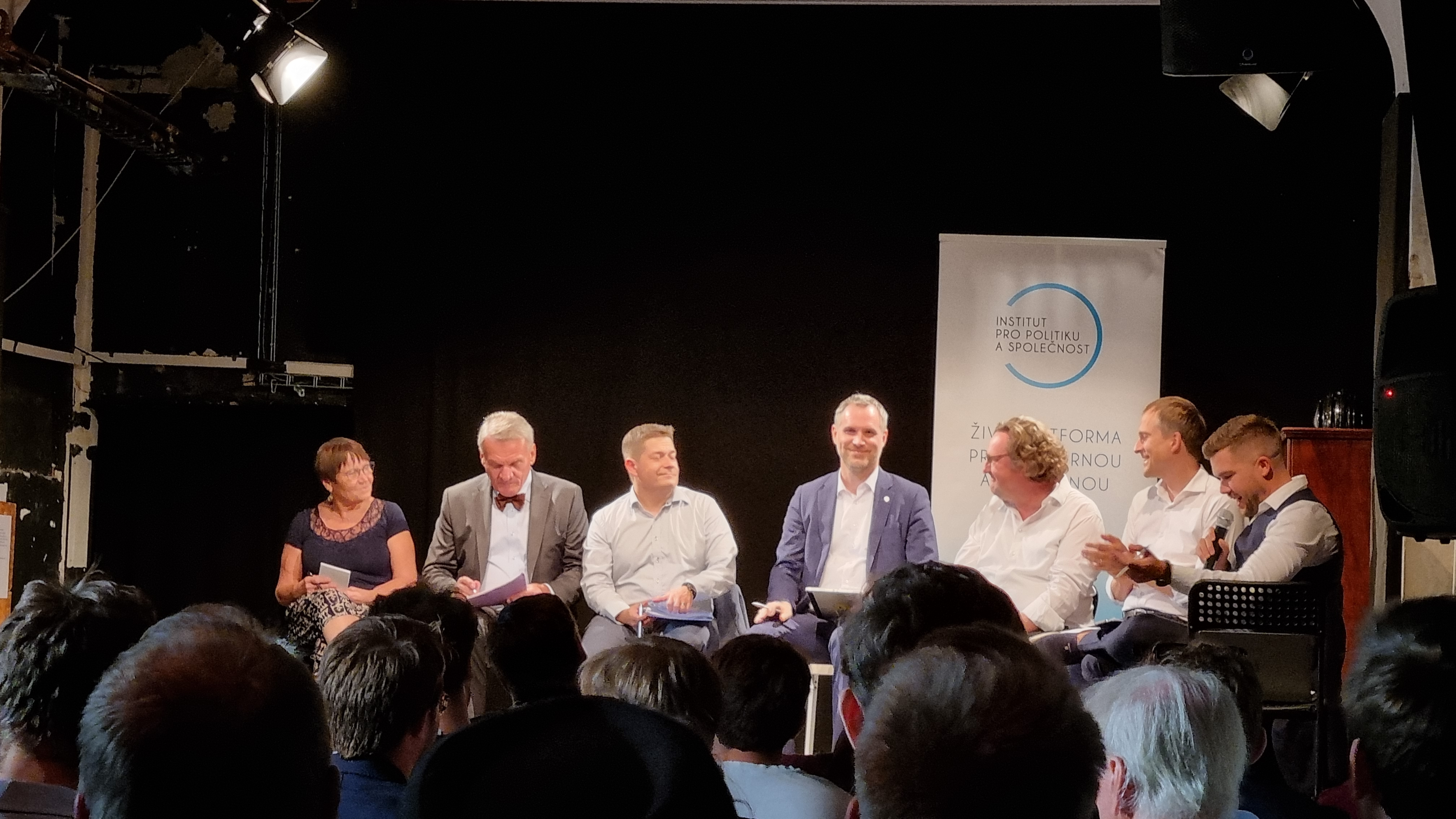

Municipal elections were held in the Czech Republic on 23 and 24 September 2022.

== Campaign ==
=== Mayors and Independents (STAN) ===
STAN launched the spring phase of its campaign on 19 April 2022. Party leader Vít Rakušan called it a "key election" and the party thus chose a Key as a symbol for the party campaign. Rakušan stated that the party wants to show smart and inspirative solutions from experience. The party also introduced the "I want to run" ("Chci kandidovat") project, which aims to help people enter politics.

== Result ==
Party	Seats
KDU-ČSL	3,252
Civic Democratic Party	2,294
Mayors and Independents	1,854
ANO 2011	1,748
Czech Social Democratic Party	799
Freedom and Direct Democracy	492
Communist Party of Bohemia and Moravia	466
TOP 09	428
Czech Pirate Party	274
Non-Partisans	233
INDEPENDENTS	233
SNK European Democrats	187
Green Party	129
Local Movements of Independents for Harmonic Development of Municipalities and Towns	124
Independents	47,732

== See also ==
- 2022 Brno municipal election
- 2022 Prague municipal election
- 2022 Plzeň municipal election
- 2022 Ostrava municipal election
