= November 2024 Czech Pirate Party leadership election =

- 9 November 2024
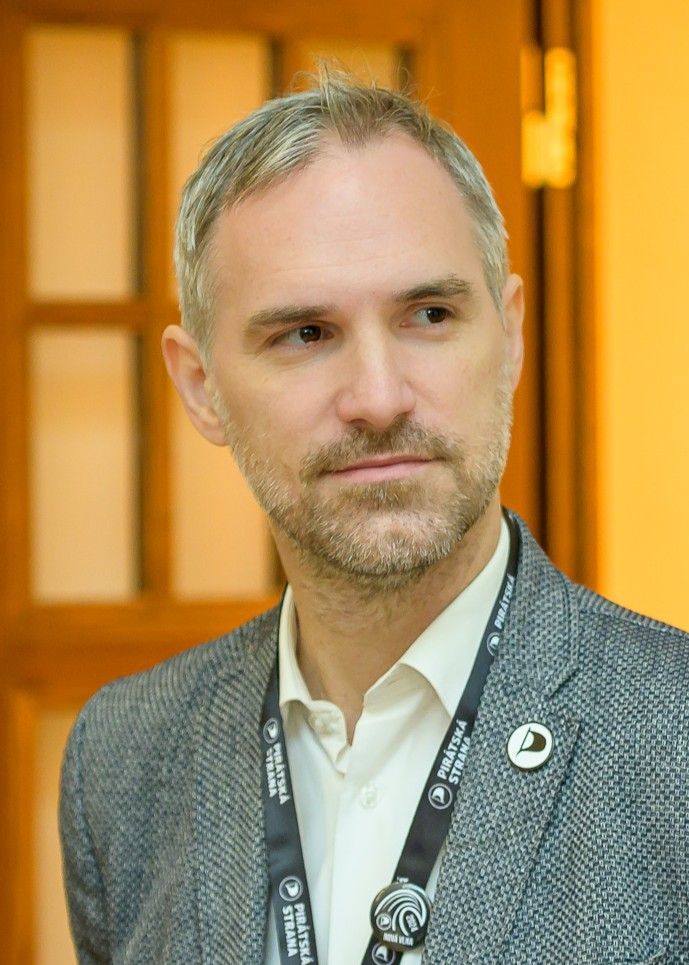

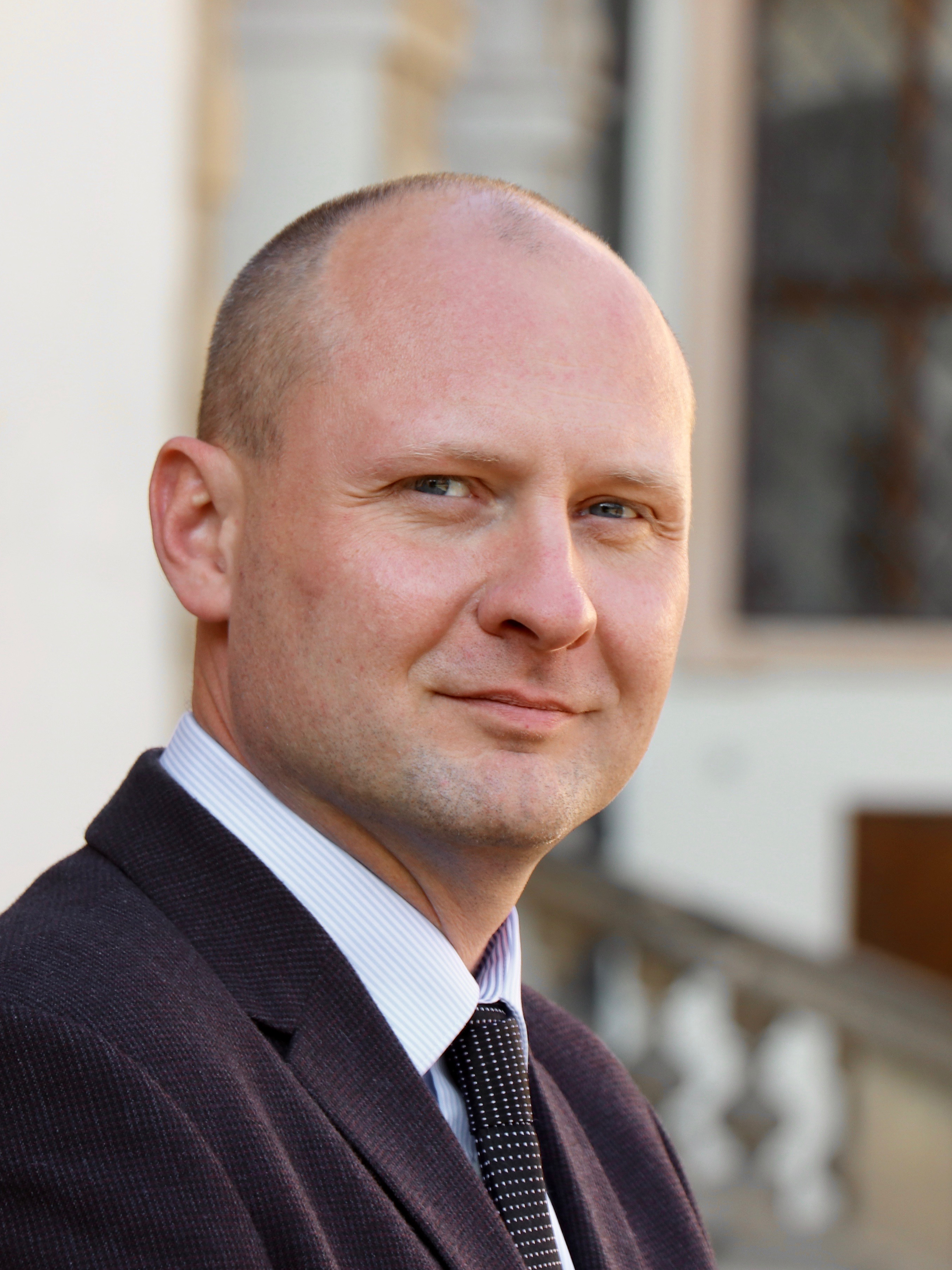
Candidate	Zdeněk Hřib	Lukáš Wagenknecht
Delegate votes	454	401
Percentage	52.4%	46.3%
Leader of Pirates before election
Ivan Bartoš
Elected Leader of Pirates
Zdeněk Hřib

The Czech Pirate Party held a leadership election on 9 November 2024. The previous party leadership, including Ivan Bartoš, resigned in September 2024, following poor results in the regional and senate elections.

== Background ==
The Czech Pirate Party had been led by Ivan Bartoš since 2016. Under his leadership, they became the third largest party in the Czech Republic at the 2017 legislative election, with 22 seats. Bartoš also led the party during the 2021 election, which the party contested as part of the Pirates and Mayors electoral alliance. Due to preferential voting, the Pirates received only 4 seats of the 37 seats won by the alliance. After the election, a part of the membership called for Bartoš' resignation. The party joined the Fiala government following the election.

In 2024, the party suffered heavy losses in the 2024 European Parliament, regional and senate elections. Bartoš then resigned as leader and announced he would not run in the subsequent leadership election.

In October 2024, the Pirate members voted to leave the government.

== Campaign ==
=== Candidate announcements ===
On 23 September 2024, Lipavský stated that he would not be running due to his duties as foreign minister, as well as not feeling like someone who could unite the party. Gregorová also declined to run, stating that it would not be fair to voters who elected her to the European Parliament. Špoták expressed interest in running but said he did not feel that he had support within the party. On 23 September 2024, Mikuláš Peksa and Jana Holomčík Leitnerová said they were considering running. Seznam Zprávy reported on 25 September 2024 that former Senator Lukáš Wagenknecht and MP Olga Richterová had strong support within the party. Neither of them ruled out standing at the time. On 2 October 2024, Wagenknecht announced his candidacy. On 8 October 2024, MPs Olga Richterová, Jakub Michálek and Klára Kocmanová confirmed to MF DNES that they would not be running. On 10 October 2024, Zdeněk Hřib announced his candidacy. On 15 October, David Witosz declared his candidacy. On 23 October 2024, former deputy mayor of Prague 3 Štěpán Štrébl announced his candidacy.

== Candidates ==
- Zdeněk Hřib, former Mayor of Prague.
- Zbyněk Miklík, vice governor of Liberec Region. (endorsed Wagenknecht in the 2nd round)
- Lukáš Wagenknecht, former Senator.
- Štěpán Štrébl, former deputy mayor of Prague 3. (endorsed Hřib in the 2nd round)

=== Potential candidates ===
- Hana Hajnová, leader of the Vysočina Region branch
- Jana Michailidu, former deputy leader and spokesperson for addiction issues
- Mikuláš Peksa, former MEP
- Rudolf Špoták, former Governor of the Plzeň Region

==== Declined ====
- Ivan Bartoš, incumbent leader and Minister of Regional Development (was not seeking re-election)
- Markéta Gregorová, MEP
- Jan Lipavský, Minister of Foreign Affairs (left the party following the Pirates' exit from government in October 2024)
- Jana Holomčík Leitnerová, incumbent deputy leader
- Olga Richterová, MP
- Jakub Michálek, MP
- Klára Kocmanová, MP
- Adéla Šípová, Senator (endorsed Wagenknecht)
- David Witosz, deputy mayor of Moravská Ostrava (endorsed Wagenknecht)

== Voting ==
In the first round, where each delegate could vote for as many candidates as they wanted, Hřib won a plurality with 511 votes followed by Wagenknecht with 494 votes. These two candidates advanced from the first round of voting. In the second round, Hřib received 454 votes and Wagenknecht 401 votes, with Hřib elected as the new leader.

Candidate	Votes (1st round)	Votes (2nd round)	
Zdeněk Hřib	511	454	52.42%
Lukáš Wagenknecht	494	401	46.30%
Zbyněk Miklík	209		
Štěpán Štrébl	178		
Invalid		11	1.27%
Turnout	819	866	

== Aftermath ==
=== Figures leaving the party ===
The party's expert on addiction issues, Jana Michailidu, left the party following the election due to political differences with the new leadership. Former MEP Marcel Kolaja, Zbyněk Miklík, and former leader of the Young Pirates Georgia Hejduková also left the party.
