= Czech Pirate Party =

Political party in the Czech Republic

Czech Pirate Party Česká pirátská strana
- Abbreviation: Piráti
- Leader: Zdeněk Hřib
- Deputy Leaders: Martin Šmída; Jiří Hlavenka; Kateřina Stojanová; Olga Richterová
- Chamber of Deputies Leader: Olga Richterová
- MEP Leader: Markéta Gregorová
- Founded: 17 June 2009; 17 years ago
- Headquarters: Na Moráni 360/3, Prague
- Newspaper: Pirátské listy
- Think tank: π Institute
- Youth wing: Young Pirates
- Membership (2026): 1,149
- Ideology: Pirate politics; Liberalism; Social liberalism; Progressivism; Pro-Europeanism
- Political position: Centre to centre-left
- National affiliation: Pirates and Mayors (2020–2021)
- European Parliament group: Greens–European Free Alliance
- International affiliation: Pirate Parties International
- European political alliance: European Pirate Party
- Colours: Black; Purple and yellow (2025)
- Slogan: "Internet je naše moře." (The Internet is our sea) "Nakopneme to!" (Let's kick it!)
- Chamber of Deputies: 16 / 200
- Senate: 0 / 81 (Note: Adéla Šípová, elected as a Pirate senator in 2020, left the party in 2025. However, she remains a supporter of the party.)
- European Parliament: 1 / 21
- Regional councils: 3 / 675
- Local councils: 279 / 61,780
- Prague City Assembly: 13 / 65

Party flag

Website
- pirati.cz

The Czech Pirate Party (Czech: Česká pirátská strana), commonly known as the Pirates (Piráti), is a liberal political party in the Czech Republic. Founded in 2009 as part of the international Pirate movement, it initially focused on digital rights, copyright reform, government transparency and civil liberties. Its programme later expanded to include anti-corruption measures, the digitalisation of public administration, environmental protection and a pro-European foreign policy.

The Pirates first entered the Chamber of Deputies in the 2017 parliamentary election, winning 22 seats. In 2021, they contested the parliamentary election together with Mayors and Independents as the Pirates and Mayors alliance and subsequently joined Petr Fiala's Cabinet. The party left the government in 2024 after Prime Minister Petr Fiala dismissed Pirate leader Ivan Bartoš as minister for regional development amid problems with a new digital building-permit system. Zdeněk Hřib was elected party leader later that year.

In the 2025 parliamentary election, the Pirates received 8.97% of the vote and their lists won 18 seats. Two of those seats were won by members of the Green Party standing on Pirate lists. The party is also represented in the European Parliament by Markéta Gregorová, a member of the Greens–European Free Alliance group.

== History ==
=== Formation and early years (2009–2011) ===
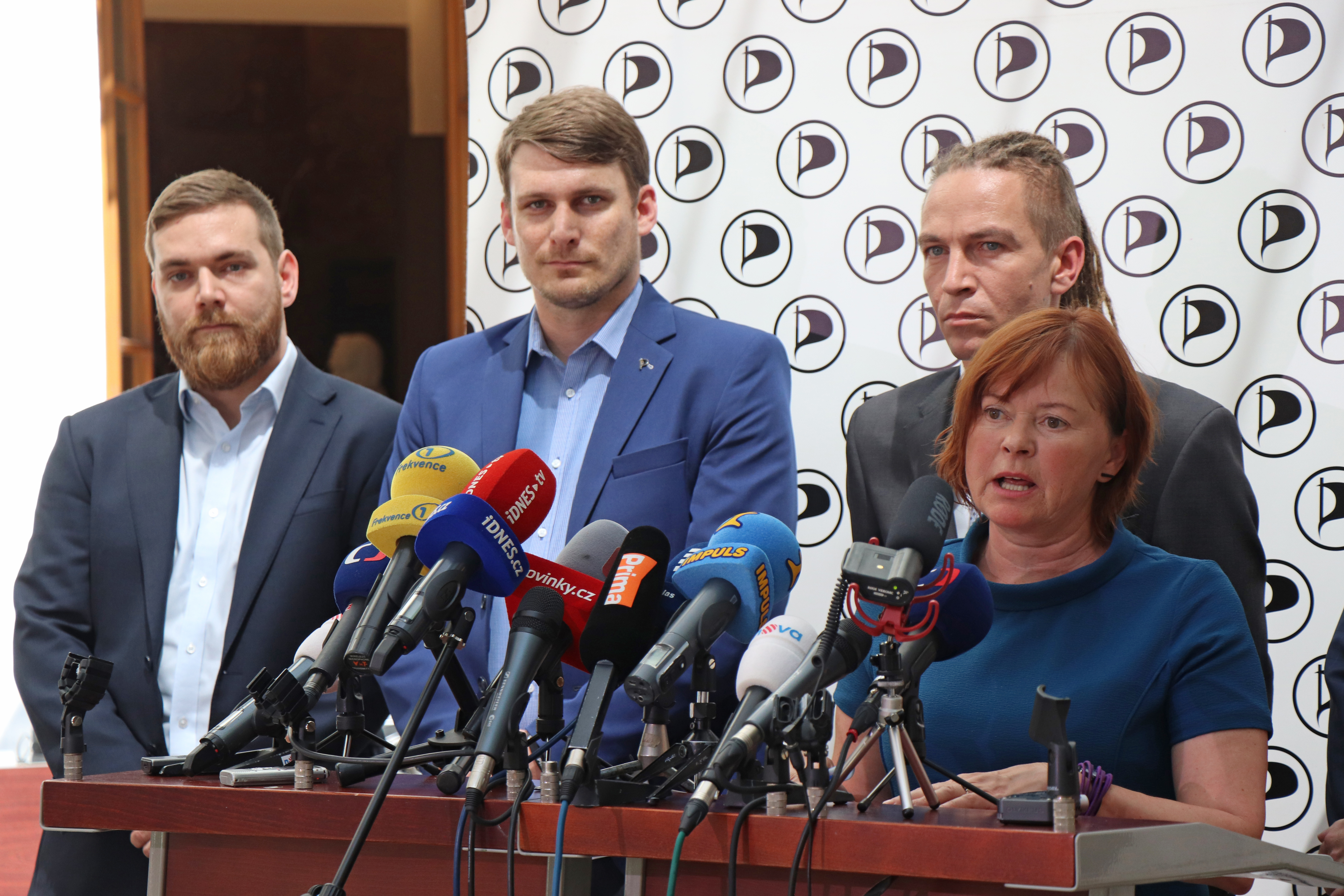
Deputies of the Parliament Tomáš Vymazal, Lukáš Kolářík, Ivan Bartoš and Dana Balcarová at a press conference in 2019

The Czech Pirate Party was founded as a student-driven grassroots movement campaigning for political transparency, civil rights and direct democracy. The party was initially inspired by the Swedish Pirate Party, which like most other Pirate Parties was a single-issue party focusing on Internet freedom; however, the Czech Pirate Party has developed a broad political platform.

On 27 May 2009 an application was submitted to the Ministry of the Interior for registration of the party. On 17 June, the party was registered under the code MV-39553-7/VS-2009. Within the first two days of the launch of their website in April, 1,800 people had signed an online petition to register the party. Czech law requires a paper petition with 1,000 signatures for registration. In the student elections, the Pirate Party received 7.7% of the vote.

On 28 June 2009 the party held a constitutive forum in Průhonice, near Prague, where the board was elected and main elements of the program were declared. Kamil Horký was elected as chairman. At the end of October 2009 in Albrechtice nad Orlicí, the General Assembly (GA) met for the first time, to complete statutes and elect a new board, commission and committee. Ivan Bartoš became party chairman.

The party participated in the general election in May 2010, and received 0.8% of the vote.

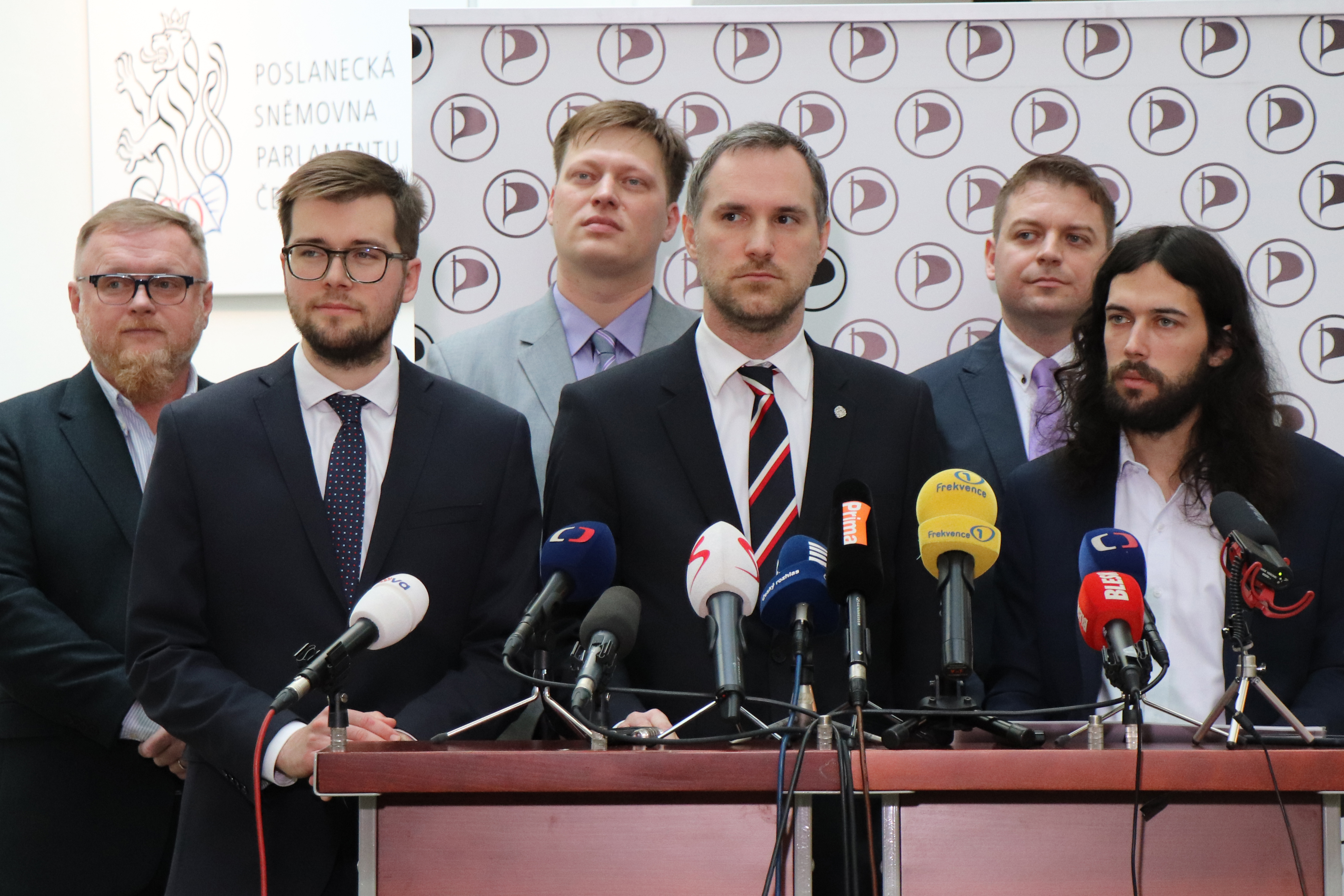
Following the 2018 Prague municipal election, the party formed a governing coalition and Zdeněk Hřib (front center) was elected Mayor of Prague.

In December 2010, the party launched its own national whistle-blowing site similar to WikiLeaks, called PirateLeaks. The site was intended as a primary source for journalists, dedicated to evidence of corruption in the Czech government and public administration documents which should be publicly available according to law 106/1999 Sb. (Free Access to Information Act) but which the authorities refused to disclose without a formal request defined by the law.

=== Parliamentary party (from 2011) ===
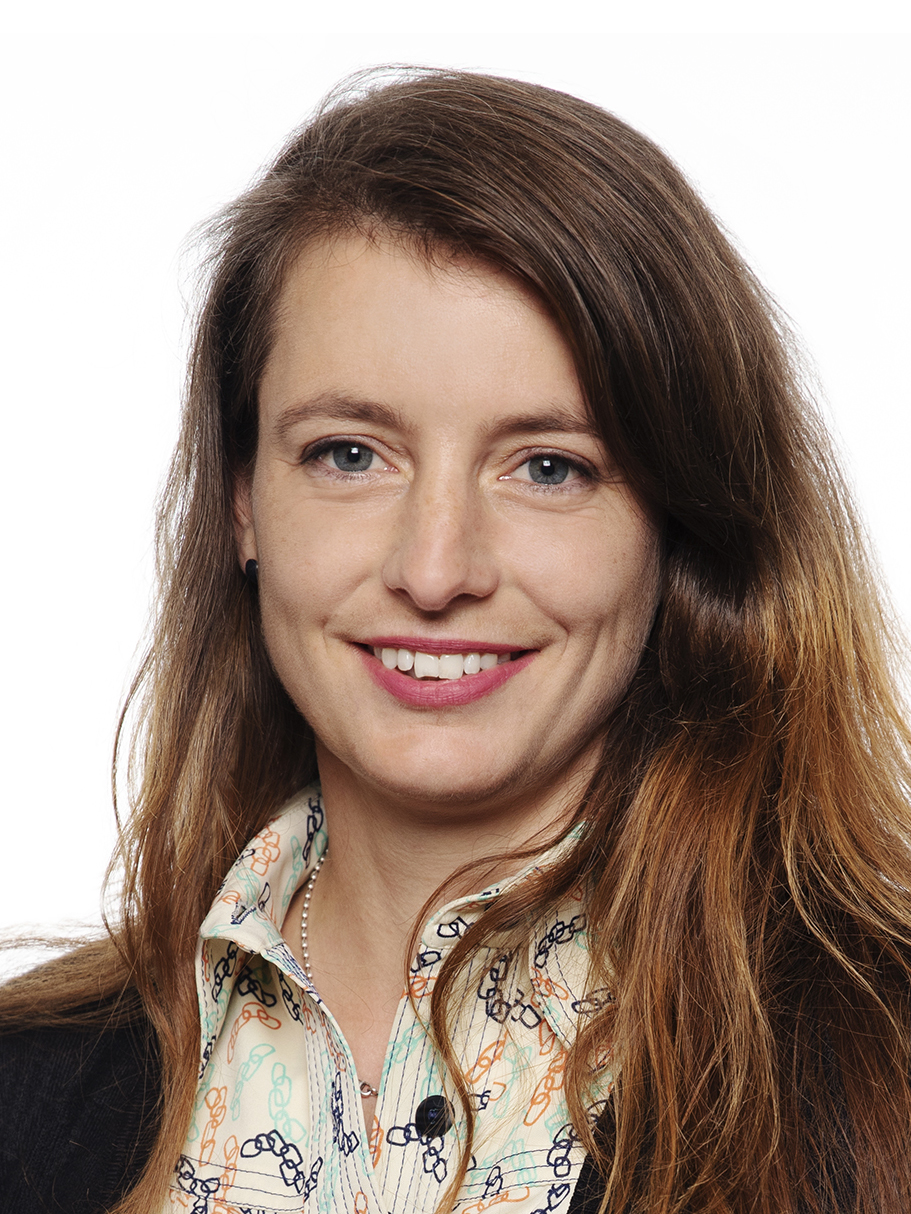
In October 2020, attorney Adéla Šípová was elected to become the youngest Senator in the history of the Parliament.

Standing in a local senate election on 18–19 March 2011 in Kladno, they obtained 0.75% of the vote. In the 2012 Czech Senate election, the Czech Pirate Party nominated three candidates; one of them was a co-nomination with two other parties. This candidate, the whistleblower Libor Michálek, was elected as Senator in the second round of voting, with the Czech Pirate Party becoming a parliamentary party for the first time.

In local elections in 2014 the party entered many local assemblies, including a clear majority in Mariánské Lázně, which resulted in Vojtěch Franta being elected as the party's first mayor. This city became the party's main stronghold outside Prague and its suburbs.

In the 2016 Senate election, the Pirates won two additional seats in the Senate with Ladislav Kos and Renata Chmelová, who were nominated by multi-party coalitions with the Pirates' support.

Following the 2017 parliamentary election, the party became the third largest party in the Chamber of Deputies with 22 out of 200 seats and sat in opposition to the ruling cabinet. Economist and auditor Lukáš Wagenknecht was elected Senator in the 2018 election, when Michálek's term ended.

The Pirates ranked second in the 2018 Prague municipal election with 13 out of 65 seats and formed a governing coalition with the third and fourth-ranked parties that holds 39 out of 65 seats in the Prague City Assembly. The leading Pirate candidate with 75,082 votes, Zdeněk Hřib, was elected as Mayor of Prague.

With leading candidate Marcel Kolaja in the 2019 European Parliament election, the party ran on a common platform with the European Pirate Party. Kolaja was elected along with Markéta Gregorová and Mikuláš Peksa as Members of the European Parliament. In May 2019, the party negotiated to join the Greens–European Free Alliance parliamentary group along with German Pirate Party MEP Patrick Breyer. In June, all four members of the European Pirate Party joined the parliamentary grouping. On 3 July, Kolaja was elected one of fourteen Vice-Presidents of the European Parliament.

In January 2020, Bartoš was re-elected as party leader. With 14.67% of the vote in the October 2020 regional elections, the party gained 99 out of 675 seats in regional councils. In the 2020 Senate election, the party nominated two successful candidates, David Smoljak and Adéla Šípová, who became the youngest ever member of the Senate at the age of 40, breaking the previous record of Pirate Senator Wagenknecht.

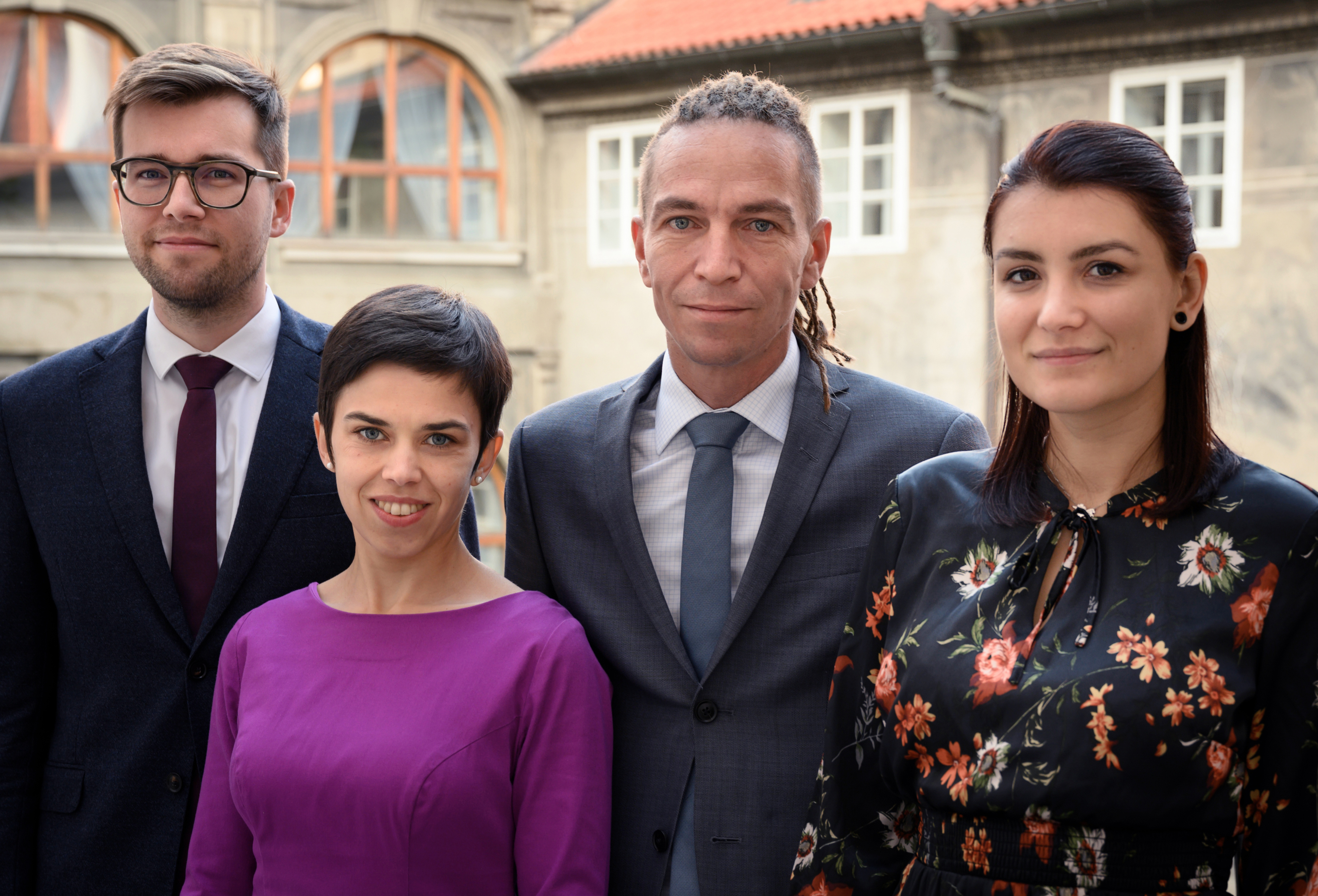
MPs elected in 2021, from left: Jakub Michálek, Olga Richterová, Ivan Bartoš, Klára Kocmanová

During late 2020 and early 2021, the Pirates formed the Pirates and Mayors electoral alliance for the 2021 parliamentary election with liberal centre-right party Mayors and Independents (STAN). The alliance won 37 seats, of which four are Pirate MPs, and joined the governing coalition with Spolu. The party nominated three ministers for the incoming Cabinet of Petr Fiala: Ivan Bartoš as Minister of Regional Development and Digitalisation, Jan Lipavský as Minister of Foreign Affairs, and Michal Šalomoun as Minister of Legislation.

In September 2024, the Pirates left the governing coalition after Fiala dismissed Bartoš as regional development minister due to problems over a new digital system for issuing building permits. However, Lipavský left the party to stay as foreign minister.

In November 2024, Zdeněk Hřib was elected as party leader. In January 2026, Hřib was re-elected as party leader.

== Positions and objectives ==
=== Political spectrum and ideology ===
The Czech Pirate Party is a centrist to centre-left progressive liberal party within the context of politics of the Czech Republic. The party's leadership expressed that it considers the left–right political spectrum to be obsolete. The party itself describes its stance as economically centrist and socially liberal, in the context of Czech politics.

=== Domestic policy ===
The party's program focuses on safeguarding of civil liberties from state or corporate power through government transparency, accountability and anti-corruption measures, introducing elements of participatory democracy by enabling law proposals by the public through petitions and simplification of state bureaucracy through e-government.

The party proposes a lobby register and a lobbying law reform, measures to address tax avoidance of multinational corporations and limit capital outflow, a bank tax, the strengthening of the Czech National Bank's authority, prevention of financial speculation leading to financial crises and financial crime; and it is against any public bank bailouts.

The party has an environmental policy platform entitled "Ecology without ideology", which focuses on the elimination of fossil fuel subsidies, scientific research and development-based support for alternative energy (i.e. renewables and nuclear), sustainable materials management from product design to waste management, sustainable transport with a preference for public transport, and sustainable city planning and urban development.

The party's agricultural policy proposes support for small-scale farmers and community farms instead of subsidizing intensive farming and large agribusinesses. The program promotes biodiversity of crops, and forest management and land management that address the environmental impact of agriculture rather than subsidizing monoculture crops that cause land degradation and have a variety of unsustainable environmental impacts. The Pirates also propose to simplify the producer–consumer chain by supporting infrastructure for the sale of local and seasonal produce.

The party supports LGBT rights in the Czech Republic, including the legalisation of same-sex marriage.

In January 2019 it was reported that the party has proposed the eventual introduction of a universal basic income.

==== 2017 parliamentary electoral platform ====
The party's four main campaign policies in the run-up to the 2017 elections were:

- Control of power and government spending through transparency and accountability
- Simplification of state bureaucracy by introducing e-government
- Supporting small businesses and e-commerce, addressing capital outflow of foreign-owned companies and tax avoidance via offshore financial centres
- Safeguarding civil liberties, freedom of information, freedom of speech, democracy and increasing public participation in decision making (participatory democracy)

Furthermore, the Pirates announced policies on transport and logistics, finance, IT, culture, international relations, local development, defence, labour and social issues, industry and trade, justice, interior policy, education and science, healthcare, agriculture and the environment.

=== European Union and international relations ===
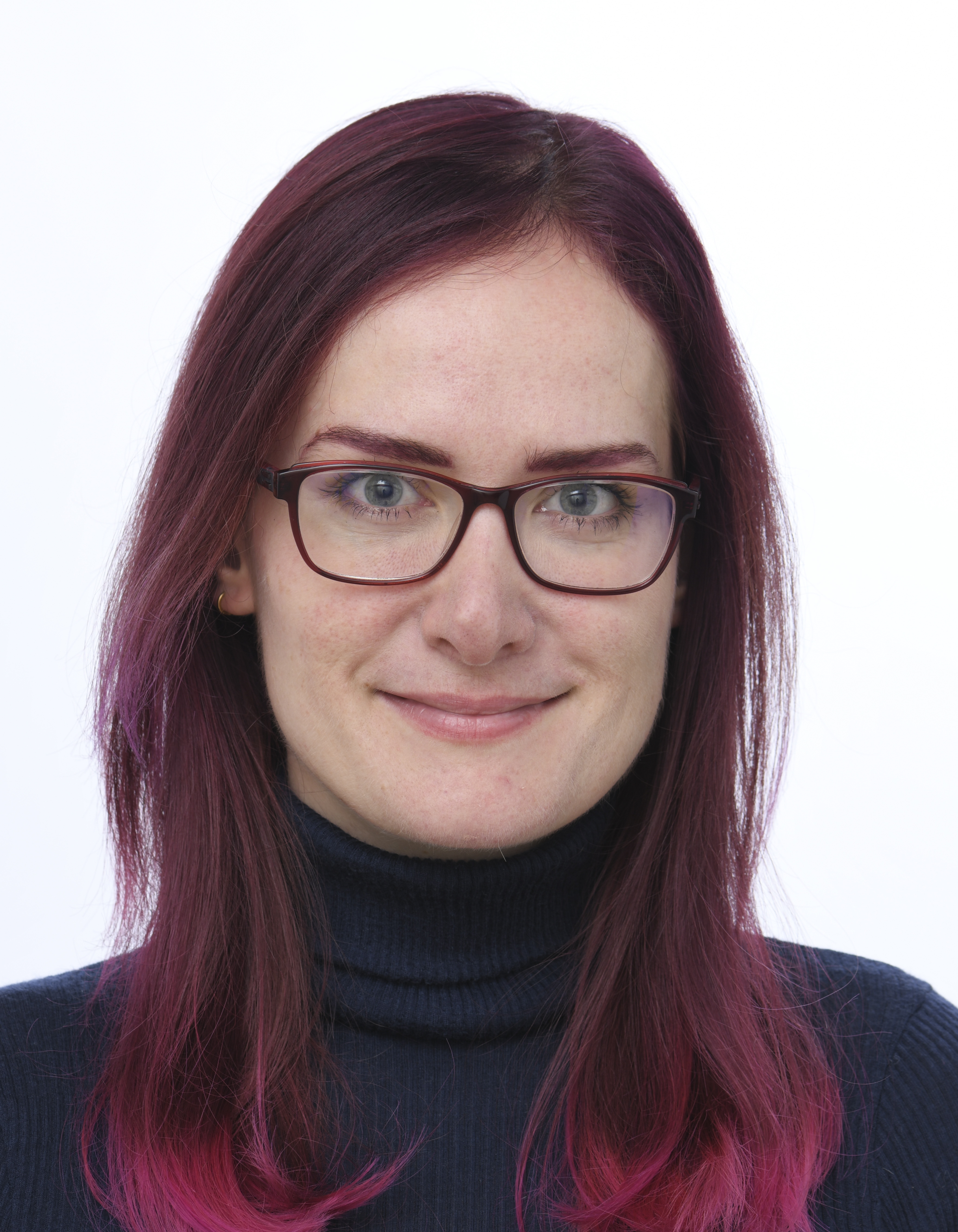
Pirate MEP Markéta Gregorová since the 2019 European Parliament election

The Czech Pirate Party is generally pro-European and pro-Eurozone, while advocating major reforms in both institutions to address the perceived democratic deficit in the European Union. The Pirates propose that the Czech Republic should participate in the mainstream of the European integration and should participate in EU decision making, but should adopt the Euro only if specific conditions are fulfilled. The party also supports Czech membership of NATO, but it is critical of aggression by NATO members and argues that any engagement of NATO forces outside of the territories of its member states should take place only if supported by a United Nations resolution. The party leadership has criticized military invasions by NATO and questioned the legality of the United States-initiated wars in Afghanistan and in Iraq and the 2011 military intervention in Libya by NATO forces.

Among the party's European priorities is technological competitiveness of the EU on the world market, limiting corporate lobbying in the EU and addressing Europe-wide tax avoidance by multinational corporations that offshore profits via tax havens. Furthermore, the party addresses digital rights and prevention of increasing Internet censorship; promotion of environmental protection and consumer protection. The Pirates oppose the Transatlantic Trade and Investment Partnership (TTIP).

==== 2019 European electoral platform ====
The program for the European Parliament elections in 2019 was published under the auspices of the European Pirate Party. Its core lies in addressing the democratic deficit in the European Union, decentralization and enacting of the subsidiarity principle: decision making on local and national affairs at the local levels of governance that are close to the citizens of the Member States. In addition to copyright reform or the digital agenda, it covers topics such as education, environment and agriculture, foreign policy, defense, transport and taxation and space programs. The party published its own European priorities in five points:

- Protecting European liberty against threats from the outside by strengthening EU defense capability, independence and external border; and against internal threats such as authoritarianism, extremism and censorship
- Making European decision-making transparent, decentralized, enabling citizen participation, subsidiarity, reducing EU bureaucracy
- Reform taxation of corporations, transparent management of the European budget, support for small and medium-sized businesses
- Addressing the causes of climate change and its impacts on the environment, addressing waste management and dependency on fossil fuels, sustainable development and support for rural areas and small farmers
- Consumer protection, support for social equality and protection of workers' rights

== International affiliations ==
The party is a member of Pirate Parties International and European Pirates (PPEU). Mikuláš Peksa is a board member of PPEU, and Vojtěch Pikal was a co-chairman of PPI in 2013 and 2014. In April 2012, the party organised a conference of the Pirate Parties International (PPI) in Prague. More than 200 representatives of Pirate parties from 27 countries attended, including the founder of the Pirate movement, Rick Falkvinge; writer Cory Doctorow; and Swedish MEP Amelia Andersdotter.

The party expressed support for the pan-European political movement Democracy in Europe Movement 2025 (DiEM25).

== Associated organisations ==
=== Young Pirates ===
The party's youth wing, "Young Pirates" (Czech: Mladé Pirátstvo), was founded in 2013 by Vojtěch Pikal, though it later became mostly inactive. The youth wing was relaunched in 2019. In 2021, the organisation changed its name from the masculine form Mladí Piráti into the current gender neutral form, in order to be equally inclusive to men and women.

=== Seniors on Board ===
The party's senior wing, "Seniors on Board" (Czech: Senioři na palubě, SnP) was founded in 2020 by Olga Richterová, and became active during the campaign for the 2021 election, aiming to create a program for seniors and dispel myths about the party. In July 2021, the wing had roughly 300 members, and their activities included English lessons and trips.

== Election results ==
=== Chamber of Deputies ===
Election	Leader	Votes	%	Seats	+/–	Position	Status
2010	Ivan Bartoš	42,323	0.81	0 / 200	Steady	▲11th	No seats
2013	Ivan Bartoš	132,417	2.66	0 / 200	Steady	▲9th	No seats
2017	Ivan Bartoš	546,393	10.79	22 / 200	▲22	▲3rd	Opposition
2021	Ivan Bartoš	839,776	15.62	4 / 200	▼18	▼7th	Coalition (2021–2024)
2021	Ivan Bartoš	839,776	15.62	4 / 200	▼18	▼7th	Opposition (2024–2025)
2021	Part of the Pirates and Mayors coalition, which won 37 seats in total						
2025	Zdeněk Hřib	504,537	8.97	18 / 200 (Note: With participation of the Green Party on party list, which won 2 seats in total.)	▲12	▲4th	Opposition

=== Senate ===
Election	Candidates	First round				Second round			Seats	Total seats	+/–
Election	Candidates	Votes	%	Runners-up	Place	Votes	%	Place	Seats	Total seats	+/–
2010	1	1,131	0.02	0 / 27	17th				0 / 27	0 / 81	Steady
2012	3	7,947	0.81	1 / 27	15th	11,807	2.30	6th	1 / 27	1 / 81	▲1
2014	4	5,454	0.53	0 / 27	19th				0 / 27	1 / 81	Steady
2016	4	7,352	0.83	2 / 27	17th				0 / 27	1 / 81	Steady
2018	12	63,132	5.80	3 / 27	8th	18,048	4.31	9th	1 / 27	1 / 81	Steady
2020	13	36,717	3.69	3 / 27	6th	18,804	4.61	7th	1 / 27	2 / 81	▲1
2022	8	28,302	2.54	0 / 27	9th				0 / 27	2 / 81	Steady
2024	5	21,107	2.66	0 / 27	8th				0 / 27	1 / 81	▼1
2026	3	24,563	2.13	1 / 27	8th	10,524	2.22	10th	0 / 27	0 / 81	▼1

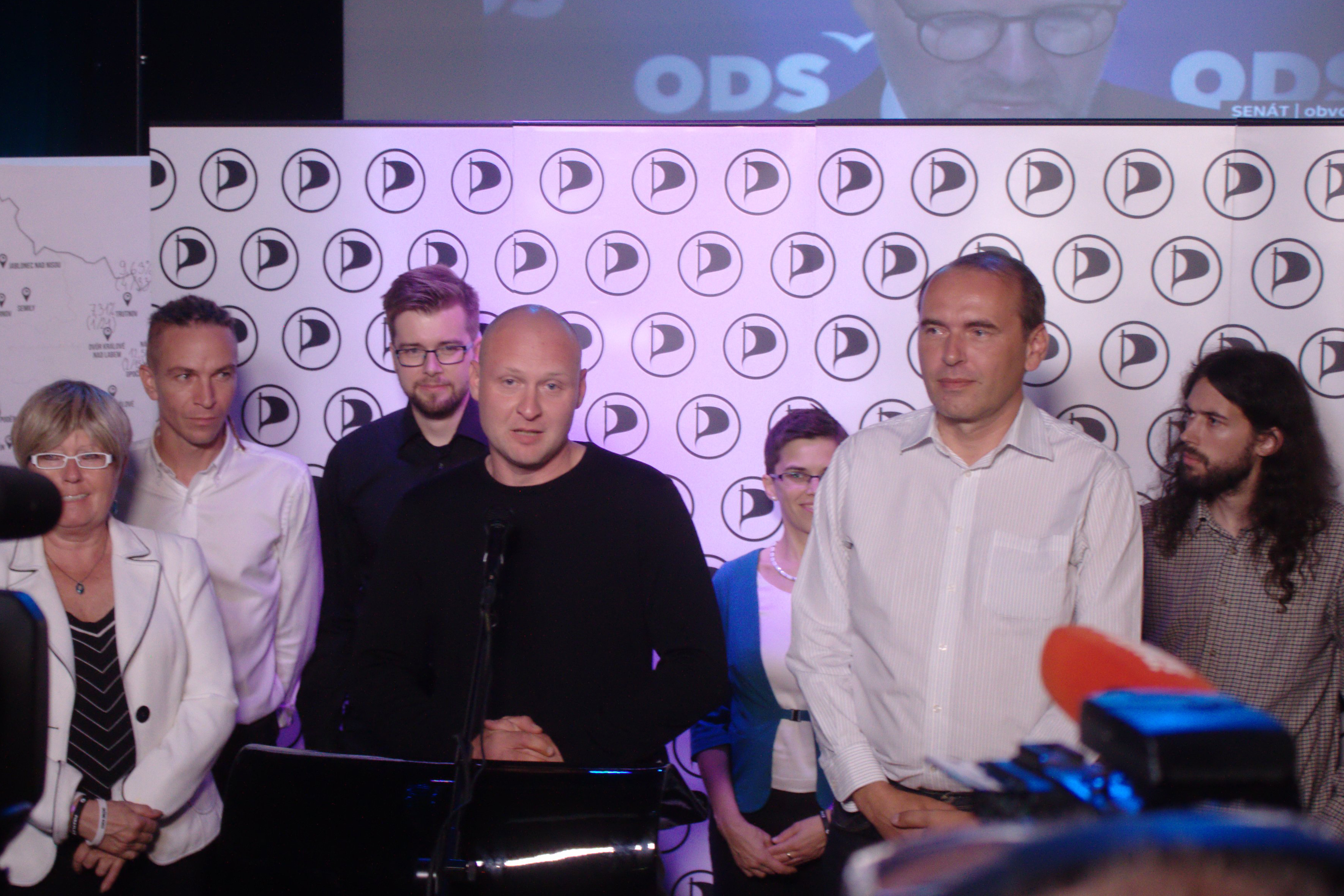
Economist and auditor Lukáš Wagenknecht (center) was elected Senator in the 2018 election, when the term of whistleblower Libor Michálek (front right) ended.

=== European Parliament ===
Election	List leader	Votes	%	Seats	+/−	EP Group
2014	Ivan Bartoš	72,514	4.78 (#8)	0 / 21	New	−
2019	Marcel Kolaja	330,844	13.95 (#3)	3 / 21	▲3	Greens/EFA
2024	Marcel Kolaja	184,091	6.20 (#6)	1 / 21	▼2	Greens/EFA

=== Regional councils ===
Election	Vote	%	Seats	+/–	Position
2012	57,805	2.19	0 / 675	New	▲29th
2016 (Note: Joint list with Greens in Hradec Králové Region)	44,070	1.74	5 / 675	▲5	▲24th
2020 (Note: Joint list with STAN in Olomouc Region)	333,413	14.67	99 / 675	▲94	▲2nd
2024	92,167	3.87	3 / 675	▼96	▼6th

=== Local elections ===
Election	Votes	%	Seats	+/–
2010	189,360	0.21	3 / 62,178	▲3
2014	1,321,908	1.23	21 / 62,300	▲18
2018	8,410,203	8.26	353 / 61,950	▲332
2022	7,107,001	6.62	279 / 61,780	▼79
2026	3,715,227	3.33	199 / 61,677	▼80

=== Prague City Assembly ===
Election	Leader	Votes	%	Seats	+/–	Position	Status
2010	Ivan Bartoš	32,901	0.9	0 / 65	New	▲10th	No seats
2014	Jakub Michálek	1,101,081	5.3	4 / 65	▲4	▲7th	Opposition
2018	Zdeněk Hřib	4,197,578	17.1	13 / 65	▲9	▲2nd	Coalition
2022	Zdeněk Hřib	4,180,324	17.7	13 / 65	Steady	▼3rd	Coalition
2026	Tereza Nislerová	2,305,338	9.4	7 / 65	▼5	▼5th	Opposition

Prague City Council members since 2018

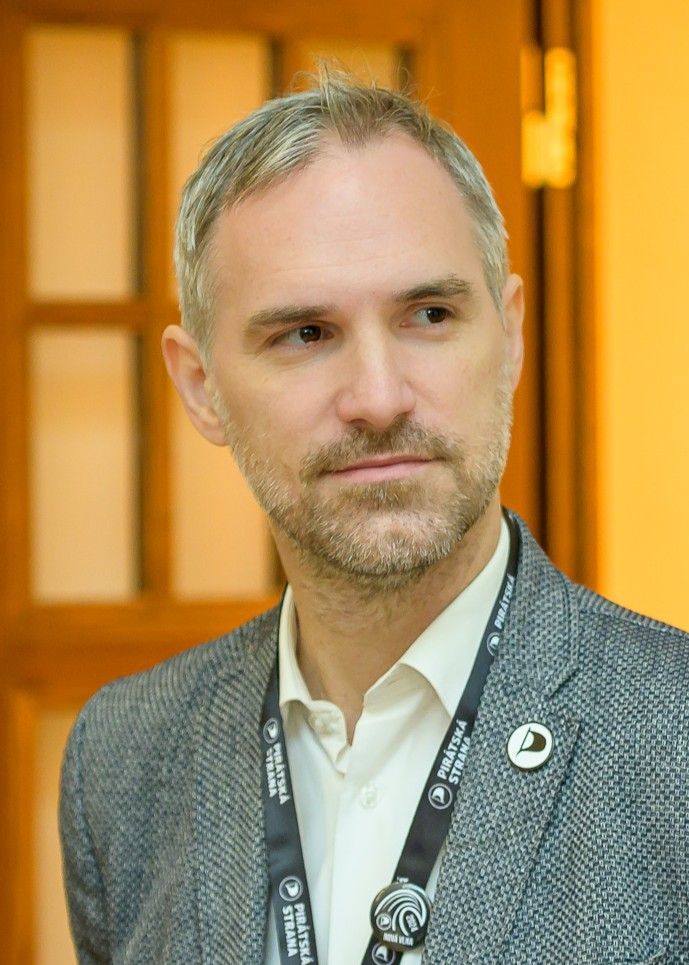
Zdeněk Hřib, party chairman

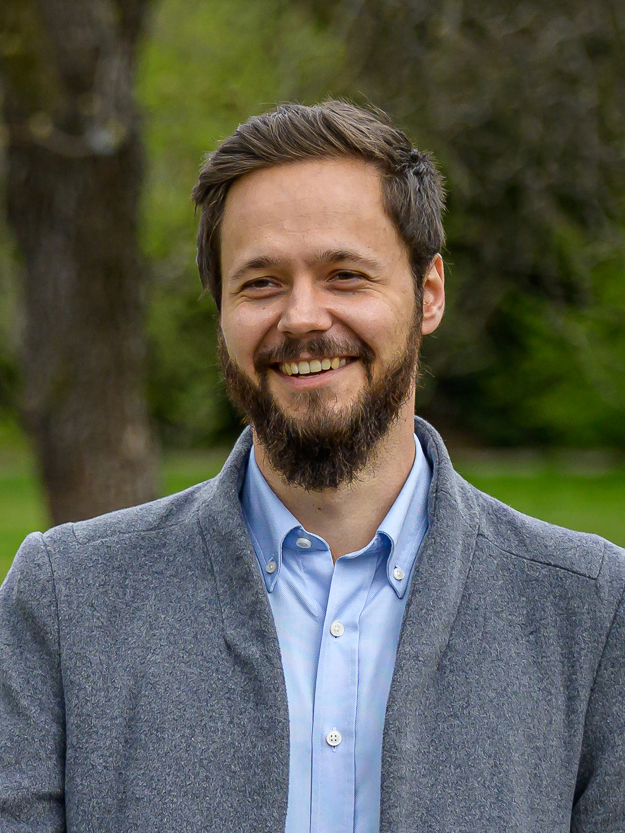
Adam Zábranský

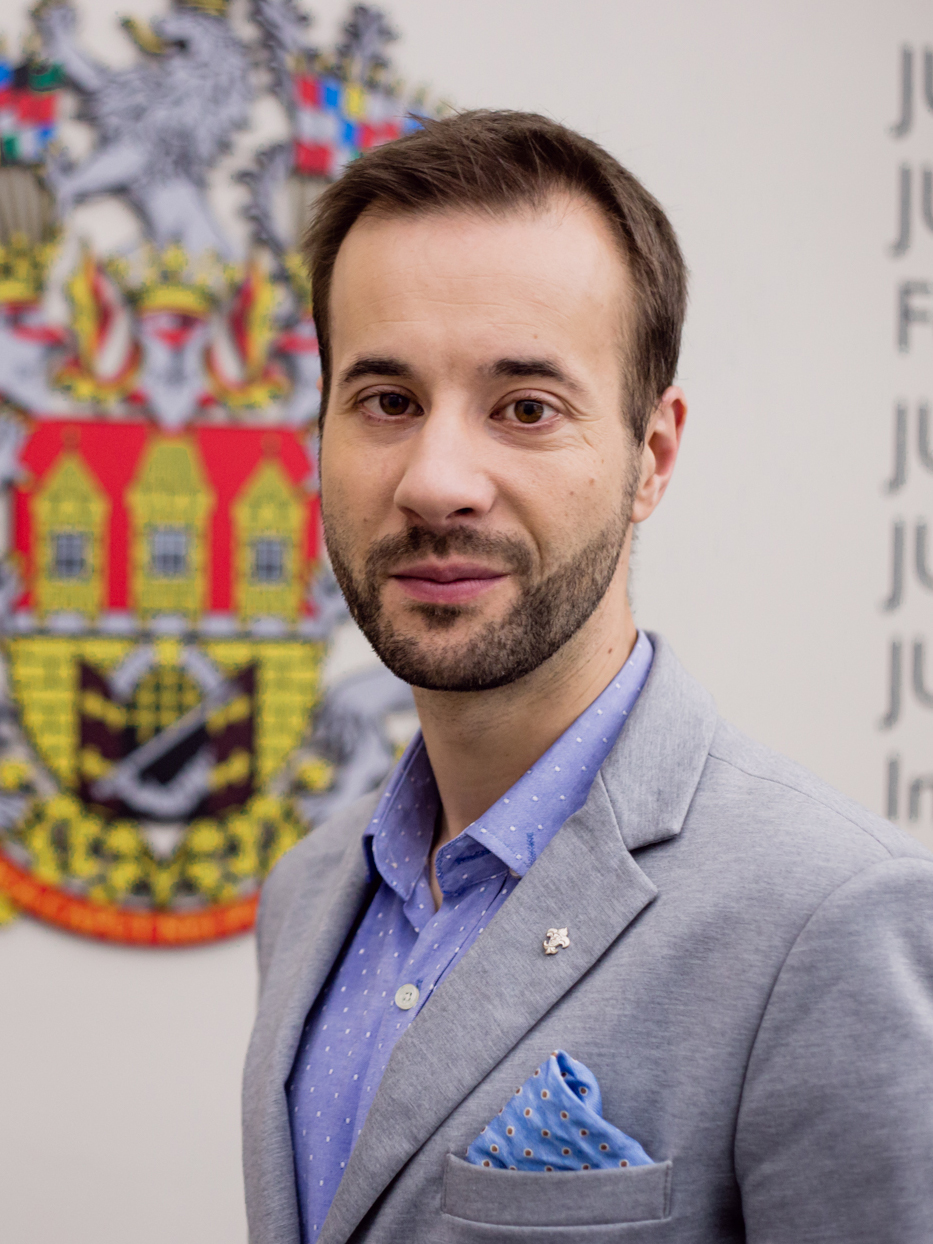
Vít Šimral
Member of the European Parliament (MEP) elected in 2024

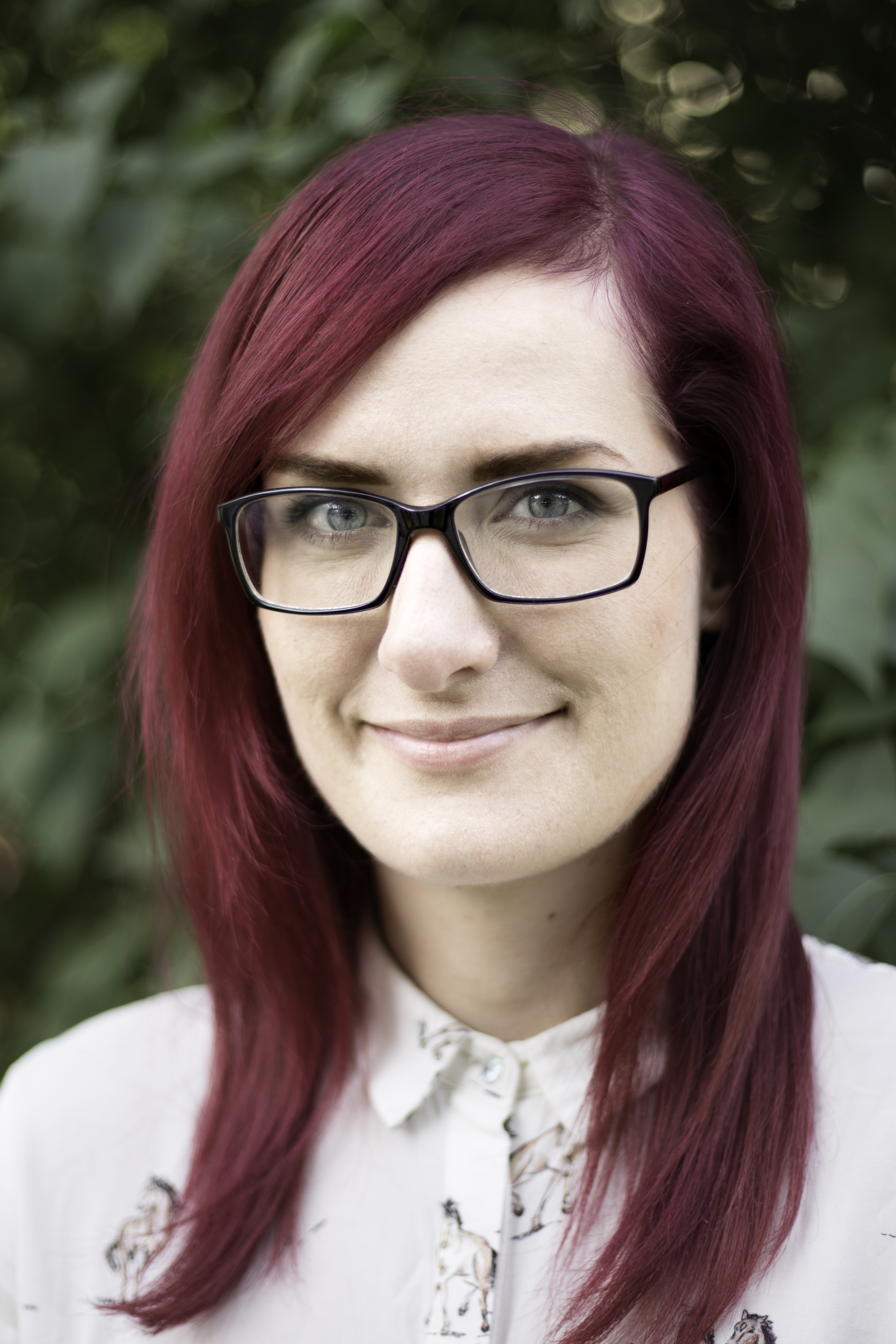
Markéta Gregorová

== Republic committee ==
=== Current vice-chairs ===
Position	Name
1st Vice chairman	Martin Šmída
2nd Vice chairwoman	Kateřina Stojanová
3rd Vice chairman	Jiří Hlavenka
4th Vice chairwoman	Olga Richterová

=== Chair history ===
Order	Name	Period
1.	Kamil Horký	2009
2.	Ivan Bartoš	2009–2013
3.	Jakub Michálek	2013
4.	Ivan Bartoš	2013–2014
5.	Lukáš Černohorský	2014–2016
6.	Ivan Bartoš	2016–2024
7.	Zdeněk Hřib	2024–present

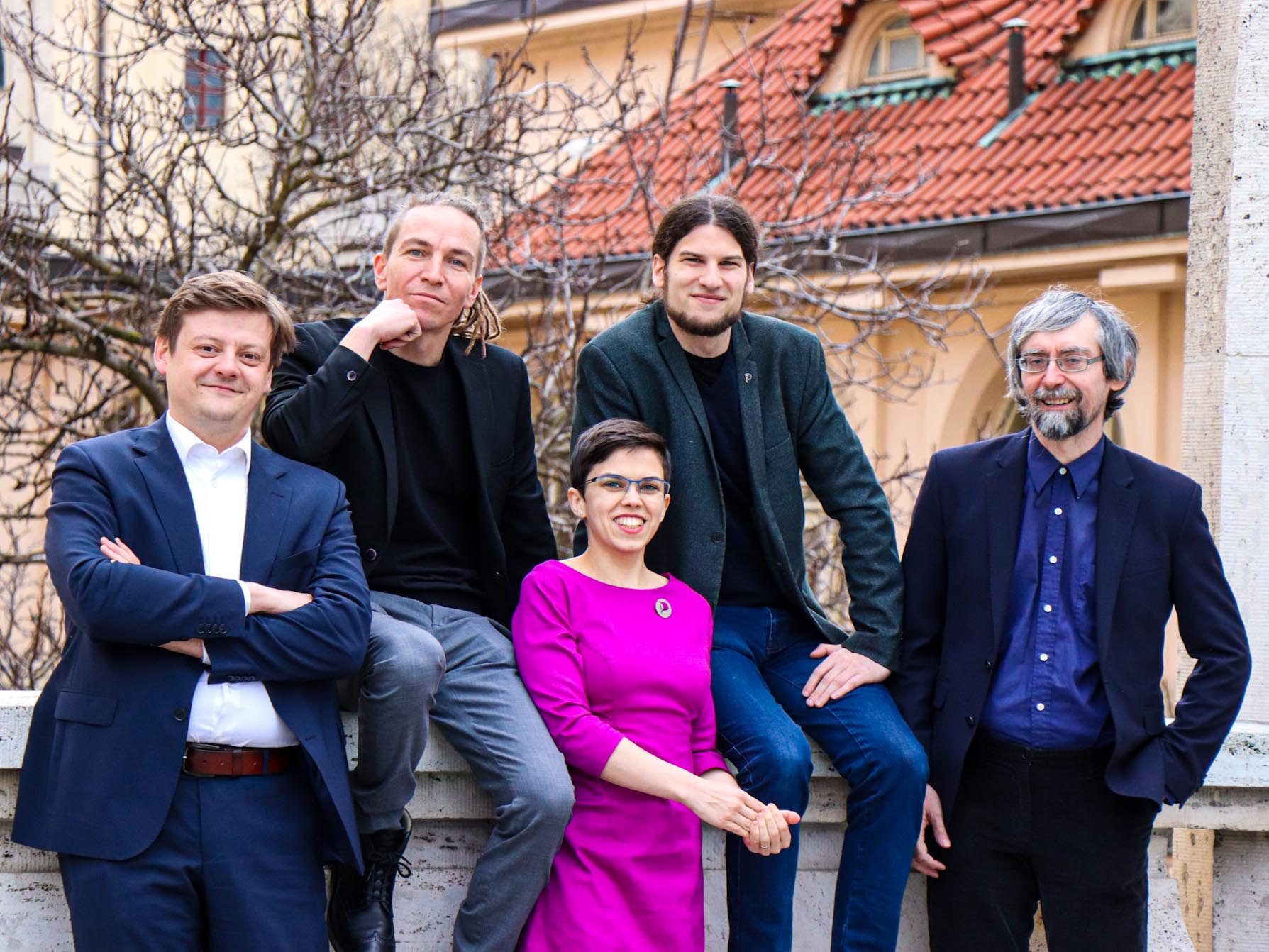
Members of the Republic committee in February 2020

== See also ==
- Civil libertarianism

== Literature ==
- Maškarinec, P. (2020). Crossing the left-right party divide? Understanding the electoral success of the Czech Pirate Party in the 2017 parliamentary elections. Politics. https://doi.org/10.1177/0263395720920768
- Naxera, Vladimír (2021). 'Let us blow them down!': Corruption as the subject of (non-)populist communication of the Czech Pirate Party. Politics. https://journals.sagepub.com/doi/full/10.1177/02633957211010984
- Šárovec, Daniel (2019) "Assured Newcomers on a Squally Sea? The Czech Pirate Party before and after the 2017 Elections" https://otik.uk.zcu.cz/handle/11025/36375?locale=en
