= 2026 Czech Pirate Party leadership election =

- 17 January 2026
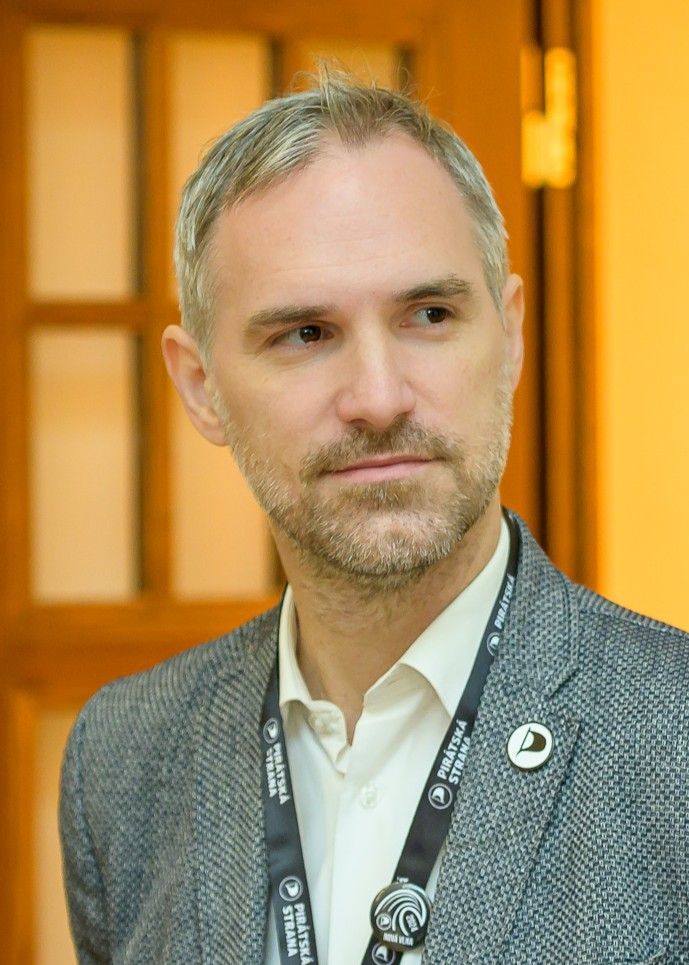

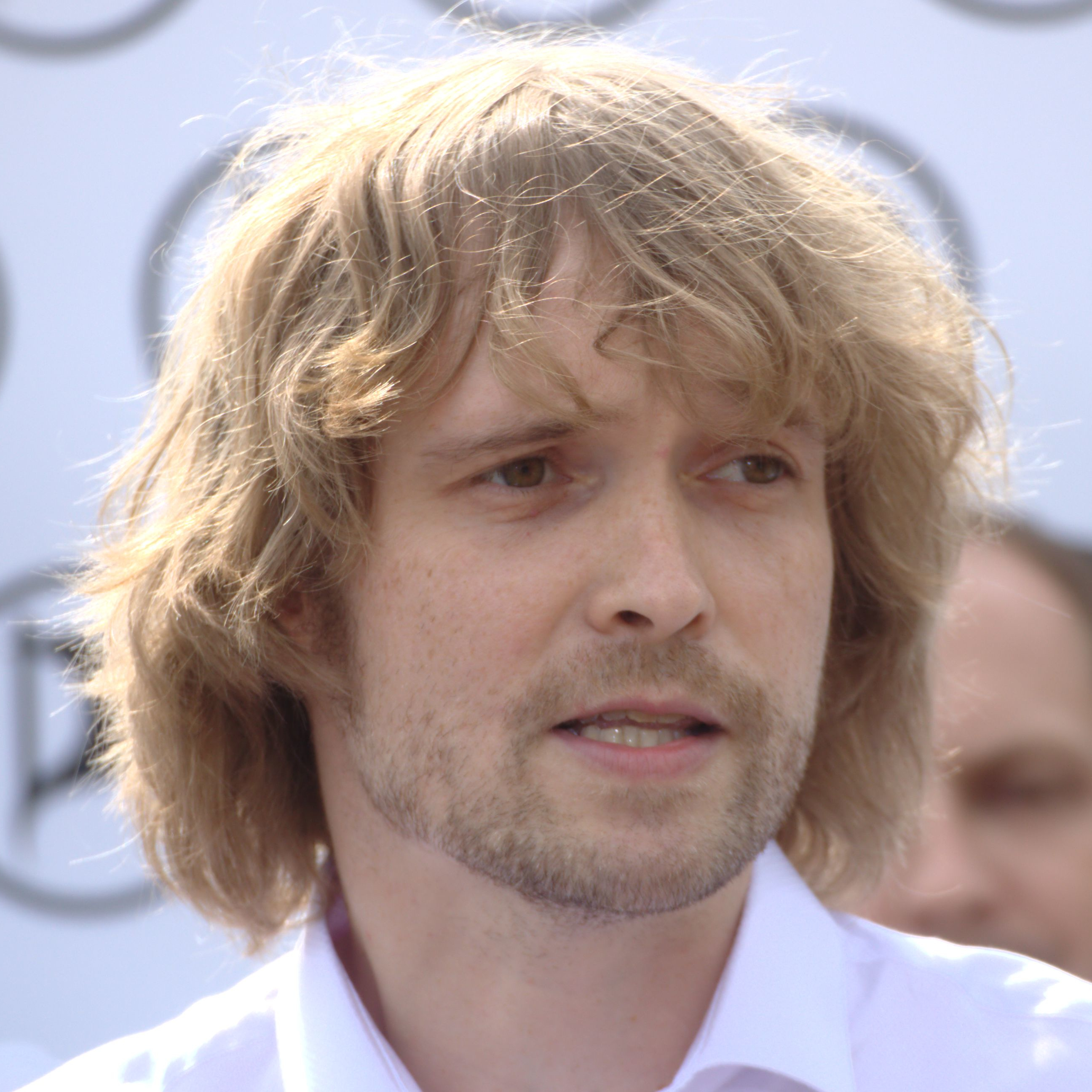
Candidate	Zdeněk Hřib	David Witosz
Popular vote	469	257
Leader of Pirates before election
Zdeněk Hřib
Elected Leader of Pirates
Zdeněk Hřib

The Czech Pirate Party held a leadership election on 17 January 2026.

== Background ==
The Czech Pirate Party has been led by Zdeněk Hřib since November 2024. Under his leadership, they became the fourth largest party in the Czech Republic after the 2025 parliamentary election, with 18 seats.

== Candidates ==
- Zdeněk Hřib, incumbent leader and MP.
- David Witosz, Deputy Mayor of the Moravská Ostrava and Přívoz municipal district.

== Result ==
Voting took place on 17 January 2026. In the first round, where each delegate could vote for as many candidates as they wanted, Hřib won a plurality with 469 votes of 611, while Witosz received 257. Hřib was re-elected.

Candidate	Vote
Zdeněk Hřib	469
David Witosz	257
