= Zdeněk Hřib =

Czech politician

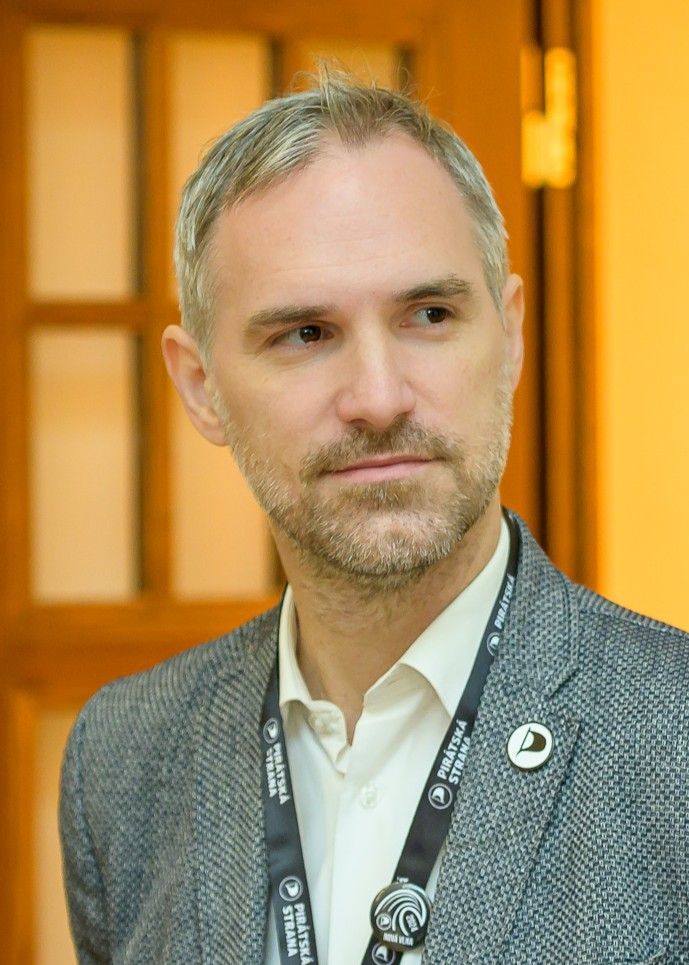
- Zdeněk Hřib in 2024

Mayor of Prague
- In office 15 November 2018 – 16 February 2023
- Preceded by: Adriana Krnáčová
- Succeeded by: Bohuslav Svoboda

Leader of the Czech Pirate Party
- Incumbent
- Assumed office 9 November 2024
- Preceded by: Ivan Bartoš

Member of the Chamber of Deputies
- Incumbent
- Assumed office 4 October 2025
- Constituency: Prague

Member of the Prague City Assembly
- Incumbent
- Assumed office 6 October 2018

Personal details
- Born: 21 May 1981 (age 45) Slavičín, Czechoslovakia (now the Czech Republic)
- Party: Czech Pirate Party
- Education: Charles University
- Occupation: Manager; physician
- Website: www.pirati.cz/lide/zdenek-hrib/

Zdeněk Hřib (born 21 May 1981) is a Czech healthcare manager and politician, who has served as chair of the Czech Pirate Party since November 2024, and served as the Mayor of Prague from November 2018 to February 2023.

Initially a physician, Hřib held managerial and consulting positions in state, corporate and non-profit healthcare entities dedicated to digitization, quality control, and consumer protection. He ran unsuccessfully in the 2014 Prague municipal election, but assumed office following the 2018 municipal election, where the Pirates finished second and formed a governing coalition with the third- and fourth-placed parties that held 39 out of 65 seats in the Prague City Assembly.

== Early life and career ==
Zdeněk Hřib was born on 21 May 1981 in Slavičín, near Zlín in the south-east of the Czech Republic. He studied medicine at Charles University in Prague and participated in a student exchange program in Taiwan.

Subsequently, Hřib held managerial positions in the healthcare industry, focusing on digitization of healthcare services. Since 2012, he has been the founding director of a non-profit organization that provides quality control, efficiency assessment and consulting for healthcare providers, as well as consumer protection for healthcare customers.

In 2013, Hřib became a registered supporter of the Czech Pirate Party, and ran unsuccessfully in the 2014 Prague municipal election.

== Political career ==
=== Mayor of Prague (2018–2023) ===
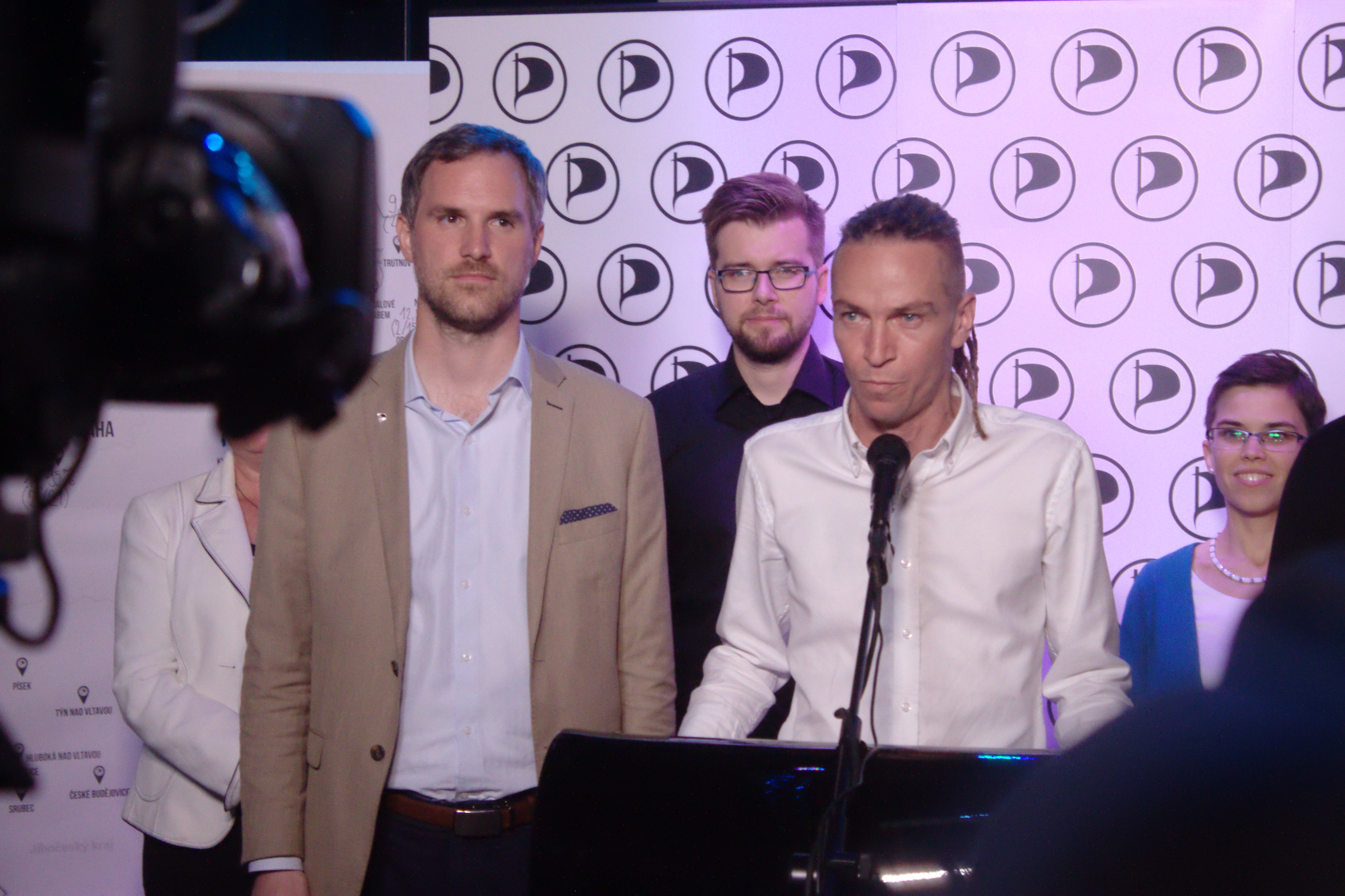
Hřib (left) at a 2018 press conference with party vice-chair Jakub Michálek, chair Ivan Bartoš, and vice-chair Olga Richterová

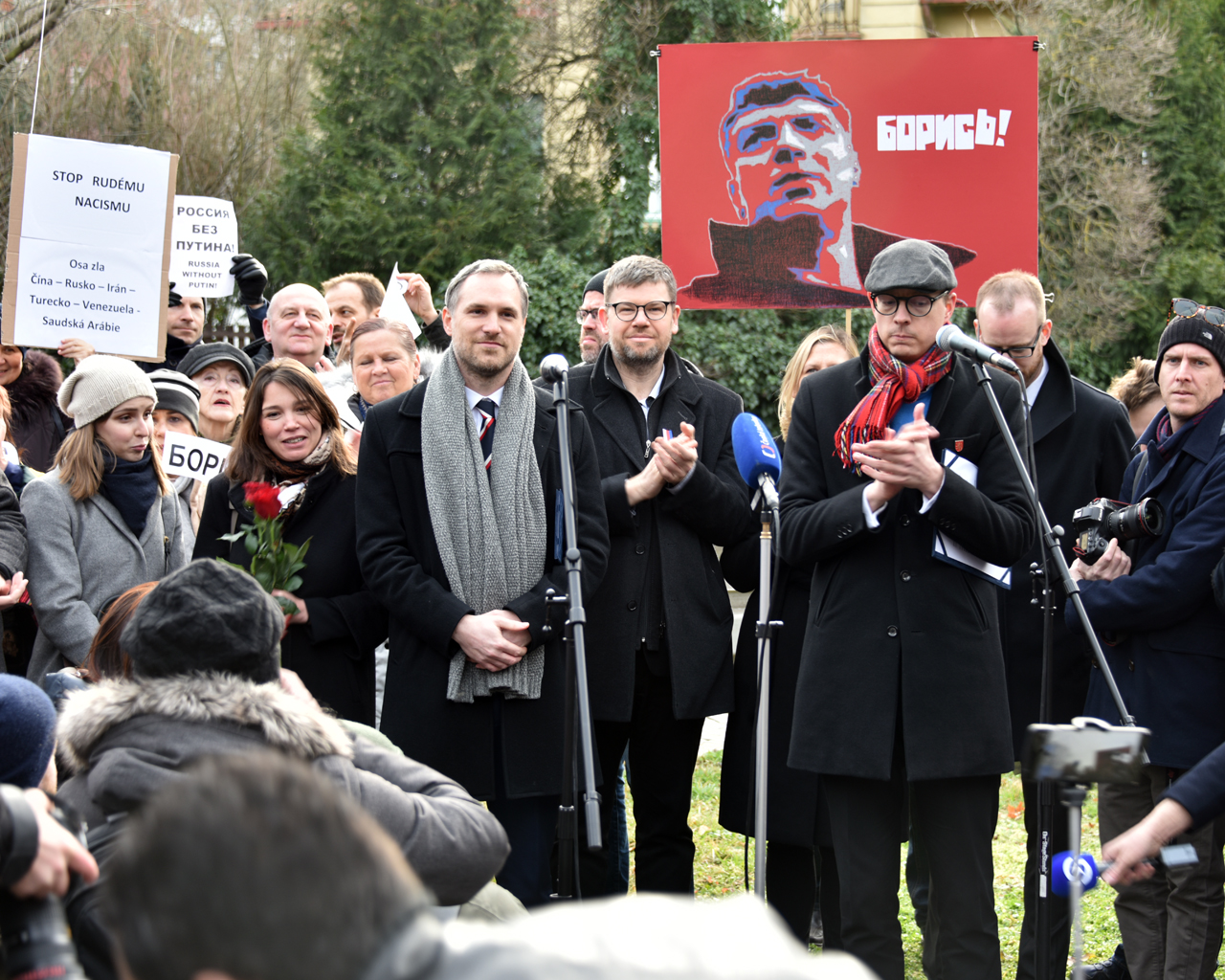
Hřib in Prague in February 2020 during the ceremonial renaming of a plaza after assassinated Russian dissident Boris Nemtsov

The Pirates finished second in the 2018 Prague municipal election, winning 13 out of 65 seats in the Prague City Assembly, and formed a governing coalition with the third- and fourth-placed lists which held 39 out of 65 seats. Hřib, as the leading Pirate candidate with 75,082 votes, was elected the Mayor of Prague on 15 November 2018 by the Prague City Assembly, taking over the office from Adriana Krnáčová.

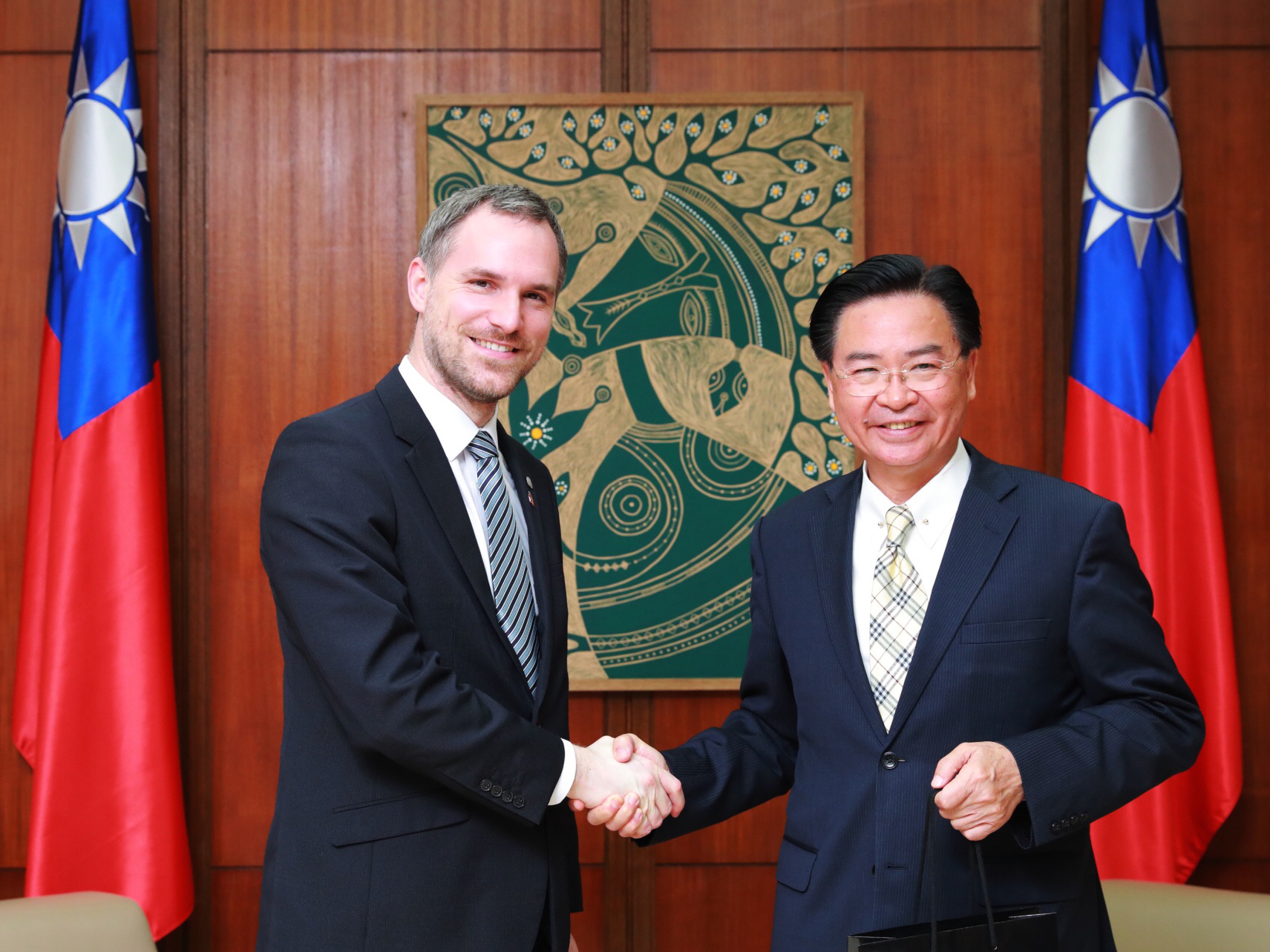
Hřib and Minister of Foreign Affairs of Taiwan Joseph Wu in April 2019

In 2018, during a meeting with foreign diplomats in Prague, Hřib was asked by the Chinese ambassador to the Czech Republic to expel the representative of Taiwan, but refused to do so. He criticized a clause of the sister city agreement between Prague and Beijing that contained references to the One-China principle, stating that the policy is "a complicated matter of foreign politics between two countries" and therefore "has no place in the sister cities agreement". Hřib also subsequently criticized the retaliatory decision by the Chinese government to cancel a planned tour of China by the Prague Philharmonia as a politicization of culture. According to The Guardian, Hřib was responsible for restoring the "Czech Republic's image as a champion of human rights". Hřib visited Taiwan twice as the Mayor of Prague, first in 2019 and again in 2020.

On 17 January 2019, Hřib appealed to the city council to name a street in Prague in honor of Paweł Adamowicz, the former mayor of Gdańsk in Poland who was assassinated on 13 January 2019. On 5 June 2019, the street in Riegrovy Sady park named after Adamowicz was officially inaugurated. He renamed the square in front of the Russian embassy "Boris Nemtsov Square" in February 2020.

In December 2019, Hřib was among the four mayors of Visegrád Group capitals Prague, Warsaw, Bratislava and Budapest, who signed the Pact of Free Cities, agreeing to protect "common values of freedom, human dignity, democracy, equality, rule of law, social justice, tolerance and cultural diversity".

In April 2020, Hřib was placed under police protection after reports of an alleged Russian plot to poison him and other Prague politicians with ricin. The Security Information Service (BIS) stated that the information had originated from an internal communication between employees of the Russian embassy in Prague. The Czech government subsequently expelled two Russian diplomats.

=== Leader of the Pirate Party (2024–present) ===
In November 2024, Hřib was elected as leader of the Pirate Party. He led the party into the 2025 parliamentary election, and was elected as a member of the Chamber of Deputies for Prague.

== Personal life ==
Hřib is a gun owner authorized to carry a firearm for protection.

Political offices
Preceded by Adriana Krnáčová	Mayor of Prague; 2018–2023	Succeeded by Bohuslav Svoboda
