= Machalek =

Machalek is a surname, a variant of Michálek. Notable people with the surname include:

- Richard Machalek (born 1946), American sociologist
- Miloslav Machálek (born 1961), Czech football manager
- Marzena Machałek (born 1960), Polish politician
