= Michayluk =

Surname list

Michayluk (Ukrainian: Михайлюк) is a Ukrainian surname. Notable people with the surname include:

- Dave Michayluk (born 1962), Canadian ice hockey player
- Demitro Michayluk (1911–1990), Canadian educator and political figure

== See also ==
- Michaluk
