= Michaluk =

Surname list

Michaluk is the surname of the following people

- Art Michaluk (1923-2006), Canadian professional ice hockey defenceman
- John Michaluk (1928-1998), Canadian professional ice hockey left winger
- John Michaluk (born c. 1942), Canadian football player

== See also ==
- Michálek
