= Kateřina Stojanová =

Czech politician (born 1998)

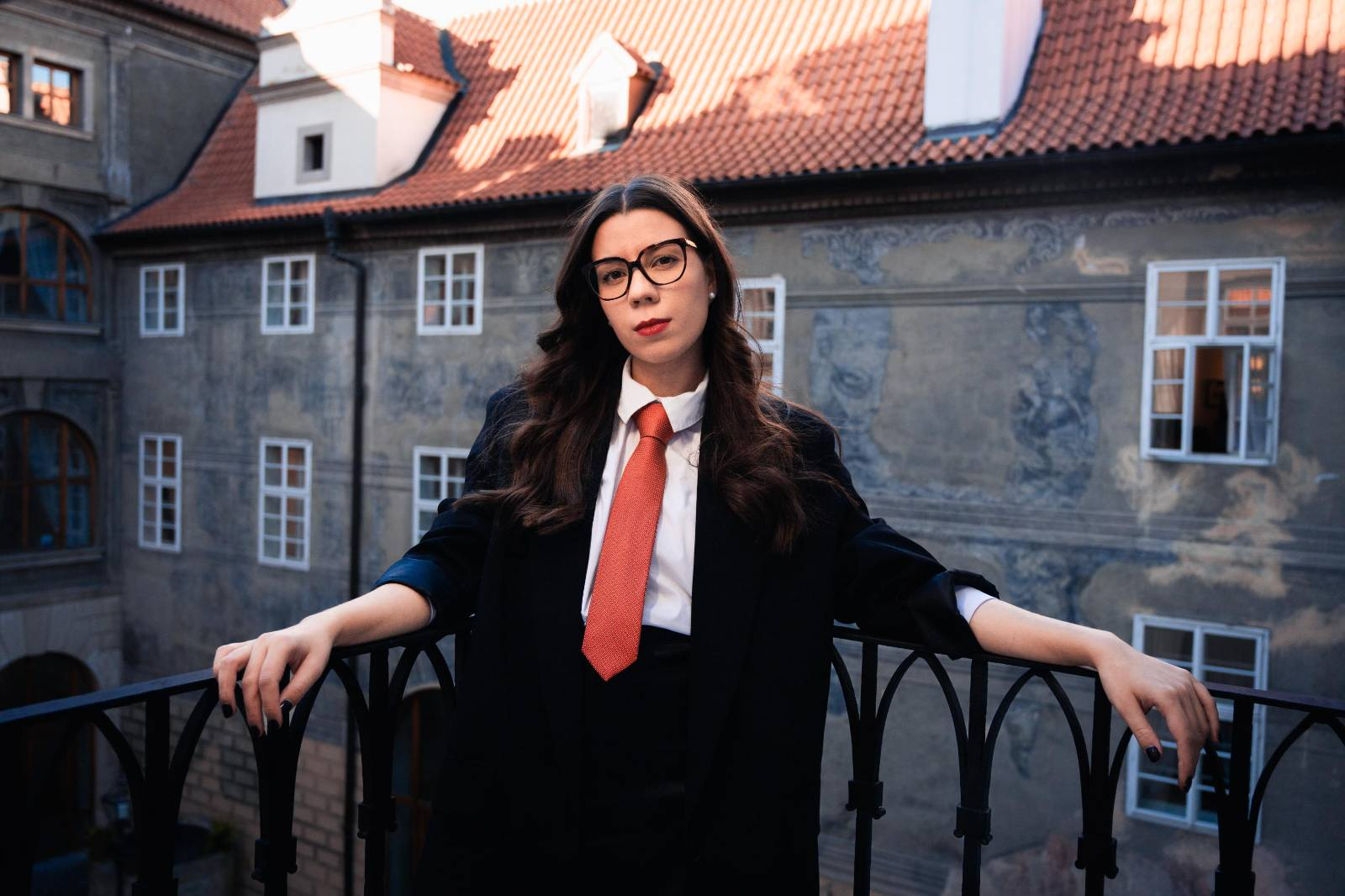
- Kateřina Stojanová

Member of the Chamber of Deputies
- Incumbent
- Assumed office 4 October 2025
- Constituency: Ústí nad Labem Region

Vice-chairwoman of the Czech Pirate Party
- Incumbent
- Assumed office 17 January 2026
- Preceded by: Hana Hajnová

Personal details
- Born: 28 July 1998 (age 28) Litoměřice, Czech Republic
- Party: Pirate Party
- Education: Charles University

Kateřina Stojanová (born 28 June 1998) is a Czech politician serving as a member of the Chamber of Deputies since 2025. From 2020 to 2024, she was a member of the regional council of Ústí nad Labem.
