= Dana Balcarová =

Czech politician (born 1960)

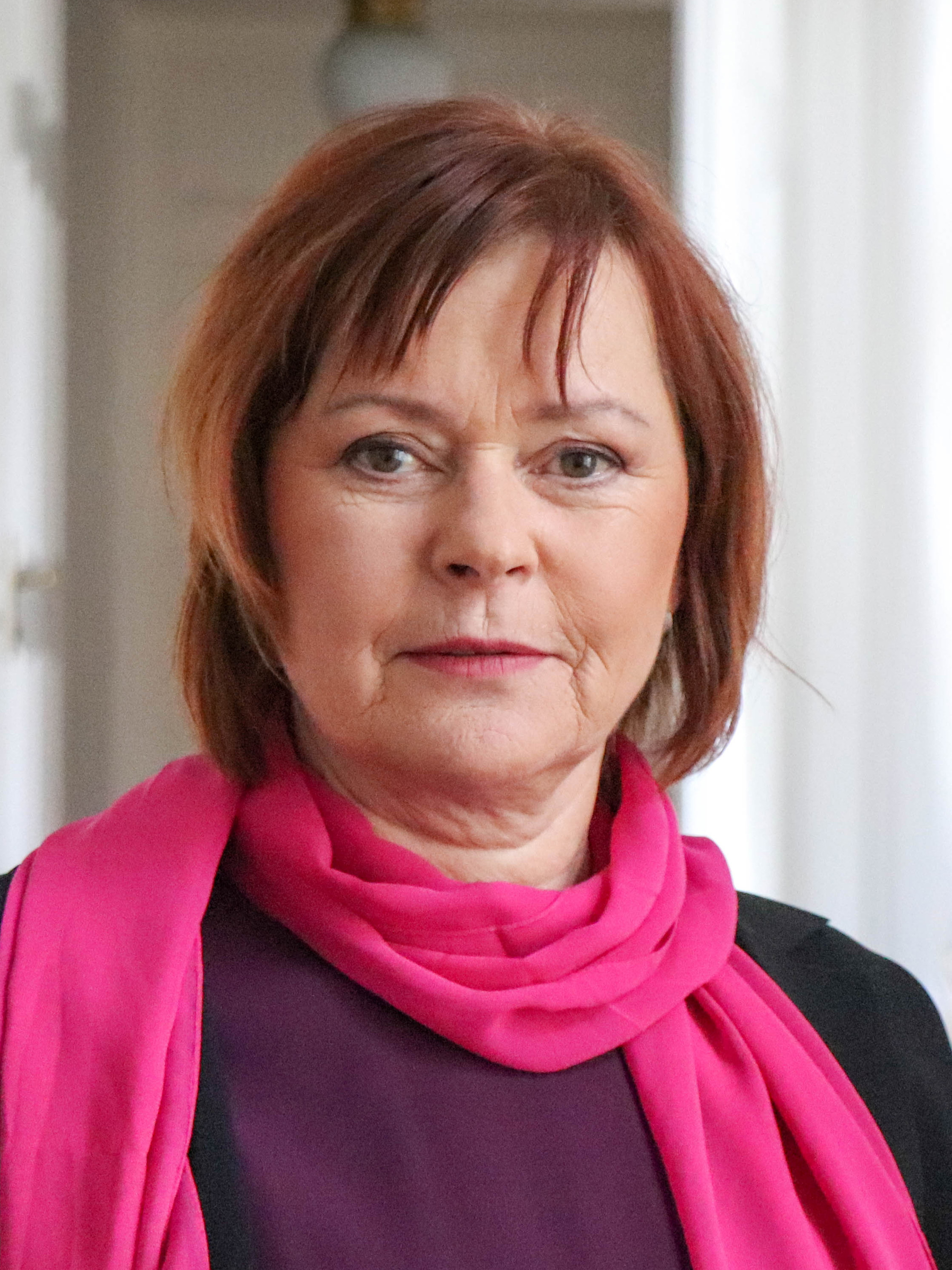
- Balcarová in 2018

Prague 9 Council member
- In office 21 October 2017 – 21 October 2021

Member of the Chamber of Deputies
- In office 11 October 2014 – 6 October 2018

Personal details
- Born: 22 September 1960 (age 65) Pardubice, Czechoslovakia
- Party: Czech Pirate Party (2015–present)
- Education: Prague University of Economics and Business

Dana Balcarová (born 22 September 1960) is a Czech manager, environmentalist and politician, a member of the Chamber of Deputies of the Parliament of the Czech Republic from 2017 to 2021, a representative of the Prague 9 district from 2014 to 2018, a member of the Czech Pirate Party.

== Early life ==
Balcarová was born on 22 September 1960 in Pardubice. She studied computer technology at SPŠE Pardubice and computer science at the University of Economics in Prague (she graduated in 1985 and obtained the degree of Ing.). She also received an additional education in the field of environmental economics at the University of Economics in Prague.

She worked in several companies, where she worked at the managerial level on information systems and databases (Lidové noviny, Czech Environmental Inspectorate, Scio, civic association Hestia). Since 2006, she has been the vice-chairwoman of the Krocan initiative in Prague 9, where she focuses on green protection, civic events and territorial development.

Dana Balcarová has lived in Prague since 1979.

== Political influence ==
In the municipal elections in 2014, she ran as a non-partisan for the Pirate Party in the Prague City Council, but failed. At the same time, however, she was elected a representative of the Prague 9 district, as a non-partisan for the Greens on the candidate of the SZ Troika Coalition, KDU-ČSL, NK. In the elections in 2018, she no longer defended the mandate of the district representative.

In 2015, she became a member of the Pirate Party. In the elections to the Chamber of Deputies of the Parliament of the Czech Republic in 2017, she was elected a second-place candidate in Prague.

Following her election as a Member of Parliament, she was elected Chair of the Environment Committee in November 2017. She considers climate change and sustainable development to be his profile topics in particular. In 2021, the deputy did not defend her mandate. The daily Referendum was Dana Balcarová as one of the Czech personalities of 2019.

In the elections to the Chamber of Deputies of the Parliament of the Czech Republic in 2021, she ran as a member of the Pirates in 12th place as a candidate of the Pirates and Mayors coalition in Prague, but she was not elected. She thus failed to defend her mandate.
