= Olga Richterová =

Czech linguist, translator and politician

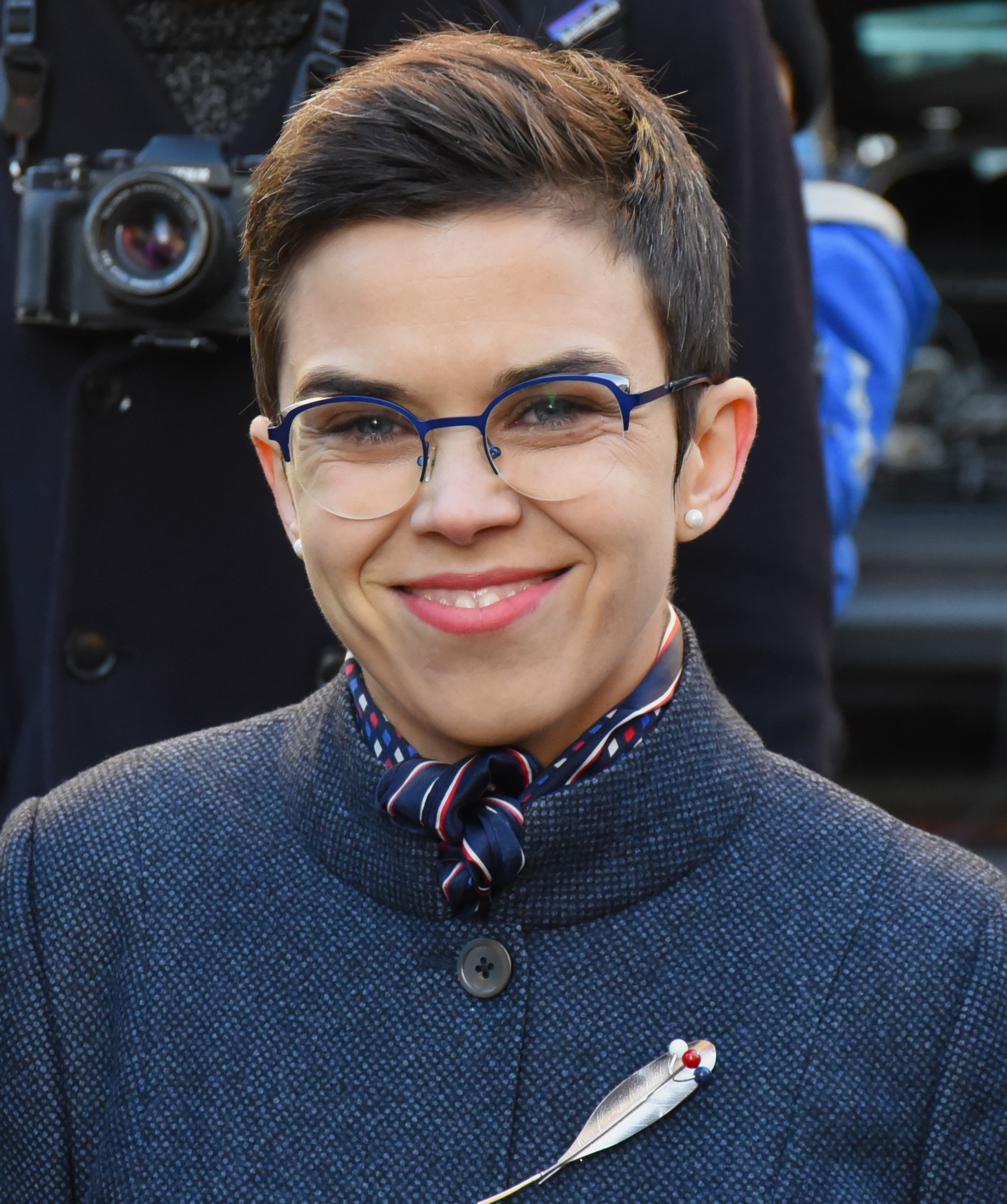
- Richterová in 2023

Prague 10 Council member
- In office 11 October 2014 – 11 October 2018

Member of the Chamber of Deputies
- Incumbent
- Assumed office 21 October 2017

1st Vice-chairwoman of the Czech Pirate Party
- In office 6 January 2018 – 8 January 2022
- Preceded by: Marcel Kolaja
- Succeeded by: Vojtěch Pikal

Deputy President of the Chamber of Deputies
- In office 10 November 2021 – 8 October 2025

Vice-chairwoman of the Czech Pirate Party
- Incumbent
- Assumed office 10 December 2024
- Preceded by: Dominika Poživilová Michailidu

Leader of the Czech Pirate Party in the Chamber of Deputies
- Incumbent
- Assumed office 5 October 2025
- Preceded by: Jakub Michálek

Personal details
- Born: 21 January 1985 (age 41) České Budějovice, Czechoslovakia
- Party: Czech Pirate Party
- Education: Charles University

Olga Richterová (born 21 January 1985) is a Czech linguist and politician. She was the vice-chairwoman of the Czech Pirate Party from January 2018 to January 2022 and is a member of the Chamber of Deputies of the Czech Republic since the 2017 parliamentary election. Richterová was re-elected in the October 2021 Czech parliamentary election on a joint list of the Pirates and Mayors electoral alliance and became a vice-president of the Chamber of Deputies.

== Life and career ==
Richterová was born on 21 January 1985 in České Budějovice in southern Bohemia and grew up in Choltice in the Pardubice Region. She studied linguistics, English and German translation at the Faculty of Arts, Charles University in Prague. Richterová joined the Czech Pirate Party in 2014 and served as a councillor in the Prague 10 district from 2014 to 2018. She was then elected to the Chamber of Deputies in the 2017 parliamentary election. Her political agenda has focused on housing legislation, social policy and urban planning policy. She serves as the vice-chairwoman of the parliamentary Committee on Social Policy from 19 December 2017.

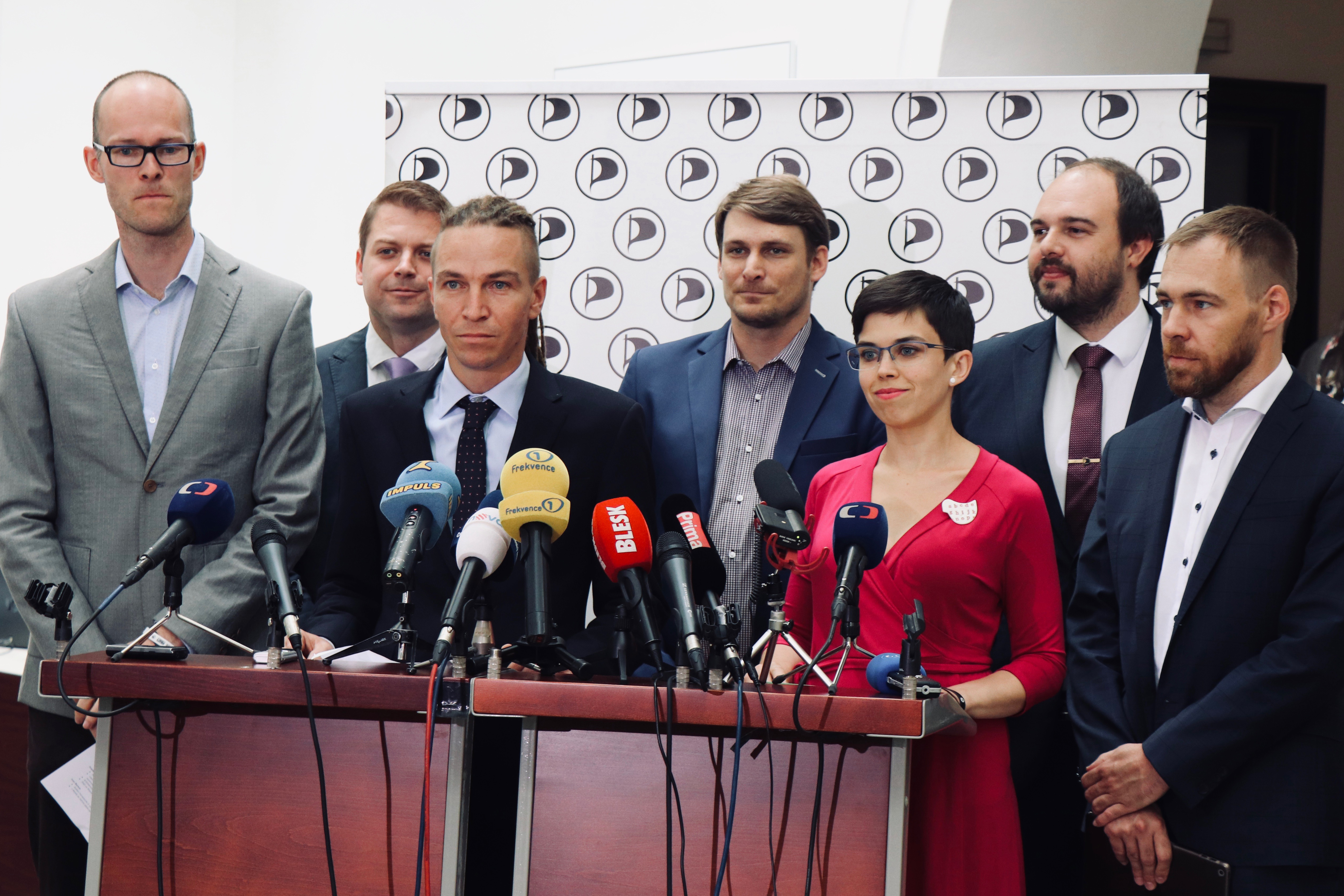
Richterová among party members at a press conference in July 2019

She was elected vice-chairwoman of the party in January 2018. In January 2020, she was re-elected as party vice-chairwoman. Richterová led the Pirates and Mayors electoral alliance in the Prague region in the October 2021 Czech parliamentary election and was re-elected. Subsequently, she became a vice-president of the Chamber of Deputies.

== Personal life ==
Richterová is a member of the Evangelical Church of Czech Brethren, is married and has two children.
