= Michálek =

Michálek (Czech pronunciation: [ˈmɪxaːlɛk]; feminine: Michálková) is a Czech surname. The Slovak form is Michalek (feminine: Michaleková or Michalková) and the Polish equivalent is Michałek (gender-neutral).

== People ==
Michálek
- Pronunciation: [ˈmɪxaːlɛk]

Origin
- Region of origin: Czech Republic

Other names
- Variant forms: Michalek; Michałek; Michalke

=== Michálek ===
- Adam Michálek (born 1975), Czech rower
- Anthony Michalek (born Michálek, 1878–1916), American politician
- Jakub Michálek (born 1989), Czech politician
- Libor Michálek (born 1968), Czech politician
- Milan Michálek (born 1984), Czech ice hockey player, brother of Zbyněk
- Tomáš Michálek (born 1977), Czech footballer
- Vladimír Michálek (born 1956), Czech film director and screenwriter
- Zbyněk Michálek (born 1982), Czech ice hockey player, brother of Milan

=== Michalek ===
Michalek
Origin
- Region of origin: Slovakia; Austria

Michalek is a Slovak surname. It is also used as an anglicisation of Michálek and Michałek. The following people have this surname:

- Chris Michalek (born 1971), American harmonica player
- Connor Michalek (2005–2014), American child cancer patient
- Dieter Michalek (born 1937), German table tennis player
- Georg Michalek (1913–1992), Austrian Luftwaffe ace
- Laura Michalek (born 1963), American runner
- Ludwig Michalek (1859–1942), Austrian artist
- Miroslav Michalek (born 1965), Slovak ice hockey player

=== Michałek ===
Michałek
Origin
- Region of origin: Poland

Michałek is a Polish surname. The following people have this surname:

- Aneta Michałek (born 1991), Polish pair skater
- Iwona Michałek (born 1956), Polish politician

=== Michalke ===
Michalke
Origin
- Region of origin: Germany

Michalke is a German variant. The following people have this surname:

- Andreas Michalke (born 1966), German cartoonist
- Kai Michalke (born 1976), German footballer
- Reiner Michalke (born 1956), German musician
