= Markéta Gregorová =

Member of the European Parliament for the Czech Republic since 2019

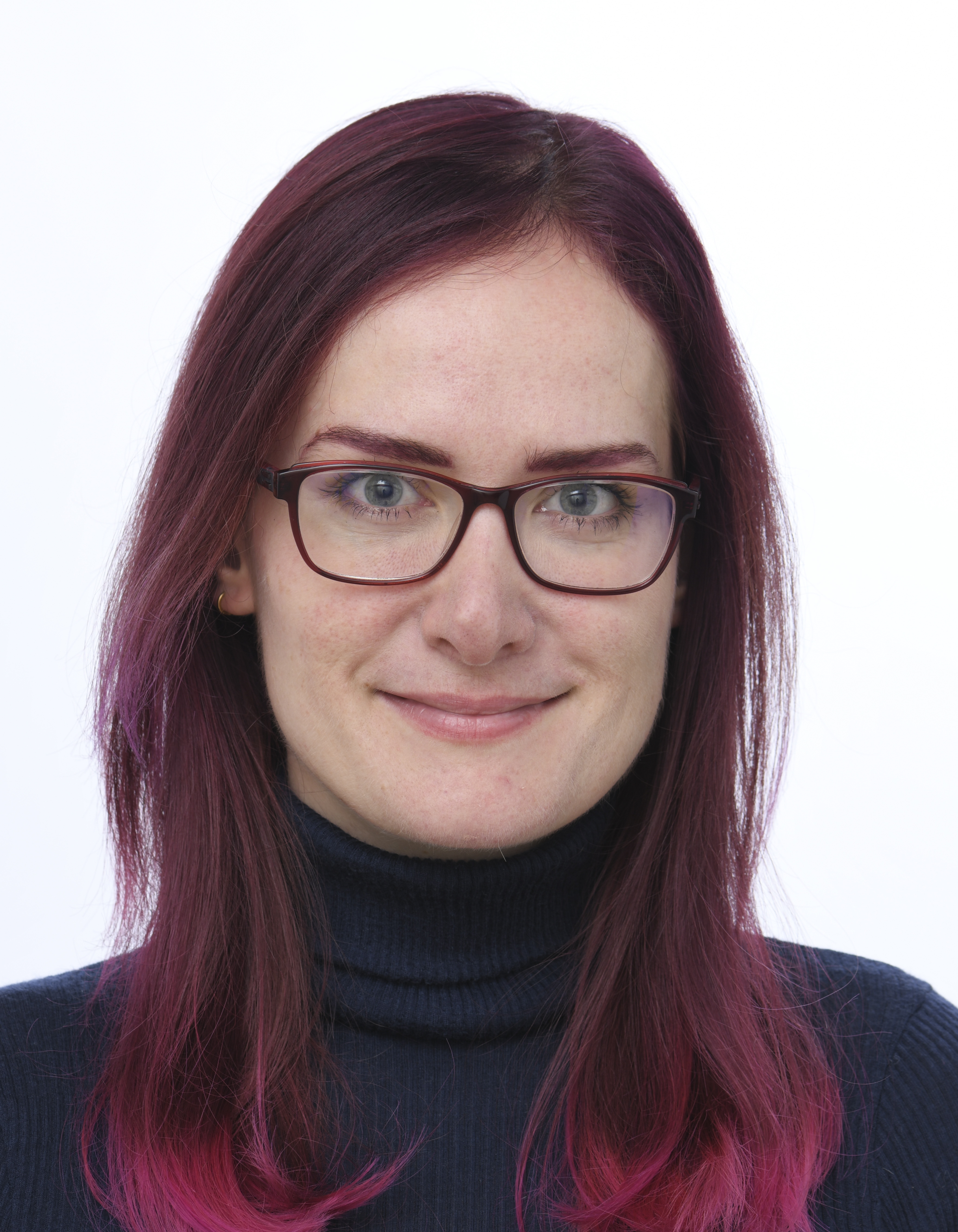
- Official portrait, 2024

Chair of the European Pirate Party
- In office 1 December 2018 – 11 November 2019

Member of the European Parliament for the Czech Republic
- Incumbent
- Assumed office 2 July 2019

Personal details
- Born: 14 January 1993 (age 33) Most, Czech Republic
- Party: Czech Republic: Czech Pirate Party
- Other political affiliations: (European Union) EU Party: European Pirate Party (European Union) EU Parliament group: Greens/EFA
- Education: Masaryk University

Markéta Gregorová (born 14 January 1993) is a Czech politician who has been a Member of the European Parliament since 2019, representing the Czech Pirate Party. Gregorová serves as the Vice-Chair of the Delegation to the Euronest Parliamentary Assembly, and is a member of the Committee on International Trade and the Special Committee on Foreign Interference in all Democratic Processes in the European Union, including Disinformation.

== Early life and career ==
Gregorová was born in Most. She studied International Relations and European Studies at Masaryk University in Brno. She received her master's degree in Public Administration and Security Studies at the CEVRO Institute. Prior to entering politics, Gregorová worked in the private sector, within the fields of marketing and web testing.

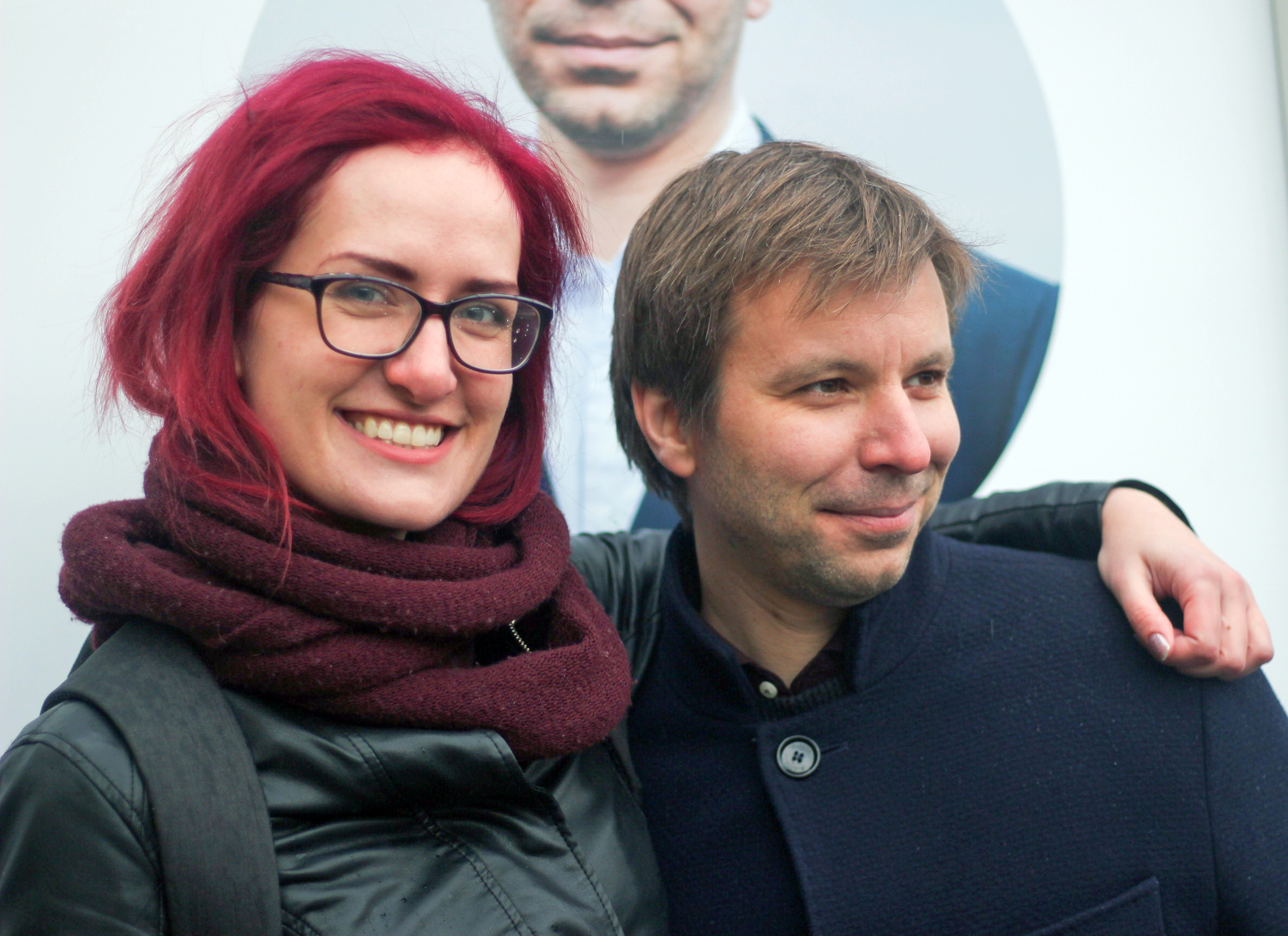
Gregorová with Marcel Kolaja during the campaign for the 2019 European election

Gregorová was third on the Pirate Party candidate list in the 2014 European Parliament election, but was not elected. She was the president of the European Pirate Party from December 2018 to November 2019.

== European Parliament ==
=== Election ===
Gregorová co-wrote the common electoral program for the European Pirate parties, signed in Luxembourg in February 2019. She was elected as a Member of the European Parliament in the 2019 European Parliament election, as the second candidate on the Pirate Party list. She was re-elected in 2024 as the Czech Pirate Party's only remaining MEP.

Gregorová serves as the vice-chair of the delegation to the Euronest Parliamentary Assembly, and is a member of the Committee on International Trade and the Special Committee on Foreign Interference in all Democratic Processes in the European Union, including Disinformation.

Among her priorities are transparency in negotiations of European Union free trade agreements such as the Transatlantic Trade and Investment Partnership (TTIP) and addressing EU involvement in international arms sales to war zones.

=== Committee assignments ===
Gregorová is a member of the following Committees of the European Parliament:

- Delegation to the Euronest Parliamentary Assembly, Vice-Chair
- European Parliament Committee on International Trade
- Special Committee on Foreign Interference in all Democratic Processes in the European Union, including Disinformation
- Delegation to the EU-Armenia Parliamentary Partnership Committee, the EU-Azerbaijan Parliamentary Cooperation Committee and the EU-Georgia Parliamentary Association Committee

== See also ==
- European Neighbourhood Policy
- Marcel Kolaja
- Mikuláš Peksa
