= Marcel Kolaja =

Czech computer specialist, activist and politician (born 1980)

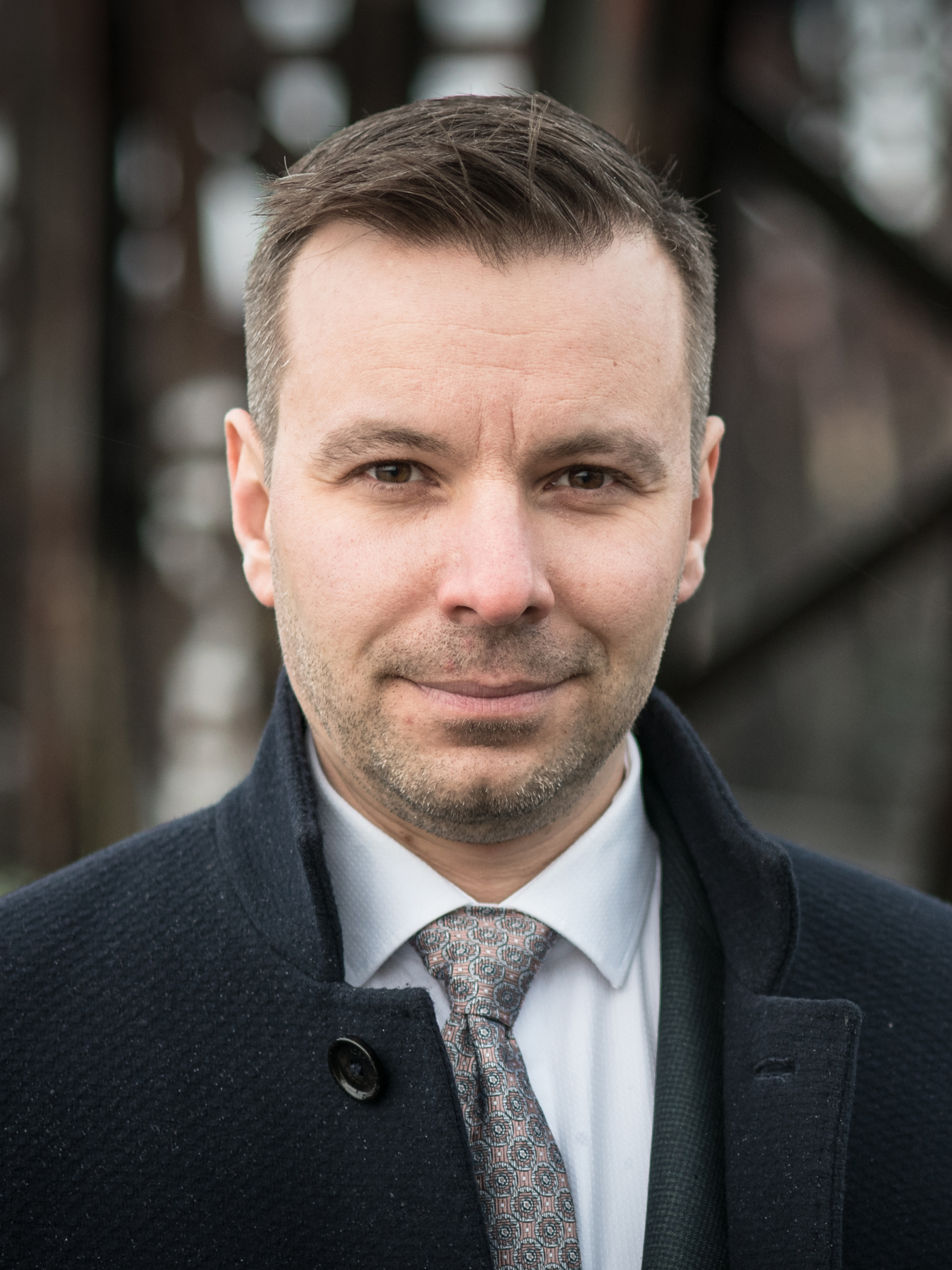
- Kolaja in 2021

Quaestor of the European Parliament
- In office 20 January 2022 – 15 July 2024 Serving with See List

Member of the European Parliament for the Czech Republic
- In office 2 July 2019 – 15 July 2024

Vice-President of the European Parliament
- In office 3 July 2019 – 18 January 2022 Serving with See List
- President: David Sassoli; Roberta Metsola (Acting)

First vice chairman of the Czech Pirate Party
- In office 8 January 2022 – 13 January 2024

Co-chairman of the PPI
- In office 13 March 2011 – 30 November 2011

Personal details
- Born: 29 June 1980 (age 46) Moravská Třebová, Czech Republic (then Czechoslovakia)
- Party: Czech Republic: Czech Pirate Party (2010–2024) (European Union) EU Party: European Pirate Party (European Union) EU Parliament group: Greens/EFA
- Education: Masaryk University

Marcel Kolaja (born 29 June 1980) is a Czech software engineer, Internet freedom and digital rights activist and a former Czech Pirate Party politician who served as a Member of the European Parliament (MEP) from 2019 to 2024 and Quaestor of the European Parliament from 2022 to 2024. He was a member of the Greens–European Free Alliance parliamentary group along with three other European Pirate Party MEPs. In 2025, he joined Access Now as their Policy and Advocacy Director for Europe.

Kolaja was a member of the Czech Pirate Party from 2010 to 2024 and the Vice-President of the Czech Pirate Party from 2022 to 2024. From 2019 to 2022, he served as Vice-President of the European Parliament. He served as Quaestor of the Parliament from 2022 to 2024, being responsible for overseeing the administrative and financial matters of the institution. Kolaja graduated from the Faculty of Informatics, Masaryk University.

Apart from being a Bureau member in the European Parliament, Kolaja was a member of the Committee on the Internal Market and Consumer Protection (IMCO), the Committee on Culture and Education (CULT), and the Special Committee of Inquiry to investigate the use of Pegasus (PEGA), as well as in the delegations for relations with the United States (D-US) and with India (D-IN).

Topics related to the functioning of society in the digital age are his main focus. Marcel Kolaja stands for open technologies, freedom on the Internet, independence of media, transparency, and a united Europe.

== Activism and Czech Pirate Party beginnings (2003–2018) ==
Kolaja worked as an activist against the adoption of software patent legislation in the European Union (EU) from 2003 and joined the Czech Pirate Party in 2010. He became the second candidate of the Czech Pirate Party in the 2014 European Parliament election but was not elected. Kolaja has worked as a technical product manager in Red Hat Czech, a research and development arm of Red Hat, Inc., which itself became a subsidiary of IBM on 9 July 2019.

== European Parliament (2019–2024) ==
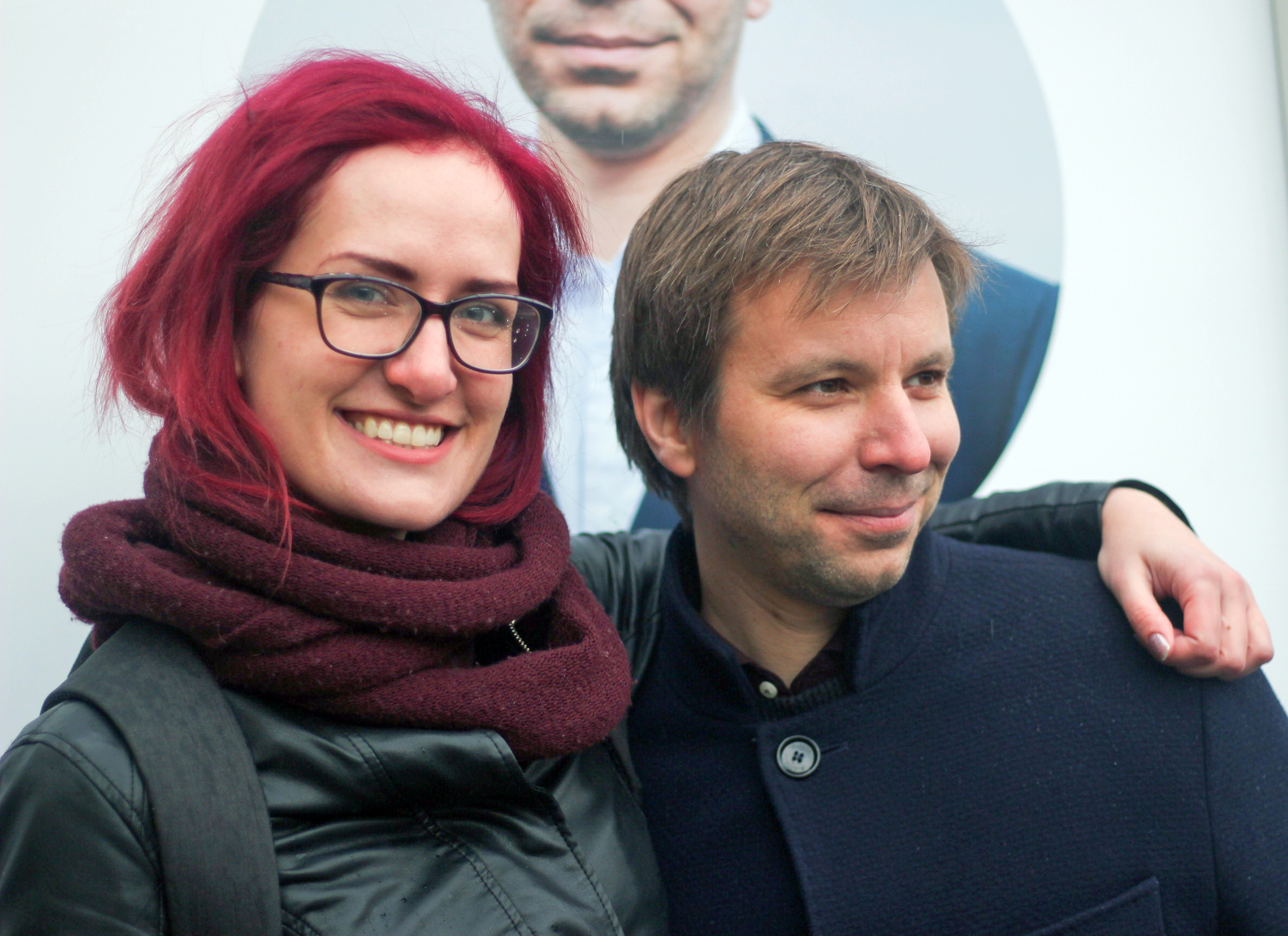
Kolaja and Markéta Gregorová during the campaign for the 2019 European election

=== Election ===
Kolaja was the party's leading candidate for the 2019 European Parliament election in the Czech Republic and was elected MEP along with Markéta Gregorová and Mikuláš Peksa. His political agenda focuses on digital rights and prevention of increasing Internet censorship; environmental protection such as fossil fuel phase-out and minimizing waste pollution; consumer protection, addressing technological competitiveness of the EU on the world market and limiting corporate lobbying in the EU. Among his priorities is also addressing tax avoidance by multinational corporations that offshore profits via tax havens.

=== Tenure ===
On 3 July, Kolaja was elected one of fourteen Vice-Presidents of the European Parliament. He also serves as a vice-chairman of the parliamentary Working Group on ICT Innovation Strategy, as a member of the Bureau of the European Parliament as well as European Parliament Committee on the Internal Market and Consumer Protection. Kolaja aims guarantee fair competition in the online economy by preventing Big Tech gatekeepers from abusing their power. He played a crucial role in initiating FOSSEPS (Free and Open Source Software Solutions for European Public Services), which aims to "manage and protect open source and treat it as a collective European asset across Europe".

=== Committee assignments ===
Kolaja was a member of the following Committees of the European Parliament:

- Bureau of the European Parliament
- European Parliament Committee on the Internal Market and Consumer Protection (IMCO)
- European Parliament Committee on Culture and Education (CULT)
- Committee of Inquiry to investigate the use of Pegasus and equivalent surveillance spyware (PEGA)
- Delegation for relations with the United States

== Independent politician (2024–present) ==
After November 2024 leadership election Kolaja announced his departure from the party, due to different views on politics.

== See also ==
- Czech Pirate Party § European Union and international relations
- Digital Single Market
- Directive on Copyright in the Digital Single Market
- Free software movement
