= Capital outflow =

Capital leaving a particular economy

Capital outflow is an economic term describing capital flowing out of (or leaving) a particular economy. Outflowing capital can be caused by any number of economic or political reasons but can often originate from instability in either sphere.

Regardless of cause, capital outflowing is generally perceived as undesirable and many countries create laws to restrict the movement of capital out of the nations' borders (called capital controls). While this can aid in temporary growth, it often causes more economic problems than it helps.

1. Massive capital outflow is usually a sign of a greater problem, not the problem itself.
2. Countries with outflow restrictions can find it harder to attract capital inflows because firms know if an opportunity goes sour they won't be able to recover much of their investment.
3. Governments that institute capital controls inevitably send a signal to their citizens that something might be wrong with the economy, even if the laws are merely a precautionary measure.

Argentina experienced rampant and sudden capital outflows in the 1990s after its currency underwent dramatic pressure to adjust in light of the fixed exchange rate, leading to a recession. Modern macro-economists often cite the country as a classic example of the difficulties of developing fledgling economies.

== See also ==
- Capital account
- Capital flight
- Criticisms of globalization
- Human capital flight
