= John Michaluk (Canadian football) =

Canadian football player (born 1942)

Profile
- Positions: Center, Linebacker

Personal information
- Born: September 14, 1942 (age 84)
- Listed height: 6 ft 1 in (1.85 m)
- Listed weight: 225 lb (102 kg)

Career information
- College: Kent State

Career history
- 1966–1969: Hamilton Tiger-Cats

Awards and highlights
- Grey Cup champion (1967)

John Michaluk (born September 14, 1942) is an American former professional football player who played for the Hamilton Tiger-Cats. He won the Grey Cup with Hamilton in 1967. He previously played college football at Kent State University.
