= Jakub Michálek =

Czech politician

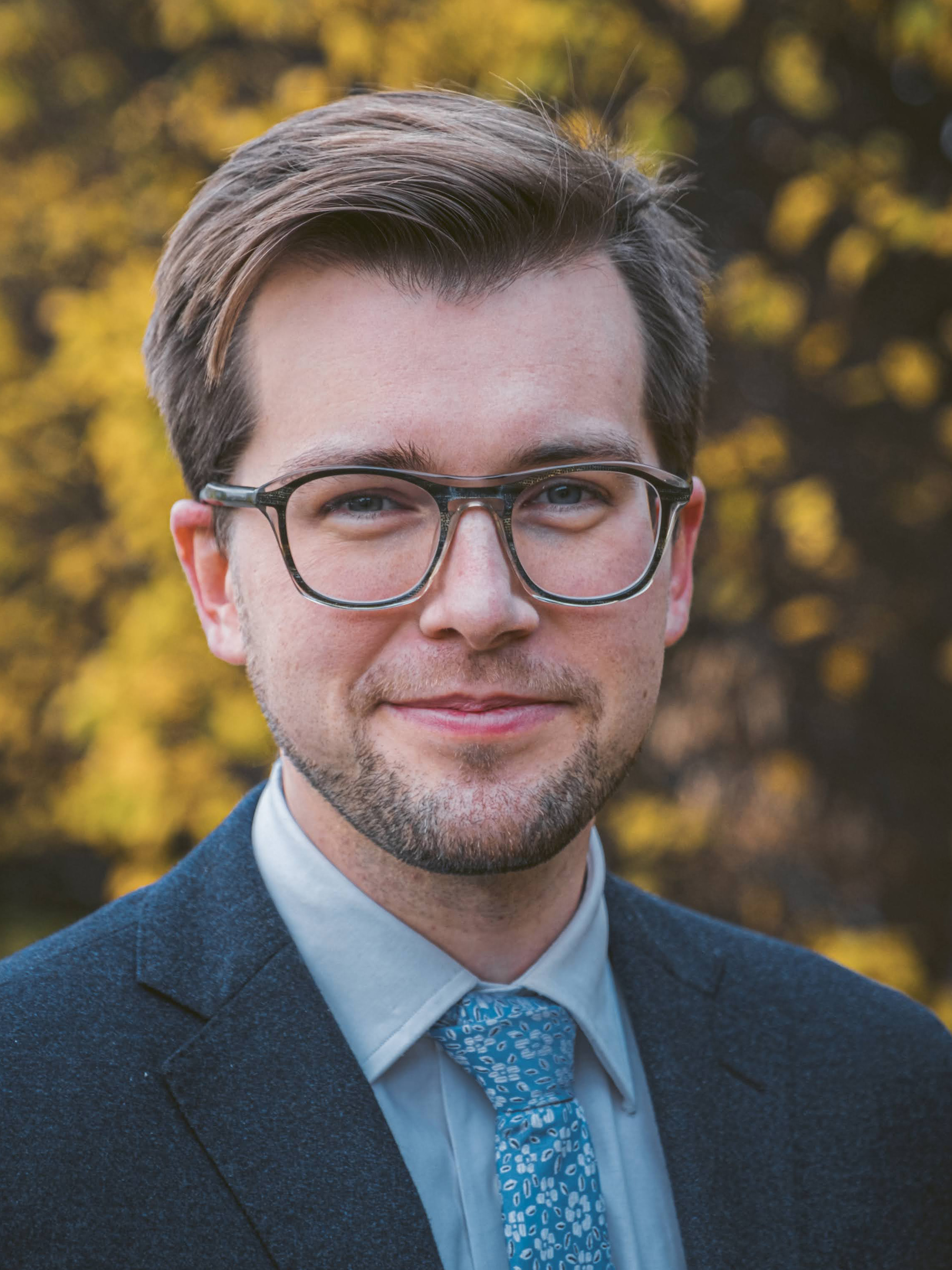
- Michálek in 2020

Leader of the Czech Pirate Party in the Chamber of Deputies
- In office 22 October 2017 – 5 October 2025
- Preceded by: Position established
- Succeeded by: Olga Richterová

Member of the Chamber of Deputies of the Czech Republic
- In office 21 October 2017 – 8 October 2025

3rd Vice President of the Pirates
- In office 10 September 2016 – 11 January 2020
- Preceded by: Václav Fořtík
- Succeeded by: Radek Holomčík

Representative of Prague
- In office 11 October 2014 – 5 December 2017

1st Vice-chairman of Czech Pirate Party
- In office 25 August 2012 – 4 December 2013
- Preceded by: Adam Šoukal
- Succeeded by: Lenka Wagnerová

Personal details
- Born: 6 February 1989 (age 37) Louny, Czechoslovakia
- Party: Czech Pirate Party
- Education: Faculty of Law, Charles University

Jakub Michálek (born 6 February 1989) is a Czech lawyer and politician who served as a member of the Chamber of Deputies of the Czech Republic from 2017 to 2025, representing Czech Pirate Party.

== Political career ==
Michálek led the PirateLeaks project to launch the official website of Czech Pirate Party for the 2012 Czech regional elections. He deals with legal issue in a dispute between him and the Ministry of Finance. Michálek was also the co-author of the request to cancel Article 2 of the so-called Klaus amnesty, which was submitted by a group of 30 senators of the Senate of the Parliament of the Czech Republic.

In the 2014 municipal elections, Michálek was the leader of Pirate Party candidate for Prague City Council, thus became a candidate for the office of mayor of the capital city and was elected as a representative. He also applied for candidacy for the municipal council of the Prague 8 district but was not elected.

Michálek led Pirate Party in Prague during the 2017 Czech parliamentary election, receiving 11,641 preferential votes and was elected as a Member of Parliament. He also became the chairman of the pirate parliamentary club on 22 October. In December 2017, Michálek resigned from the position of Prague representative due to the cumulation of the functions of city representative and deputy. In January 2018, Michálek defended the position of vice-chairman of the Pirates at the party's national forum in Brno.

In October 2019, head of Pirate Party's personnel department, Jana Koláříková, requested Michálek's dismissal from the position of vice-chairman of the party due to his allegedly inappropriate behavior towards party members. Michálek himself refused to resign as he claimed to only have high demands on the performance of people. 294 of 770 party members who opposed for Michálek's dismissal resulted him remaining as vice-chairman, the newly-elected MEP Mikuláš Peksa resigned as vice-chairman in protest. Michálek held the position of vice-chairman of the party until January 2020 when a national forum took place in Ostrava, where he no longer ran for the position of vice-chairman of the party.

== Personal life ==
Michálek is in relationship with Michaela Krausová, former president of the Pirate Party Club in the City Council of Prague.
