= Mikuláš Peksa =

Czech politician and physicist (born 1986)

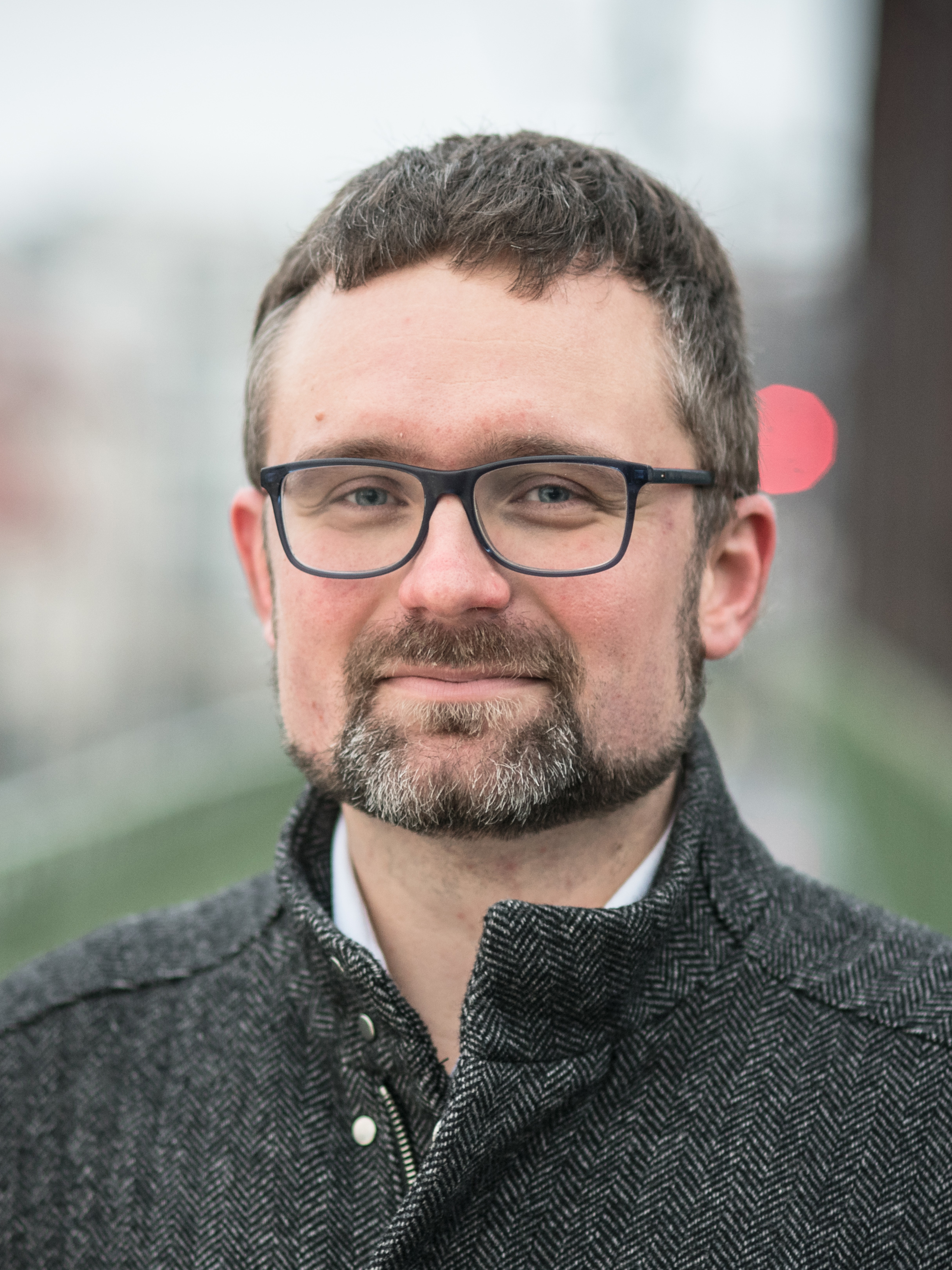
- Peksa in 2021

Member of the European Parliament for the Czech Republic
- In office 2 July 2019 – 15 July 2024

Member of the Chamber of Deputies of the Czech Republic
- In office 21 October 2017 – 6 June 2019
- Succeeded by: František Navrkal

Fourth vice-chairman of the Czech Pirate Party
- In office 24 April 2017 – 5 November 2019

Chairman of the European Pirate Party
- In office 11 November 2019 – 23 June 2024
- Preceded by: Markéta Gregorová
- Succeeded by: Florian Roussel

Personal details
- Born: 18 June 1986 (age 40) Prague, Czech Republic (then Czechoslovakia)
- Party: Czech Republic: Volt Czechia (2025–present) (European Union) EU Party: Volt Europa (2025–present) (European Union) EU Parliament group: Greens/EFA
- Other political affiliations: Czech Republic: Czech Pirate Party (2013–2025) (European Union) EU Party: European Pirate Party (2013–2025)
- Education: Charles University

Mikuláš Peksa (born 18 June 1986) is a Czech biophysicist and politician for Volt Europa. He was elected as a Member of the European Parliament for the Czech Pirate Party in the 2019 election, and sat with the Greens–European Free Alliance parliamentary group.

== Early career ==
Peksa studied biophysics at the Faculty of Mathematics and Physics of the Charles University in Prague, focusing on nuclear magnetic resonance, and worked as a researcher and a software engineer.

== Political career ==
=== Pirate Party ===
Peksa joined the Czech Pirate Party in 2013. In the 2017 Czech legislative election, he was elected a Member of the Chamber of Deputies.

In the 2019 European election, he was elected as a Member of the European Parliament along with Marcel Kolaja and Markéta Gregorová, and stood down as a deputy of the Czech Parliament on 6 June 2019. He joined the Greens–European Free Alliance parliamentary group.

In the European Parliament, Peksa was a member of two European Parliament committees: the European Parliament Committee on Industry, Research and Energy, and the Delegation to the EU-Ukraine Parliamentary Association Committee

=== Volt ===
On 17 March 2025, Peksa joined Volt Czechia, the national chapter of Volt Europa, a progressive and federalist European political alliance.
