= 2022 Prague municipal election =

- 23–24 September 2022

All 65 seats in the Assembly 33 seats needed for a majority
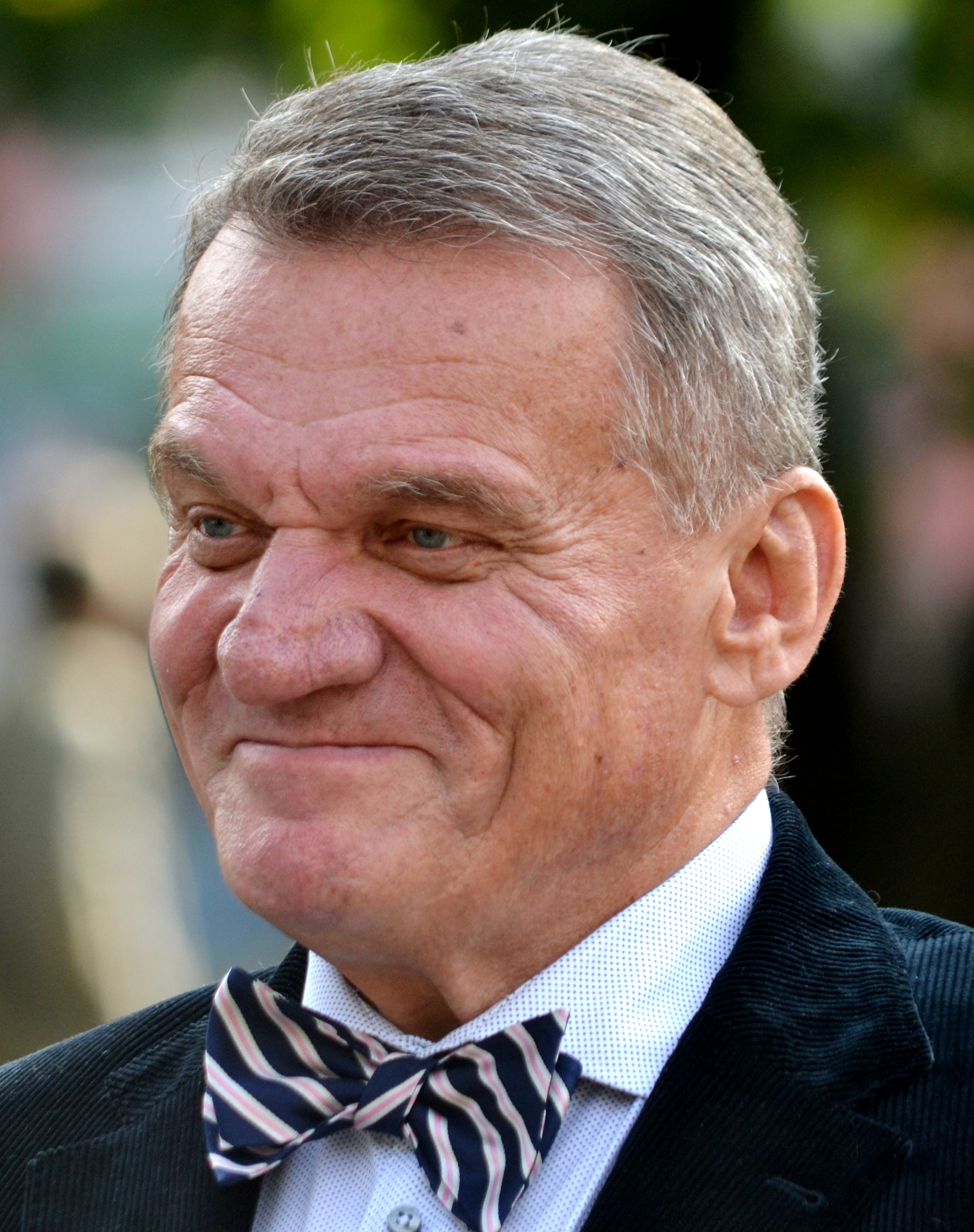

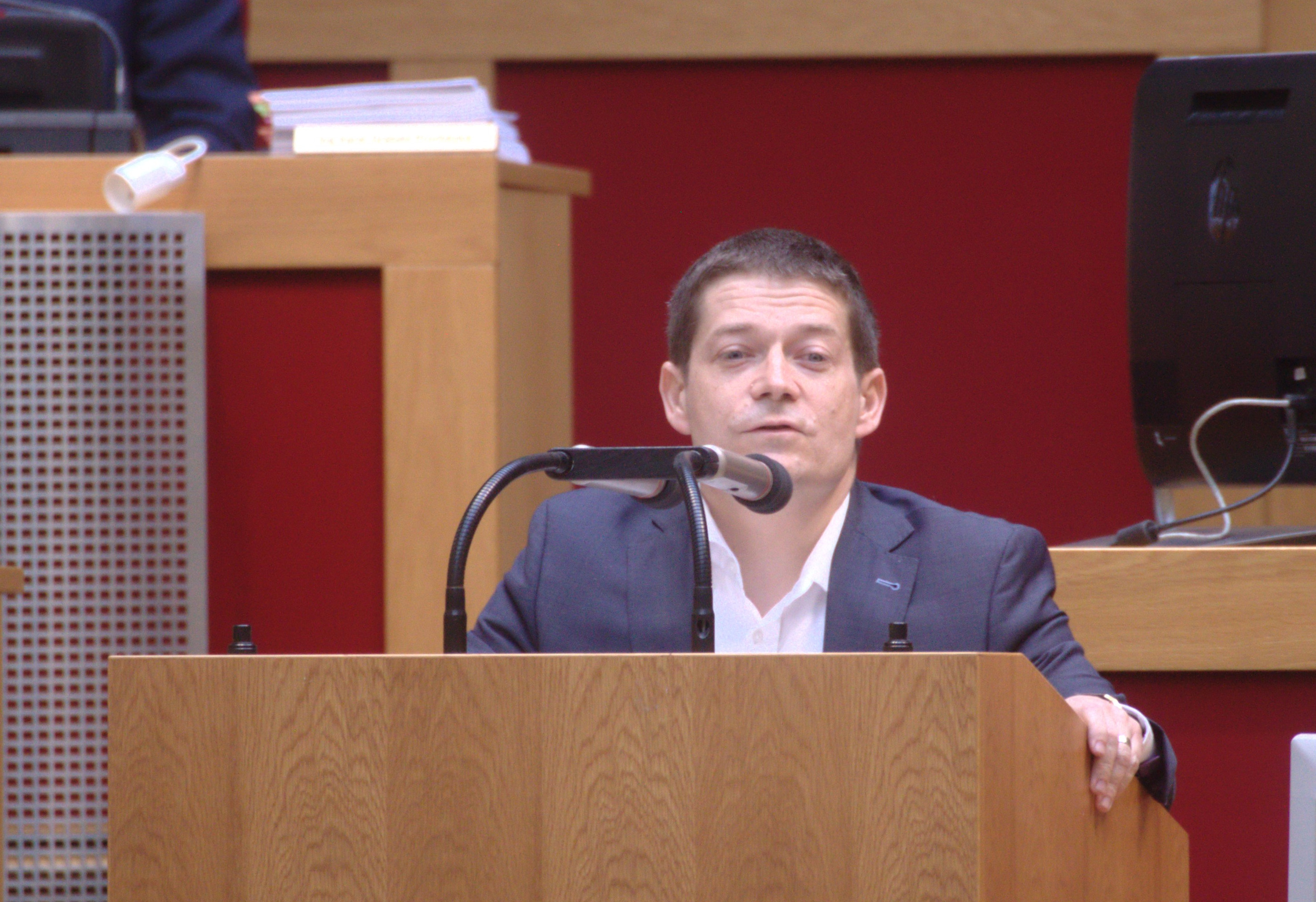

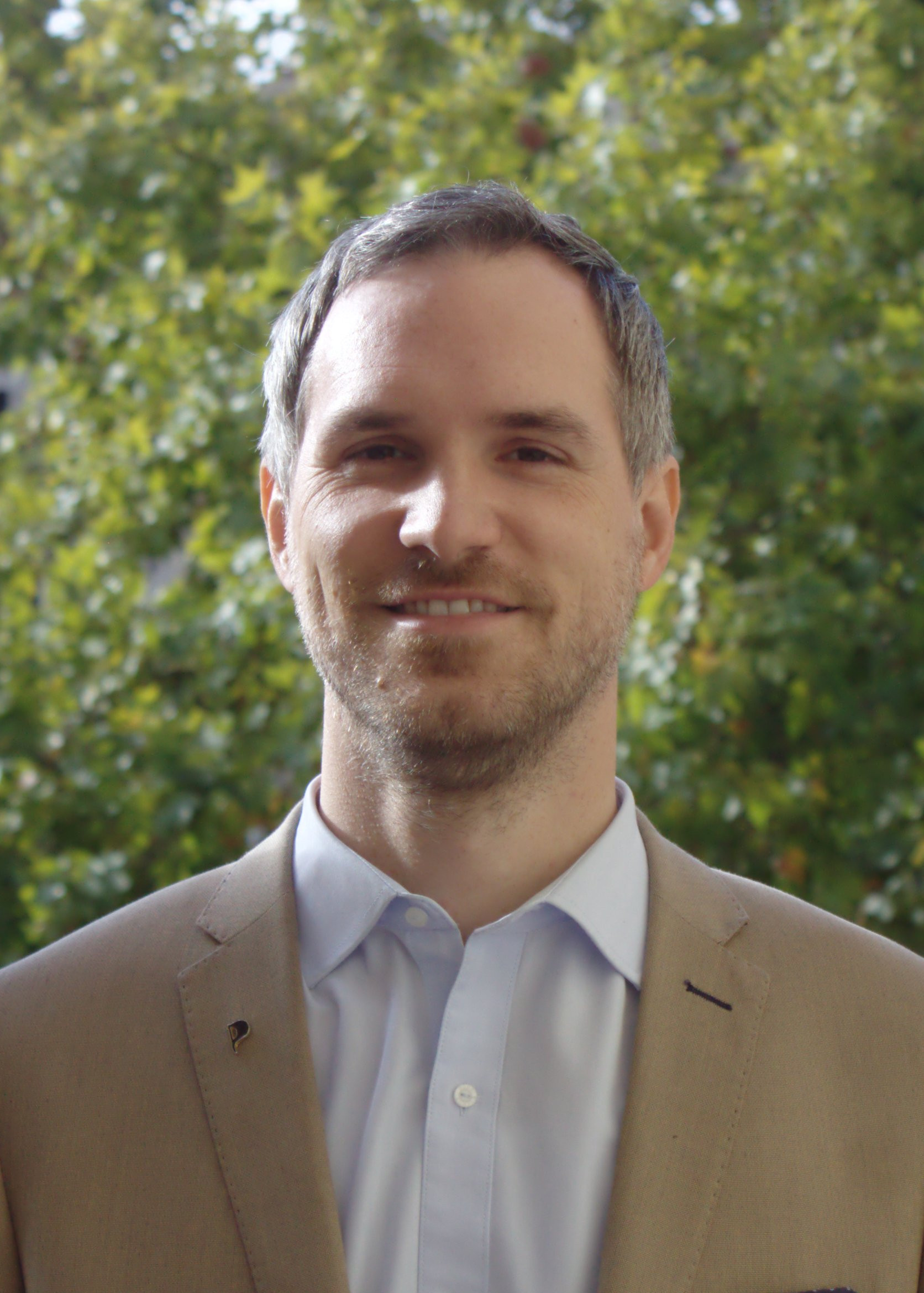

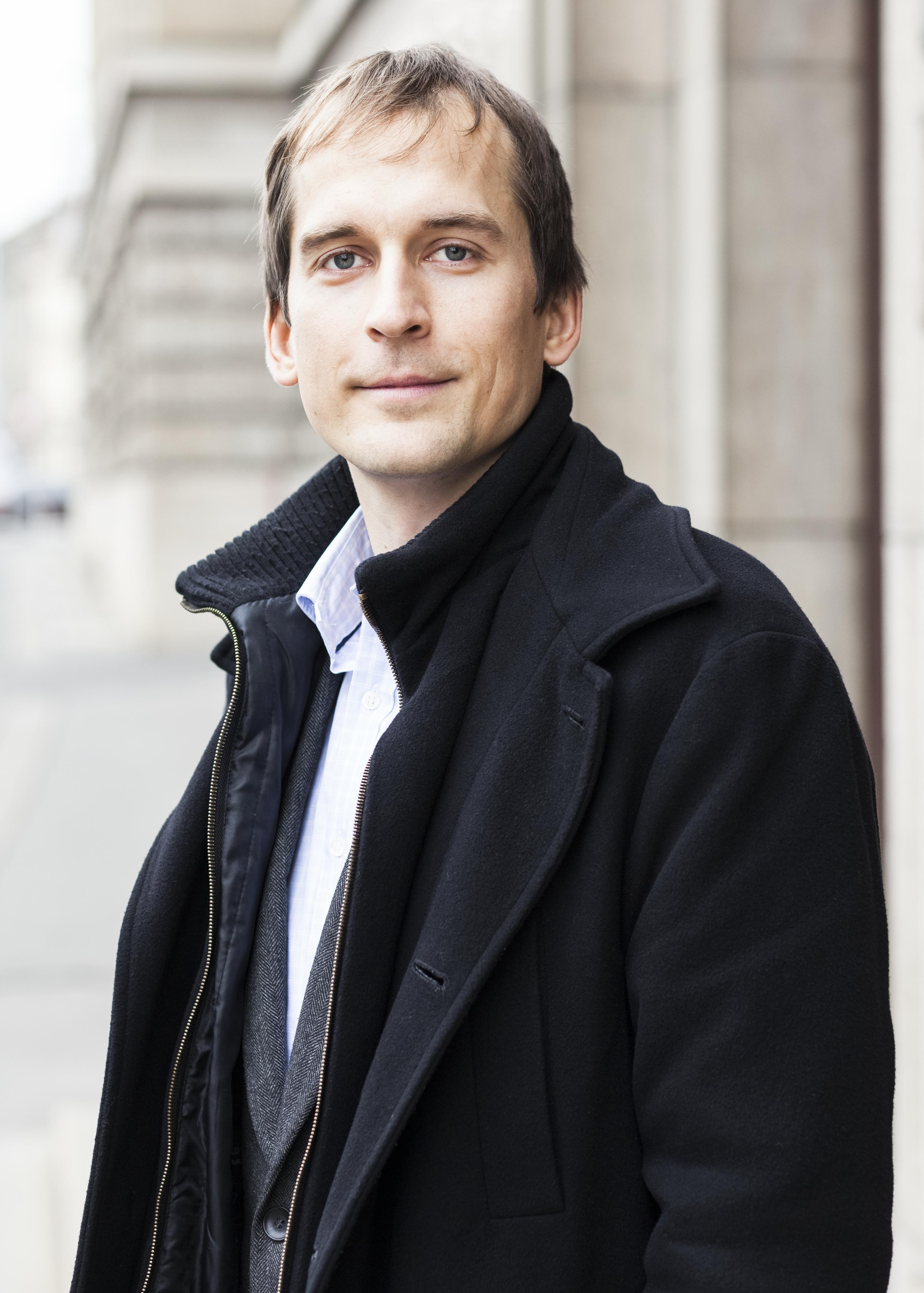

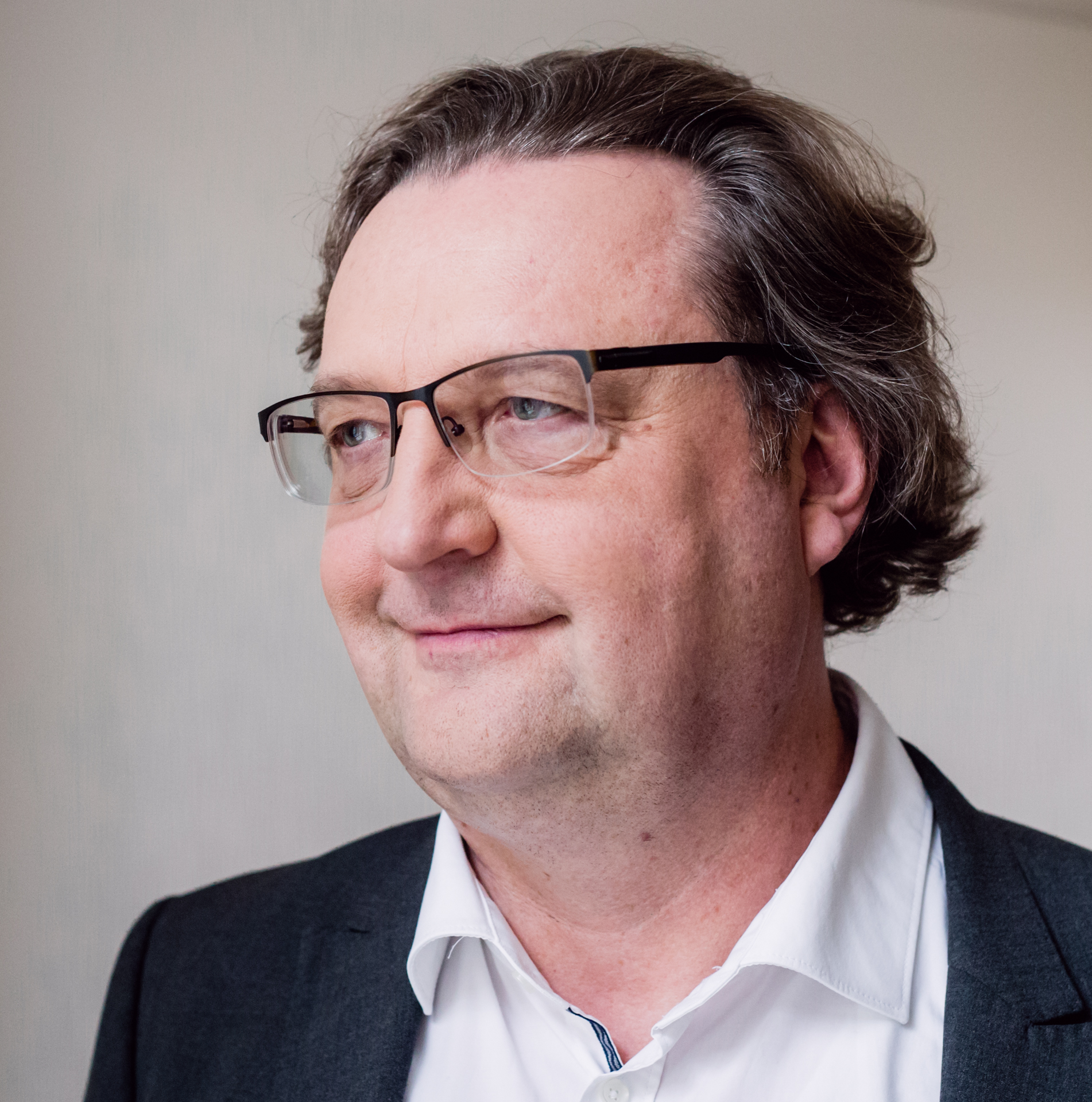

	First party	Second party	Third party
Leader	Bohuslav Svoboda	Patrik Nacher	Zdeněk Hřib
Party	ODS	ANO	Pirates
Alliance	Spolu
Last election	23 seats	12 seats, 15.4%	13 seats, 17.1
Seats won	19	14	13
Seat change	▼4	▲2	0
Popular vote	5,828,523	4,559,782	4,180,324
Percentage	24.7%	19.3%	17.7%
	Fourth party	Fifth party	Sixth party
Leader	Jan Čižinský	Petr Hlaváček	Milan Urban
Party	Prague Together	STAN	Freedom and Direct Democracy
Alliance			SPD-Tricolour-PES
Last election	13 seats, 16.6%	4 seats
Seats won	11	5	3
Seat change	▼2	▲1	▲3
Popular vote	3,472,648	1,831,696	1,218,622
Percentage	14.7%	7.8%	5.2%
Mayor before election
Zdeněk Hřib
Pirates
Elected mayor
Bohuslav Svoboda
ODS

The 2022 Prague municipal election was held in September 2022 as part of the nationwide municipal elections to elect members of the Prague City Assembly. It was a victory for Spolu which received the highest number of votes and seats ahead of ANO 2011 in second place. The Czech Pirate Party led by incumbent Mayor Zdeněk Hřib finished third. New coalition was formed 5 months after election and it consists of Spolu, Pirates and STAN. Bohuslav Svoboda became the new mayor.

== Background ==
The Civic Democratic Party received the highest number of votes in the 2018 Prague municipal election but remained in opposition as a coalition was formed by the Czech Pirate Party, Prague Together, TOP 09 and Mayors and Independents. Zdeněk Hřib became the new mayor.

Preparations for the next municipal election started following the 2021 Czech parliamentary election which resulted in a victory for the Spolu alliance, consisting of the Civic Democratic Party, KDU-ČSL and TOP 09. Leaders of those three parties then discussed continuing their cooperation in the upcoming municipal election. TOP 09 was also approached by Mayors and Independents, who had run on a joint list with TOP 09 in the 2018 municipal election. On 25 January 2022 the Civic Democratic Party, KDU-ČSL and TOP 09 agreed to continue cooperation under the SPOLU platform for the 2022 municipal election. The Pirate Party decided to nominate incumbent mayor Zdeněk Hřib for reelection. On 21 March 2022 Bohuslav Svoboda was reported to be the electoral leader of SPOLU as the Prague organisation of ODS confirmed his nomination. Other parties in SPOLU had previously expressed their support for Svoboda. Svoboda's nomination as a mayoral candidate was confirmed on 4 April 2022.

Seznam Zprávy reported on 28 April 2022 that Radka Vladyková might become the ANO 2011 nominee for Mayor. Leader of Prague organisation Ondřej Prokop and MP Patrik Nacher both confirmed the party's interest in her nomination, although both Prokop and Nacher were also mentioned as potential candidates. On 7 July 2022 Nacher was confirmed to be ANO's mayoral nominee.

SPOLU launched its campaign on 1 May 2022.

== Parties and coalitions ==
The following parties announced their candidacy and have been registered in opinion polls:

Party/Coalition Full name		Ideology	Leader(s)	2018 result		pre-election seats
Party/Coalition Full name		Ideology	Leader(s)	Votes (%)	Seats	pre-election seats
Spolu	ODS; Civic Democratic Party	Conservatism	Bohuslav Svoboda	17.9	13 / 65	13 / 65
Spolu	TOP 09	Liberal conservatism	Bohuslav Svoboda	16.3 (Note: Votes for the United Forces for Prague alliance consisting of TOP 09, Mayors and Independents and KDU-ČSL.)	8 / 65	7 / 65
Spolu	KDU-ČSL; Christian and Democratic Union – Czechoslovak People's Party	Christian democracy	Bohuslav Svoboda	16.3	1 / 65	1 / 65
Pirates; Czech Pirate Party		Pirate politics	Zdeněk Hřib	17.1	13 / 65	13 / 65
Prague Together			Jan Čižinský	16.6	13 / 65	13 / 65
ANO 2011		Right-wing populism	Patrik Nacher	15.4	12 / 65	12 / 65
STAN; Mayors and Independents		Liberalism	Petr Hlaváček	(Note: Part of the United Forces for Prague alliance along with TOP 09 and KDU-ČSL.)	4 / 65	4 / 65
Svobodní		Right-libertarianism	Tomáš Štampach	DNP (Note: Did not participate in the elections)	1 / 65	1 / 65
Solidarity	ČSSD; Czech Social Democratic Party	Social democracy	Anna Šabatová	2.9	0 / 65	0 / 65
Solidarity	Greens; Green Party	Green politics	Anna Šabatová	1.8	0 / 65	0 / 65
Solidarity	Idealisté; Idealists	Progressivism	Anna Šabatová	DNP	0 / 65	0 / 65
Solidarity	Budoucnost; The Future	Democratic socialism	Anna Šabatová	DNP	0 / 65	0 / 65
Together for Prague	Freedom and Direct Democracy	Right-wing populism	Milan Urban	3.54	0 / 65	0 / 65
Together for Prague	Tricolour Citizens' Movement	National conservatism	Milan Urban	DNP	0 / 65	0 / 65
Together for Prague	Hnutí PES; DOG Party	Right-wing populism	Milan Urban	DNP	0 / 65	0 / 65

== Pre-election composition of assembly ==
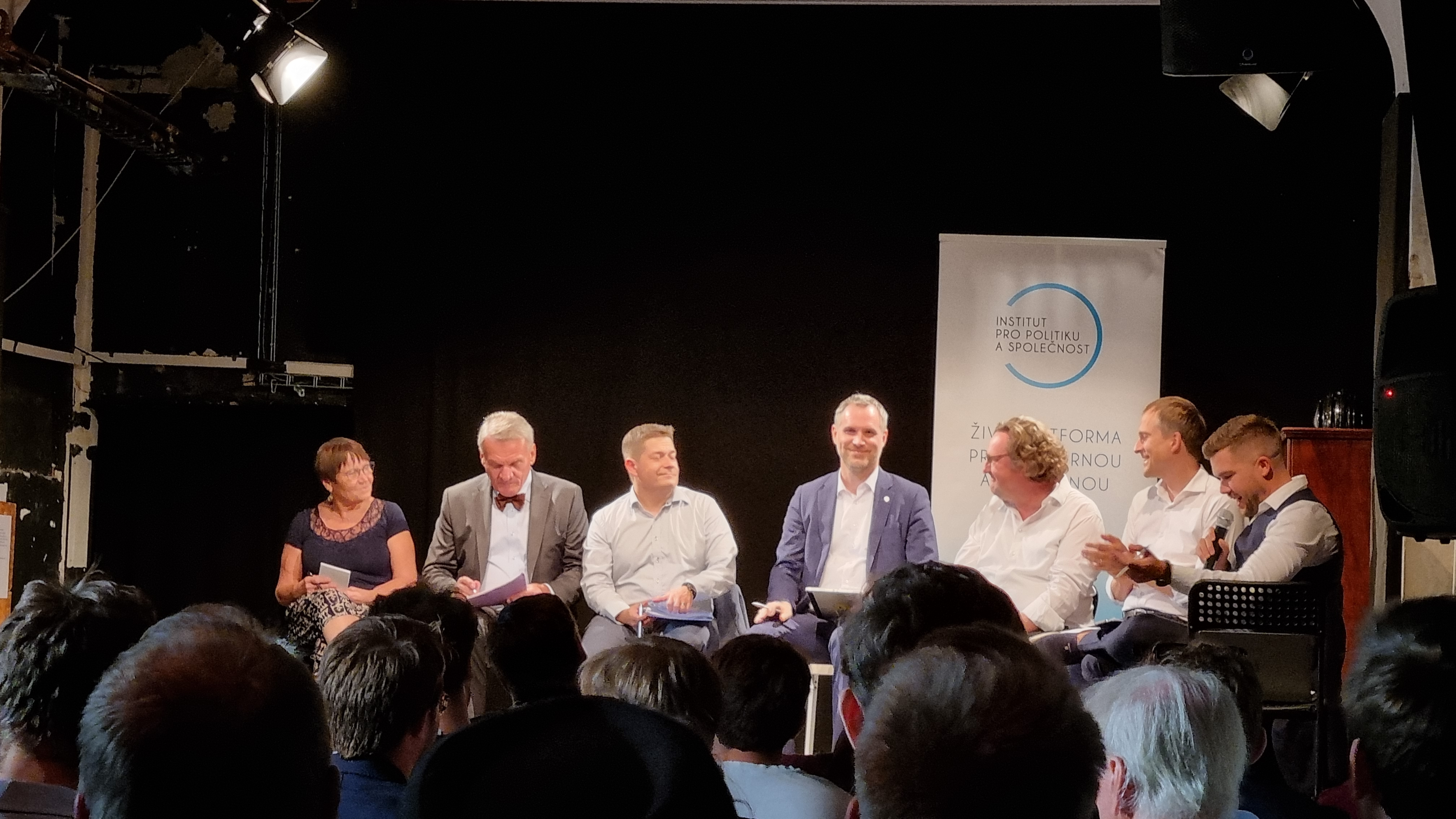
Pre-election debate of Anna Šabatová (Solidarity), Bohuslav Svoboda (Spolu), Patrik Nacher (ANO), Zdeněk Hřib (Pirates), Petr Hlaváček (STAN) and Jan Čižinský (Prague Together)

Party	Seats
Civic Democratic Party	13
Czech Pirate Party	13
Prague Together	13
ANO 2011	12
TOP 09	7
Mayors and Independents	4
KDU-ČSL	1
Svobodní	1
Independent	1

== Opinion polls ==
Polling firm	Fieldwork date	Sample size	Turnout	Spolu			Piráti	PS	STAN	ANO	SPD	KSČM	ČSSD	Zelení	Tricolour	Oth.	Lead
Polling firm	Fieldwork date	Sample size	Turnout	ODS	TOP 09	KDU– ČSL	Piráti	PS	STAN	ANO	SPD	KSČM	ČSSD	Zelení	Tricolour	Oth.	Lead
Sanep	11 – 20 August 2022			26.9			11.7	14.9	3.4	15.8	4.3	—N/a	3.8		—N/a	19.2	12.0
Phoenix Research	20 July – 12 August 2022	1,016		26.5			9.1	15.6	3.7	17.1	3.1	1.5	3.1		—N/a		9.4
Phoenix Research	20 June – 13 July 2022			33.7			7.2	12.7	4.3	19.3	4.4	2.5	4.1		—N/a	11.8	14.4
Phoenix Research	20 May – 13 June 2022	998		29.3			7.6	11.4	9.4	18.9	4.3	2.7	3.6		—N/a	10.8	10.4
Sanep	1–8 March 2022	5,116	47.8	22.1	7.7	3.1	11.6	15.2	6.4	14.8	3.7	—N/a	—N/a	—N/a	—N/a	15.4	6.9
Ipsos	December 2021			35.2			9.6	7.2	15.6	16.8	4.6	1.2	3.4	2.2	2.8	1.4	19.6
Ipsos	December 2021			20	11.7	2.0	10.2	8	18.1	15.5	4.6	1.2	3.2	1.3	3	1.2	1.9

== Results ==
Party	Votes	%	Seats
Spolu	5,828,523	24.72	19
ANO 2011	4,559,782	19.34	14
Czech Pirate Party	4,180,424	17.73	13
Prague Together	3,472,648	14.73	11
Mayors and Independents	1,831,696	7.77	5
Freedom and Direct Democracy, Tricolour Citizens' Movement, PES and independents	1,218,622	5.17	3
Motorists for Themselves	540,209	2.29	0
Solidarity	475,968	2.02	0
Communist Party of Bohemia and Moravia	347,643	1.47	0
Svobodní	281,478	1.19	0
Better Prague for Praguers	207,719	0.88	0
Přísaha with Patriots	195,426	0.83	0
Prague without Chaos	157,626	0.67	0
Prague our Home	100,579	0.43	0
Society against development building in Prokop Valley	71,216	0.30	0
Freeholder Party of the Czech Republic, Koruna Česká, Conservative Party, Club of Committed Non-Party Members	52,497	0.22	0
S.O.S. for Animal Rights — Democratic Party of Greens	42,216	0.18	0
Volt	4,816	0.02	0
For Safe Streets in Prague	4,709	0.02	0
Right Bloc	2,071	0.01	0
DOST	1,187	0.01	0
Urza.cz	1,002	0.00	0
Total	23,578,057	100.00	65
