= 2018 Prague municipal election =

- 5 and 6 October 2018

All 65 seats in the Assembly 33 seats needed for a majority
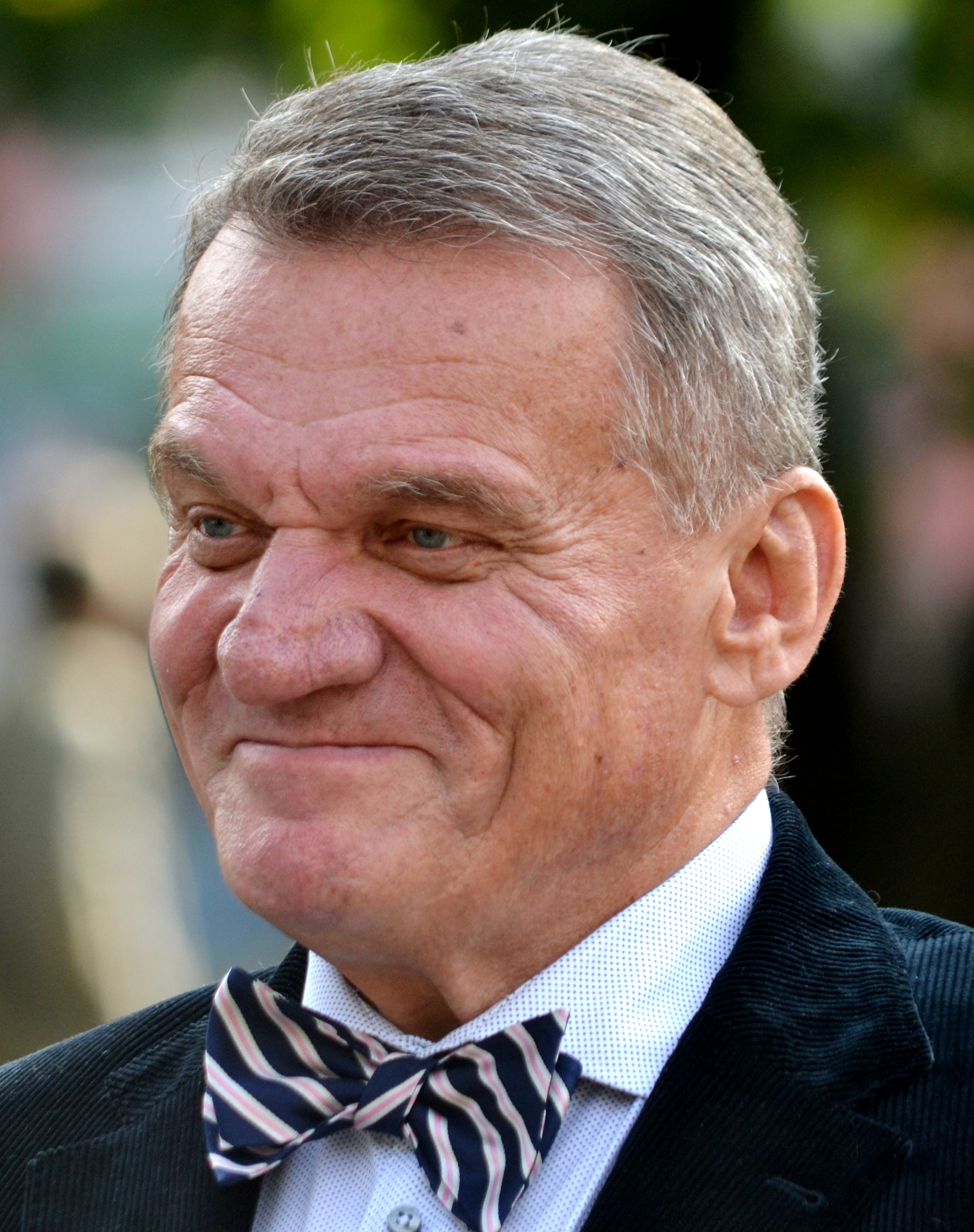

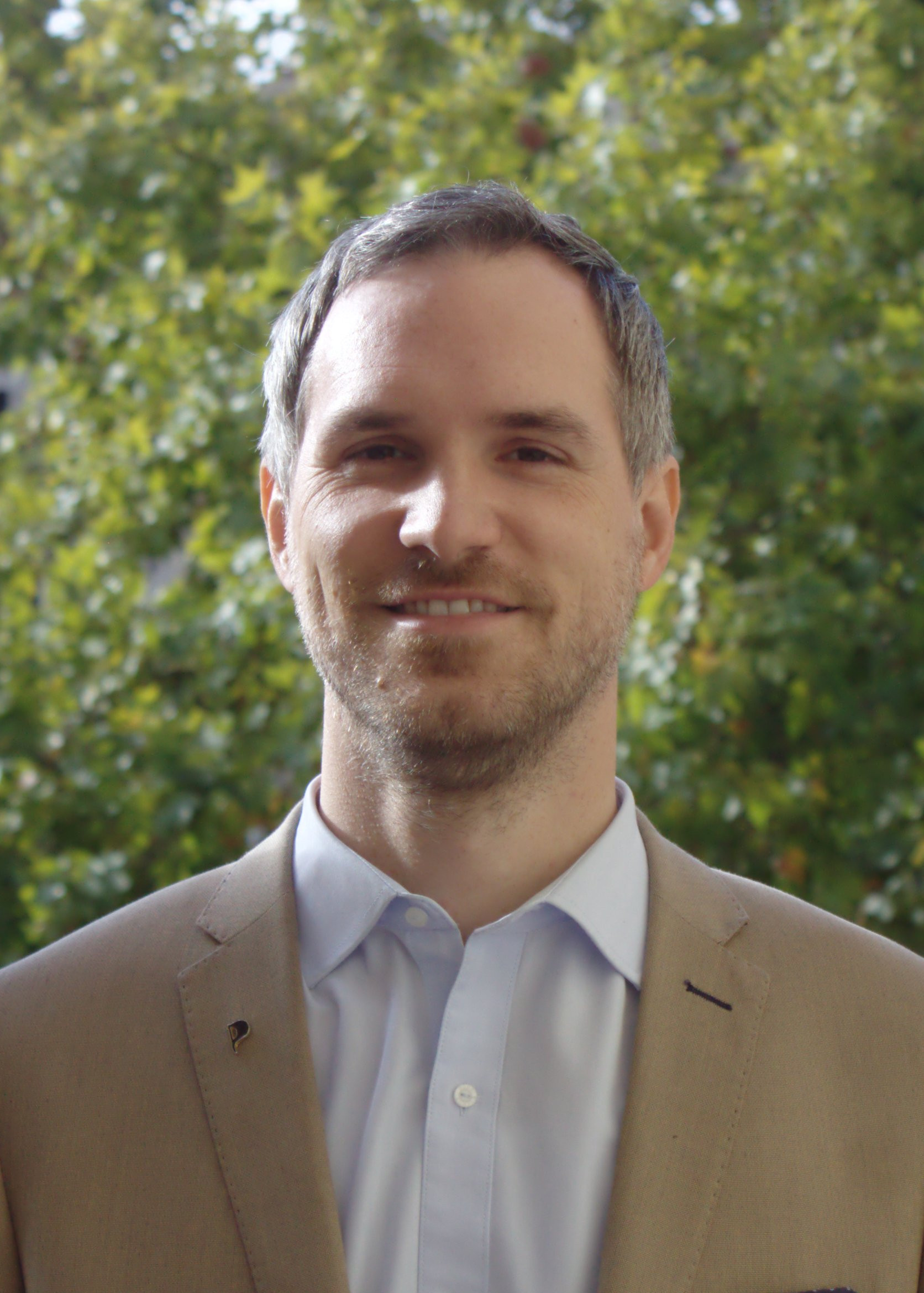

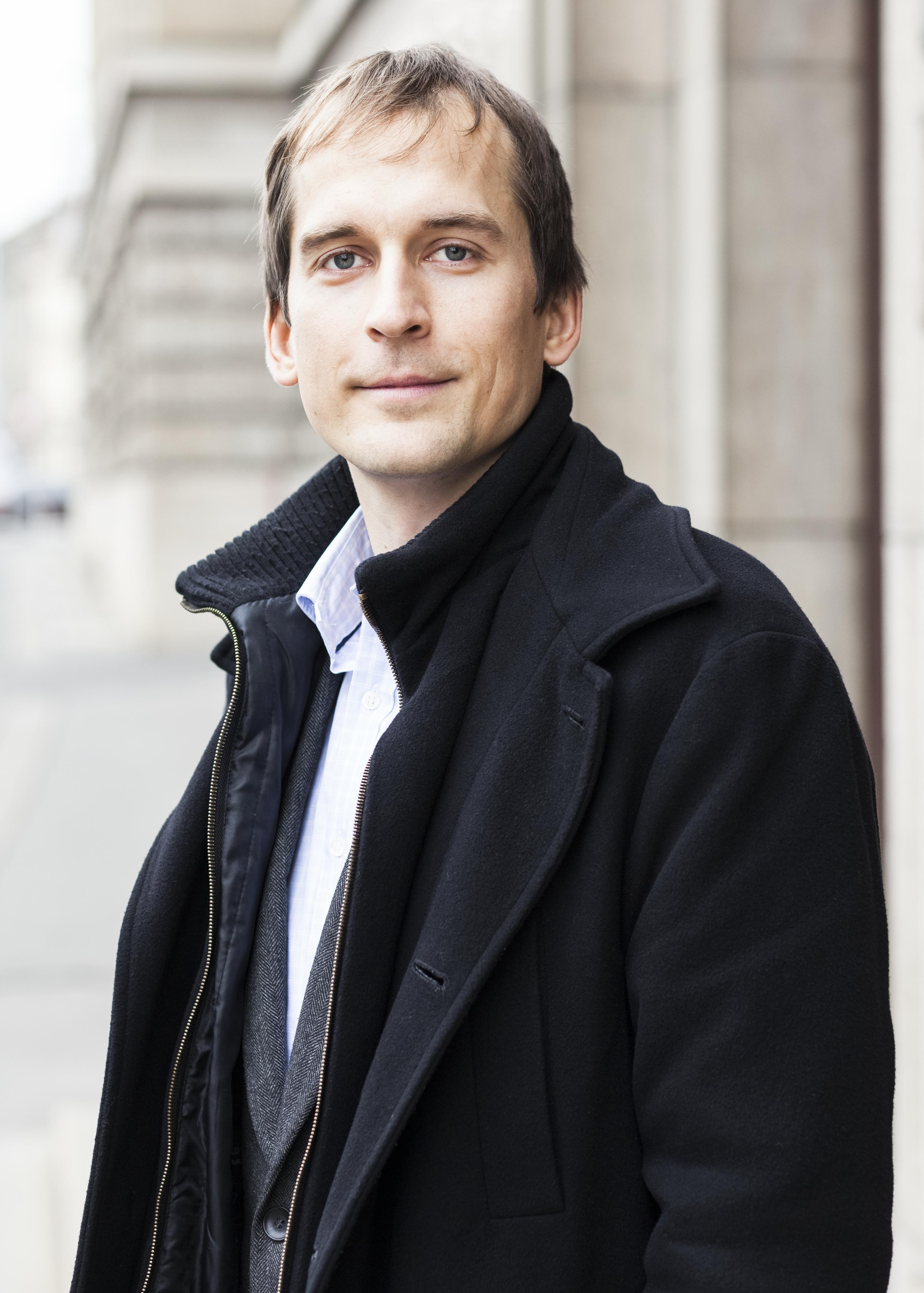

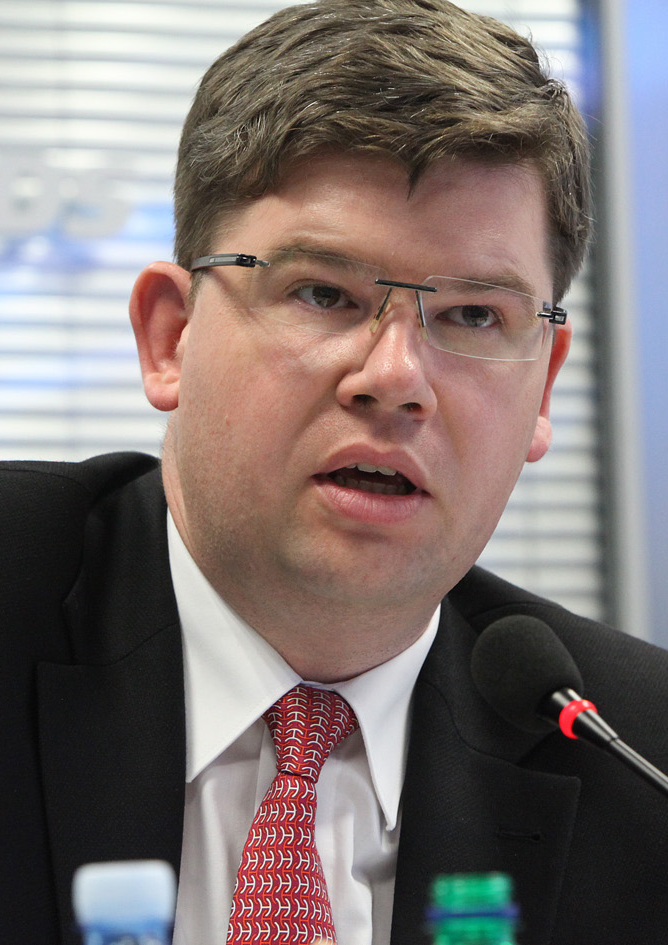

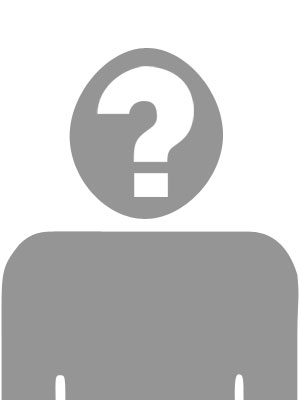
	First party	Second party	Third party
Leader	Bohuslav Svoboda	Zdeněk Hřib	Jan Čižinský
Party	ODS	Pirates	Prague Together
Last election	8 seats, 11.0%	4 seats, 5.3%	Did not contest
Seats won	14	13	13
Seat change	▲6	▲9	▲13
Popular vote	4,527,920	4,326,041	4,197,578
Percentage	17.9%	17.1%	16.6%
Swing	▲6.9%	▲11.8%	New party
	Fourth party	Fifth party
Leader	Jiří Pospíšil	Petr Stuchlík
Party	TOP 09	ANO
Alliance	UFP
Last election	16 seats, 20.1%	17 seats, 22.1%
Seats won	13	12
Seat change	▼3	▼5
Popular vote	4,127,063	3,893,968
Percentage	16.3%	15.4%
Swing	▼3.8%	▼6.7%
Mayor before election
Adriana Krnáčová
ANO 2011
Elected mayor
Zdeněk Hřib
Pirates

The 2018 Prague municipal elections were held in Prague in on 5 and 6 October 2018 as part of nationwide municipal elections. All 65 seats of the Prague Assembly were up to elect. Full results were presented a day later, on 7 October 2018.

The result was a narrow victory of the conservative Civic Democratic Party (ODS), which received 17.9 per cent of votes and 14 seats. The ODS won for the fifth time in Prague. Followed by the liberal Czech Pirate Party (Pirates), receiving 17.1 per cent (almost 12 per cent more than in 2014 election), and 13 seats. Praha sobě ("Prague Together", 16.6 per cent) and the United Forces for Prague (16.3 per cent) won 13 seats as well. Centrist populist ANO, the strongest party of the Czech Republic at that time, as well as the strongest party in Prague, lost 5 seats and 6.7 per cent of votes, receiving 12 seats and 15.4 per cent of votes. The Freedom and Direct Democracy received only 3.5 per cent, failing to reach the 5% threshold. The Communist Party received 3.3 per cent, and the Czech Social Democratic Party received 2.9 per cent, both failed to reach the threshold for the first time. Pirate Party's Zdeněk Hřib was elected as mayor with the support of Prague Together and UFP.

== Background ==
ANO 2011 won the 2014 municipal elections, with Adriana Krnáčová becoming Mayor of Prague. The coalition in Prague consists of Czech Social Democratic Party and Three-Coalition (Green Party, Christian and Democratic Union – Czechoslovak People's Party, Mayors and Independents).

Preparations for the 2018 elections started in December 2017. Krnáčová was expected to run for second term as a candidate of ANO 2011. TOP 09 announced Jiří Pospíšil as its candidate for Mayor. The party suggested electorali alliance with Christian and Democratic Union – Czechoslovak People's Party and Mayors and Independents. The Civic Democratic Party was speculated to stand Alexandra Udženija or Bohuslav Svoboda as its candidate for Mayor. Czech Pirate Party also plans to have its candidate for Mayor. Christian and Democratic Union – Czechoslovak People's Party MP Jan Čižinský announced his candidacy for Mayor on 14 December 2017. He is candidate of Civic Initiative Prague Together. During February 2018, Krnáčová's position within ANO 2011 weakened due to some problems with her management of the city. Czech Pirate Party launched its primaries for Mayor candidate on 5 February 2018. Zdeněk Hřib won the primary. On 6 February 2018, Parlamentní Listy reported that the Czech Social Democratic Party started negotiations with Jiří Drahoš about his possible candidacy for Mayor.

TOP 09 and Mayors and Independents agreed to participate on joint list. Hana Marvanová became electoral leader of the alliance. Adriana Krnáčová announced on 11 April 2018 that she will end in politics after the election and won't run for another term as Mayor.

The Civic Democratic Party announced on 7 June 2018 that Bohuslav Svoboda will be its candidate for Mayor. Svoboda stated that he wants to return Prague to people of Prague. Party of Free Citizens and Realists will participate in election on the Civic Democratic Party list.

In July 2018, it was reported that Patrik Nacher will be replaced by Petr Stuchlík as ANO 2011 electoral leader. It was confirmed on 13 July 2018 when Stuclík was announced to be party's candidate for Mayor.

== Campaign ==
=== ANO 2011 ===
ANO launched campaign on 3 September 2018. It uses slogan "Make Prague richer." Petr Stuchlík is party's candidate for Mayor.

Stuchlík held a press conference on 19 September 2018. He called Transportation issues a priority for ANO 2011. He stated that Prague should focus on finishing D0 motorway.

=== Civic Democratic Party ===
The Civic Democratic Party launched its campaign on 9 March 2018. Party had installed its posters in Public transportation and in streets. Campaign was called "We will start up the Prague together."

The party announced Bohuslav Svoboda as its candidate for Mayor during July 2018. Svoboda stated that he believes that Prague citizens remember what he built in the city when he used to be the Mayor.

The main phase of party's campaign was launched on 5 September 2018. Svoboda called transportation the main problem in Prague. The party criticised previous council that consisted of ANO, ČSSD and Three-Coalition.

ODS was also very critical of Pirate Party during its campaign against anarchy.

=== Czech Pirate Party ===
Pirates launched main phase of its campaign on 4 September 2018. Zdeněk Hřib stated that party aims to win the election. Party used slogans "On the Edge of Change" and "We keep course."

=== Czech Social Democratic Party ===
ČSSD launched campaign on 20 August 2018. Party promised public transportation for free and building of transportation infrastructure.

== Pre-election composition of assembly ==
Party	Seats
ANO 2011	17
TOP 09	12
Three-Coalition	8
Civic Democratic Party	8
Czech Social Democratic Party	8
Communist Party of Bohemia and Moravia	4
Czech Pirate Party	4
Independent	3

== Opinion polling ==
=== Preferred party ===
Polling firm	Fieldwork Date	ANO	TOP 09	Z	KDU-ČSL	ODS	ČSSD	KSČM	Piráti	SPD	UFP	SP	Others	Lead
Election	5 - 6 Oct 2018	15.4	—N/a	1.8	—N/a	17.9	2.9	3.3	17.1	3.5	16.3	16.6	25.0	0.8
Kantar TNS	30 Sep 2018	15.0	13.5	1.0	4.5	20.5	5.0	2.0	22.5	7.5	—N/a	—N/a	—N/a	2.0
Sanep	26 Sep 2018	18.1	16.5	—N/a	3.7	17.9	4.1	4.0	20.3	6.9	—N/a	—N/a	8.5	2.2
STEM/Mark	25 Sep 2018	15.0	—N/a	1.0	—N/a	17.0	2.0	1.0	15.0	4.0	8.0	12.0	25.0	2.0
Sanep	12 Sep 2018	12.6	—N/a	—N/a	—N/a	11.2	4.2	3.1	12.5	3.9	10.8	—N/a	—N/a	0.1
Kantar TNS	2 Sep 2018	14.0	10.5	—N/a	5.5	13.0	2.5	6.5	21.5	13.0	—N/a	—N/a	13.5	7.5
Phoenix Research	13 Aug 2018	22.7	—N/a	—N/a	—N/a	16.5	4.6	4.6	15.9	4.6	—N/a	—N/a	3.3	6.2
Sanep	19 Jul 2018	18.2	14.9	—N/a	3.7	19.1	4.3	3.8	19.3	6.9	—N/a	—N/a	—N/a	1.1
Phoenix Research	22 Jun 2018	21.5	13.0	—N/a	3.9	13.8	4.2	5.0	15.6	—N/a	—N/a	—N/a	11.5	5.9
Phoenix Research	22 Mar - 13 Apr 2018	21.4	12.5	—N/a	3.0	12.6	5.0	6.0	17.0	—N/a	—N/a	—N/a	18.5	4.4
2014 election	10-11 Oct 2014	22.1	20.1	11.2	w.Zelení	11.0	10.4	5.9	5.3	—N/a	—N/a	—N/a	14	2

=== Preferred mayor ===
Polling firm	Fieldwork Date	Čižinský	Ferjenčík	Hudeček	Humplík	Nacher	Krnáčová	Stropnický	Svoboda	Wolf	Others
Sanep	9 - 15 Dec 2017	9.1	10.6	1.5	2.9	5.2	4.1	1.7	15.8	4.4	44.7

== Result ==
Party	Leader	Votes	%		Seats	
Party	Leader	Votes	#	±	#	±
Civic Democratic Party (ODS)	Bohuslav Svoboda	4,527,920	17.87	+6.90	14	+6
Czech Pirate Party (Piráti)	Zdeněk Hřib	4,326,041	17.07	+11.76	13	+7
Prague Together	Jan Čižinský	4,197,578	16.57	+16.57	13	+13
United Forces for Prague (TOP 09, STAN, KDU-ČSL, LES and SNK ED)	Jiří Pospíšil	4,127,063	16.29	–3.78	13	–3
ANO 2011 (ANO)	Petr Stuchlík	3,893,968	15.37	–6.71	12	–5
Freedom and Direct Democracy (SPD)	Hynek Beran	895,859	3.54	+3.54	0	0
Communist Party of Bohemia and Moravia (KSČM)	Marta Semelová	827,036	3.26	–2.65	0	–4
Czech Social Democratic Party (ČSSD)	Jakub Landovský	727,826	2.87	–7.56	0	–8
Mayors for Prague		486,991	1.92	-0.47	0	0
Green Party (Zelení)	Ondřej Mirovský	467,071	1.84	–9.38	0	–8
Others		862,294	3.40	–10.61	0	0
