= 2014 Prague municipal election =

- 10–11 October 2014

All 65 seats in the Assembly 33 seats needed for a majority
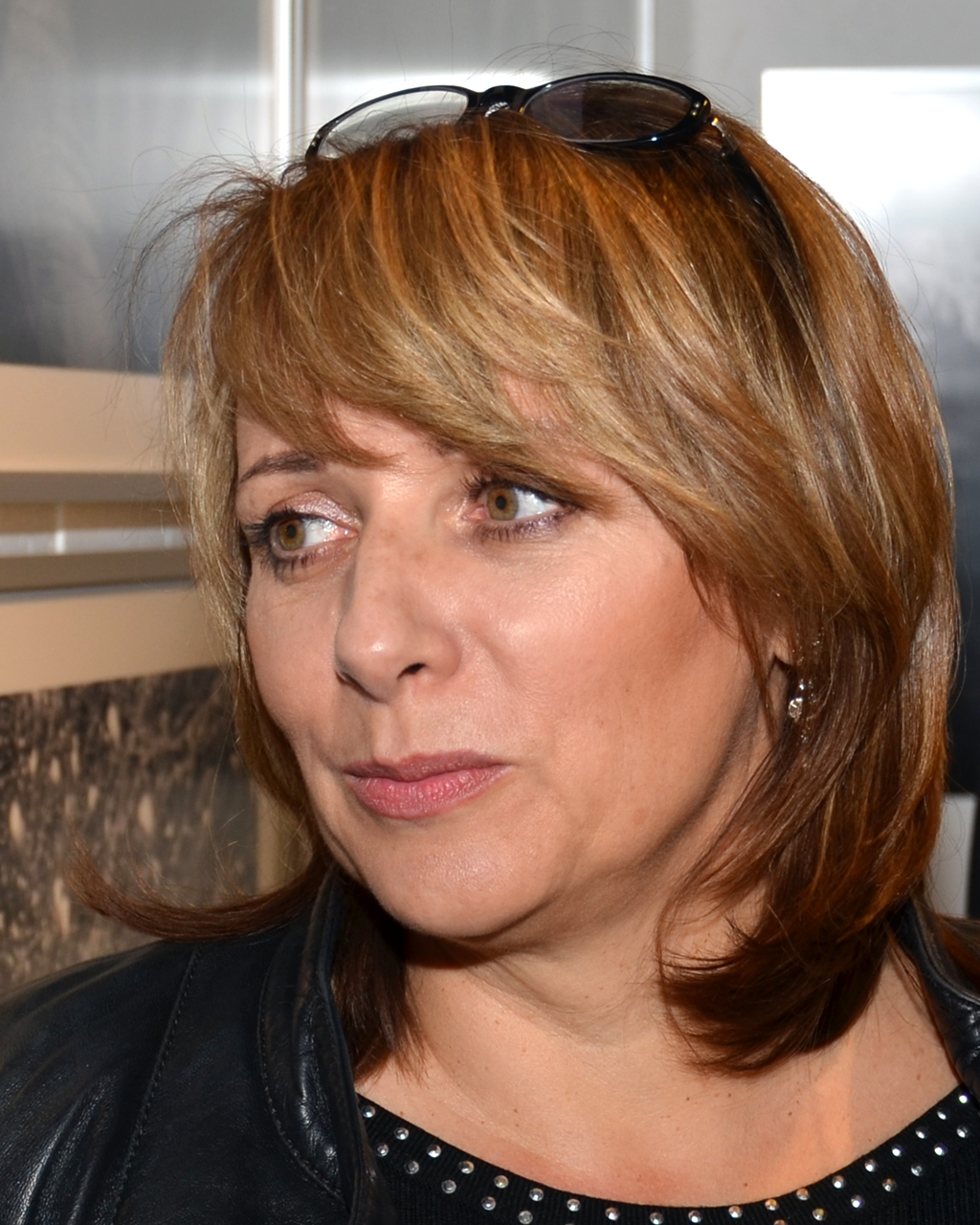

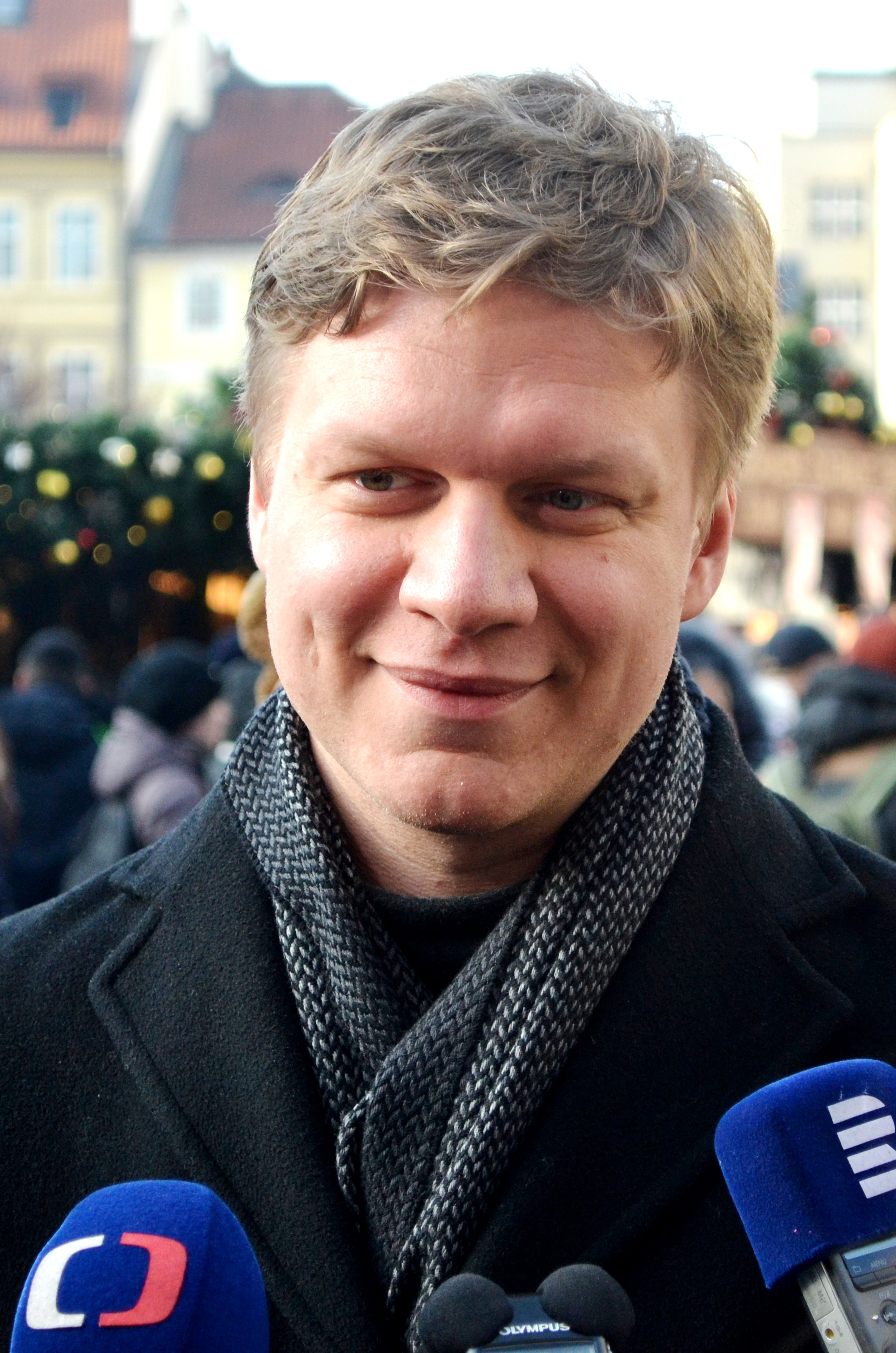

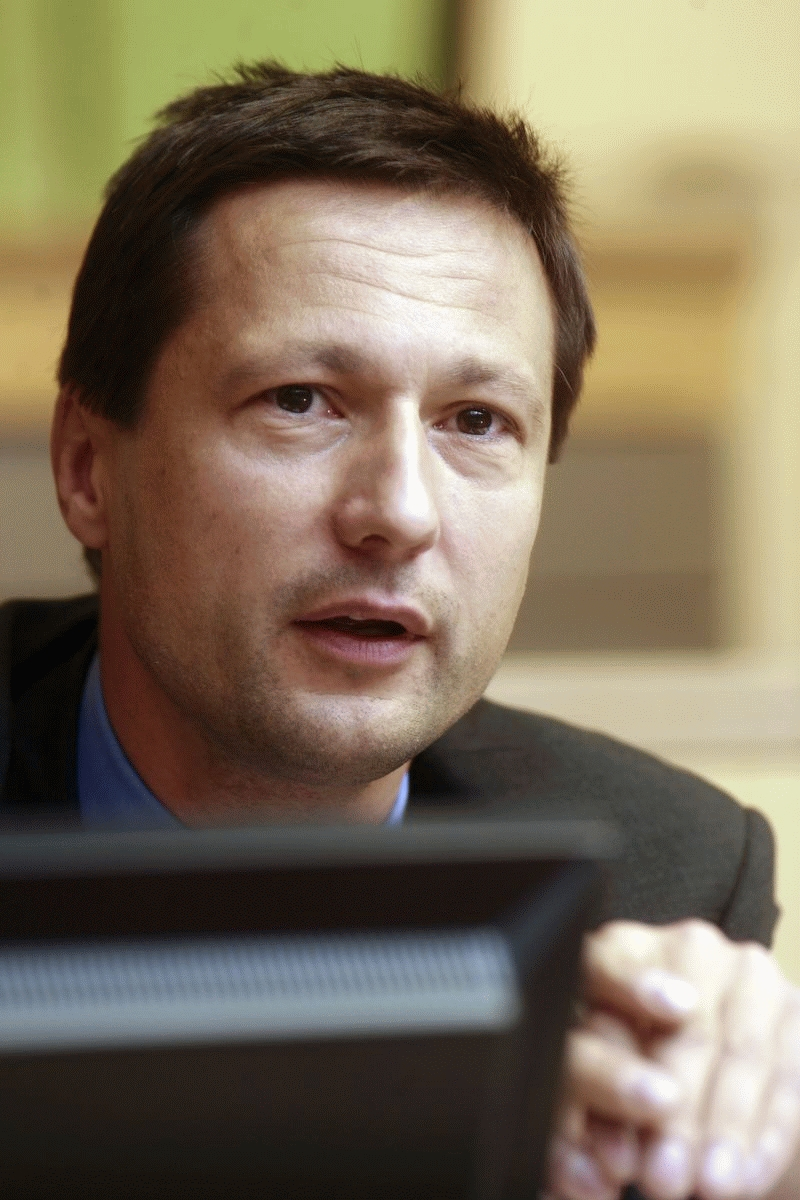

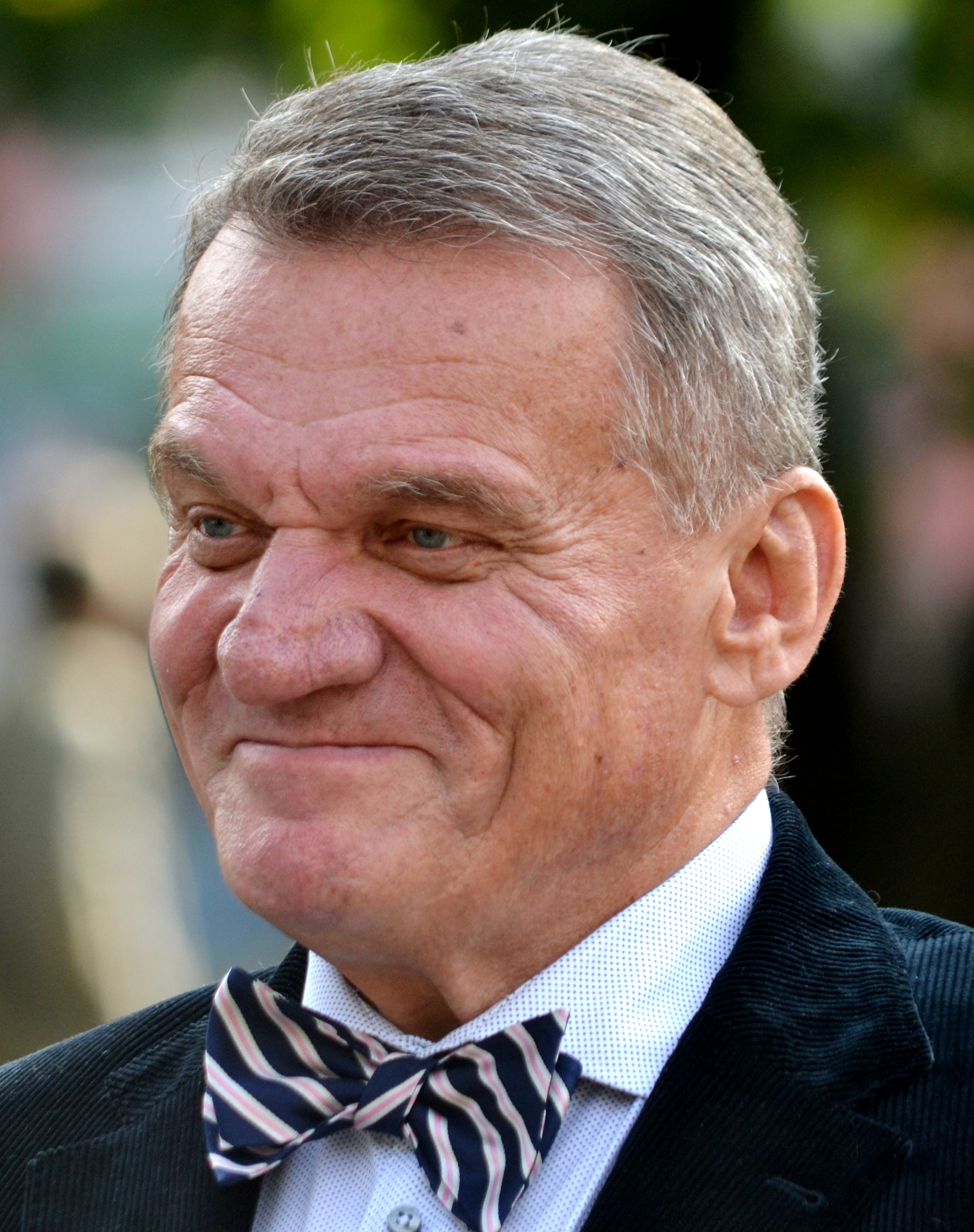

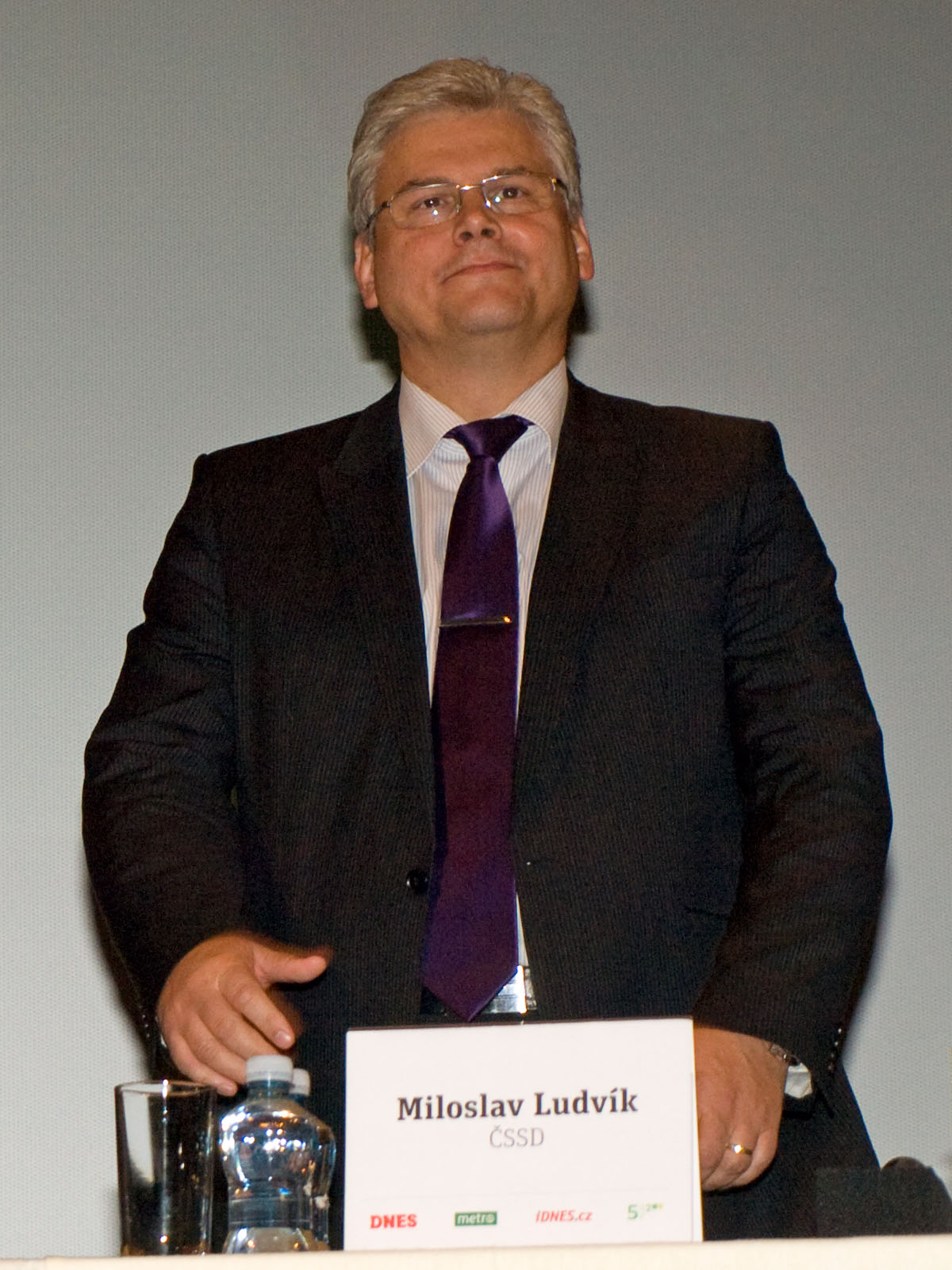

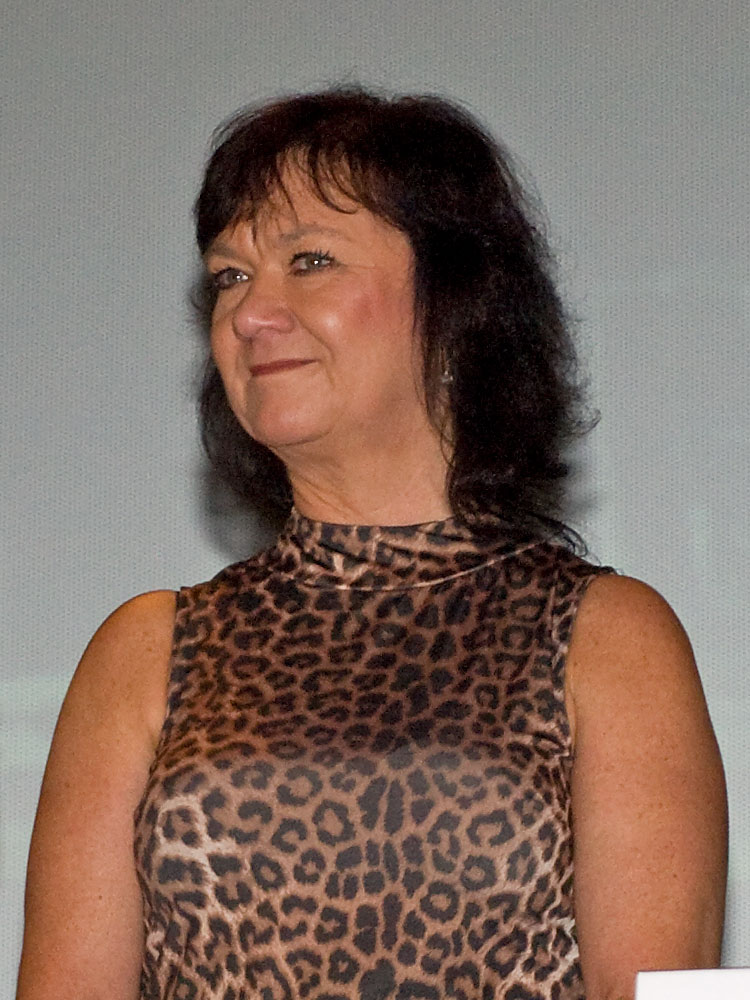

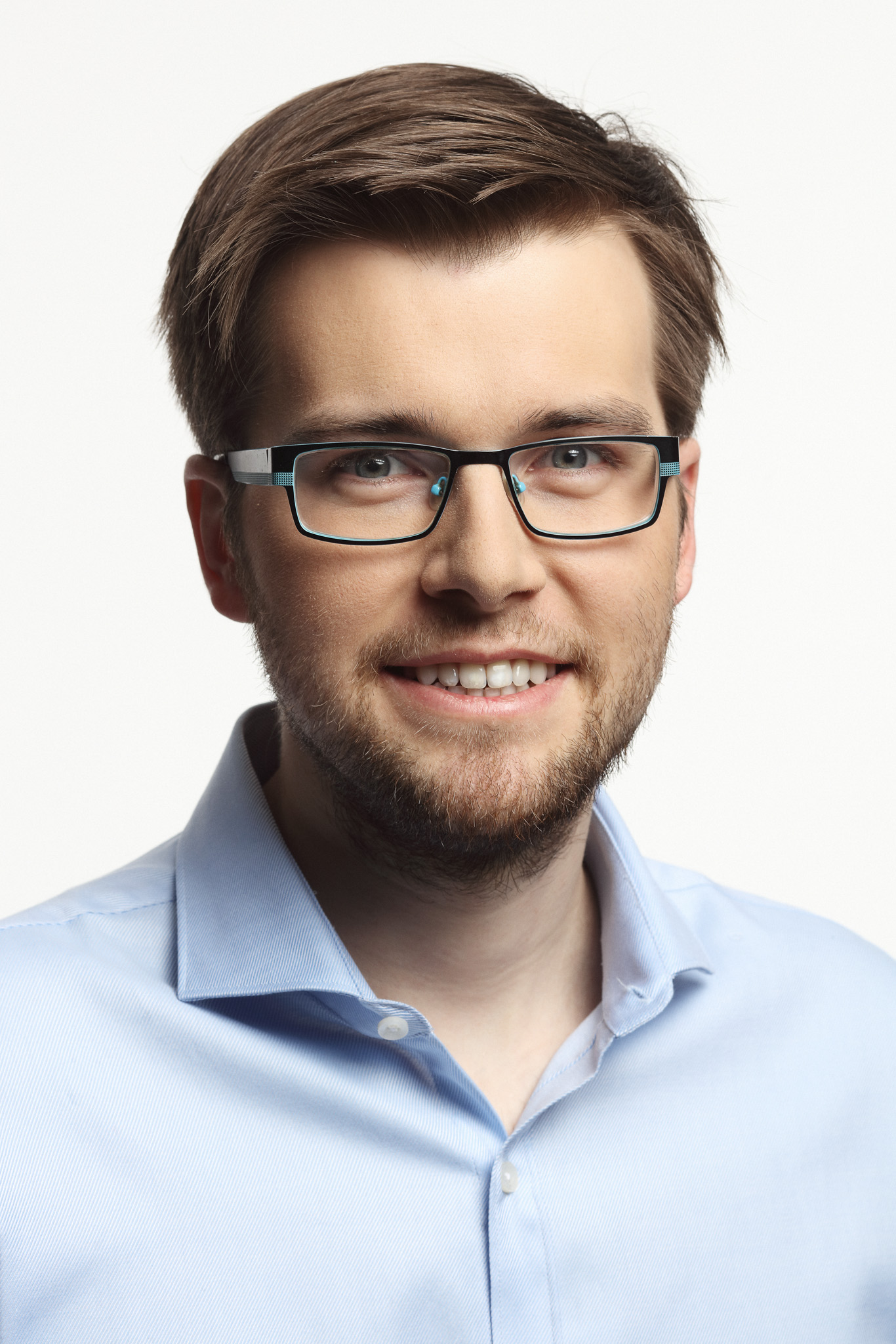
	First party	Second party	Third party
Leader	Adriana Krnáčová	Tomáš Hudeček	Petr Štěpánek
Party	ANO	TOP 09	Greens
Seats won	17	16	8
Popular vote	4,574,610	4,158,226	2,323,976
Percentage	22.1%	20.1%	11.2%
	Fourth party	Fifth party	Sixth party
Leader	Bohuslav Svoboda	Miloslav Ludvík	Marta Semelová
Party	ODS	ČSSD	KSČM
Seats won	8	8	4
Popular vote	2,273,722	2,160,963	1,225,102
Percentage	11.0%	10.4%	5.91%
	Seventh party
Leader	Jakub Michálek
Party	Pirates
Seats won	4
Popular vote	1,101,081
Percentage	5.31%
Mayor before election
Tomáš Hudeček
TOP 09
Elected mayor
Adriana Krnáčová
ANO 2011

The 2014 Prague municipal election was held as part of 2014 Czech municipal elections. It was held on 10 and 11 October 2014. ANO 2011 won the election and Adriana Krnáčová became the first female mayor of Prague.

Prior election, there was a conflict whether Prague should be one or 7 electoral districts. It was decided that there will be only one district.

== Opinion polling ==
Published	Company	TOP 09	3K	ANO 2011	ČSSD	ODS	KSČM	SSO	Piráti	DAWN	Restart 2014	For Prague	Democrats of Jan Kasl	Patriots	Others
10 - 11 Oct 2014	Election	20.1	11.2	22.1	10.4	11.0	5.9	3.6	5.3	1.0	0.2	2.4	2.5	0.3	
29 Sep 2014	Sanep	19.7	13.8	16.3	11.7	7.9	7.2	5.3	4.7	1.4	1.9	5.3	N/A	N/A	4.8
16 - 30 Sep 2014	Phoenix Research	17.2	6.9	14.5	13.0	7.0	5.8	3.0	3.3	2.1	1.4	2.2	0.6	0.5	5.6
1 - 18 Sep 2014	Phoenix Research	16.5	9.1	12.5	12.0	8.1	6.3	3.0	3.3	1.9	0.2	1.3	0.6	0.2	5.2
4-8 Sep 2014	STEM/Mark	14.0	6.0	20.0	9.0	8.0	3.0	4.0	5.0	4.0	N/A	4.0	N/A	N/A	
1 - 18 Aug 2014	Phoenix Research	18.8	15.3	10.1	10.2	8.2	6.3	3.8	4.5	1.9	0.1	0.9	1.1	0.1	5.2
17 October 2011	iDnes Survey	35.0	13.0	N/A	9.0	20.0	2.0	N/A	N/A	N/A	N/A	N/A	N/A	N/A	1.3

== Results ==
ANO 2011 won more than 20% of votes and 17 seats. TOP 09 came second with 16 seats. Other parties that got over 5% threshold were Three-Coalition (Green Party, Christian and Democratic Union – Czechoslovak People's Party and Mayors and Independents), Civic Democratic Party, Czech Social Democratic Party, Communist Party of Bohemia and Moravia and Czech Pirate Party.

Party	Vote	%Vote	Seats
ANO 2011	4,574,610	22.08	17
TOP 09	4,158,226	20.07	16
Three-Coalition	2,323,976	11.22	8
Civic Democratic Party	2,273,722	10.97	8
Czech Social Democratic Party	2,160,963	10.43	8
Communist Party of Bohemia and Moravia	1,225,102	5.91	4
Czech Pirate Party	1,101,081	5.31	4
Party of Free Citizens	741,503	3.58	0
Democrats of Jan Kasl	512,068	2.47	0
For Prague	496,821	2.40	0
Others	Less than 300,000	Less than 2.00	0
