= Domovina =

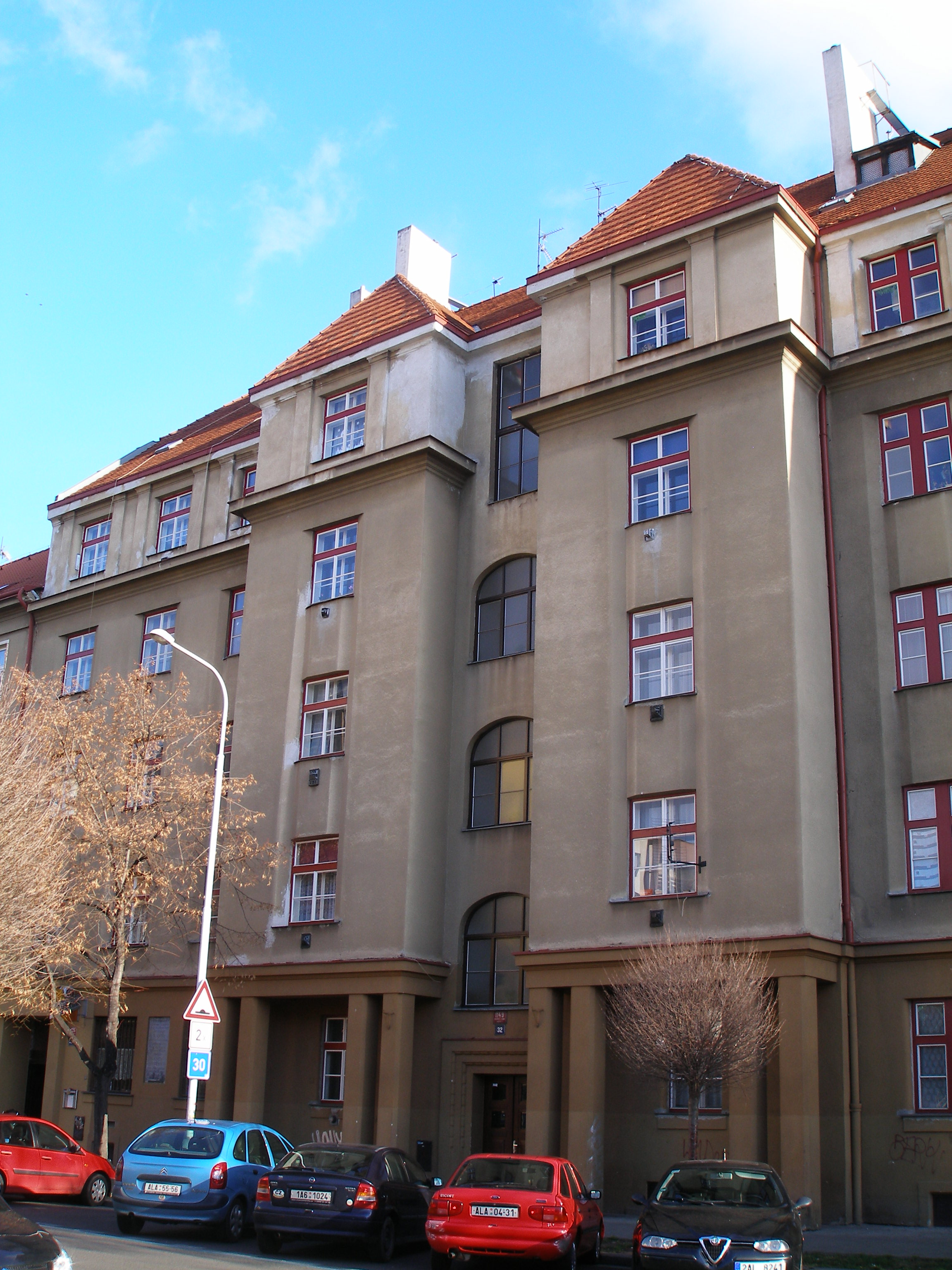
- Interactive map of the Domovina area

General information
- Location: Prague, Czech Republic
- Coordinates: 50.103817°N 14.452722°E
- Construction started: 1919
- Completed: 1921

Design and construction
- Architects: Otto V. Máca and Karel Roštík

Domovina (in English: Homeland) is a modernist building in Prague 7-Holešovice. It was built between 1919 and 1922 to house a co-operative of railway workers and conductors. The building was designed by Otto V. Máca a Karel Roštík and is listed as a cultural monument of the Czech Republic.

On 18 to 23 February 1929, a congress of the Communist Party of Czechoslovakia took place in the Domovina hall. Klement Gottwald was elected the chairman of the party. On the facade, there is a plaque commemorating this event.
