= Prague Together =

Prague Together Praha sobě
- Abbreviation: PS
- Leader: Adam Scheinherr
- Founded: 2017
- Split from: KDU-ČSL
- Colours: Yellow
- Prague Council: 11 / 65
- Local Assemblies: 66 / 61,900

Website
- www.prahasobe.cz

Prague Together (Czech: Praha sobě, lit. 'Prague for itself') is an association of independent candidates in Prague. It was created for the 2018 Prague municipal election by KDU-ČSL MP Jan Čižinský. The main representatives are Adam Scheinherr and Hana Třeštíková. It was created on the basis of a similar initiative Praha 7 sobě, which in 2014 won the elections to the municipal council of the Prague 7 district. The association is made up of active citizens, tries to connect with local associations and "to present itself as a principled alternative to the existing municipal establishment with the aim of winning the elections." For the 2022 Prague municipal election it was turned into a political party.

== History ==
On 12 December 2017, the group announced that it intended to collect 100,000 signatures, which would allow it to run as an association of independent candidates under the Act on Municipal Council Elections. The motto of the petition was "A Prague that you can sign up for" (Czech: Praha, pod kterou se můžete podepsat.)

Prague Together eventually collected 97,095 signatures and launched its campaign for the 2018 Prague municipal election based on volunteers. Prague Together received 16.57% of votes finishing third. The movement then became part of the governing coalition in Prague.

Prague Together tried to collect 100,000 signatures for the 2022 Prague municipal election but failed having gathered only 92,565 signatures and thus ran as a political party. The party finished 4th, with 14.73% of the vote.

A leadership election for Prague Together was held on 13 March 2024, incumbent leader Čižinský declined to run, while Adam Scheinherr received 27 votes against Petr Zeman's 10 and became the new leader.

== Election results ==
=== Prague municipal elections ===
Year	Leader	Vote	Vote %	Seats	+/−	Place	Position
2018	Jan Čižinský	4,197,578	16.6	13 / 65	new	3rd	Coalition
2022	Jan Čižinský	3,472,648	14.7	11 / 65	▼2	4th	Opposition
2026	Adam Scheinherr	4,403,312	17.9	13 / 65	▲2	3rd	Coalition

=== Senate ===
Election	First round			Second round			Seats	Total seats	+/–
Election	Votes	%	Place	Votes	%	Place	Seats	Total seats	+/–
2026	9,824	0.85	17th	6,608	1.40	12th	0 / 27	0 / 81	New
