= 2012 Communist Party of Bohemia and Moravia leadership election =

- 19 May 2012
- Turnout: 89.8%
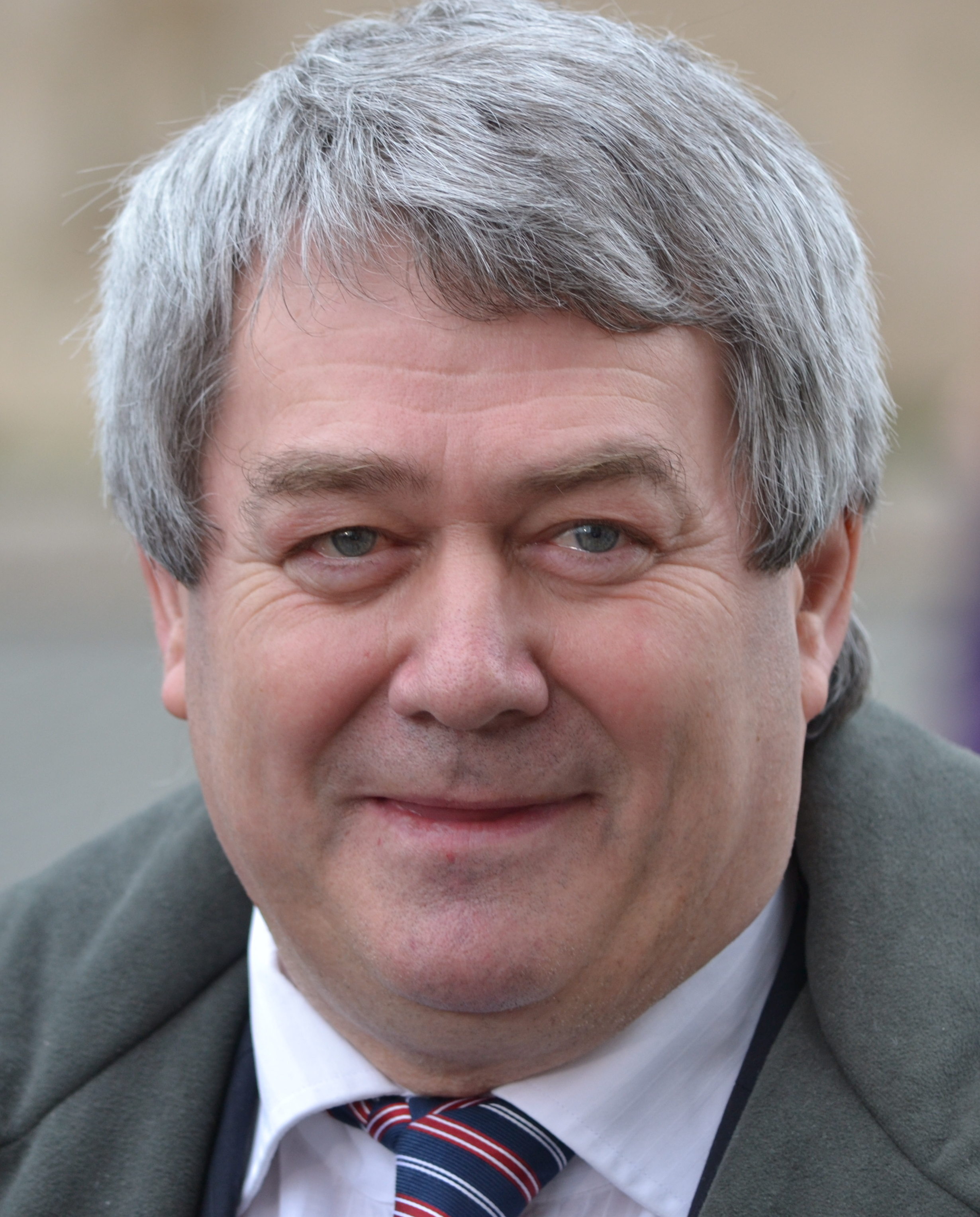

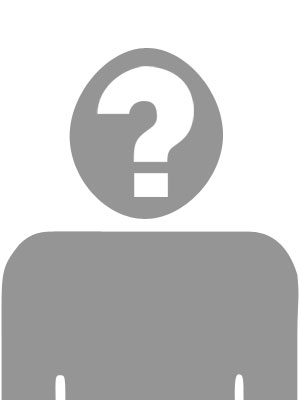
Candidate	Vojtěch Filip	Stanislav Grospič
Electoral vote	275	168
Percentage	62.1%	37.9%
Leader of KSČM before election
Vojtěch Filip
Elected Leader of KSČM
Vojtěch Filip

The Communist Party of Bohemia and Moravia (KSČM) held a leadership election on 19 May 2012. Incumbent leader Vojtěch Filip faced Stanislav Grospič. Potential candidates included Miroslav Grebeníček, Marta Semelová and Jiří Dolejš. Filip was reelected when he received 275 votes from delegates while Grospiš only 168 votes.

== Result ==
Candidate	Votes	%
Vojtěch Filip	275	62.08%
Stanislav Grospič	168	37.92%
