= Budoucnost =

Political movement in the Czech Republic

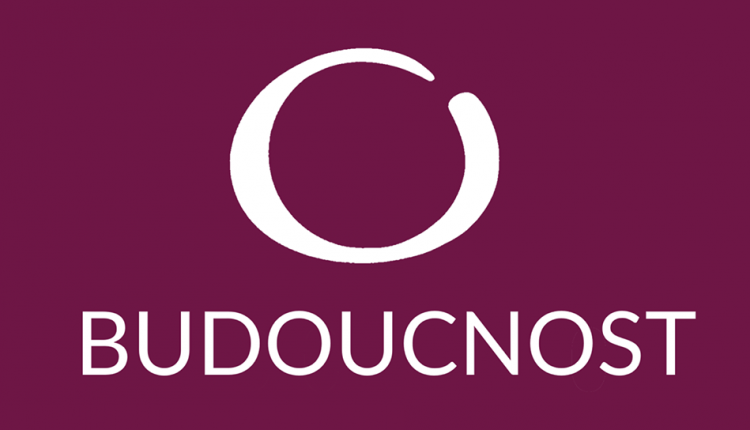
- Chairman: Jakub Kovařík; Klára Školníková
- Founded: 22 May 2020
- Split from: Idealists.cz; Green Party
- Headquarters: Čajkovského 1671/25, Prague
- Ideology: Democratic socialism Social democracy Left-wing populism
- Political position: Left-wing
- European affiliation: Central-Eastern European Green Left Alliance
- Chamber of Deputies: 0 / 200
- Senate: 0 / 81
- European Parliament: 0 / 21
- Local councilors: 4 / 61,780

Website
- https://volim-budoucnost.cz/

Budoucnost (lit. 'Future') is a left-wing political movement in the Czech Republic, founded in May 2020. It is co-led by Jakub Kovařík and Klára Školníková.

== History ==
The movement was registered in May 2020. Part of its preparatory committee consisted of former members of Idealists.cz and the Zelená re:vize organization associated with the Green Party. In the 2020 Senate elections, the movement joined the Social Democrats (ČSSD) and the Greens in supporting the candidacies of Jiří Dienstbier Jr. and Michal Šmarda.

In the 2022 municipal elections, Budoucnost ran for the Prague City Assembly as part of the Solidarity coalition with ČSSD, the Greens, and the Idealists Movement, but did not win any seats. The movement stood candidates in 16 other seats, with four members elected in Jilemnice, Slaný, Neratovice and Horní Domaslavice.

Budoucnost endorsed Josef Středula in the 2023 presidential election. He withdrew his candidacy on 8 January 2023.

In the 2024 European Parliament election, four members of Budoucnost ran on the candidate list of Social Democracy.

The movement aligned with The Left for the 2025 Czech parliamentary election.

== Program ==
Budoucnost calls for a suspension of distraint by private entities and easing of debt relief by increasing pensions and reducing labor taxation. They would make housing more affordable in large cities by building public and cooperative housing, capping rent, fighting homelessness and limiting rental services such as Airbnb. The movement wants to address oligarchy by introducing wealth taxes, as well as tightening media ownership and campaign finance laws. Other priorities of the movement include ending privatisation, creating new state enterprises (particularly a public bank and phone operator) and transitioning to a carbon-free economy financed by those who have profited from the climate crisis.
