= Solidarity (Czech Republic) =

Solidarity Solidarita
- Leader: Anna Šabatová
- Founded: 6 June 2022
- Ideology: Progressivism; Environmentalism; Social democracy Green politics Localism
- Political position: Centre-left to left-wing
- Coalition members: ČSSD; Greens; Idealists; Budoucnost
- Colours: Purple; Green
- Slogan: «Solidarity against selfishness» (Czech: «Solidarita proti sobectví»)
- Prague City Assembly: 0 / 65

Website
- solidarita2022.cz (archived)

Solidarity (Czech: Solidarita) is a Prague electoral coalition formed for the 2022 City Council election. Its members are ČSSD, Green Party, Idealists and Budoucnost, headed by former ombudswoman Anna Šabatová, who is running as an independent candidate.

The coalition officially launched its campaign on 6 June 2022 in front of the Municipal House in thecity centre. Its slogan is "Solidarity against selfishness".

== Program ==
The coalition profiles itself as a "progressive project that emphasizes ecological and economic sustainability and social justice".

It advocates a solution to the housing crisis through the large-scale construction of affordable city-owned apartments so that they could be available to the middle class in addition to those most in need, support for cooperative construction, support for the Housing First project, strengthening of tenants' rights or granting developers the obligation to transfer part of new housing construction to the city fund. It also supports greater investments in public transport, schools and nurseries, social services, culture, urban greenery and other forms of adaptation to climate change or policies aimed at reducing the cost of living for youth, families, seniors and low-income residents of Prague.
