= Adriana Krnáčová =

Czech businesswoman and politician

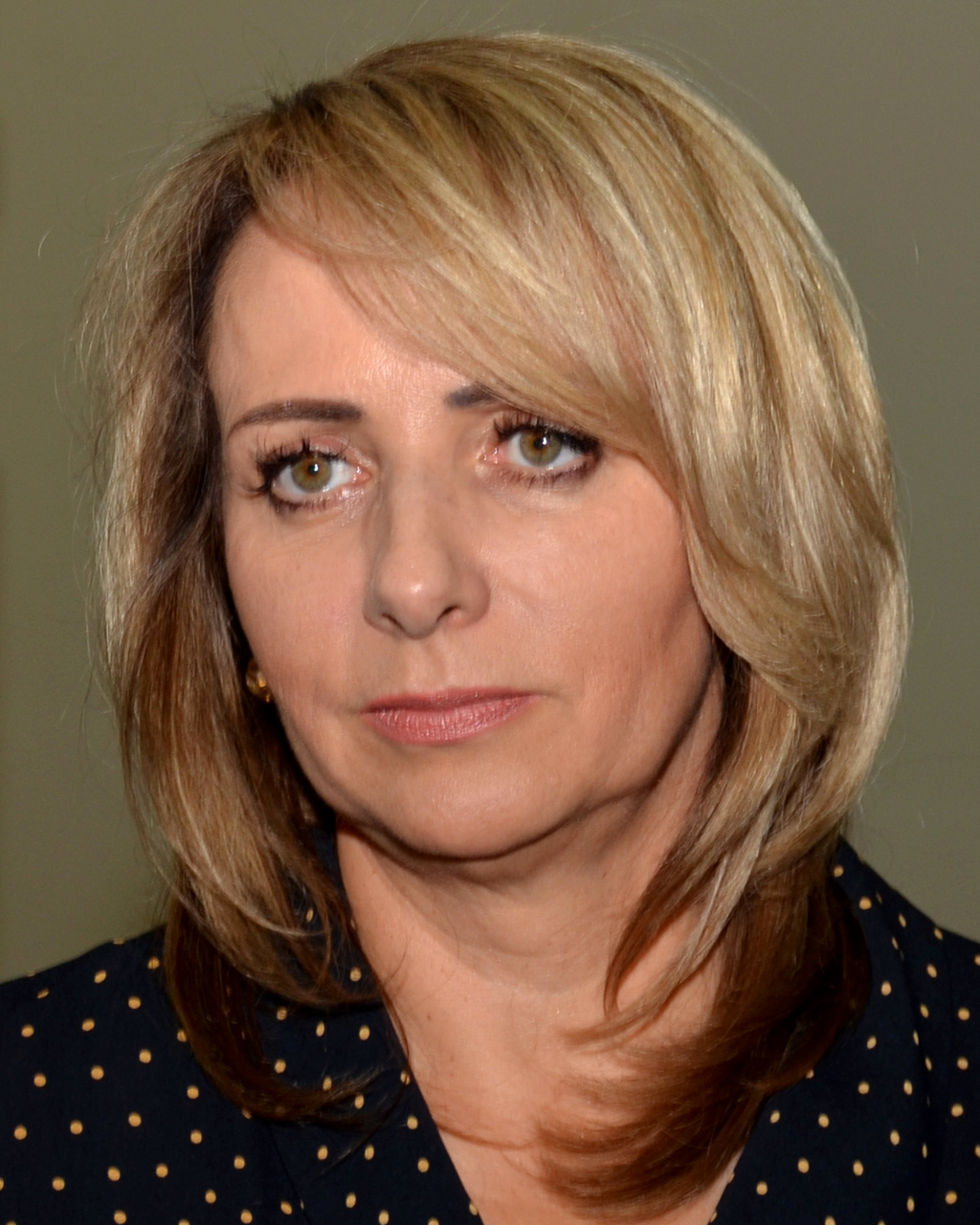

Mayor of Prague
- In office 26 November 2014 – 15 November 2018
- Preceded by: Tomáš Hudeček
- Succeeded by: Zdeněk Hřib

Personal details
- Born: 26 September 1960 (age 66) Bratislava, Czechoslovakia (now Slovakia)
- Party: Non-partisan; nominated by ANO 2011
- Education: Comenius University
- Occupation: Politician

Adriana Krnáčová (born 26 September 1960) is a Czech businesswoman and a politician. She was the mayor of Prague from November 2014 until November 2018, becoming the first woman to serve in this position.

Prior to becoming Mayor of Prague, Krnáčová was head of the Czech branch of Transparency International, and was also briefly Deputy Interior Minister for Public Administration in the Government of the Czech Republic.

== Mayor of Prague ==
Krnáčová was elected Mayor as a representative of the ANO 2011 party, which was founded and is currently led by Andrej Babiš. In the 2014 local election, ANO 2011 won 22.1% of the vote, electing 17 councillors (out of 65), while Krnáčová herself won 1.63% of the vote. She replaced Tomáš Hudeček who had been mayor since 20 June 2013.

In the 2018 Prague municipal election, she declined to run for a seat in the Municipal Assembly and was succeeded as mayor by the Pirate Party candidate Zdeněk Hřib.

== Personal life ==
Krnáčová is of Slovak origin. She is divorced with three children.

Political offices
Preceded by Tomáš Hudeček	Mayor of Prague; 2014–2018	Succeeded by Zdeněk Hřib
