= Bio Oko =

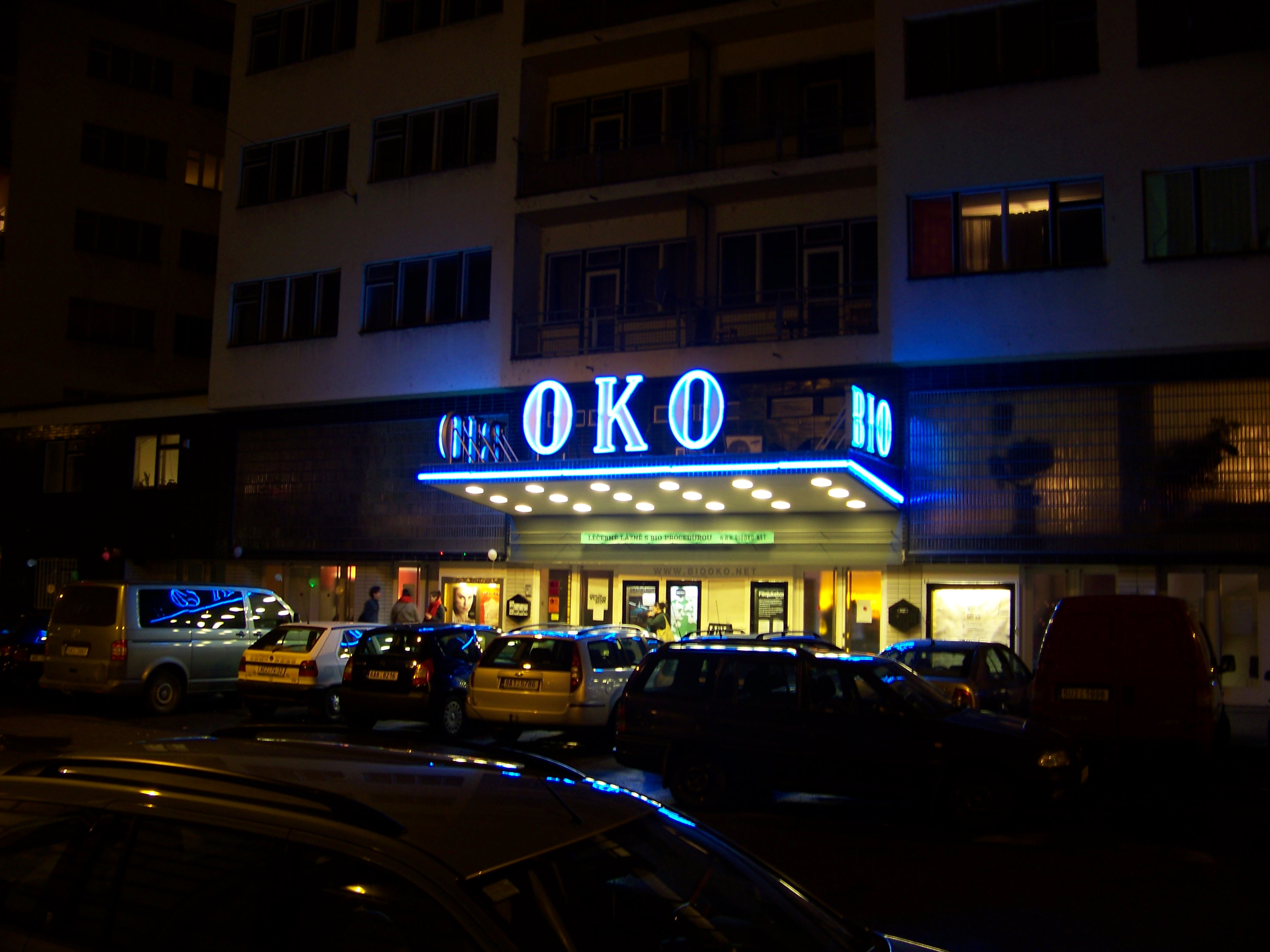
- Bio Oko at night, 2011
- Interactive map of Bio Oko
- Address: Františka Křížka 460/15; Prague; Czech Republic
- Coordinates: 50°6′0″N 14°25′0″E
- Capacity: 800 (original); 397
- Current use: Premiere cinema
- Public transit: C Vltavská

Construction
- Opened: 1940
- Rebuilt: 2007
- Years active: 1940–present
- Architects: Jaroslav Stockar-Bernkopf and Josef Šolc

Website
- Official website

Bio Oko is a cinema in the Holešovice district of Prague, Czech Republic. Part of a seven-building development between the district's Milada Horáková and Heřmanová streets built between 1937 and 1940, it was designed by Jaroslav Stockar-Bernkopf and Josef Šolc. The cinema is known for its seating options; as well as standard seats, visitors to Bio Oko can sit on sofas, bean bags or deck chairs. The cinema was reopened in October 2007 after a period of reconstruction, with the premiere of the Czech film Mír s tuleni. Bio Oko switched to digital projection in 2011, thanks to funding from Prague 7 and the Ministry of Culture.
