= Tomáš Hudeček =

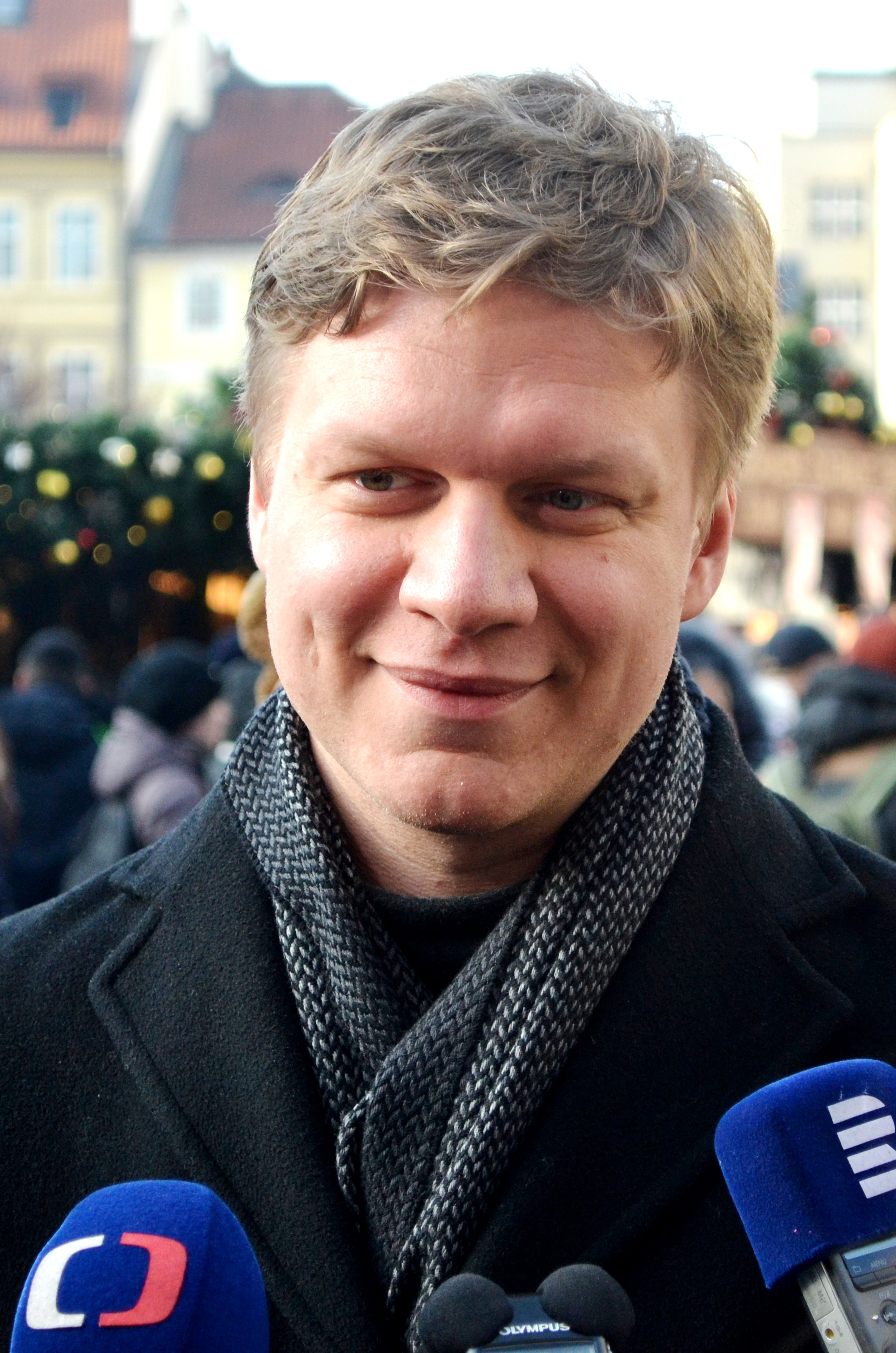
- Tomáš Hudeček (2013)

Mayor of Prague
- In office 20 June 2013 – 26 November 2014
- Preceded by: Bohuslav Svoboda
- Succeeded by: Adriana Krnáčová

Personal details
- Born: 10 May 1979 (age 47) Olomouc, Czechoslovakia
- Party: TOP 09 (2009–2014); Independent (2014–present)
- Education: Palacký University, Olomouc; Charles University in Prague

Tomáš Hudeček (born 10 May 1979 in Olomouc) is a Czech university (assoc.) professor and former politician. He is currently the head of the Department of Public Administration and Regional Studies at the Masaryk Institute of Advanced Studies of the Czech Technical University in Prague, a former local (non-party) politician and the Mayor of the Capital City of Prague. He is married with three sons and resides in Prague and Ostrava, alternatively.

In 2010 he was elected to the Municipal Assembly in Prague as a candidate of the TOP 09 party. On 24 November 2011 he became a member of the executive council of Prague and the Deputy Mayor of Bohuslav Svoboda. Hudeček was elected deputy mayor of Prague between 24 November 2011 and 23 May 2013, then deputy mayor with the responsibilities of Mayor during the flooding of May and June 2013 days in Prague, and Mayor of Prague between 20 June 2013 and 26 October 2014.

Political offices
Preceded by Bohuslav Svoboda	Mayor of Prague; 2013–2014	Succeeded by Adriana Krnáčová
