= Anna Šabatová =

Czech politician and former ombudsman

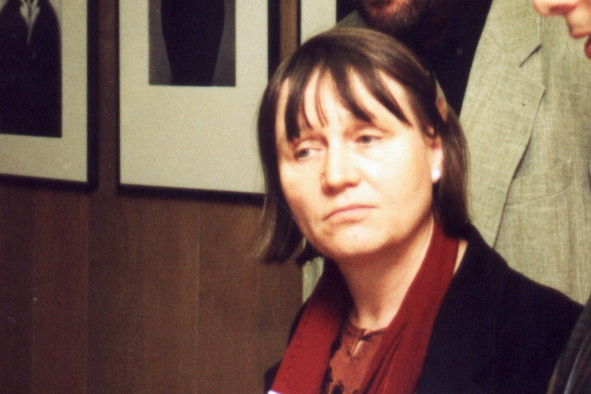
- Šabatová in 2001

Ombudsman of the Czech Republic
- In office 18 February 2014 – 18 February 2020
- Preceded by: Pavel Varvařovský
- Succeeded by: Stanislav Křeček

Personal details
- Born: 23 June 1951 (age 74) Brno, Czechoslovakia
- Party: Independent
- Other political affiliations: Solidarity (2022–present)

Anna Šabatová (born 23 June 1951) is a Czech politician, and former ombudsman of the Czech Republic. She was a signatory to Charter 77 and its spokesperson in 1986. Šabatová was awarded the United Nations Prize in the Field of Human Rights in 1998. She received the Czech Medal of Merit (First Grade) in 2002 and Order of Tomáš Garrigue Masaryk III. Class in 2024. In 2014, Šabatová was elected as the ombudsman of the Czech Republic, replacing Pavel Varvařovský.

In October 2020, she ran for the Senate in Brno but lost in the second round.
