= Patrik Nacher =

Czech banker, publicist and politician (born 1974)

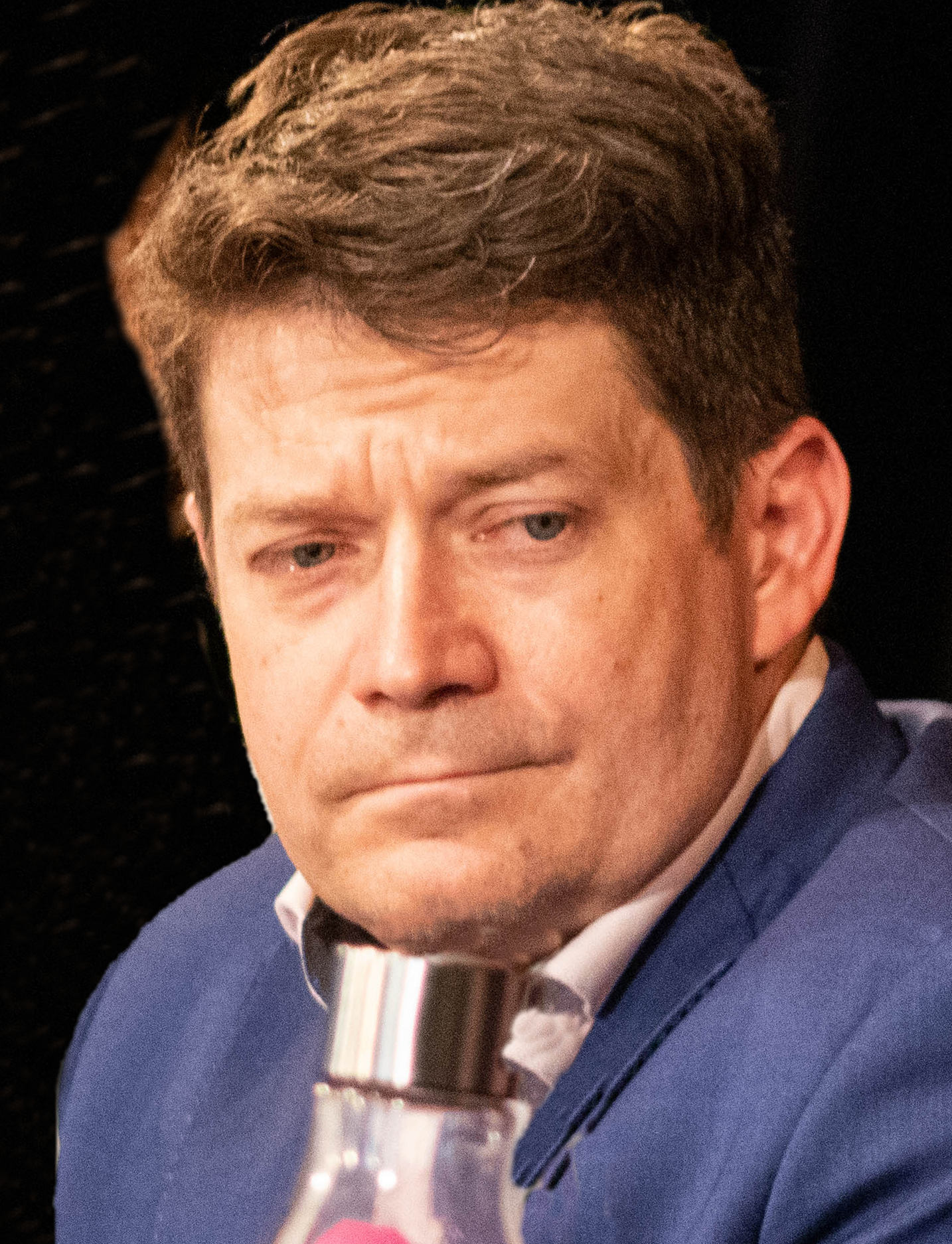
- Nacher in 2020

Member of the Chamber of Deputies
- Incumbent
- Assumed office 12 October 2017

1st Deputy President of the Chamber of Deputies
- Incumbent
- Assumed office 5 November 2025
- Preceded by: Věra Kovářová

Personal details
- Born: 17 October 1974 (age 51) Prague, Czechoslovakia
- Party: ODS (1996–1998); US-DEU (1998–2004); Independent (nominated by ANO 2011) (2014–2024); ANO 2011 (2024–)
- Education: Ambis University

Patrik Nacher (born 17 October 1974) is a Czech banker, publicist and politician. He serves in the Chamber of Deputies of the Czech Republic, representing Prague.

Prior to entering politics, Nacher worked in banking, managed a public relations firm, and wrote a periodical column on personal financial literacy for Lidové noviny. In parliament, he is affiliated with ANO 2011.
