= Idealists.cz =

Social-democratic organisation

Idealists.cz Idealisté.cz
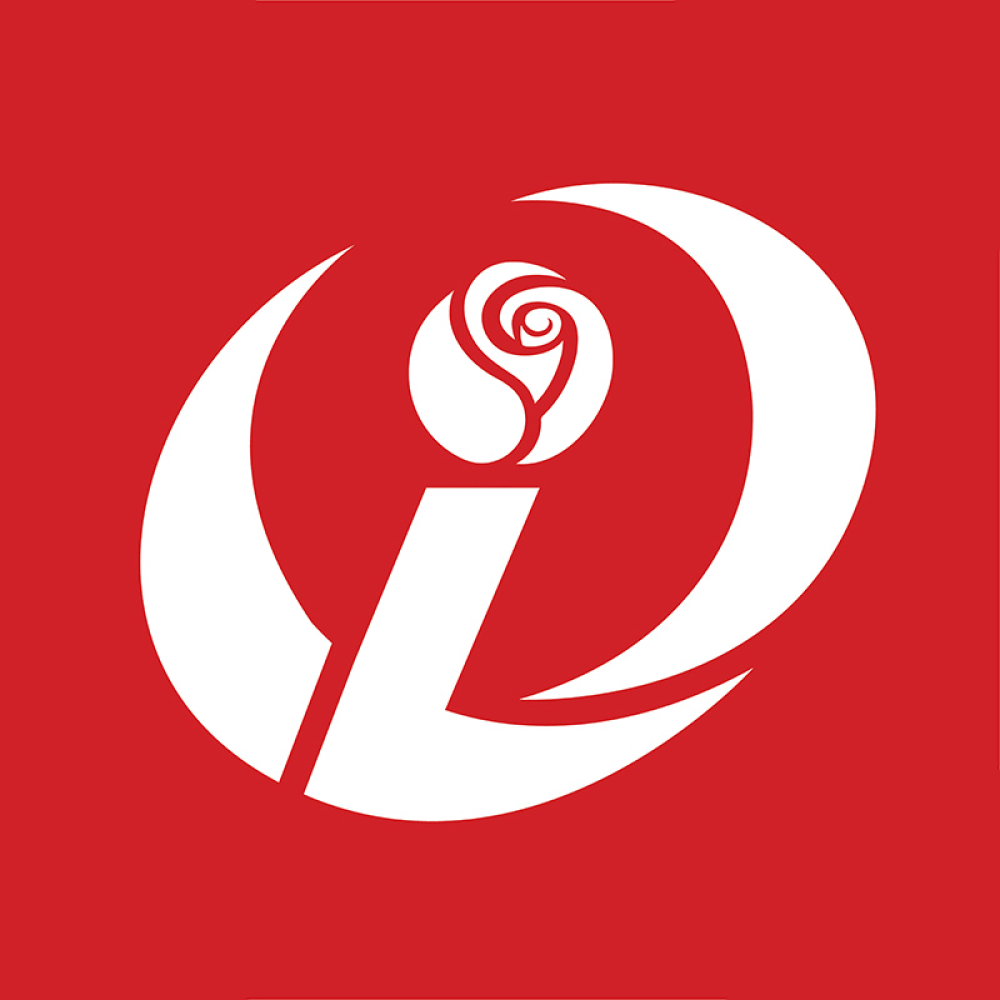
- Chairperson: Vojtěch Vašák
- Founded: 2 January 2015
- Headquarters: Prague
- Ideology: Progressivism; Social democracy
- Website: http://idealiste.cz/

Idealists.cz (Czech: Idealisté.cz) is a social-democratic organisation founded in 2015. Although part of the social-democratic movement, it is not formally associated with the Czech Social Democratic Party.

== History ==
Idealists were originally part of the Young Social Democrats (MSD) but became independent organisation in 2015. They were led by Radim Hejduk. Idealists seek more Progressive politics than MSD.

== Idealist movement ==
The Idealists movement is a Czech progressive political movement founded in June 2020. The Idealists movement continues the tradition of the Idealisté.cz association
