= Bohuslav Svoboda =

Czech politician and physician

Bohuslav Svoboda MP
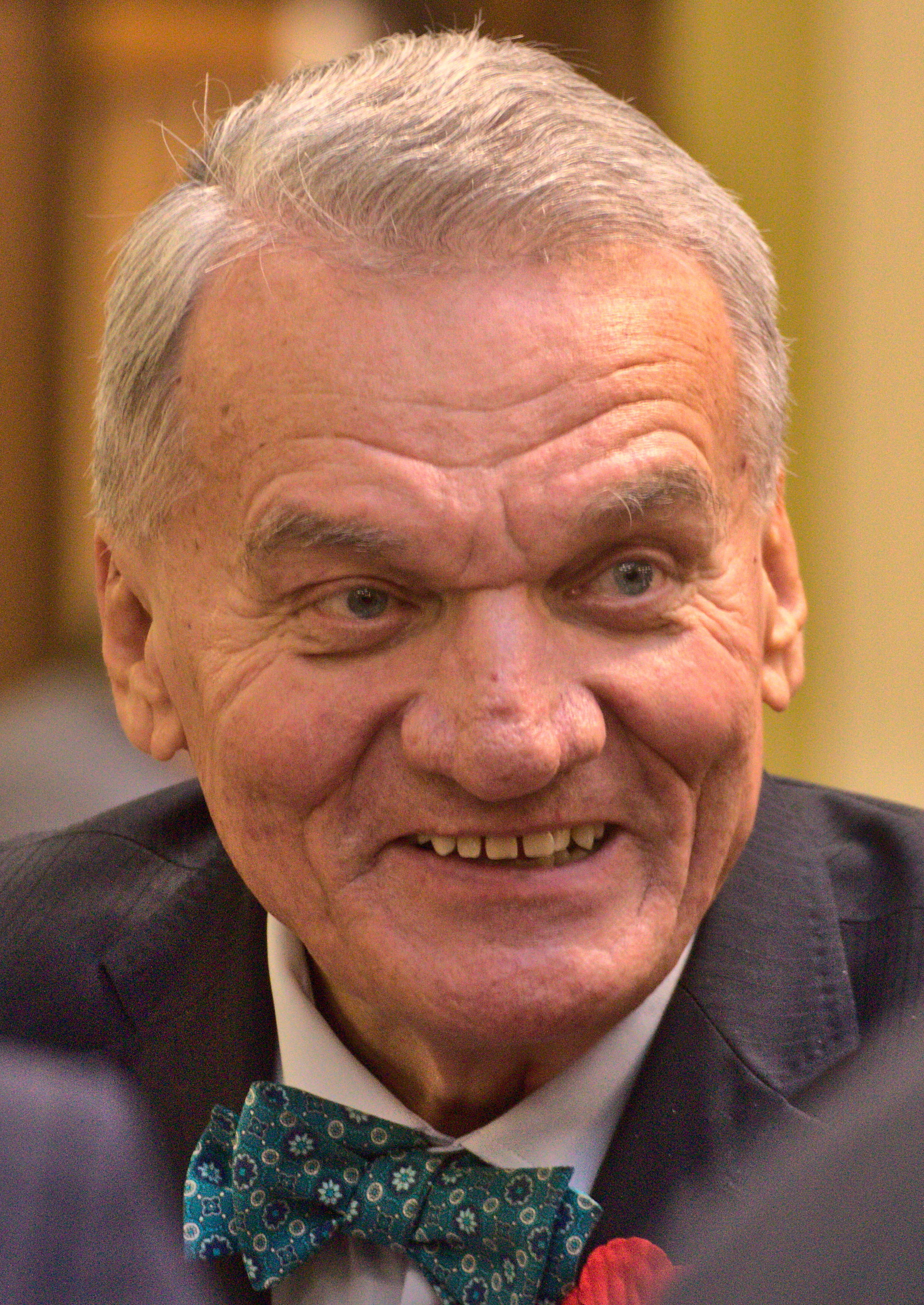
- Svoboda in 2022

Mayor of Prague
- In office 16 February 2023 – 19 November 2026
- Preceded by: Zdeněk Hřib
- Succeeded by: Petr Hlaváček
- In office 30 November 2010 – 23 May 2013
- Preceded by: Pavel Bém
- Succeeded by: Tomáš Hudeček

Member of the Chamber of Deputies
- In office 26 October 2013 – 8 October 2025

Personal details
- Born: 8 February 1944 (age 82) Prague, Protectorate of Bohemia and Moravia
- Party: ODS
- Education: Charles University

Bohuslav Svoboda (born 8 February 1944) is a Czech politician and gynaecologist who served as the mayor of Prague from 16 February 2023 to 19 November 2026 and from 30 November 2010 to 23 May 2013.

== Biography ==
Bohuslav Svoboda was born on 8 February 1944 in Prague. He attended Charles University and studied medicine. Before his second term as mayor, he served as the head of gynaecology clinics at Charles University Hospital and the Central Military Hospital in Prague.

Svoboda is a member of the Civic Democratic Party.

In the 2022 Prague municipal election Svoboda was leader of the Spolu coalition, which won the election. Forming a coalition with the Czech Pirate Party and STAN took 5 months of negotiations. On 16 February 2023, Svoboda was elected again as the mayor of Prague.

In March 2024, the Czech Green Party filed criminal charges against Svoboda for "spreading a contagious disease" after he deliberately attended a parliamentary health committee meeting despite suffering from whooping cough, which occurred during a nationwide surge in cases of the disease.

== See also ==
- One World Film Festival

Political offices
Preceded by Pavel Bém	Mayor of Prague; 2010–2013	Succeeded by Tomáš Hudeček
Preceded by Zdeněk Hřib	Mayor of Prague; 2023–2026	Succeeded by Petr Hlaváček
