= Prague 7 =

Prague 7 Praha 7
- Municipal District of Prague; Administrative District of Prague
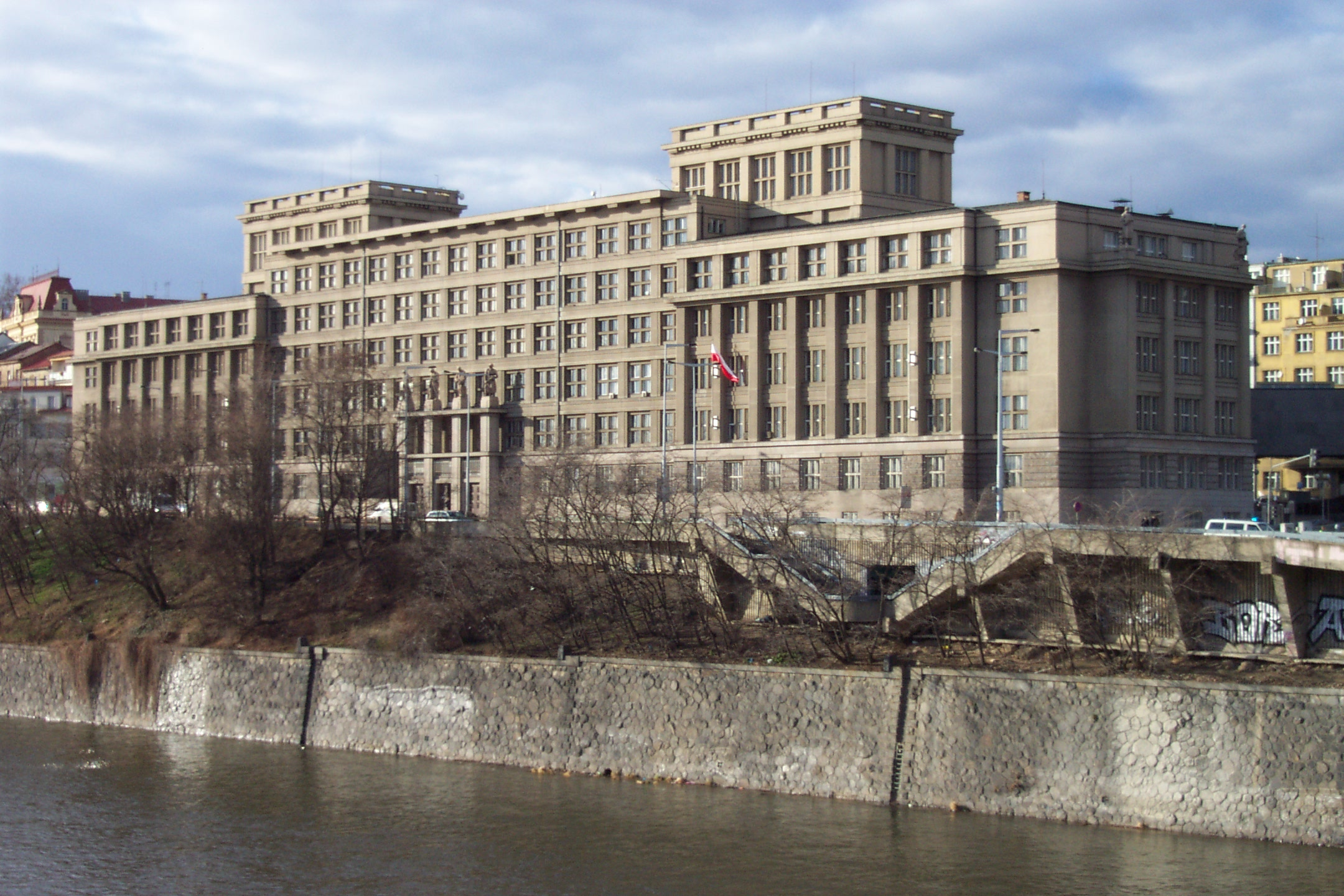
- Prague 7 town hall and financial office

- Flag Coat of arms

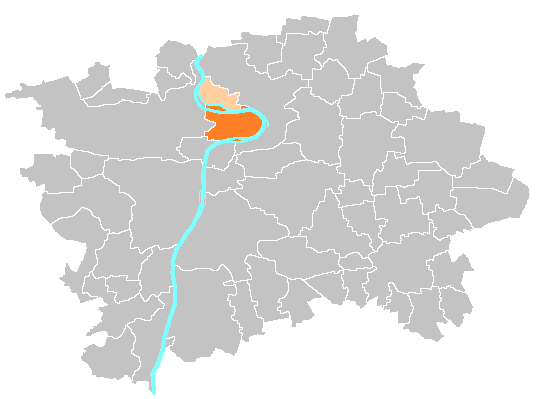
- Location of Prague 7 in Prague
- Coordinates: 50°6′2″N 14°26′8″E
- Country: Czech Republic
- Region: Prague

Government
  - Mayor: Jan Čižinský

Area
  - Total: 7.10 km^{2} (2.74 sq mi)

Population (2021)
  - Total: 44,442
  - Density: 6,260/km^{2} (16,200/sq mi)
- Time zone: UTC+1 (CET)
  - Summer (DST): UTC+2 (CEST)
- Postal code: 170 00
- Website: http://www.praha7.cz

Prague 7 is a municipal district (městská část) in Prague, Czech Republic.

The administrative district (správní obvod) of the same name consists of the quarters Letná, Holešovice, Bubny, Bubeneč, Troja as well as a small part of Libeň. It's one of the smallest Prague districts and stretches along the left bank of the Vltava. In the Northern part is located Troja with the Prague Zoo. It is linked to the city centre by metro line C. Other attractions in Prague 7 include the stadium of the Czech football club AC Sparta, cultural center DOX Centre for Contemporary Art, cinema Bio Oko, museums (National Technical Museum and National Museum of Agriculture), Academy of Fine Arts and the former trade fair centre Veletržní palác. Its parks Stromovka and Letná rank among the biggest in the capital.

== Demographics ==
Historical population
Year	Pop.	±%
1869	3,094	—
1880	10,852	+250.7%
1890	15,352	+41.5%
1900	30,797	+100.6%
1910	39,704	+28.9%
1921	46,335	+16.7%
1930	59,150	+27.7%
1950	73,031	+23.5%
1961	76,334	+4.5%
1970	68,041	−10.9%
1980	55,953	−17.8%
1991	46,224	−17.4%
2001	40,839	−11.6%
2011	41,429	+1.4%
2021	44,442	+7.3%
Source: Censuses

== See also ==
- Districts of Prague#Symbols
