= Jan Čižinský =

Czech politician

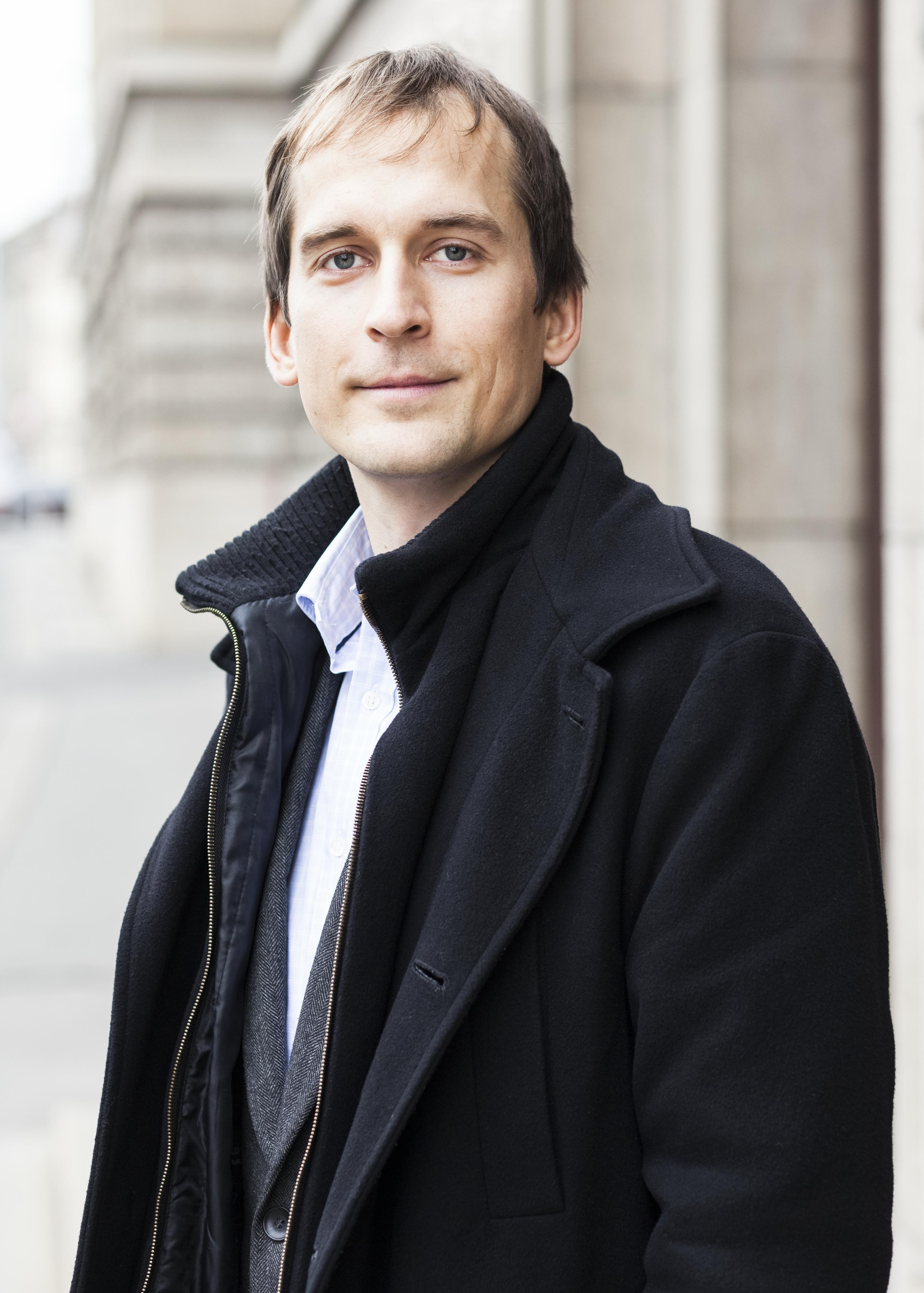
- Čižinský in 2014

Mayor of Prague 7
- Incumbent
- Assumed office 20 November 2014
- Preceded by: Marek Ječmének

Member of the Chamber of Deputies
- In office 21 October 2017 – 21 October 2021

Member of the Prague City Assembly
- Incumbent
- Assumed office 11 October 2014

Member of the Prague 7 Assembly
- Incumbent
- Assumed office 11 October 2014

Leader of Prague Together
- In office 2017 – 13 March 2024
- Preceded by: Position established
- Succeeded by: Adam Scheinherr

Personal details
- Born: 22 April 1978 (age 48) Prague, Czechoslovakia (now Czech Republic)
- Party: KDU-ČSL (2003–2018)
- Education: Charles University
- Occupation: politician; teacher

Jan Čižinský (born 22 April 1978) is a Czech teacher and politician who has been serving as the mayor of Prague 7 since November 2014 and Member of the Prague City Assembly since October 2014. Čižinský is a former leader of Prague Together association and former member of KDU-ČSL.

== Early life and education ==
Čižinský taught Latin, history, and the basics of social sciences at Malostranský Gymnasium. He was also active in the scout movement of Břevnov Monastery.

== Political career ==
=== Early political career ===
Prior to joining KDU-ČSL in 2003, Čižinský ran for the party as a non-party candidate and worked as an assistant to Cyril Svoboda and Marian Jurečka.

Čižinský ran as a non-party candidate for KDU-ČSL in the Prague 1 municipal council in the 1998 and 2002 Czech municipal elections, as well as the 2006 municipal elections as lead candidate of KDU-ČSL. Despite the high number of preferential votes that were cast for him, he was not elected as a KDU-ČSL candidate in the capital city of Prague, mainly during 2006, 2010, and 2013 parliamentary elections.

=== 2010s ===
After failing to be elected candidate in the municipal elections between 1998 and 2006, Čižinský moved to the Prague 7 district as KDU-ČSL candidate in the 2010 Czech municipal elections.

In 2013, Čižinský came to the attention of the residents of Prague 7 as the organizer of a referendum on the plan to build a new town hall building for this part of the city for around one billion CZK. Thanks to his extraordinary contribution, he received the White Lily For the same act, he received the "Chairman's Award" at KDU-ČSL convention in 2013 KDU-ČSL for civic bravery".

Čižinský became a representative of the city district after 2014 municipal elections as leading candidate of the entity Praha 7 himself (e.g. KDU-ČSL and non-partisans). The election movement won with 43.69% of the vote and he was elected mayor of Prague 7 on 20 November 2014. Čižinský was also elected as a member of KDU-ČSL to Prague City Council.

In the 2017 Czech parliamentary election, Čižinský won 6,746 preferential votes and jumped from second place to the leader of the candidate Daniel Herman, thus being elected member of parliament. At a press conference in front of Prague City Hall on 12 December, Čižinský announced the start of collecting 100,000 signatures of Prague voters to run for the City Council. On 31 July 2018, he submitted the candidate of Prague to himself as its leader, supported by a petition with 97,095 signatures of Prague citizens, and started the election campaign. Čižinský also lost his KDU-ČSL membership that was previously suspended.

In the 2018 municipal elections, Čižinský received 80,552 preferential votes, the most number of all the candidates.

=== 2020s ===
In the 2022 municipal elections, Čižinský was the leader of Prague Self group and therefore also a candidate for the position as mayor of Prague. Although he defended the mandate, the candidate led by him finished fourth with a gain of 14.73%, thus reduced its representation. Čižinský also defended his mandate as a representative of the Prague 7 district.

== Personal life ==
Čižinský's older brother, Pavel, served as mayor of Prague 1 between 2018 and 2020.
