= Marta Semelová =

Czech politician and educator (born 1960)

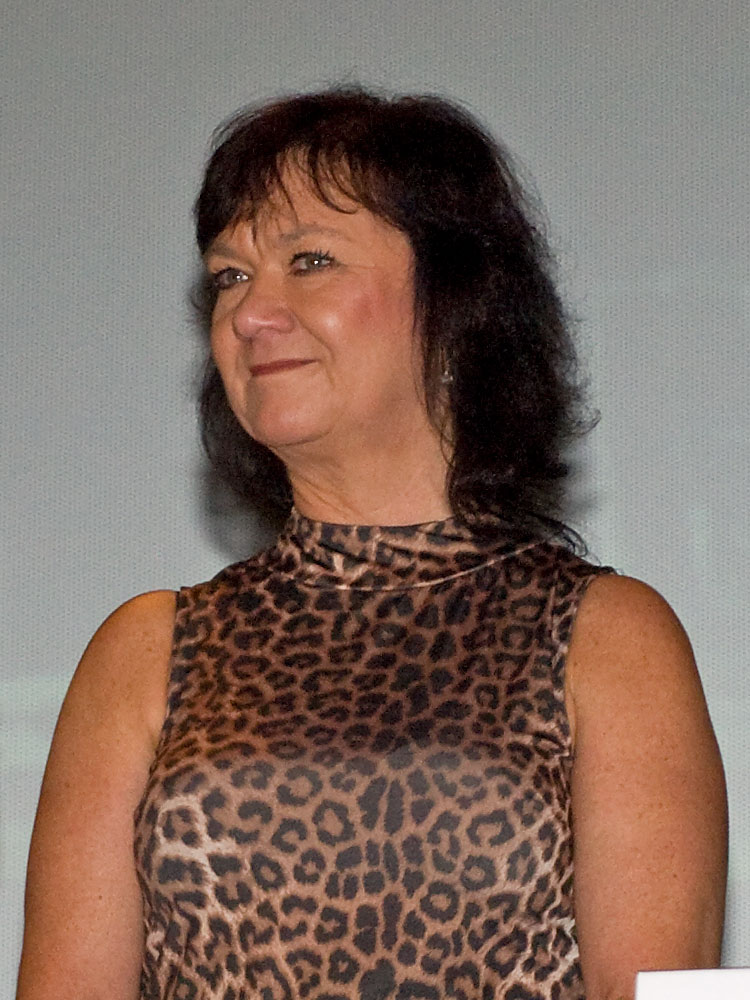

Member of the Chamber of Deputies
- In office 29 May 2010 – 26 October 2017

Personal details
- Born: March 1, 1960 (age 66) Prague, Czechoslovakia (now Czech Republic)
- Party: KSČM (1990–present); KSČ (1978-1990)
- Children: 2
- Education: Charles University
- Profession: Teacher

Marta Semelová (born 1 March 1960) is a Czech politician who served as a member of the Chamber of Deputies (MP) from 2010 to 2017, representing the Communist Party of Bohemia and Moravia. Before that, she had worked as a teacher of the first stage of primary school, chair of the Communist Party group of the Assembly of the City of Prague, and chair of the Prague council of the Communist Party.
