= Prague City Hall =

Municipal and regional office of Prague

Prague City Hall Magistrát hlavního města Prahy
- Coat of arms of Prague

Type
- Type: Regional and city district office of Prague

History
- Founded: 1 January 1922

Leadership
- Mayor: Bohuslav Svoboda

Meeting place
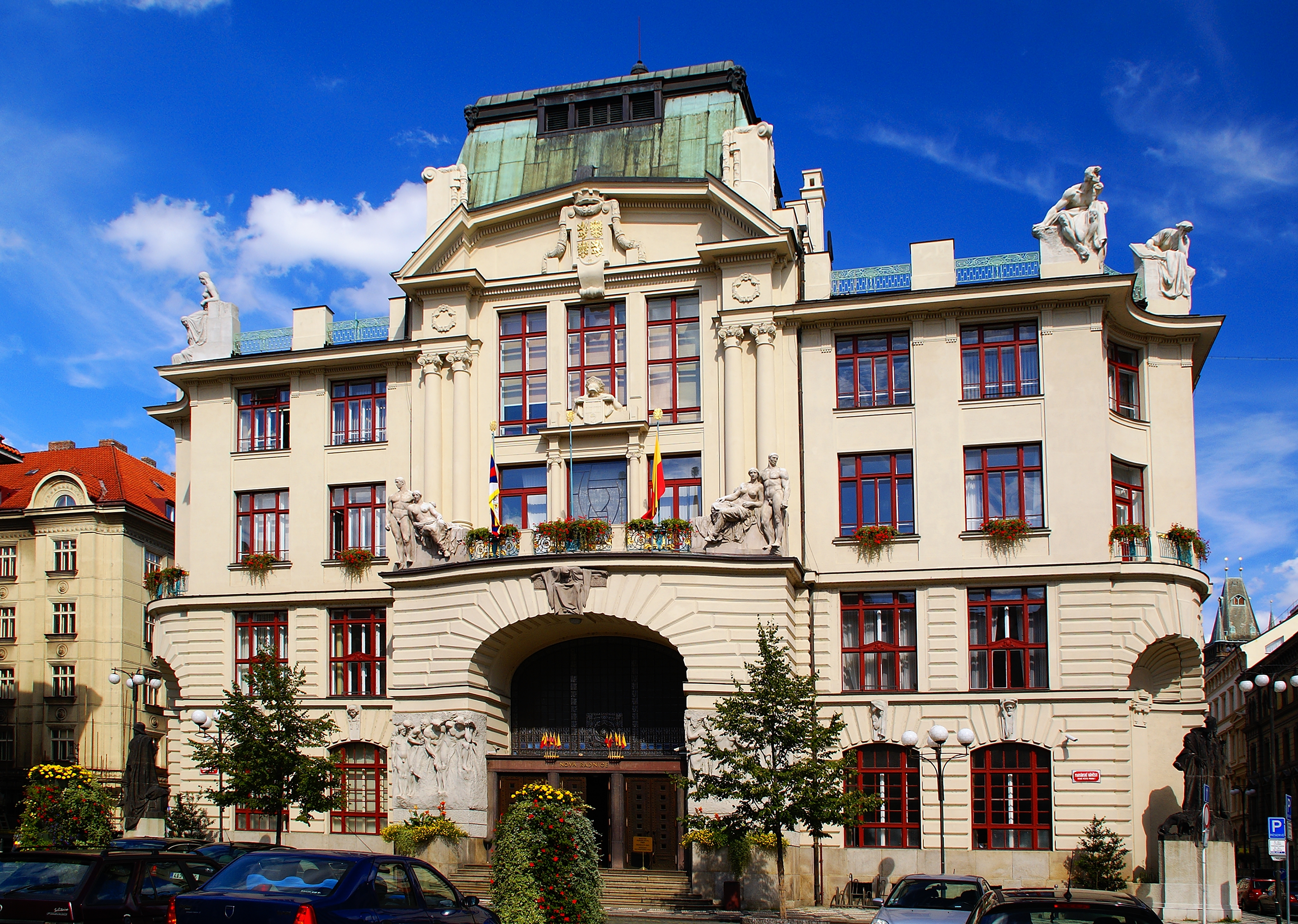
- Prague New City Hall

Website
- www.praha.eu/jnp/cz/o_meste/magistrat/index.html

Prague City Hall (Czech: Magistrát hlavního města Prahy) is the municipal and regional office of Prague, the capital of the Czech Republic. It is formed by the Chief Executive of Prague City Hall and other employees of the City of Prague included in this body. Prague City Hall performs tasks assigned by Prague City Assembly or Prague City Council, which are democratically elected. As of 2017, it employed 2,091 people and had a budget of 65,193 billion CZK (2,58 billion EUR).

Employees of Prague City Hall are located mainly in two buildings within the Prague city centre – in the New City Hall and in the Škoda Palace.

Its scope is defined by the Act on the City of Prague in the Czech law and the City Decree on the Statute of the City of Prague.

On 23 September 2019, the municipality announced a new selection procedure, to which candidates could apply until 31 October 2019. According to information from Lidové noviny, former mayor Adriana Krnáčová, among others, applied for the selection process. 6 applicants participated in the selection process. Krnáčová did not appear for the written tests, which are part of the selection process, because she was abroad on all the dates offered. Jiřina Vorlová resigned from the selection process. The remaining 4 applicants were thus invited to an oral interview: Tomáš Havel, Marta Kopecká, Karel Bláha and Radka Říhová.

== See also ==
- List of mayors of Prague
