= Abkhaz State Archive =

The Abkhaz State Archive (Abkhaz: Аҧсны Аҳәынҭқарра аҳәынҭқарратә архивтә усбарҭа, romanized: Apsny Ahwynthqarra ahwynthqarratº arhivtº usbartha; Russian: Государственное архивное управление Республики Абхазия, romanized: Gosudarstvennoye arkhivnoye upravleniye Respubliki Abkhaziya) is the main archive of Abkhazia, a disputed territory in the South Caucasus and breakaway republic of Georgia. It is located in Sukhumi, the capital of Abkhazia.

== History ==
The precursor of the Abkhaz State Archive was established in March 1929, when the Presidium of the Central Executive Committee and the Council of People's Commissars of the Socialist Soviet Republic of Abkhazia adopted a resolution about the "Organization of archival Affairs". In October 1992, during the War in Abkhazia, fire destroyed the archive building; on both sides of the conflict many believe that the archive was burned down intentionally by the Georgian forces. About 95% of the archived documents was destroyed. On the Georgian side, many people refute the idea that the archive was deliberately burned down. The same day as the Abkhaz State Archive burned down, the Abkhazian Scientific-Research Institute of Language, Literature and History (ABNII, founded in 1922 as the Abkhazian Scientific Society, Абхазское научное общество, АбНО/ABNO) burned down, too.

In the course of the Geneva International Discussions, the Georgian central government provided the de facto authorities of Abkhazia with important archival documents in 2015. Additionally, one year later a meeting of the head of the Abkhaz State Archive with the director of the National Archives of Georgia was planned.

2019/2020 material has been preserved with the help of Czech historians from the Czech National Archives.
