= 2022 Mayors and Independents leadership election =

- 23 July 2022
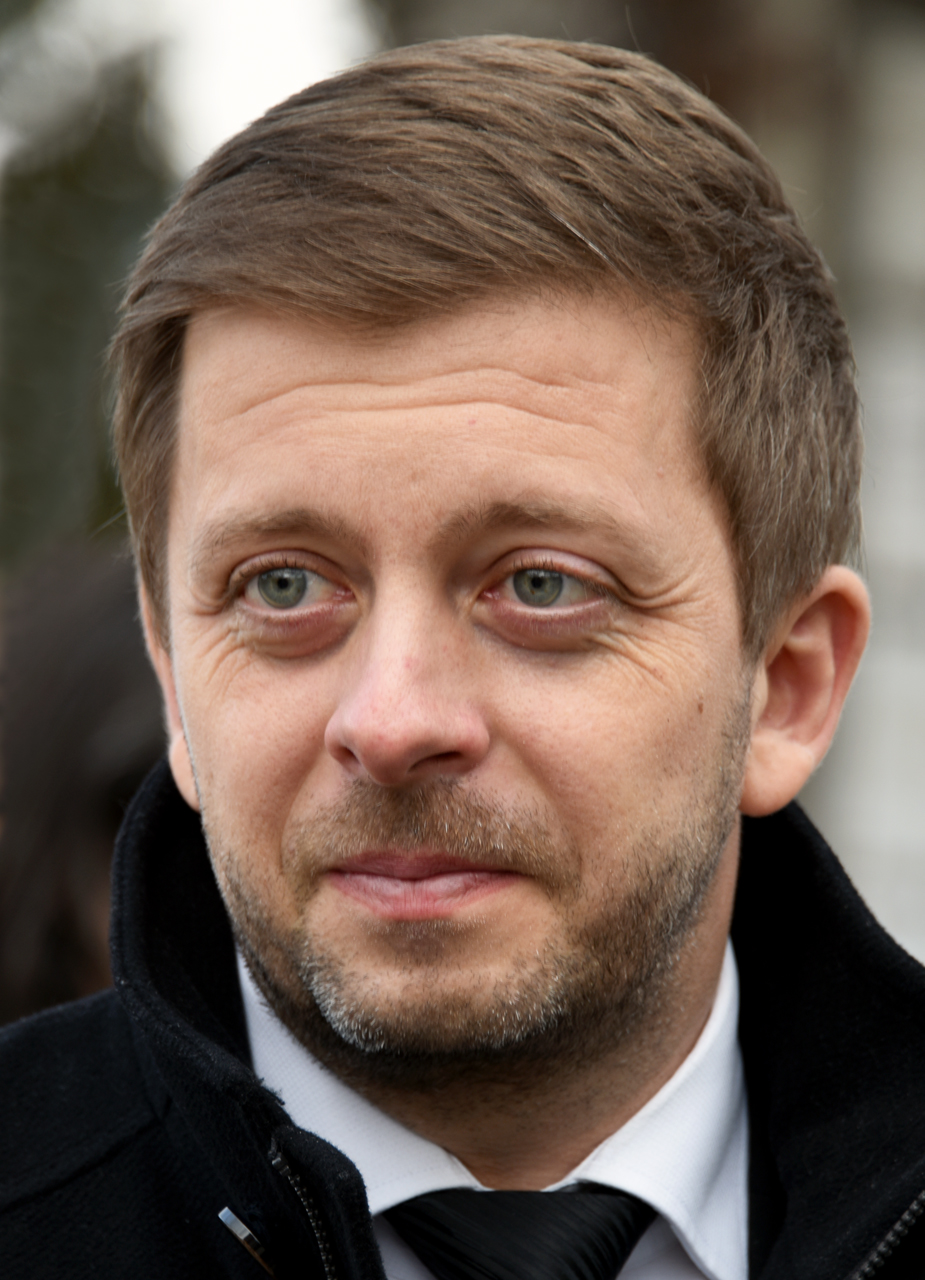
| Candidate | Vít Rakušan |
| Electoral vote | 292 |
| Percentage | 98.3% |
leader of STAN before election
Vít Rakušan
Elected leader of STAN
Vít Rakušan

A leadership election for the Mayors and Independents (STAN) in 2022 was held on 23 July 2022. The incumbent leader Vít Rakušan was elected for another term.

== Background ==
Rakušan led the party since 2019. The party formed electoral alliance for 2021 Czech legislative election with Czech Pirate Party called Pirates and Mayors. STAN made significant gains in the parliament as a result receiving 33 MPs and becoming third largest party in the Czech Republic. It became party of Cabinet of Petr Fiala.

Since legiaslative election STAN lost almost all of its Deputy leaders for various reasons which led Rakušan to call snap election to elect new leadership. Leadership election was originally scheduled for Fall 2022 but party was heavily affected by Dozimetr affair forcing the election to be held in Summer.

Despite the affair Rakušan decided to run for another term as party leader. He gained nominations of most regional organisations suggesting strong support from party membership. As of 2 July 2022 only Plzeň organisation didn't give its nomination to Rakušan.

== Election ==
Voting was held on 23 July 2022. Rakušan received 292 of 297 votes and thus was reelected.
