= Prague City Archives =

Department of Prague City Hall in the Czech Republic

Coordinates: 50°2′23.33″N 14°29′42.12″E

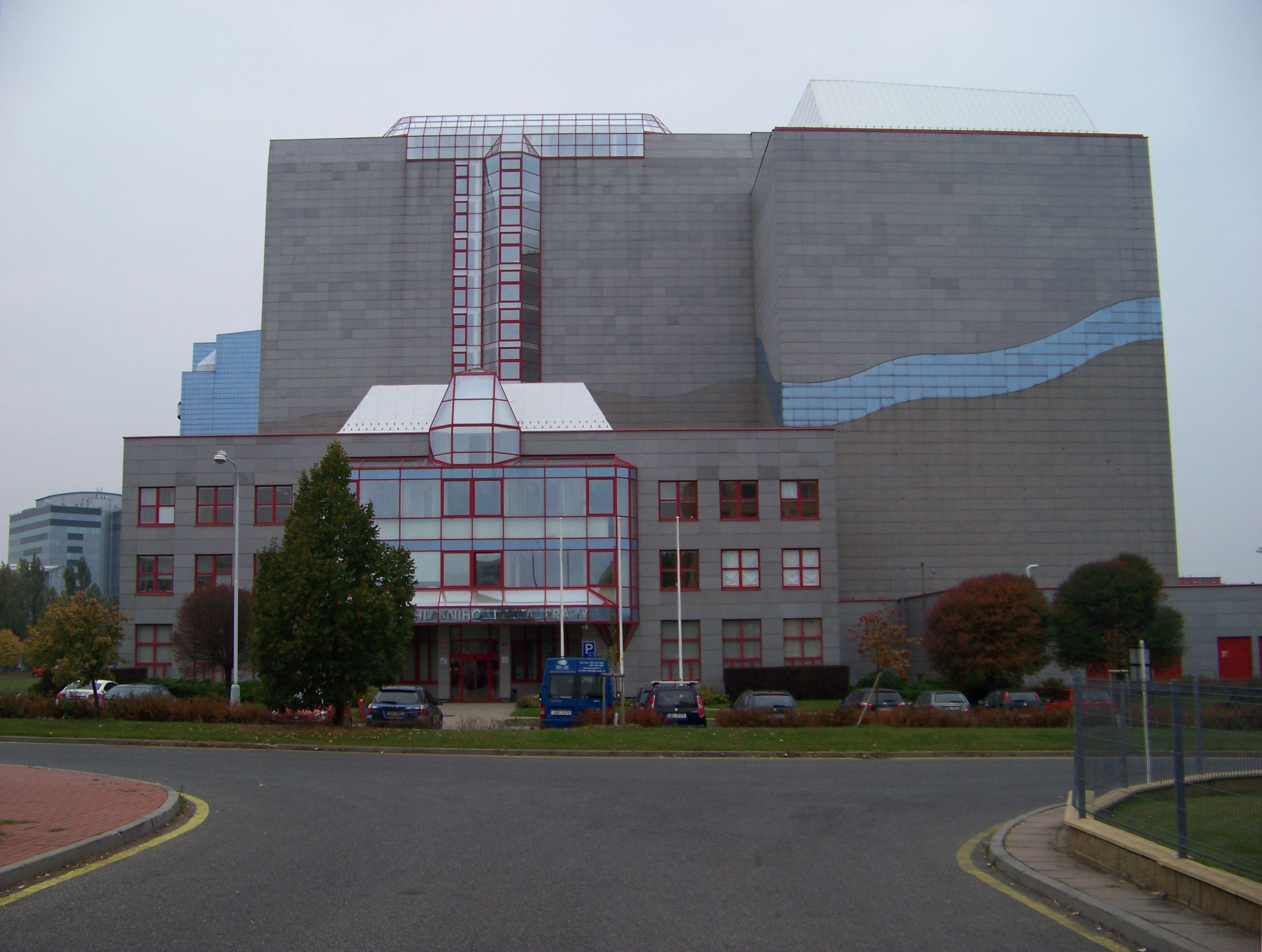
The new building of the Prague City Archives in Chodov (Prague)

The Prague City Archives (Czech: Archiv hlavního města Prahy) is one of the departments of the Prague City Hall. It collects, preserves, processes and makes available archival materials documenting the historical development of Prague since the Middle Ages up to the present. Together with the National Archives of the Czech Republic the Prague City Archives is one of the largest and most important archives in Bohemia.

== History ==
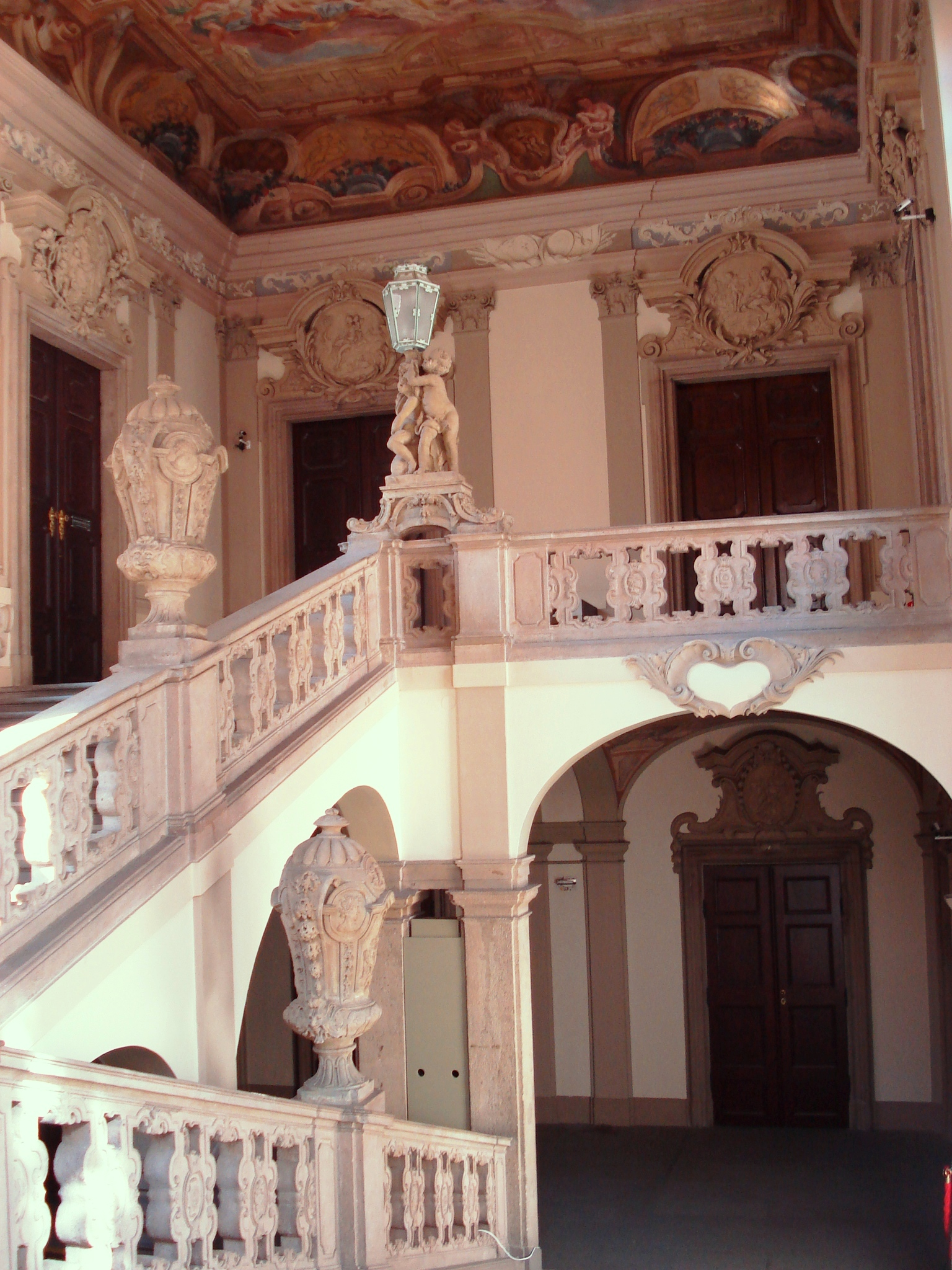
Staircase of Clam-Gallas Palace in the Old Town of Prague, which serves as the venue for cultural events of the Archives

The Prague City Archives was founded as an independent specialized institution in 1851. Since that time it was located on the ground floor of the Old Town Hall. During the fire of the Old Town Hall on 8 May 1945, a part of the archive was destroyed, but the majority of the historical documents were evacuated outside Prague. After the end of the war the archives were housed in the Clam-Gallas Palace in the Old Town of Prague. The palace was soon unable to accommodate the wealth of material, therefore the archives were housed in eight different buildings, some of them were located outside Prague. The new archive building was built in 1997 in the Prague district of Chodov. The Clam-Gallas Palace serves today as venue for cultural event and conferences organized by the Prague City Archives.

== Archival collections ==
The archive currently administers 19,000 meters in length of archive material and 3,000 meters of books, newspapers and magazines. The collection of manuscripts contains 8,427 official books relating to the four medieval Prague towns and several hundred literary, religious and scientific or academic manuscripts. It has a collection of over 200,000 parchments and paper documents. The archives has also a large library containing over 150,000 oriented chiefly towards the history of Prague and its present-day life.

The oldest document kept in the archives is the so-called Bohnice Authentica from 1158.
