= Václav Vacek =

Czech politician, attorney (1877–1960)

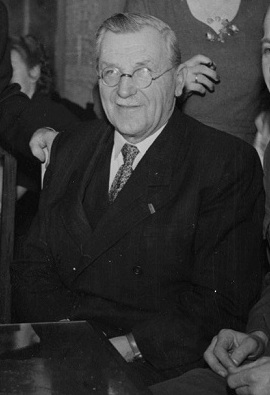

Mayor of Prague
- In office 2 May 1945 – August 1945
- Preceded by: Alois Říha
- Succeeded by: Petr Zenkl
- In office 1 July 1946 – December 1954
- Preceded by: Petr Zenkl
- Succeeded by: Adolf Svoboda

Personal details
- Born: 11 September 1877 Libochovice, Austria-Hungary (now Czech Republic)
- Died: 18 January 1960 (aged 82) Prague, Czechoslovakia (now Czech Republic)
- Party: ČSSD (before 1921); KSČ (1921–1960)
- Education: Charles University
- Profession: Writer, translator, journalist, lawyer

Václav Vacek (11 September 1877 – 18 January 1960) was a Czech communist politician. He served as a Senator in the National Assembly of Czechoslovakia and after the Prague Uprising as the Mayor of Prague. He was also a founding member of the Communist Party of Czechoslovakia after the schism in Czechoslovak Social Democratic Workers' Party in 1921.

== Legacy ==
The Prague Metro station Roztyly was named after him until the Revolution in 1989.
