= 2026 Prague municipal election =

- 9–10 October 2026

All 65 seats in the Assembly 33 seats needed for a majority

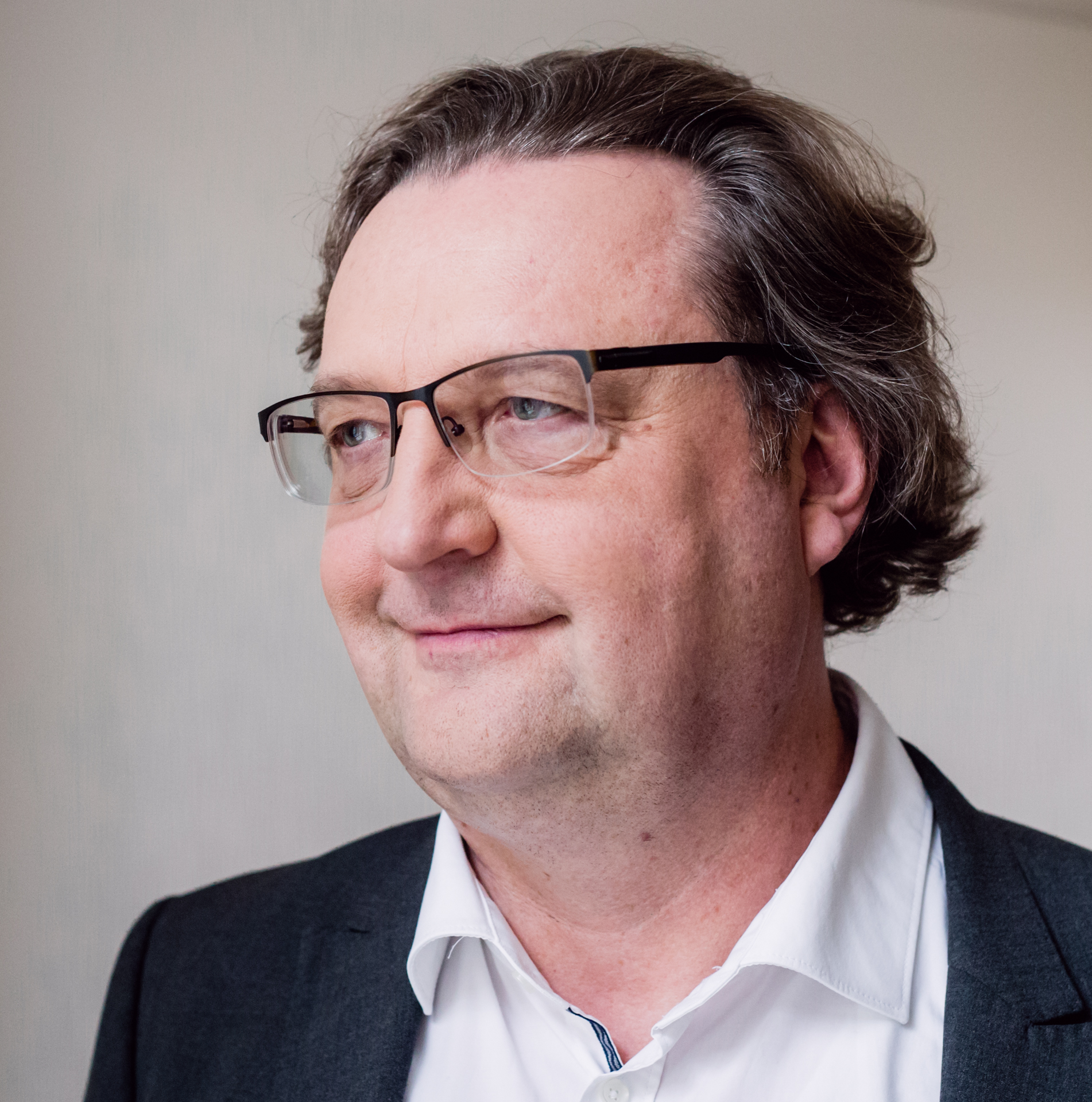
	First party	Second party	Third party
Leader	Tomáš Portlík	Jan Hušbauer	Tereza Nislerová
Party	ODS	ANO	Pirates
Alliance	Spolu for Prague
Last election	19 seats, 24.7%	14 seats, 19.3%	13 seats, 17.7
Seats won	17	11	7
Seat change	▼2 (Note: In the previous elections, the KDU-ČSL was also part of the coalition.)	▼3	▼5
Popular vote	5,422,670	3,530,200	2,305,338
Percentage	22.1%	14.4%	9.4%
	Fourth party	Fifth party
Leader	Adam Scheinherr	Petr Hlaváček
Party	Prague Together	STAN
Last election	11 seats, 14.7%	5 seats, 7.8%
Seats won	13	17
Seat change	▲2	▲12
Popular vote	4,403,312	5,696,945
Percentage	17.9%	23.2%
Mayor before election
Bohuslav Svoboda
ODS
Elected mayor
TBD

The 2026 Prague municipal election was held in October 2026 as part of the nationwide municipal elections to elect members of the Prague City Assembly. It was a victory for Mayors and Independents which received the highest number of votes and seats ahead of Spolu in second place. Prague Together finished third. New coalition was formed a month after election and it consists of STAN, Spolu and Prague Together. Petr Hlaváček became the new mayor.

== Pre-election composition of assembly ==
Party	Seats
ANO 2011	14
Czech Pirate Party	13
Prague Together	11
Civic Democratic Party	10
TOP 09	7
Mayors and Independents	5
KDU-ČSL	2
SPD	2
Independent	1
Source: Volby

== Results ==
Party	Votes	%	Seats
Mayors and Independents	5,696,945	23.17	17
Spolu for Prague	5,422,670	22.05	17
Prague Together	4,403,312	17.91	13
ANO 2011	3,530,200	14.36	11
Czech Pirate Party	2,305,338	9.38	7
SPD for Prague with support of Tricolour, PRO, Přísaha and independents	854,752	3.48	0
Motorists for Themselves	715,424	2.91	0
SEN 21 for Prague with Václav Láska	714,220	2.90	0
United Left for Prague (KSČM, ČSSD, KSČ)	221,191	0.90	0
WE ARE PRAGUE	161,440	0.66	0
PATRIOTS FOR PRAGUE	140,506	0.57	0
Svobodní	115,085	0.47	0
GEN with public support	101,085	0.41	0
RESIDENTS – REBELS for a Change in Prague	62,232	0.25	0
The Left	61,534	0.25	0
Our Prague SNK ED	19,568	0.08	0
A BETTER LIFE FOR PEOPLE	16,206	0.07	0
S.O.S. for Animal Rights — Democratic Party of Greens	16,047	0.07	0
Voluntia Libertarian Party	10,890	0.04	0
Right Bloc	9,721	0.04	0
YES, A BETTER CZECHIA WITH ALIENS	4,294	0.02	0
Czech Party of Asocials	3,474	0.01	0
BIG CROSS FOR A 1 CZK LÍTAČKA	1,631	0.01	0
Urza.cz	1,108	0.00	0
Total	24,588,873	100.00	65
Source: Volby
