= Karel Baxa =

Czech politician (1862–1938)

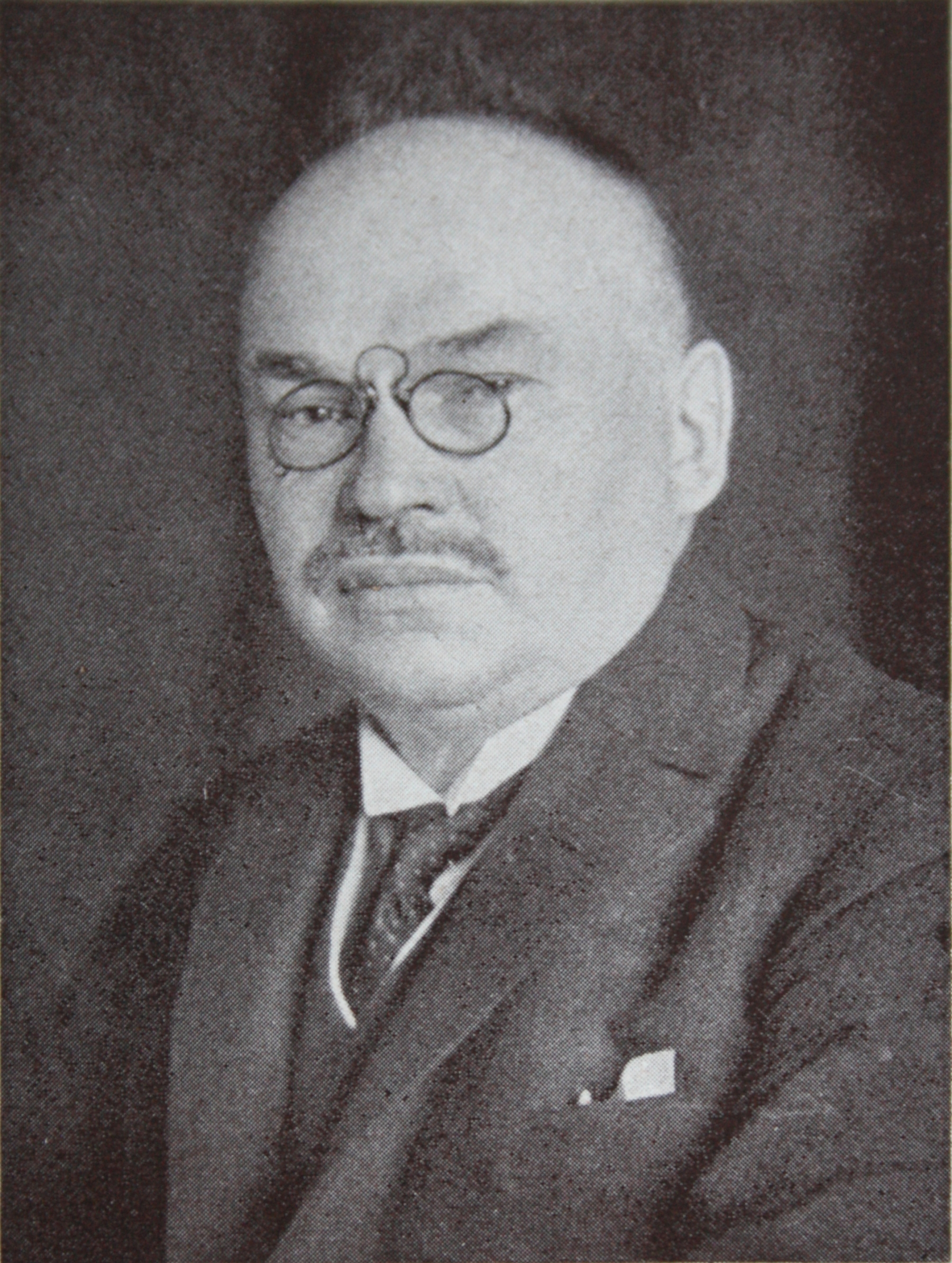

Mayor of Prague
- In office 15 June 1919 – 5 April 1937
- Preceded by: Přemysl Šámal
- Succeeded by: Petr Zenkl

President of Constitutional Court of Czechoslovakia
- In office 17 November 1921 – 5 January 1938
- Succeeded by: Jaroslav Krejčí

Personal details
- Born: 24 June 1863 Sedlčany, Austrian Empire
- Died: 5 January 1938 (aged 74) Prague, Czechoslovakia
- Party: Young Czech Party; Czech Constitutionalist Progressive Party; ČSNS (1919-1938)
- Spouse: Amelia Jurković
- Children: Three
- Education: Charles University
- Occupation: Politician, judge, lawyer

Karel Baxa (24 June 1863 – 5 January 1938) was a Czech politician in Austro-Hungarian Monarchy and then in Czechoslovakia. He is most known for his long term position as mayor of Prague (Primátor hlavního města Prahy).

== Advocacy ==
Baxa, nephew of journalist Karel Havlíček Borovský, was born in Sedlčany. He studied gymnasium, finishing in 1881, and continued to study law at the Charles University in Prague, finishing in 1888. Later, he worked at the courts in Tábor and Cheb and from 1891 he was an advocate in Prague. Baxa frequently defended Czech journalists during the state of emergency (1893) and was also the defendant of youth activists accused during the Omladina Trial (1893/94). He was the lawyer of the victim's family during the Hilsner Affair (1899), opposing the views of Tomáš Masaryk and spreading heavy antisemitic campaign.

== Political career ==
Baxa became a member of the radical movement (radikálně pokrokové hnutí), a section of the Young Czechs political party. In 1895 he vas elected to the local parliament of Bohemia, staying there until 1913. During 1901–1918 Baxa was also a member of the imperial parliament in Vienna (Wiener Reichsrat).

In 1899 he co-founded, together with Alois Rašín and several others, a new patriotic political party, (Státoprávně radikální strana) whose programme asked for the establishment of an independent Czech state. Baxa was leader of this party until 1908, when it split and Baxa, together with many members joined the Czech Constitutionalist Progressive Party (Česká strana státoprávně pokroková). In 1911 he joined the Czech National Social Party (later known under different names) and stayed there until his death in Prague in 1938.

== Mayor of Prague ==
After the creation of Czechoslovakia in 1918, Baxa was named mayor of Prague. In 1922 he assumed the role of mayor of Greater Prague (roughly today's city of Prague). He was reelected mayor three more times: in 1923, 1927 and 1932. In 1937 he left the position because of old age. During his service as mayor, the city witnessed major development of infrastructure and of social, cultural and medicine institutions. Baxa was portrayed as an initiator and supporter of this development.

Baxa had a distaste for ethnic Germans and on occasions proposed or supported limits on the use of German language in Prague.

Other important positions Baxa held were: from 1920 chairman of constitution court (předseda Ústavního soudu Československé republiky), from 1923 chairman of the board of directors of the Czech Bank (předseda správní rady České banky), during 1928–1937 member of state representation of Bohemia (člen českého zemského zastupitelstva), chairman of Czech ski club.

Political offices
Preceded by Přemysl Šámal	Mayor of Prague; 1919 – 1937	Succeeded by Petr Zenkl
