= Mariánské náměstí =

Square in Prague, Czech Republic

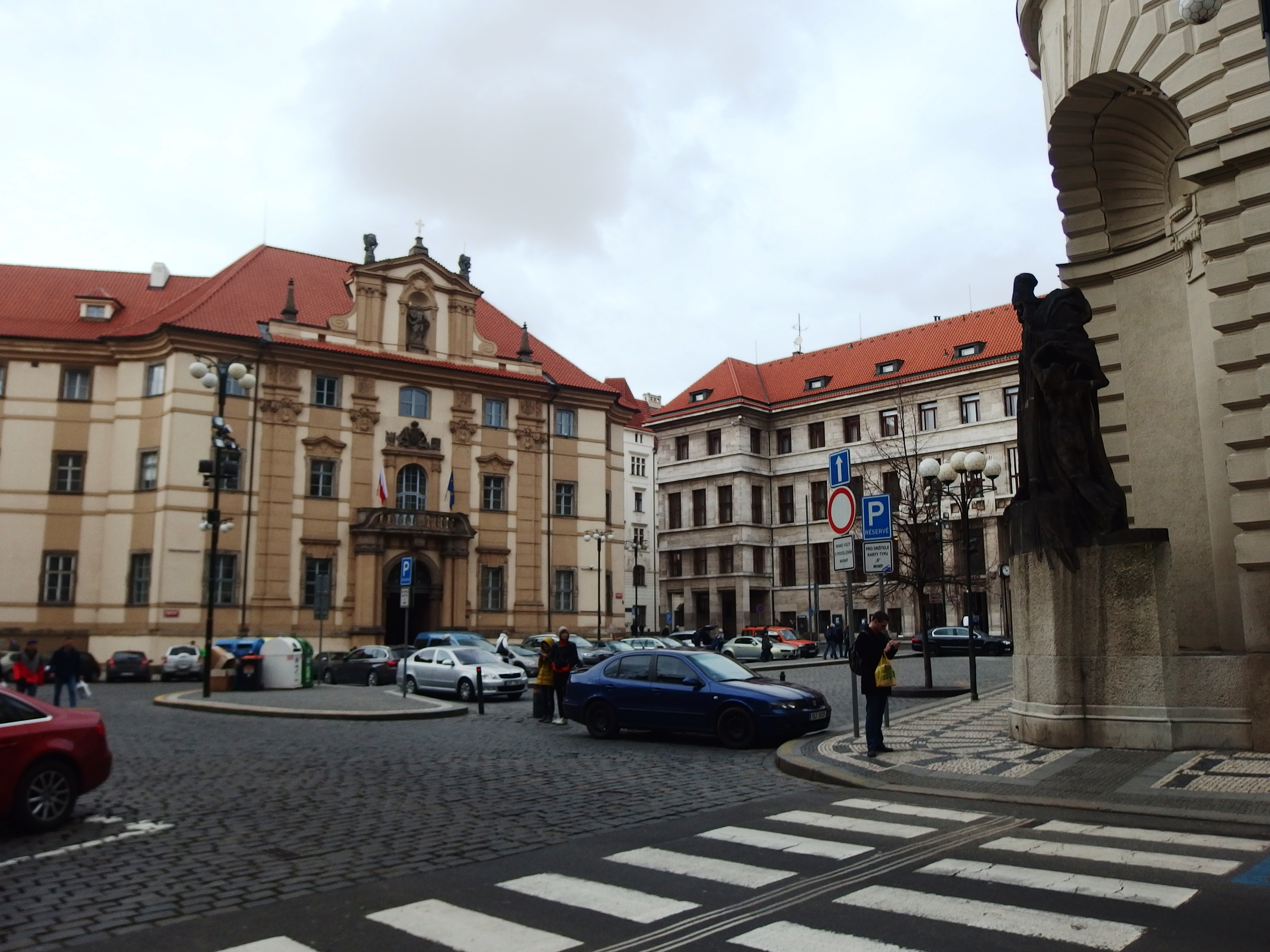
- Mariánské náměstí
- Interactive map of Mariánské náměstí
- Location: Prague
- Quarter: Old Town
- Coordinates: 50°05′13″N 14°25′03″E

Mariánské náměstí (translated as Virgin Mary Square) is a square in Old Town, Prague 1 in the Czech Republic. It is surrounded by significant public buildings such Clementinum with National library, New City Hall with Mayor of the City of Prague residence and Prague City Council, Clam-Gallas Palace and Trauttmansdorff Palace.

== History ==
The current name of the square is derived from extinct Church of the Virgin Mary Na louži, which was placed next to the current Clam-Gallas Palace.

In the 20th century, the square began to be used as a large car park. In 2019, Prague City Council decided that the square would be turned into a pedestrian zone. Prague Institute of Planning and Development decided that Czech architectonic studio Xtopic would create a study about how the square should look in the future. The rebuild is expected to be completed by 2024. From European Mobility Week in September 2019, parking on the square was forbidden. Cultural events will take place on the square instead.
