= Hilsner affair =

1899–1900 murder case in Austria-Hungary

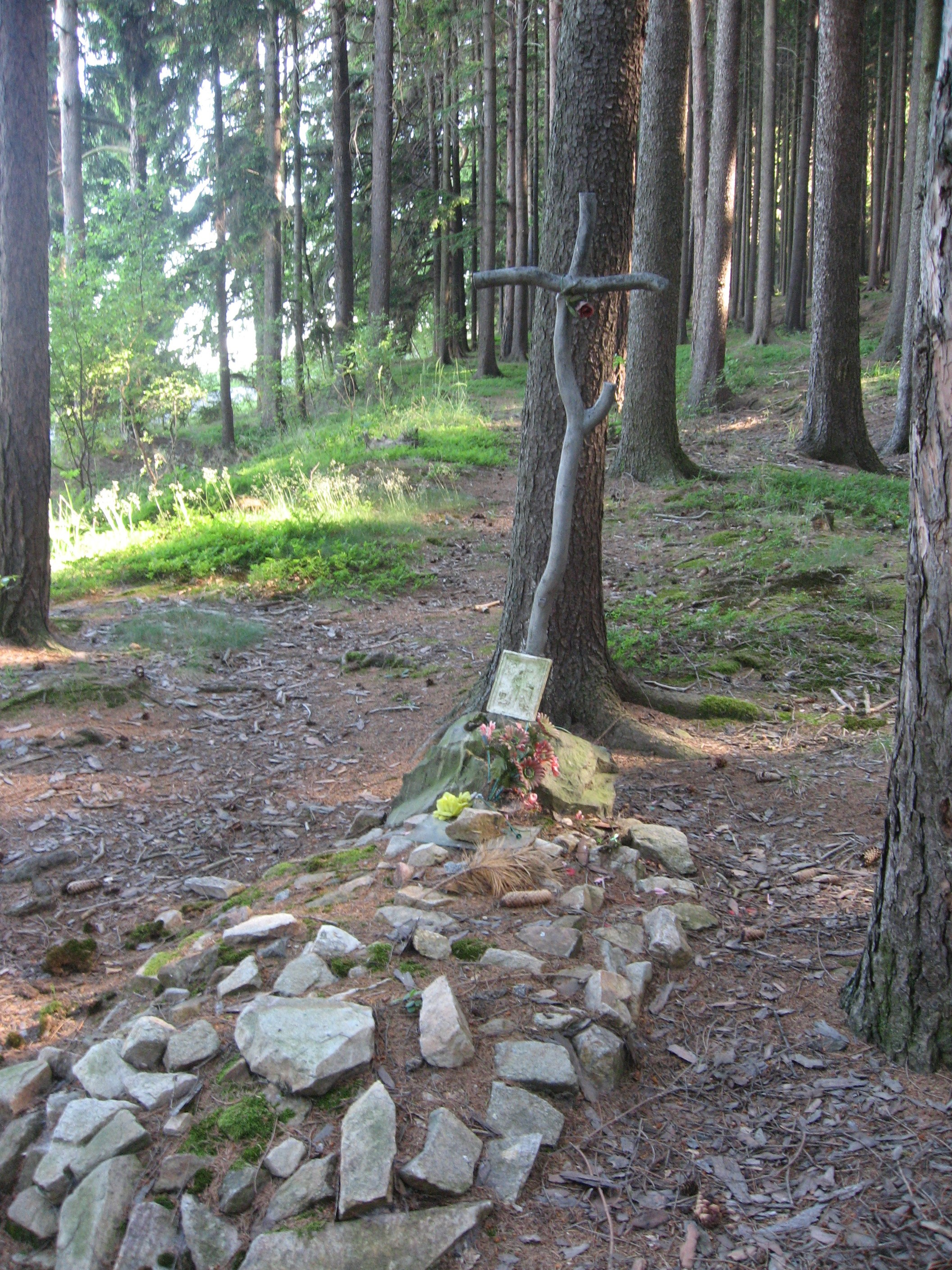
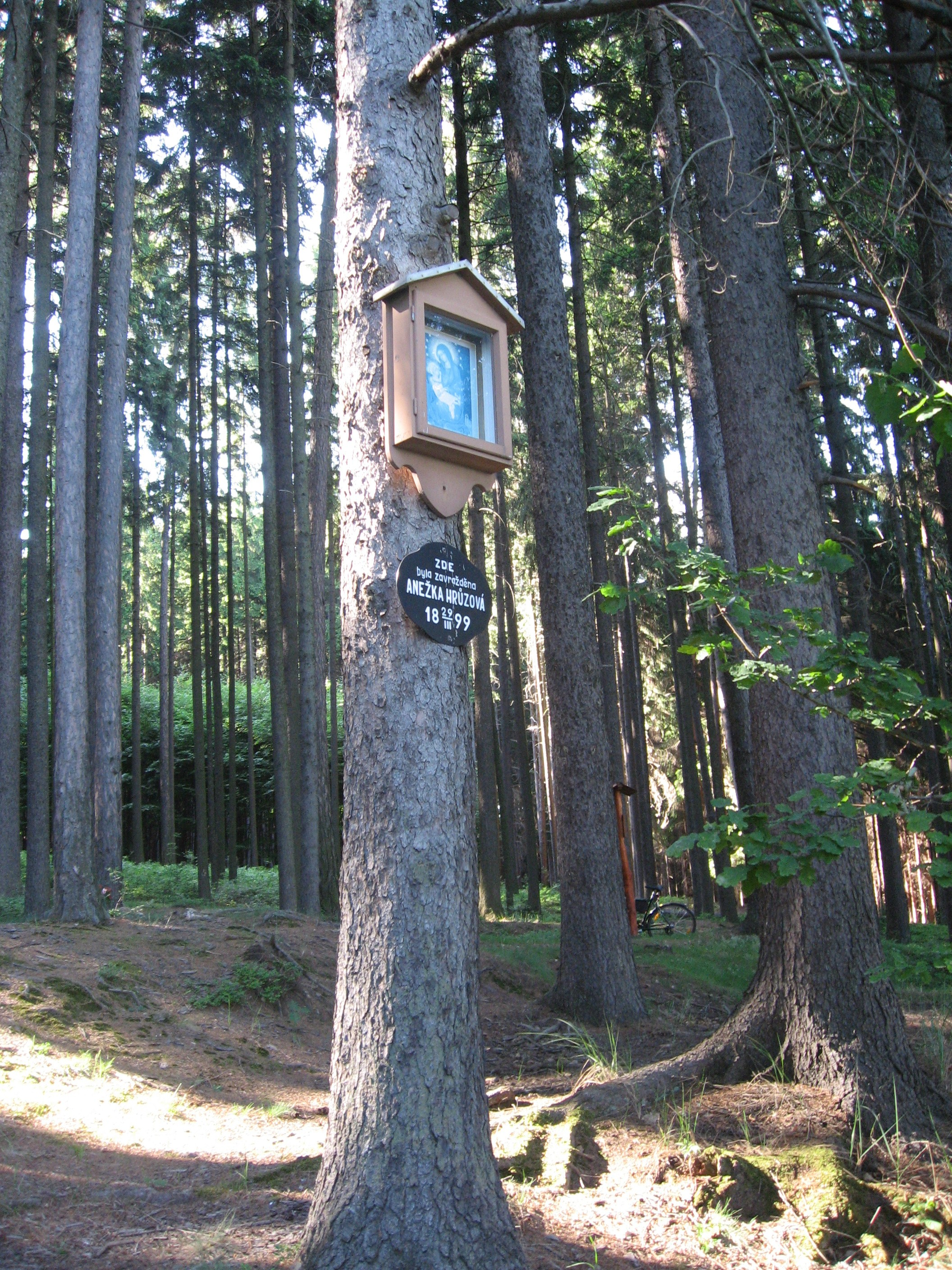
Symbolic grave of Anežka Hrůzová (top), place where Anežka Hrůzová was murdered (bottom)

The Hilsner affair (also known as the Hilsner trial, Hilsner case or Polná affair) was a series of antisemitic trials following an accusation against Leopold Hilsner, a Jewish inhabitant of the town of Polná in Bohemia, Austria-Hungary in 1899 and 1900. The affair, an instance of blood libel, achieved widespread media publicity at the time, and Tomáš Garrigue Masaryk, then professor at Charles University in Prague also got involved in the case to defend Leopold Hilsner. Hilsner spent 19 years in prison before being pardoned by the Emperor of Austria-Hungary.

== Background ==
=== Murder of Anežka Hrůzová ===
Anežka Hrůzová was a 19-year-old Czech Catholic girl, living in the village of Věžnička. She worked as a seamstress in Polná, 2 miles (3.2 km) away. On the afternoon of 29 March 1899, she left her place of employment as usual, but did not return to her home. Three days later (1 April) her body was found in a forest, her throat having been cut and her garments torn. Nearby was a pool of blood, some blood-stained stones, parts of her garments, and a rope with which she had been either strangled to death or dragged, after the murder, to the place where the body was found. Because of the little amount of blood found near the body, and the fact that Anežka Hrůzová's disappearance had taken place during the Jewish holiday of Passover, authorities and population began speculating this was a case of Jewish ritual murder (blood libel).

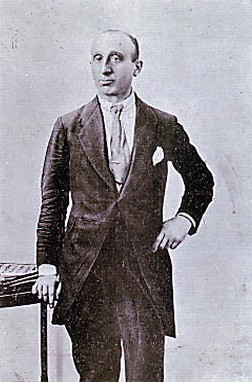
Leopold Hilsner

The suspicion of the sheriff was first turned against four vagrants who had been seen in the neighborhood of the forest on the afternoon of the day when the murder was supposed to have been committed. Among them was Leopold Hilsner, a 23-year-old Jew, a man of little intelligence, who had been a vagrant all his life. Suspicion against him was based on the fact that he had been frequently seen strolling in the forest where the body was found. A search of his house showed nothing suspicious. He claimed to have left the place on the afternoon of the murder long before it could have been committed; but he could not establish a perfect alibi. Hilsner was arrested, and tried at Kutná Hora on 12–16 September. He denied all knowledge of the crime. The only physical evidence against him was a pair of trousers on which some stains were found, which chemical experts said might have been blood, while the garment was wet as if an attempt had been made to wash it. One witness against him claimed to have seen Hilsner, at a distance of 2,000 feet (610 m), in company with two strange Jews, on the day on which the murder was supposed to have been committed and on the spot where the body was found. Another witness claimed to have seen him come from that place on the afternoon of 29 March and to have noticed that he was very much agitated. Both the prosecuting attorney, and the attorney for the Hrůza family, Karel Baxa, made clear suggestions of ritual murder. Testimony had proved that Hilsner was too weak to have committed the crime by himself. Still he was sentenced to death for participation in the murder, while his supposed accomplices were undiscovered and no attempt was made to bring them to justice.

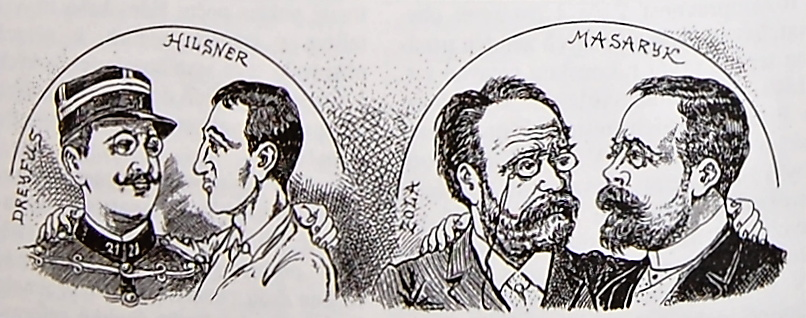
Caricature of the Hilsner affair, 1900

The prominent Czech nationalist scholar Tomáš Masaryk, professor of the Charles University in Prague, intervened on behalf of Hilsner; he filed an appeal to the supreme court, citing technical errors in the trial. The supreme court ordered a new trial, to be held at Písek in order to avoid intimidation of the jury by the mob, and the influence of political agitation. On 20 September 1899, a few days after the first trial, Hilsner was confronted by hostile fellow prisoners, who showed him some carpenters working in the courtyard of the jail and told him that they were constructing a gallows for him. They demanded the names of his accomplices, and said he could thus obtain a commutation of his sentence. Hilsner, terrified, named Joshua Erbmann and Solomon Wassermann as those who had assisted him. Being brought before the judge on 29 September, he declared that this statement was false. On 7 October, he reiterated the statement, but again recanted on 20 November. Fortunately for those he had accused, they were able to prove perfect alibis, one of them having been in jail on the day of the murder, while the other proved, from certificates of poorhouses in Moravia which he had visited as a beggar, that he could not possibly have been in Polná on that day.

=== Disappearance of Marie Klímová ===
Meanwhile, Hilsner was accused of another murder. Marie Klímová, a servant, had disappeared on 17 July 1898. A female body was found on 27 October following in the same forest as the body of Anežka Hrůzová. This body had, with great probability, been identified as the missing girl. However, decomposition was so advanced that it could not even be established whether the girl had been murdered. Hilsner, charged with this crime also, was tried for both murders in Písek (25 October-14 November 1900). The witnesses at this trial became more definite in their statements. Those that at the first trial had spoken of a knife which they had seen in Hilsner's possession, now asserted distinctly that it was such a knife as was used in ritual slaughtering. The strange Jews who were supposedly seen in company with Hilsner were more and more particularly described. When witnesses were shown that the testimony given by them at the second trial differed from that given at the first trial, they said either that they had been intimidated by the judge or that their statements had not been correctly recorded.

=== Sentence, pardon and aftermath ===
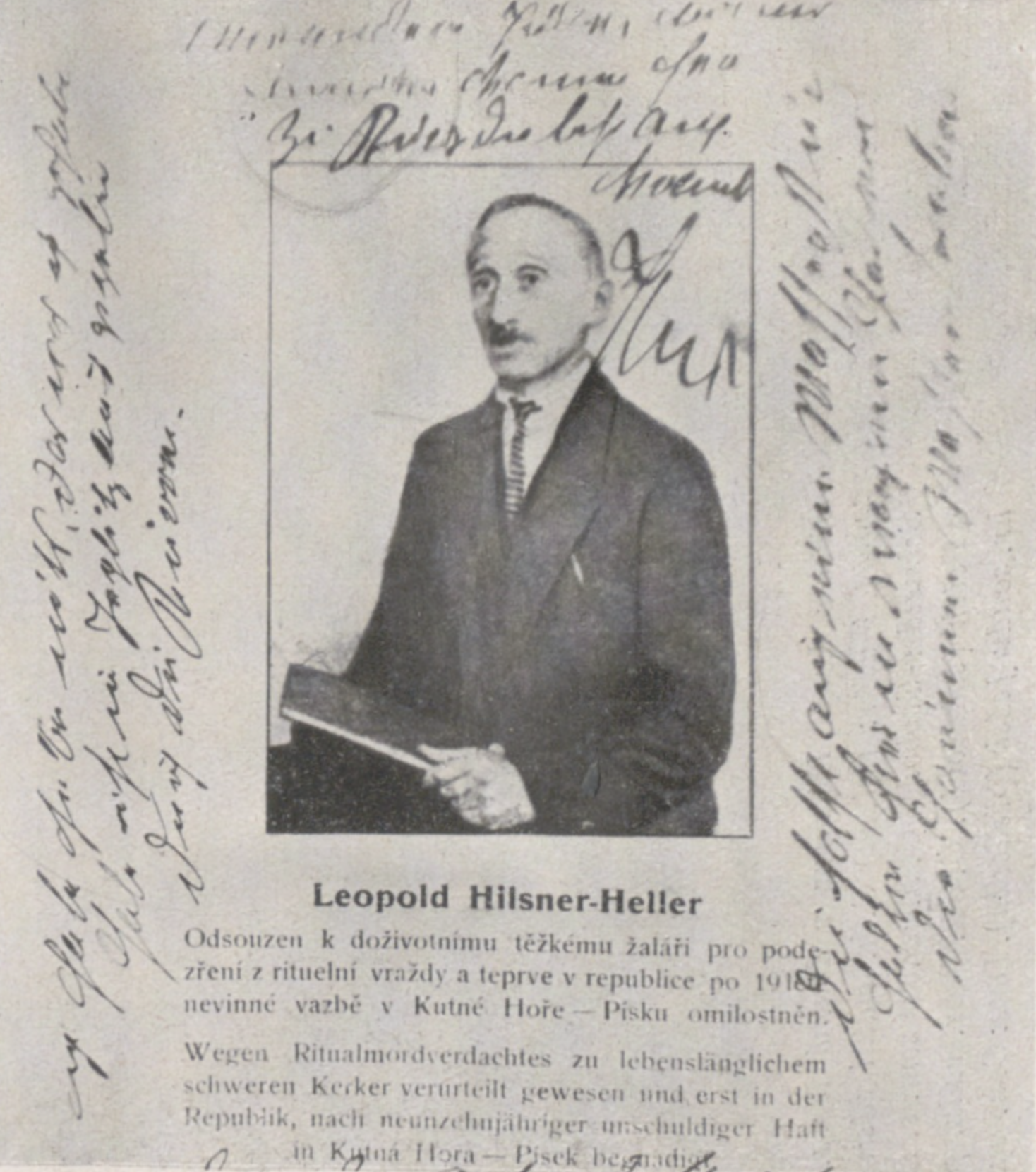
Hilsner after his release in 1918

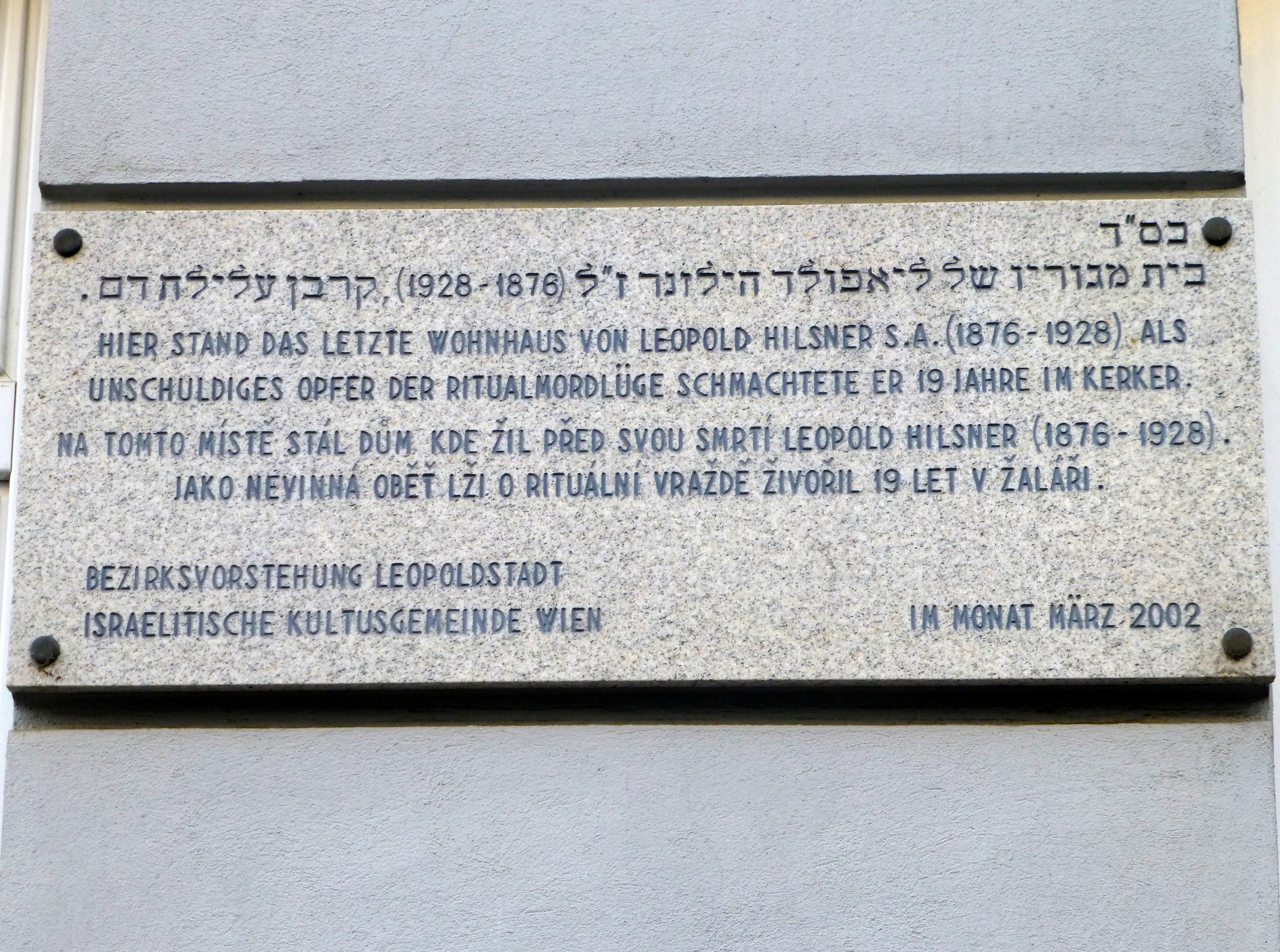
Plaque commemorating Hilsner in Vienna

Hilsner was found guilty of having murdered both Anežka Hrůzová and Marie Klímová and sentenced to death on 14 November 1900. The sentence was commuted by Emperor Franz Josef to life imprisonment on 11 June 1901 but requests to renew the trial were turned down. Shortly before the end of World War I (24 March 1918), Hilsner was pardoned by Emperor Karl. He spent the rest of his life in Velké Meziříčí, Prague, and Vienna; he died on 9 January 1928 at the age of 52 in Vienna. His conviction was never annulled, and no one else was ever charged with the murders. Although the case was never solved, Hilsner's innocence concerning the anachronistic charge of ritual murder is recognized. A tombstone unveiled over his grave reads: 'As the innocent victim of lies of ritual murder, he languished in prison for 19 years'. A plaque on his last place of residence also reads: 'Here stood the house where Leopold Hilsner (1876–1928) lived before his death. As the innocent victim of lies about ritual murder, he wasted 19 years in prison.'

== See also ==
- Dreyfus affair
- Tiszaeszlár affair
- Beilis affair
- History of antisemitism
