= Operation Dozimetr =

Operation Dozimetr was a police operation in June 2022 related to investigation of corruption at Prague City Hall linked primarily to Prague Public Transit Company (DPP). After more than two years of monitoring, the Police of the Czech Republic carried out a mass raid on the Prague City Hall, at the headquarters of the Transport Enterprises of the Capital City of Prague and at dozens of other places. Eleven of the thirteen defendants were arrested including the then Deputy Mayor of Prague Petr Hlubuček a member of Mayors and Independents or the influential Zlín businessman Michal Redl who is the alleged head of the group. The Group was accused, for example, for influencing the public contracts of the Prague Public Transit Company (DPP), bribery and efforts to divest assets from DPP and other institutions.

== Operation Dozimetr ==
On 15 June 2022 The National Centre for Combating Organised Crime launched the Dosimetr operation. It was a mass raid on the City of Prague, the Prague Public Transit Company (DPP) and other places. Police charged thirteen people.

The police monitored the group for over two years. They used telephone and conspiracy flats to monitor. The group knew about the interest of the police at least since September 2020, when the media wrote about the filed criminal report. According to criminal investigators, therefore, the accused regularly inspected their equipment for wiretapping and, for example, used encrypted communication. They also hired a security agency to detect wiretaps. And thanks to contacts with the police, they also discovered one car that was watching them. In total, the police prosecuted thirteen people, three of whom were abroad at the time of the raid.

According to the police, the leader of the group was Zlín businessman Michal Redl, who had previously been investigated for his connection to Radovan Krejčíř. However, he did not go to court because the doctors confirmed his partial incapacity. According to records, the group operated in such a way that Petr Hlubuček exercised his political influence over the City of Prague and the DPP Supervisory Board and, together with senior executives, influenced DPP's finances and public procurement for the benefit of connected entrepreneurs. Their other goals were the contracts of the General Health Insurance Company or the Regional Administration and Road Maintenance of the Central Bohemian Region. Deputy Mayor Adam Scheinherr (Prague Together) said that in the past, he filed as a chairman of the DPP Supervisory Board a criminal complaint on suspicion of attempted corruption.

The police started investigation of another branch of the Dosimetr operation - contracts in General Health Insurance Company (VZP). In April 2023 the police charged five people, one of them is former Civic Democratic Party MP Marek Šnajdr. He should have received a bribe 200,000 crowns from Pavel Dovhomilja to influence one public contract.

=== Arrested ===
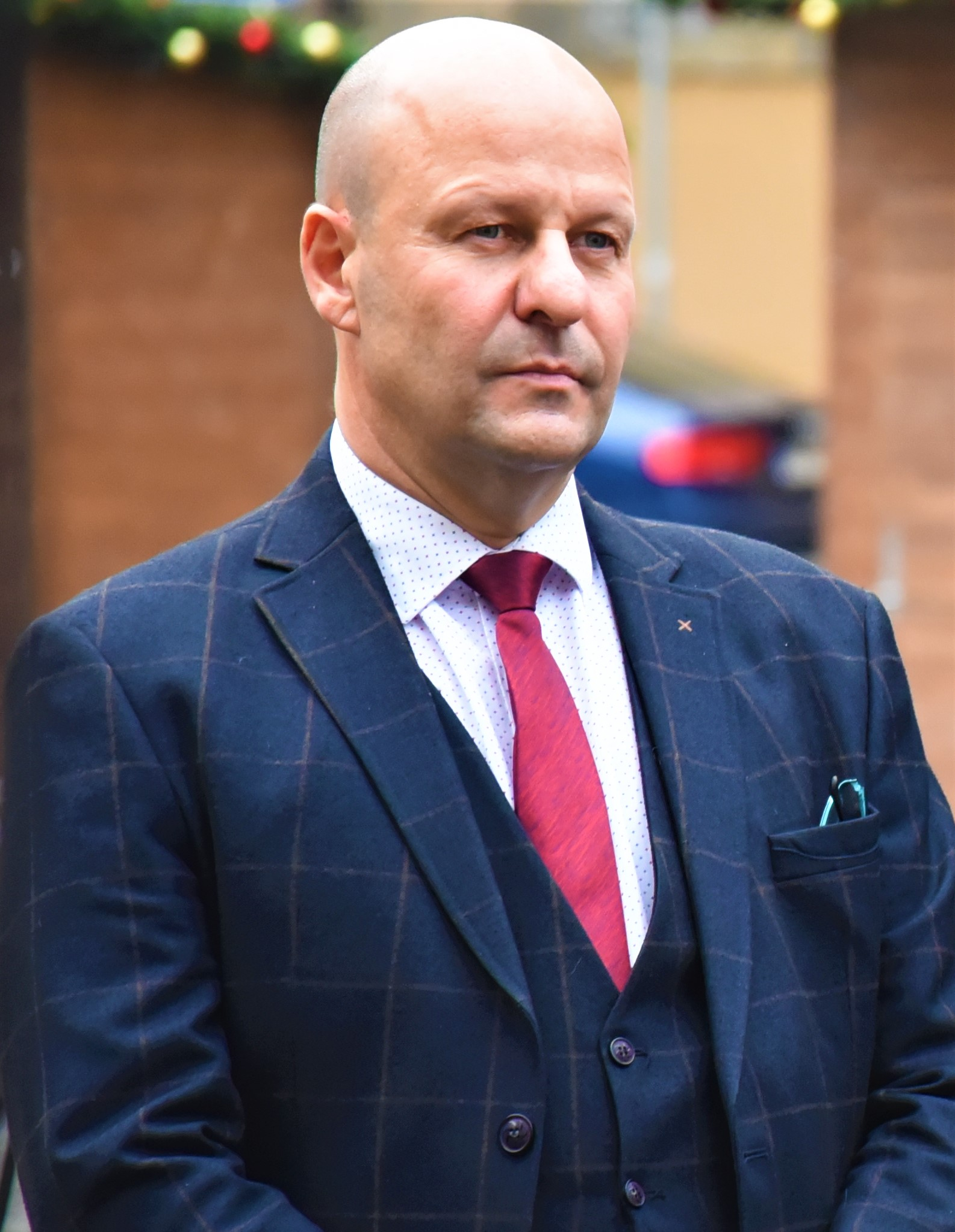
Petr Hlubuček (STAN)

- Petr Hlubuček (48 years old) — Deputy Mayor of Prague, member of DPP Supervisory Board, Mayor of Praha-Lysolaje and member of STAN.
- Michal Redl (48 years old) — Zlín businessman and lobbyist linked to STAN.
- Pavel Kos (49 years old) — businessman, close friend of Michal Redl.
- Matej Augustín (47 years old) — then economic deputy and member of the DPP board of directors, who was pushed into office by Hlubuček despite the disagreement of coalition partners.
- Pavel Dovhomilja (41 years old) — businessman in IT.
- Zakaría Nemrah (32 years old) — businessman and former member of SPOZ.
- Luděk Šteffel (49 years old) — Head of the DPP information technology unit, who was appointed by Augustín.
- Dalibor Kučera (35 years old) — Head of the DPP Legal Department.
- Martin Vejsada (51 years old) — Head of the Department of Technical Administration of DPP facilities.
- Ivo Pitrman (51 years old) — personal driver Michal Redl, who protected the members of the group from being exposed by police officers.
- Maroš Jančovič (44 years old) — Slovak businessman in IT.
- Petr Adam (60 years old) — businessman, representative of Komo-Com.
- Jindřich Špringl (59 years old) — businessman, CEO of the security and telecommunications company Analogia.

=== Accused, General Health Insurance Company (VZP) branch ===
- Marek Šnajdr — former MP ODS.
- Pavel Dovhomilja — businessman in IT.
- Tomáš Knížek — former deputy director of VZP
- Josef Listík — former director of technical support VZP
- Václav Novák — CEO of the company Total Service.

== Hlubuček affair ==
Shortly after his arrest, Petr Hlubuček was removed from all positions at the Prague City Hall, in the DPP and in the STAN party. For the time being, however, he remains mayor of the Prague-Lysolaje district. Immediately after his arrest, Petr Hlubuček began to dispose of his property. For example, he transferred his villa and the surrounding land in Prague's Lysolaje to his partner Jiří Karvánek (STAN).

The police file also showed the connection between the Minister of Education Petr Gazdík (STAN) and Michal Redl, with whom he repeatedly called, arranged secret meetings and was on holiday with him. On 19 June 2022 Petr Gazdík stated that although he felt innocent, he would resign as Minister of Education and vice-chairman of the STAN movement at the end of the month.

The STAN party subsequently began to examine its financial donations and found a connection with Redl at 300,000 crowns, which declared that the donors would return. Due to the case (and the death of Deputy leader Věslav Michalik), the staffing of the STAN leadership was significantly disrupted. Leader Vít Rakušan therefore moved the holding of the regular assembly of the movement from the autumn to the summer of 2022.
