= Petr Zenkl =

Czech politician and university educator (1884–1975)

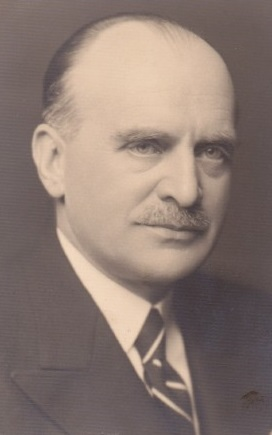

Mayor of Prague
- In office 6 April 1937 – 24 February 1939
- Preceded by: Karel Baxa
- Succeeded by: Otakar Klapka
- In office 27 August 1945 – 1 July 1946
- Preceded by: Václav Vacek
- Succeeded by: Václav Vacek

Personal details
- Born: 13 June 1884 Tábor, Bohemia, Austria-Hungary
- Died: 2 November 1975 (aged 91) Raleigh, North Carolina, U.S.
- Resting place: Vyšehrad Cemetery
- Party: Czechoslovak National Social Party
- Spouse: Pavla
- Education: Charles University
- Occupation: Politician, university professor

Petr Zenkl (13 June 1884 – 2 November 1975) was a Czech politician, government minister, mayor of Prague, chairman of the Czechoslovak National Social Party (1945–1948), deputy prime minister of Czechoslovakia (1946–1948) and the chairman of the exile Council of Free Czechoslovakia (1949–1974).

== Biography ==
Petr Zenkl was born as the eighth son of a small businessman, originally a tailor, in the South Bohemian town of Tábor. All of the children helped their father in his business and strived to earn money. His father was a Czech patriot, and consequently his children joined the Sokol movement. Zenkl studied at the gymnasium (grammar school) in Tábor and later graduated from the Philosophy Faculty of Charles University in Prague and in 1907 gained a doctorate. During his studies in Tábor he met a daughter of his history teacher, 16-year-old Pavla, and married her six years later in 1909.

From 1911 Zenkl was active in local politics in Prague, more precisely in Karlín, which was until 1921 an independent town before its incorporation to Prague. In 1911 he became a member of the Karlín town council, and in 1919 became a mayor of Karlín. He lost his position when Karlín was incorporated into Prague in 1921–1922. As a member of the Prague city council, Zenkl was installed in 1937 to the position of Prague's mayor, replacing his successful predecessor, dr. Karel Baxa.

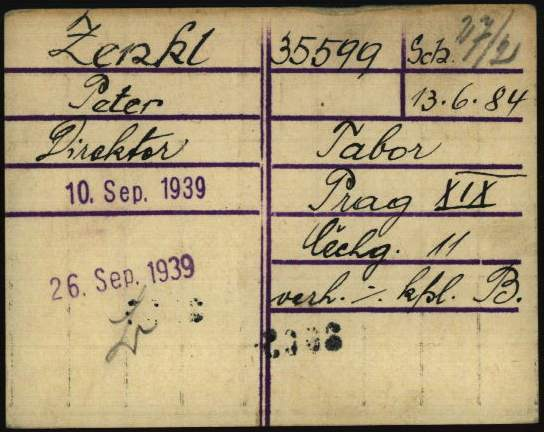
Registration card of Petr Zenkl as a prisoner at Dachau Nazi Concentration Camp

Shortly after the Nazi German occupation of Prague (March 1939) Zenkl was arrested and jailed in the Pankrác Prison. From there he was transported to the Dachau concentration camp and, after three weeks, to the Buchenwald concentration camp, where he was liberated together with other inmates by the army of U.S. General George S. Patton. Zenkl is mentioned in Edward R Murrow's report of Buchenwald on 11 April 1945, when a man turned to him in a barracks and said "You remember me, I am Petr Zenkl, onetime mayor of Prague". The two had indeed met before, but given such harsh treatment as Zenkl had endured, he was unrecognizable. With American military help, he was able to fly through Frankfurt am Main and Paris to London, where he learned that his place as Mayor of Prague had been taken by the communist Václav Vacek. He was also informed that he had been elected chairman of his Czechoslovak National Social Party by the Revolutionary Committee of the party.

He took over his position as mayor in August 1945, replacing Vacek, and fulfilled his duties until May 1946, when elections took place and Václav Vacek returned to office. After the elections, as the chairman of the second strongest party (after the Communist Party of Czechoslovakia) he became the Deputy Prime Minister of the Czechoslovak government in May 1946. In September 1947 Zenkl, together with minister Jan Masaryk and fellow National Socialist minister of justice Prokop Drtina, were victims of communist-orchestrated intimidation, when they received boxes containing explosives. In February 1948 Zenkl resigned, together with other non-communist government ministers, in order to convince the communist Minister of Interior Václav Nosek to cancel unconstitutional measures, which Nosek had instituted during his ministry.

After the communist coup d'état of 1948 Zenkl was under constant surveillance by the communist State Security apparatus. He managed, however, to escape with his wife to the West in August 1948. In subsequent years he became the head of the Czechoslovak political exile movement. From 1949 to1974 he was a chairman of the exile Council of Free Czechoslovakia, based in Washington, D.C. After the fall of communism in 1989, his remains were transferred from the United States to the Vyšehrad Cemetery in Prague. In October 1991 he was awarded, in memoriam, the Order of Tomáš Garrigue Masaryk, II class, by President Václav Havel.

== Works ==
- T. G. Masaryk and the Idea of European and World Federation (1955)
- Masarykova Československá republika (Masaryk's Czechoslovak Republic) (1955)
- T. G. Masaryk and the Idea of European and World Federation (1955)
- Communist Seizure of Power and the Press 1945-48 (1962)
- A history of the Czechoslovak Republic, 1918-1948 (1973)
- Mozaika vzpomínek (Mosaic of Memories) (1997)

== Footnotes ==
Political offices
Preceded by Karel Baxa	Mayor of Prague; 1937–1939	Succeeded by Otakar Klapka
Preceded by Václav Vacek	Mayor of Prague; 1945–1946	Succeeded by Václav Vacek
