= New City Hall (Prague) =

Central administrative building of Prague, Czechia

- Nová radnice
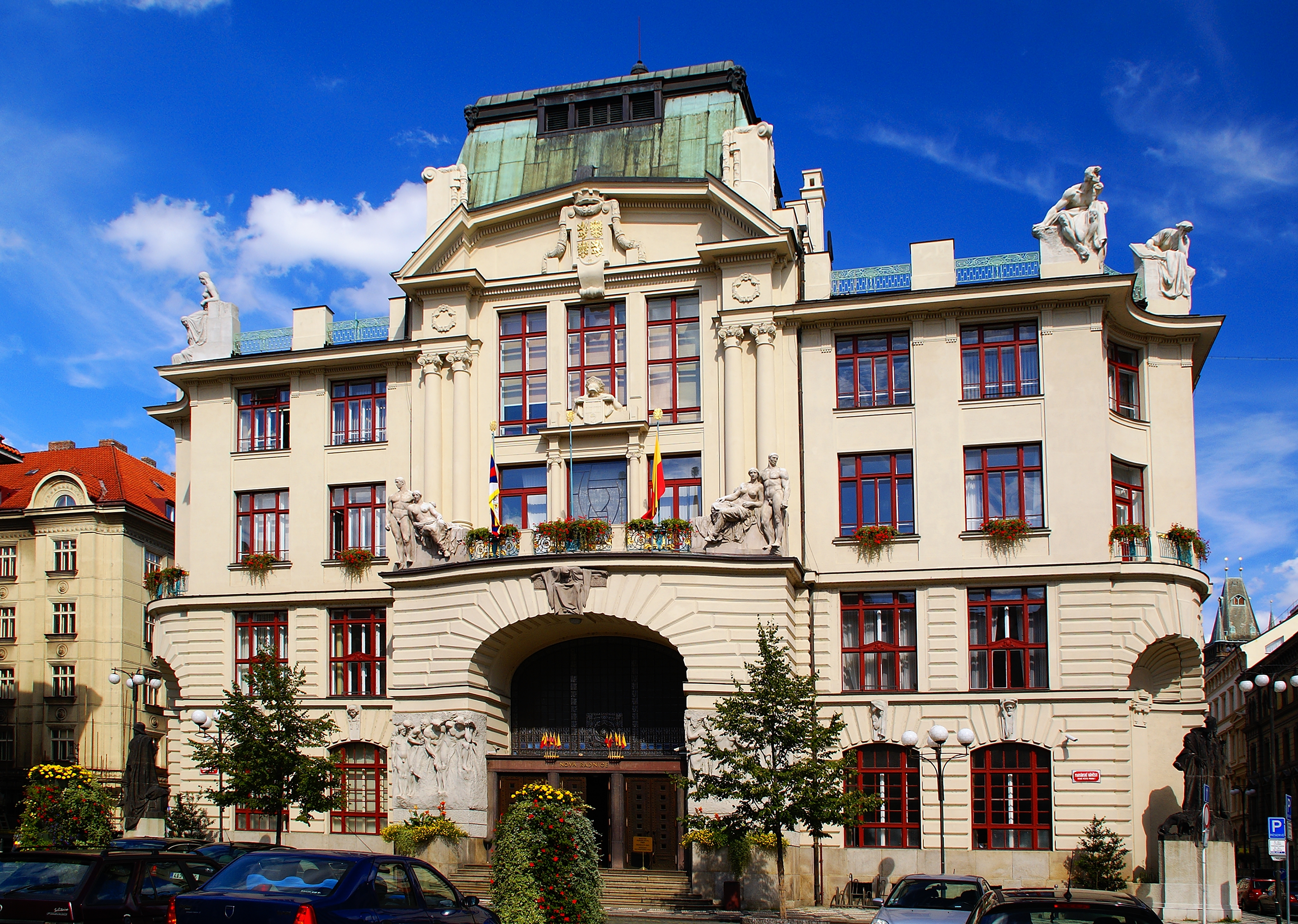
- New City Hall
- Interactive map of the New City Hall area

General information
- Architectural style: Art Nouveau
- Location: Mariánské náměstí, Mariánské náměstí 2/2, Prague 1, Czech Republic
- Coordinates: 50.0782°N 14.4211°E
- Construction started: 1908
- Completed: 1911

Design and construction
- Architect: Osvald Polívka

Prague New City Hall (Czech: Nová radnice), the central administrative building of Prague (not to be confused with the New Town Hall/Novoměstská radnice, once the town hall of Prague's New Town and now the building of the city district Prague 2), is located on the east side of Mariánské náměstí (Virgin Mary Square) in the centre of the Old Town, Prague 1, across from the Clementinum building complex.

Since 1945 it has been the seat of Prague City Hall, Prague City Council, Prague City Assembly and the Mayor of Prague. The building contains offices, meeting halls and formal residences for the mayor and other city officials.

== History ==
The hall stands on Virgin Mary Square. This was the site of a Romanesque church until 1798. In 1904 the city council announced a competition to design a new Radnice (city hall). The architect Osvald Polívka was announced as the winner in 1906. The new Radnice was constructed from 1908 to 1911 based on Polívka's Art Nouveau plans. There were a few changes during the construction when it was realised that the floor area needed to be increased and the Emperor-King also had a view on the design.

== Description ==
Schematic of a Paternoster lift

The building is decorated by sculptures and reliefs by Stanislav Sucharda, Josef Mařatka and Ladislav Šaloun. Šaloun's sculptures are on the corners of the building. He is the same local sculptor who created the city's iconic Jan Hus Memorial.

The building, which was intended as a tax and financial office, was equipped with paternoster lifts, which were very modern at the time. There were two lifts designed by John Prokopec which included safety features that allowed the lifts to operate at higher speeds with each of the twelve carriages having room for two people. The core of the building was a hall on the first floor with chandeliers and a transparent roof by Franta Anýž. Since the 1970s there has been only one paternoster lift, which dates from that decade. This lift still covers the four floors but it now has thirteen carriages.

On the wall of the main staircase leading to the assembly hall, there is a memorial plaque for Milada Horáková by sculptor Jaroslava Lukešová. Horáková was a politician in the city. She had opposed both the Nazis and the communists. The latter executed her after a show trial in 1952.

The New City Hall is a residency for the local government. Apart from the mayor of the City of Prague, the members of Prague City Council and some of the departments also have their meetings there.

== Images ==
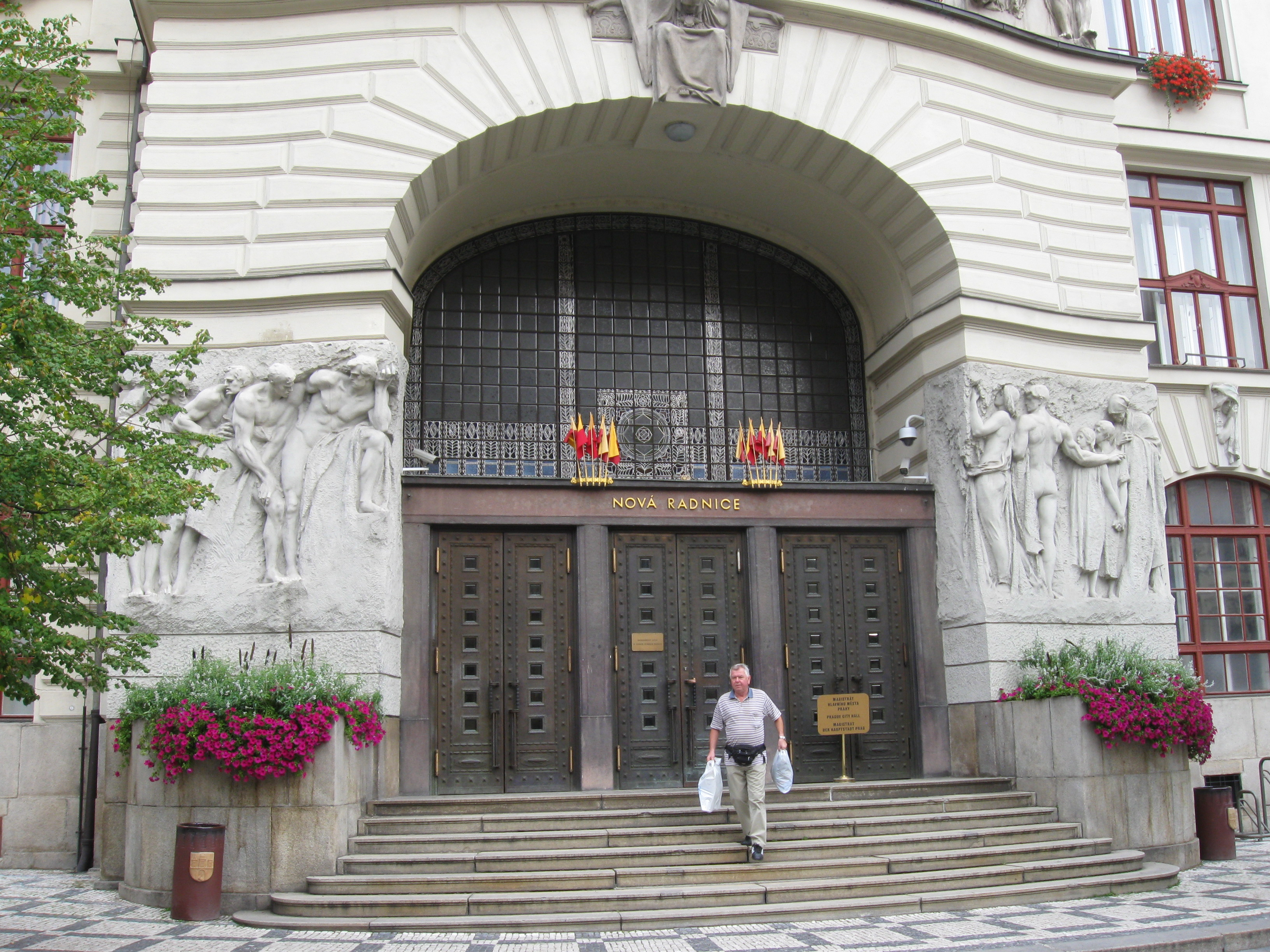
Threshold with flanking sculptural groups by Stanislav Sucharda

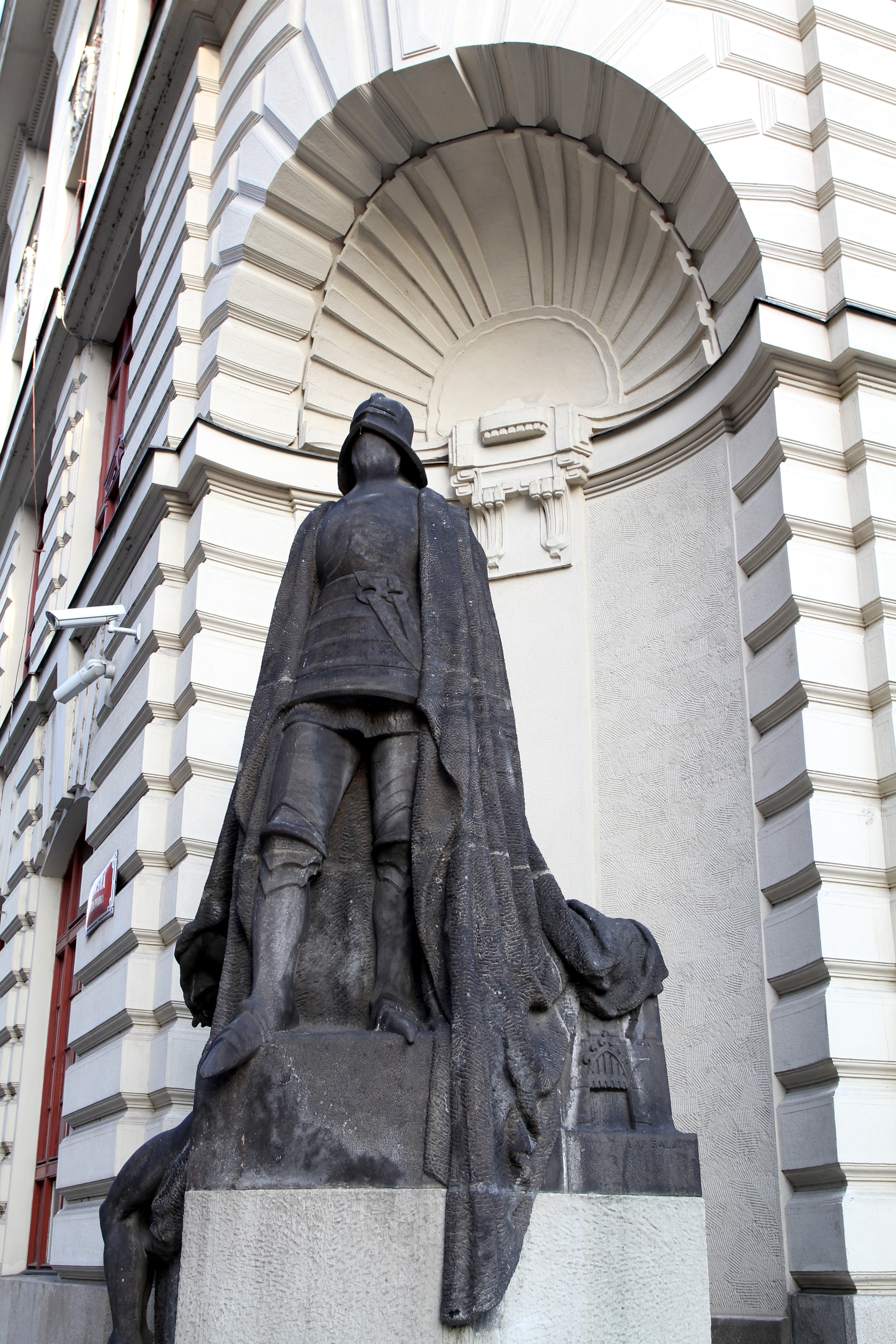
The Iron Knight, by sculptor Ladislav Šaloun

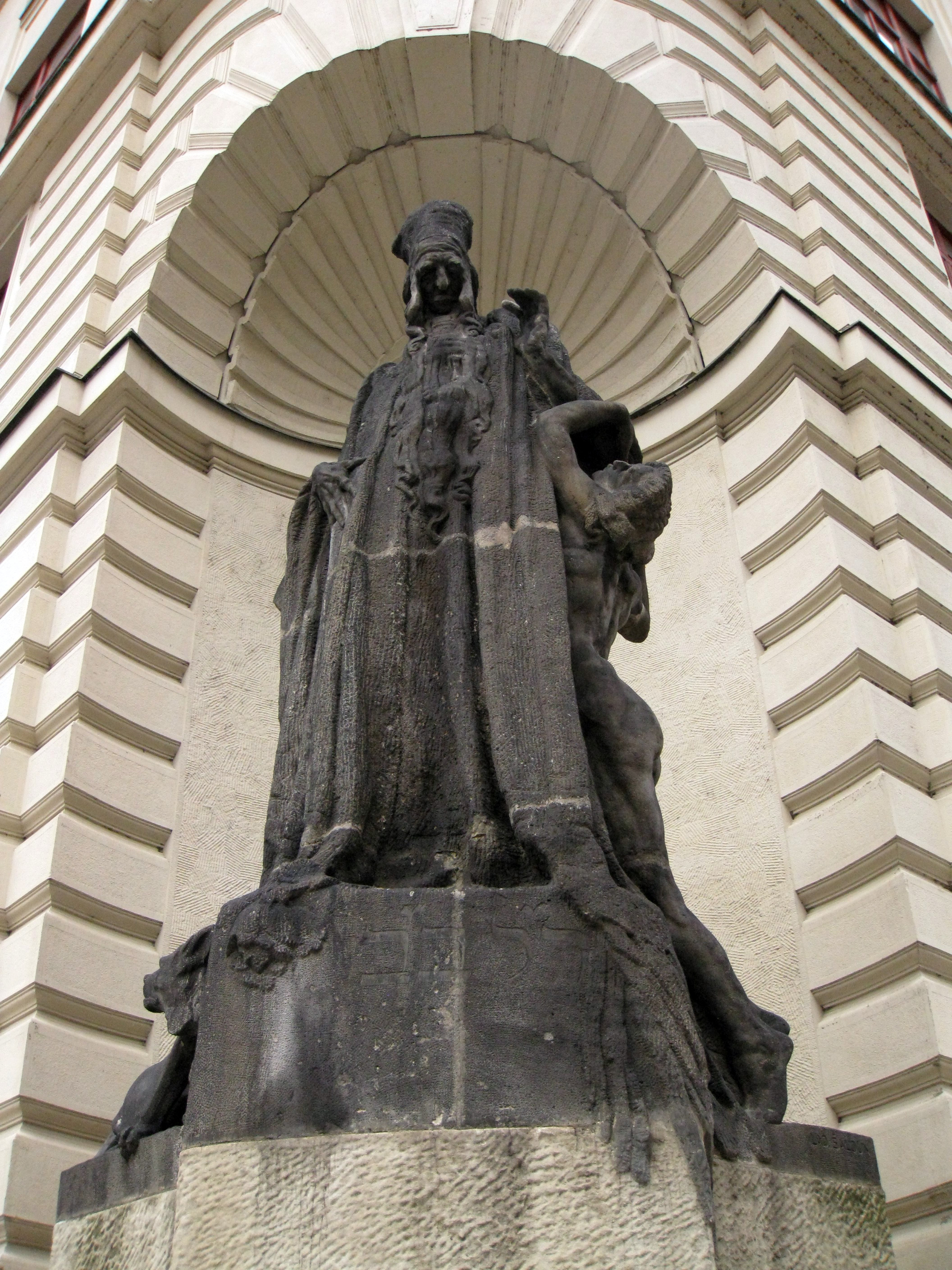
Rabbi Lowe, also by sculptor Ladislav Šaloun

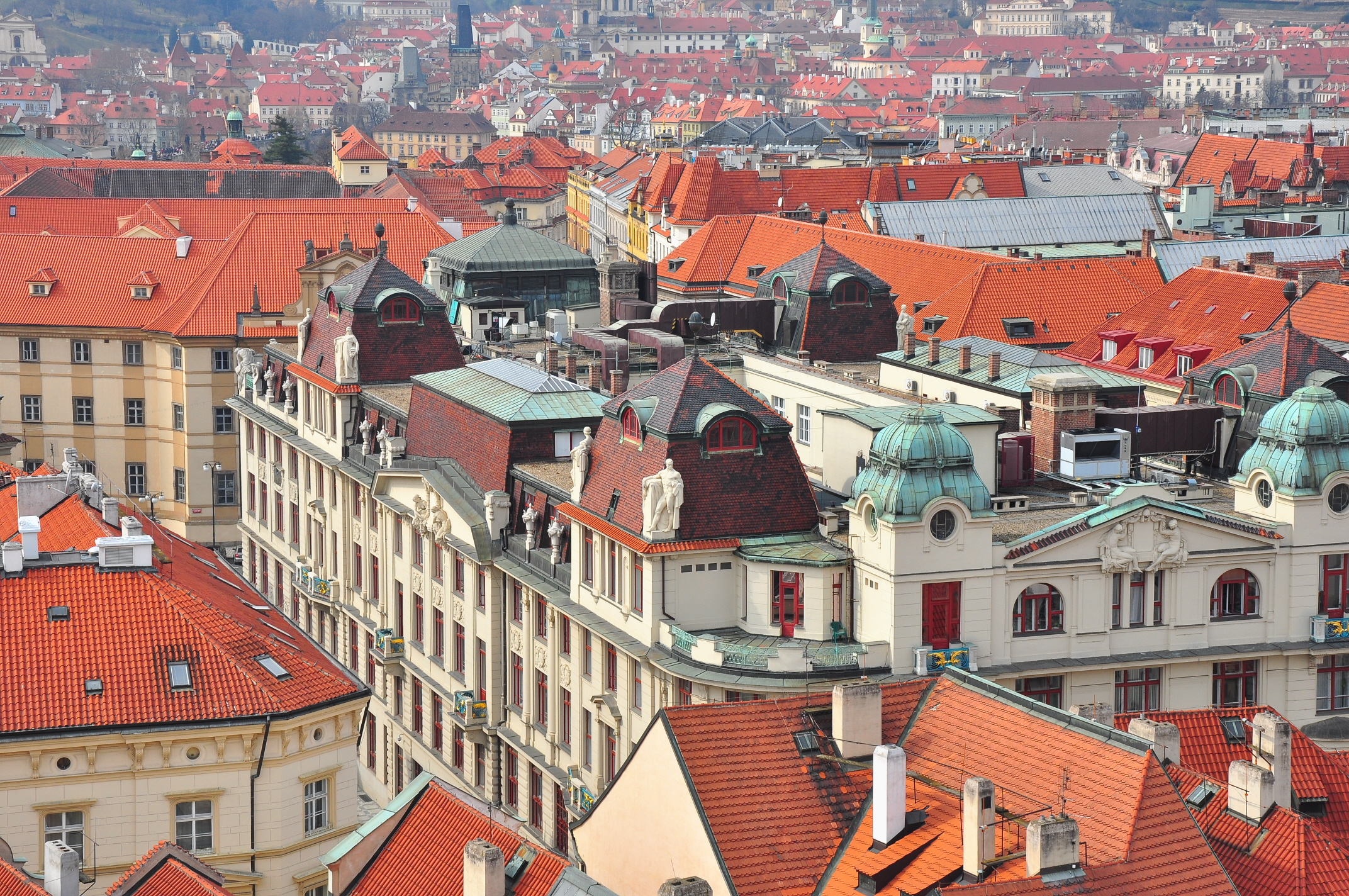

== See also ==
- Mayor of the City of Prague
- Prague City Hall
- Prague City Council
- Prague City Assembly

== Literature ==
- Umělecké památky Prahy (Nové Město), Růžena Baťková, Academia 1998, Architektonický obzor (roč. 11, rok 1912)
- Jaroslava Staňková, Jiří Štursa, Svatopluk Voděra: Pražská architektura : významné stavby jedenácti století, Praha, 1991, ISBN 80-900209-6-8
