= Prague City Assembly =

Legislative body of the City of Prague

Prague City Assembly Zastupitelstvo hlavního města Prahy

Leadership
- Mayor: Petr Hlaváček, STAN since 19 November 2026
- First Deputy Mayor: Tomáš Portlík, Spolu/ODS
- Deputy Mayor: Adam Scheinherr, Prague Together
- Deputy Mayor: Antonín Klecanda, STAN
- Deputy Mayor: Hana Novotná, STAN
- Deputy Mayor: Michal Hroza, Spolu/TOP 09

Structure
- Seats: 65
- Political groups: Seats won in the 2026 election (65): STAN (17); Spolu for Prague (17); Prague Together (13); ANO 2011 (11); Pirates (7)
- Length of term: 4 years

Elections
- Last election: 9–10 October 2026
- Next election: 2030

Meeting place
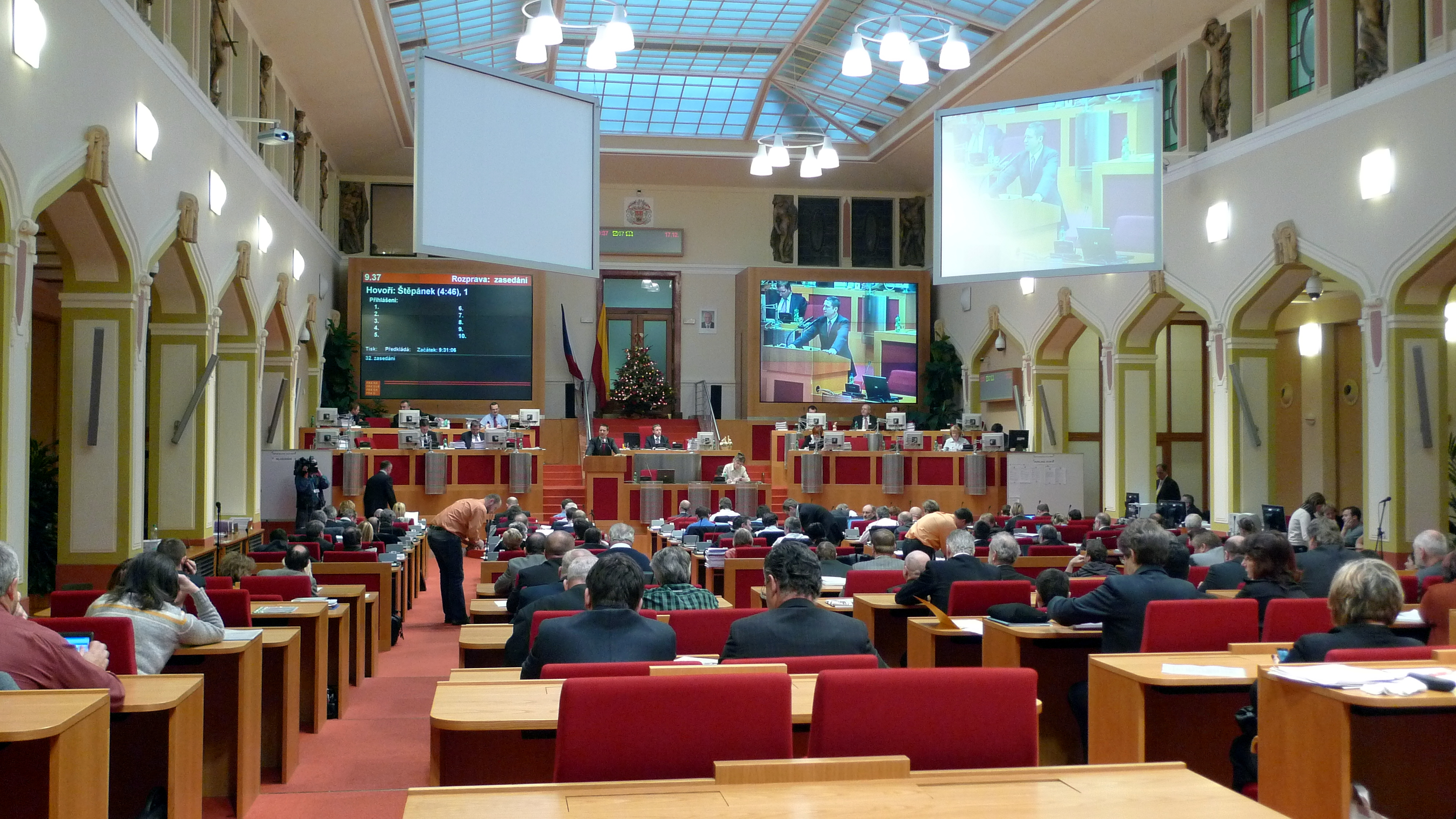
- New City Hall, Mariánské Square

Website
- praha.eu

The Prague City Assembly (Czech: Zastupitelstvo hlavního města Prahy, lit. 'Assembly of the Capital City of Prague') is the elected representative body of Prague, the capital city of the Czech Republic. Under the Act on the Capital City of Prague, the assembly has between 55 and 70 members. It has 65 seats, filled through municipal elections held every four years.

The most recent election took place on 9–10 October 2026. The Mayors and Independents (STAN) won the largest share of the vote, while STAN and Spolu for Prague each secured 17 of the assembly's 65 seats. On 19 November 2026, talks on forming a new governing coalition were completed. Petr Hlaváček was elected the new mayor.

The assembly elects members of the Prague City Council, the city's executive body, including the mayor. It also establishes advisory committees, approves the city budget and other municipal measures, and can confer honorary citizenships and awards. Meetings are normally held monthly and are open to the public. The assembly meets at New City Hall on Mariánské Square.

== Composition and elections ==
The Act on the Capital City of Prague provides for an assembly of 55 to 70 members. Since the 2014 municipal election, Prague has elected 65 assembly members. Members serve four-year terms and are elected by proportional representation.

=== 2026 municipal election ===
The 2026 municipal election in Prague took place on 9 and 10 October. Five electoral lists won representation in the city assembly:

| Electoral list | Vote share | Seats |
|---|---|---|
| Mayors and Independents (STAN) | 23.17% | 17 |
| Spolu for Prague (ODS and TOP 09) | 22.05% | 17 |
| Prague Together | 17.91% | 13 |
| ANO 2011 | 14.36% | 11 |
| Pirates | 9.38% | 7 |
| Total seats | | 65 |

Voter turnout was 46.04%. No other electoral lists won seats. The STAN list was led by Petr Hlaváček; Spolu for Prague by Tomáš Portlík; Prague Together by Adam Scheinherr; and the Pirates by Tereza Nislerová. Following the election, parties began negotiations to form a new majority.

== Responsibilities ==
Prague is a special type of self-governing territorial entity, combining responsibilities normally exercised by both a municipality and a region. The Prague City Assembly accordingly exercises powers analogous to those of municipal councils and regional assemblies.

Members establish committees to advise on matters such as finance, education and national-minority policy. They elect the Prague City Council, an 11-member executive body consisting of the mayor, four deputy mayors and six other councillors. The council implements assembly resolutions and prepares proposals for assembly consideration.

Assembly meetings take place at New City Hall on Mariánské Square. The assembly must meet at least once every three months, although it usually meets monthly or when required. The mayor convenes and presides over its meetings. Unlike city council meetings, assembly sessions are publicly accessible and available through live broadcasts and recordings. Assembly members may approve the city budget, discuss municipal programmes and proposals, and award honorary citizenships and decorations.

== See also ==
- Council of Paris, a similar sui generis deliberative body which exercises powers of both a municipal council and a higher self-governing authority
