= Clam-Gallas Palace =

Palace in Prague, Czech Republic

Coordinates: 50°5′11.19″N 14°25′4.2″E

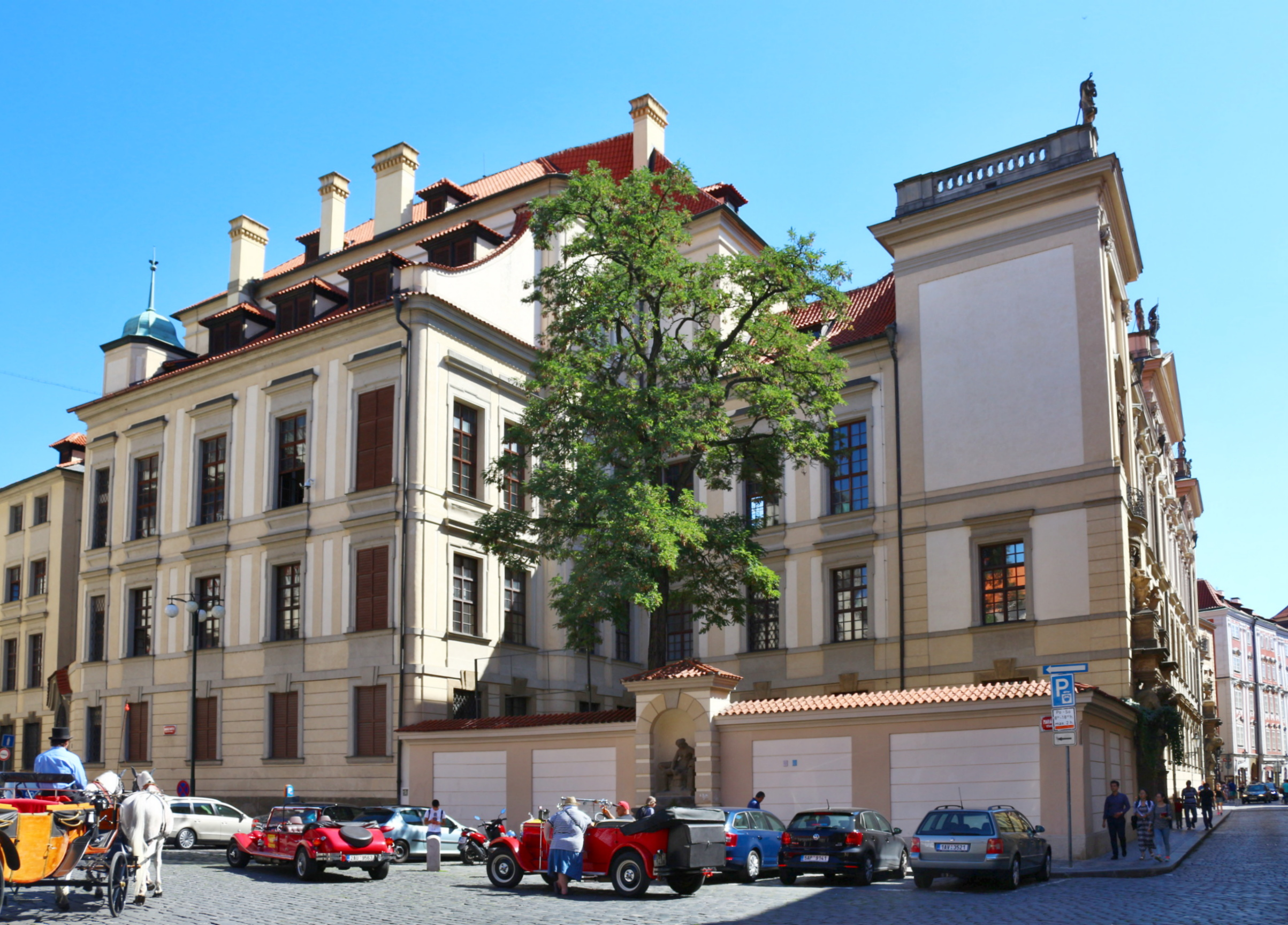
The palace from Mariánské Square

The Clam-Gallas Palace (Czech: Clam-Gallasovský palác) is a Baroque palace in Prague, the capital of the Czech Republic. The building is situated on the corner of Husova Street and Mariánské Square, in Prague's Old Town.

== History ==
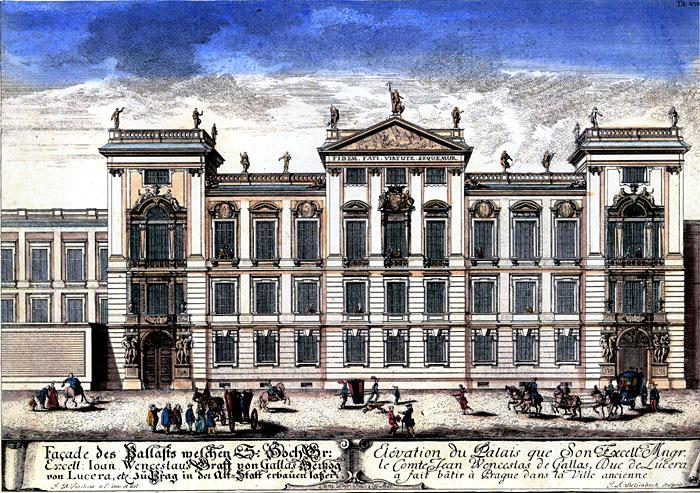
Fischer von Erlach's original design

The palace was first designed by the imperial court architect Johann Bernhard Fischer von Erlach, from Vienna. It was built in 1714–18 by the Italian architect Domenico Canevale. During the rest of the 18th century, balls and concerts were held in the palace, and they were attended by noteworthy artists including Mozart and Beethoven.

The palace was originally built for Count Johann Wenzel von Gallas, a Bohemian nobleman and diplomat. Subsequently, the Gallas family died out in 1757. At that point, the palace was inherited by Christian Philipp von Clam, son of Gallas' sister, which is how the Clam-Gallas family was created.

The building is now owned by the City of Prague, which lends it to the Prague City Archives. In addition, since 2010, a multi-genre festival named "Opera Barocca" is regularly held (twice a year) in the palace premises. This festival is focused on historically informed performance of Baroque music, dance, theatre and carnival.
