= National Archives (Czech Republic) =

Coordinates: 50°2′22.85″N 14°29′40.07″E

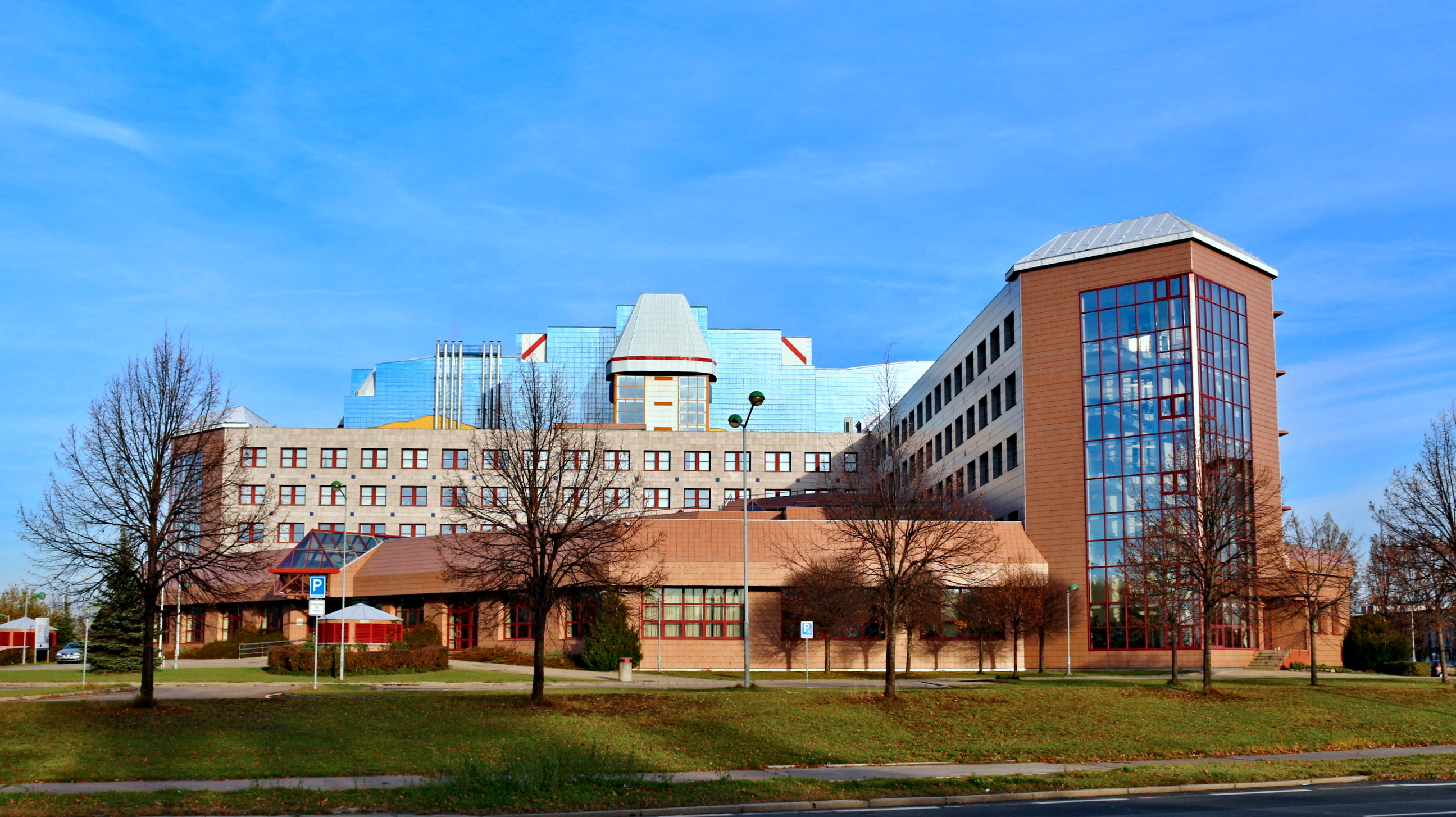
National Archives building in Chodov, Prague

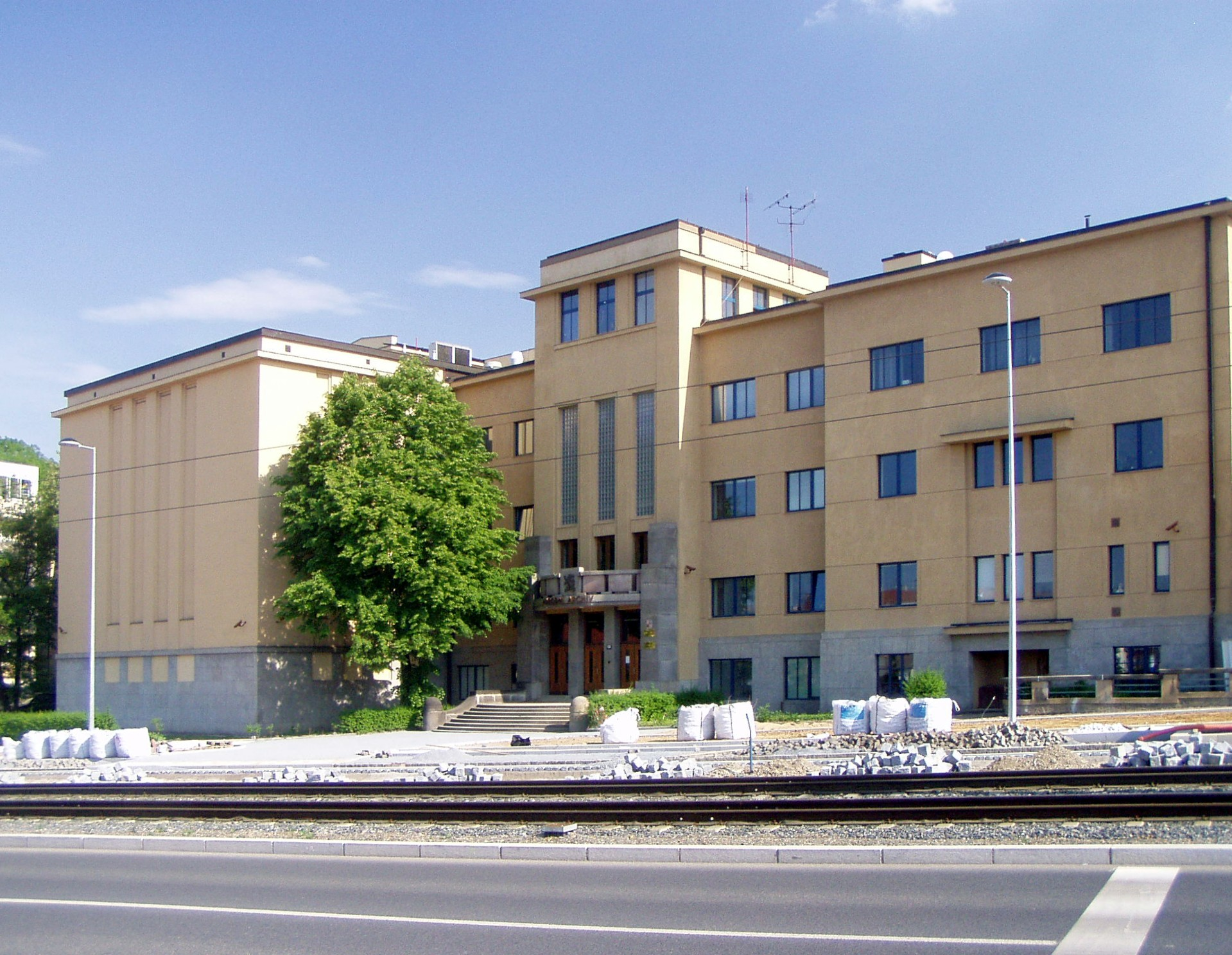
First department of the Czech National Archives

The National Archives (Czech: Národní archiv) is the central archive institution of the Czech Republic. It depends on the Ministry of the Interior. The institution has documents dating to the Early Middle Ages. It is located in Prague.

== Famous documents ==
- Golden Bull of Sicily (1212)
- Zemské desky

== See also ==
- National Library of the Czech Republic
- Prague City Archives
- List of national archives
