= Prague City Council =

Executive body of the City of Prague

Prague City Council Rada hlavního města Prahy

Type
- Type: Region Council (Czech Republic)
- Established: 8th century

Leadership
- Mayor of Prague: Petr Hlaváček, STAN since 19 November 2026

Structure
- Seats: 11
- Political groups: STAN (5) Spolu for Prague (4): ODS (3); TOP 09 (1); Prague Together (2)

Elections
- Last election: October 2026

Meeting place
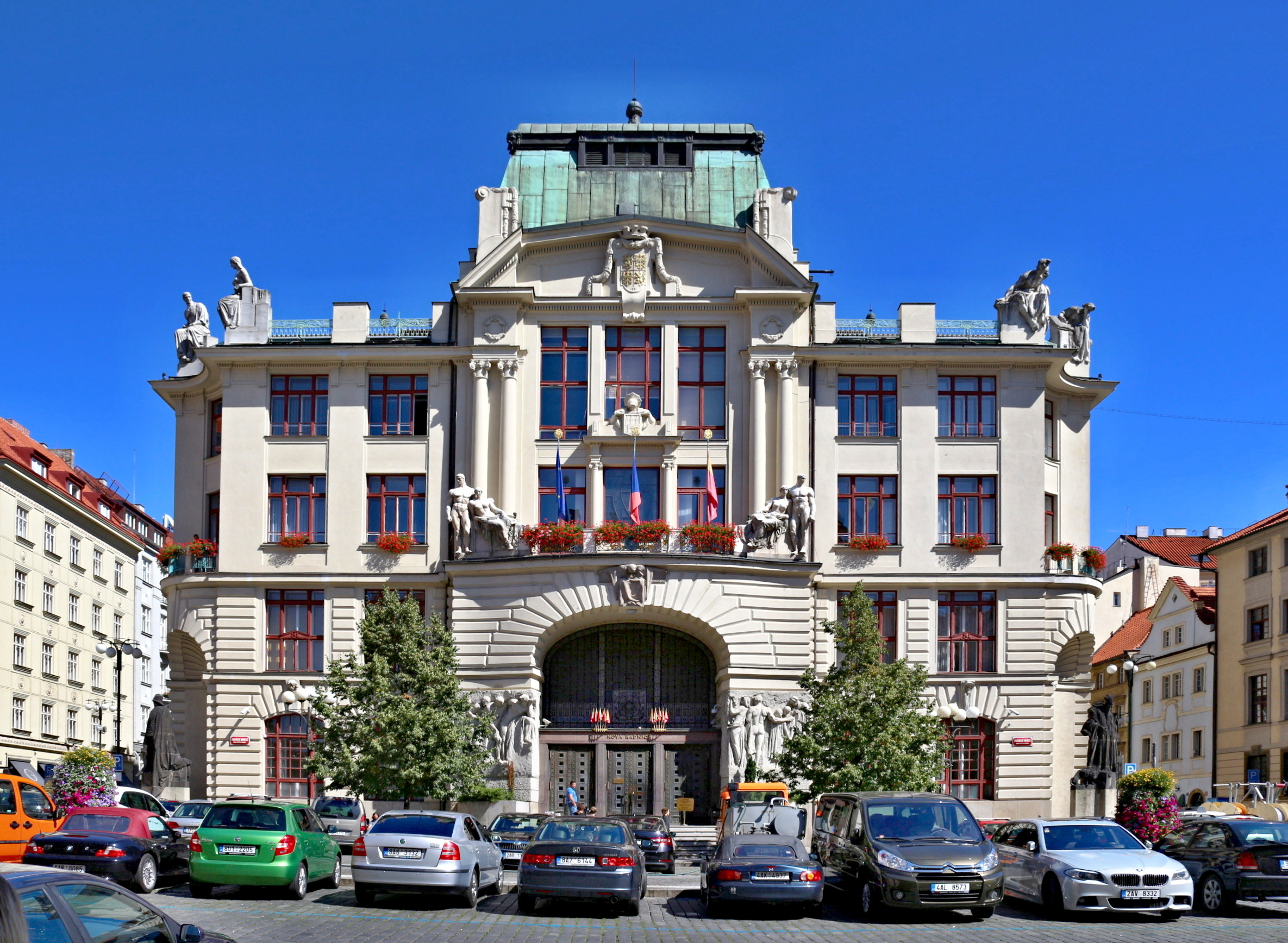
- New City Hall

Website
- praha.eu

The Prague City Council, officially the Council of the Capital City of Prague (Czech: Rada hlavního města Prahy (RHMP)), is the executive body of Prague, the capital city of the Czech Republic. It is appointed by the Prague City Assembly, who elects the council from their own members. The council has 11 members, including the Mayor of Prague, four deputy mayors, and six other councillors. Council meetings are held every Tuesday, or otherwise as needed, and, unlike assembly meetings, are closed to the public. Minutes are taken of the meeting, which every citizen has the right to inspect.

According to the Act on the Capital City of Prague, the law regulating the government of Prague, the Prague City Council has a similar purpose, status and power as a municipal council and a regional council in the Czech Republic. This is because the Capital City of Prague is a separate type of territorial self-governing entity and is therefore neither a region nor a municipality. The council serves as the executive body of the city, ensures the management of the city according to the budget approved by the city assembly, decides on the distribution of subsidies up to a certain amount, and approves the naming and renaming of streets and public spaces. It also issues regulations of the Capital City of Prague within the devolved jurisdiction.
