= List of mayors of Prague =

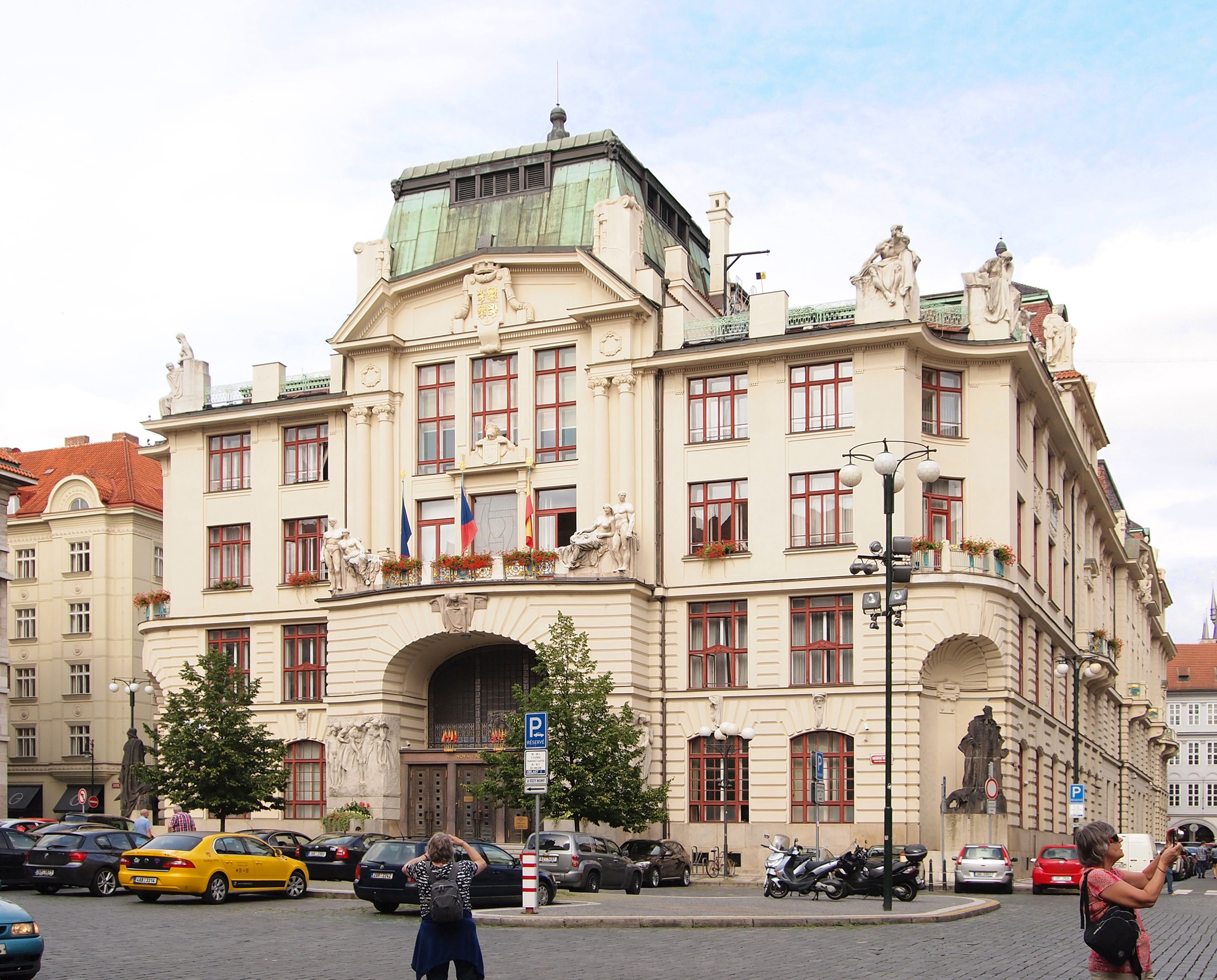
New City Hall

The office of Mayor of Prague was established in 1784. In that year, under Joseph II, the four previously independent neighbouring communities of Malá Strana, Nové Město, Staré Město, and Hradčany were merged into a single entity.

Since 1945, the mayor resides and presides in the New City Hall (on Mariánské Square), completed in 1911.

== Burgomasters of the Royal City of Prague (1784–1882) ==
#	Portrait	Name	Time of office		Terms	Political Party	Appointer(s)
1		Bernard Zahořanský	30 May 1784	1788	1	Nonpartisan	Elected by City Assembly Confirmed by Bohemian Crown
2		Ondřej Steiner	1788	1799	1	Nonpartisan	Elected by City Assembly Confirmed by Bohemian Crown
3		Jan Neuber	June 1800	1804	1	Nonpartisan	Elected by City Assembly Confirmed by Bohemian Crown
4		Ondřej Steiner (Died in office)	1804	4 July 1810	1	Nonpartisan	Elected by City Assembly Confirmed by Bohemian Crown
5		Jan Karl (Died in office)	1811	20 October 1819	1	Nonpartisan	Elected by City Assembly Confirmed by Bohemian Crown
6		Josef Kirpal (Died in office)	20 May 1820	22 February 1823	1	Nonpartisan	Elected by City Assembly Confirmed by Bohemian Crown
7		Peter von Sporschill (Died in office)	29 June 1825	31 July 1838	1	Nonpartisan	Elected by City Assembly Confirmed by Bohemian Crown
8		Josef Müller of Jiřetín	17 April 1839	March 1848	1	Nonpartisan	Elected by City Assembly Confirmed by Bohemian Crown
9		Antonín Strobach	9 April 1848	18 May 1848	1/2	Old Czech	Elected by City Assembly Confirmed by Bohemian Crown
10		Tomáš Pštross	18 May 1848	31 May 1848	1/2	Old Czech	Elected by City Assembly Confirmed by Bohemian Crown
11		Václav Vaňka	31 May 1848	11 April 1861	3	Nonpartisan	Elected by City Assembly Confirmed by Bohemian Crown
12		František Václav Pštross (Died in office)	11 April 1861	12 June 1863	1/2	Old Czech	Elected by City Assembly Confirmed by Bohemian Crown
13		Václav Bělský	12 June 1863	4 November 1867	1/2	Old Czech	Elected by City Assembly Confirmed by Bohemian Crown
14		Karel Klaudy	7 January 1868	23 September 1869	1/2	Old Czech	Elected by City Assembly Confirmed by Bohemian Crown
15		František Dittrich	28 February 1870	9 April 1873	1/2	Old Czech	Elected by City Assembly Confirmed by Bohemian Crown
16		Josef Huleš	9 April 1873	May 1876	1/2	Old Czech	Elected by City Assembly Confirmed by Bohemian Crown
17		Emilián Skramlík	12 July 1876	31 August 1882	1 1/2	Old Czech	Elected by City Assembly Confirmed by Bohemian Crown

== Mayors of the Royal City of Prague (1882–1918) ==
#	Portrait	Name	Time of office		Terms	Political Party	Appointer(s)
1		Tomáš Černý	1 September 1882	1885	1	Old Czech	Elected by City Assembly Confirmed by Bohemian Crown
2		Ferdinand Vališ (Died in office)	1885	19 September 1887	1/2	Old Czech	Elected by City Assembly Confirmed by Bohemian Crown
3		Jindřich Šolc	19 September 1887	17 November 1893	2	Old Czech	Elected by City Assembly Confirmed by Bohemian Crown
4		Čeněk Gregor	17 November 1893	12 December 1896	1	Old Czech	Elected by City Assembly Confirmed by Bohemian Crown
5		Jan Podlipný	2 January 1897	18 January 1900	1	Young Czech	Elected by City Assembly Confirmed by Bohemian Crown
6		Vladimír Srb	5 February 1900	10 February 1906	2	Old Czech	Elected by City Assembly Confirmed by Bohemian Crown
7		Karel Groš	15 February 1906	31 October 1918	4 1/2	Young Czech	Elected by City Assembly Confirmed by Bohemian Crown

== Mayors of Prague (1918–present) ==
#	Portrait	Name	Time of office		Terms	Political Party	Appointer(s)
1		Přemysl Šámal	13 November 1918	15 June 1919	1/3	National Democracy	Elected by City Assembly (1919–1948)
2		Karel Baxa	15 June 1919	5 April 1937	3 1/2	National Social	Elected by City Assembly (1919–1948)
3		Petr Zenkl	6 April 1937	24 February 1939	1/2	National Social	Elected by City Assembly (1919–1948)
4		Otakar Klapka	24 February 1939	9 July 1940	1/2	National Social	Elected by City Assembly (1919–1948)
5		Alois Říha	17 July 1940	5 May 1945	1	National Partnership (Collaborationist)	Elected by City Assembly (1919–1948)
6		Václav Vacek	8 May 1945	7 August 1945	Prov.	Communist	Elected by City Assembly (1919–1948)
7		Petr Zenkl	27 August 1945	1 July 1946	1/5	National Social	Elected by City Assembly (1919–1948)
8		Václav Vacek	1 July 1946	21 May 1954	2	Communist	Elected by City Committee of the KSČ (1948–1990)
9		Adolf Svoboda	21 May 1954	29 June 1964	1	Communist	Elected by City Committee of the KSČ (1948–1990)
10		Ludvík Černý	29 June 1964	10 September 1970	1	Communist	Elected by City Committee of the KSČ (1948–1990)
11		Zdeněk Zuska	10 September 1970	22 June 1981	1	Communist	Elected by City Committee of the KSČ (1948–1990)
12		František Štafa	22 June 1981	4 July 1988	1	Communist	Elected by City Committee of the KSČ (1948–1990)
13		Zdeněk Horčík	4 July 1988	8 December 1989	1	Communist	Elected by City Committee of the KSČ (1948–1990)
14		Josef Hájek	8 December 1989	23 January 1990	1	Communist	Elected by City Committee of the KSČ (1948–1990)
15		Jaroslav Kořán	1 February 1990	13 September 1991	Prov.	Civic Forum	Elected by City Assembly (1990–present)
16		Milan Kondr	28 September 1991	13 May 1993	2/4	Civic Democratic	Elected by City Assembly (1990–present)
17		Jan Koukal	13 May 1993	26 November 1998	1 1/4	Civic Democratic	Elected by City Assembly (1990–present)
18		Jan Kasl	26 November 1998	28 May 2002	3/4	Civic Democratic	Elected by City Assembly (1990–present)
19		Igor Němec	28 May 2002	28 November 2002	1/4	Civic Democratic	Elected by City Assembly (1990–present)
20		Pavel Bém	28 November 2002	30 November 2010	2	Civic Democratic	Elected by City Assembly (1990–present)
21		Bohuslav Svoboda	30 November 2010	23 May 2013	3/4	Civic Democratic	Elected by City Assembly (1990–present)
22		Tomáš Hudeček	20 June 2013	26 November 2014	1/4	TOP 09	Elected by City Assembly (1990–present)
23		Adriana Krnáčová	26 November 2014	15 November 2018	1	ANO 2011	Elected by City Assembly (1990–present)
24		Zdeněk Hřib	15 November 2018	16 February 2023	1	Pirates	Elected by City Assembly (1990–present)
25		Bohuslav Svoboda	16 February 2023	19 November 2026	1	Civic Democratic	Elected by City Assembly (1990–present)
26		Petr Hlaváček	19 November 2026	Incumbent		STAN	Elected by City Assembly (1990–present)
