= Dlouhá Lhota =

Dlouhá Lhota may refer to places in the Czech Republic:

- Dlouhá Lhota (Blansko District), a municipality and village in the South Moravian Region
- Dlouhá Lhota (Mladá Boleslav District), a municipality and village in the Central Bohemian Region
- Dlouhá Lhota (Příbram District), a municipality and village in the Central Bohemian Region
- Dlouhá Lhota (Tábor District), a municipality and village in the South Bohemian Region
- Dlouhá Lhota, a village and part of Maršovice (Benešov District) in the Central Bohemian Region
