= 2014 Czech Pirate Party leadership election =

- 2 August 2014
- Turnout: 36.2%
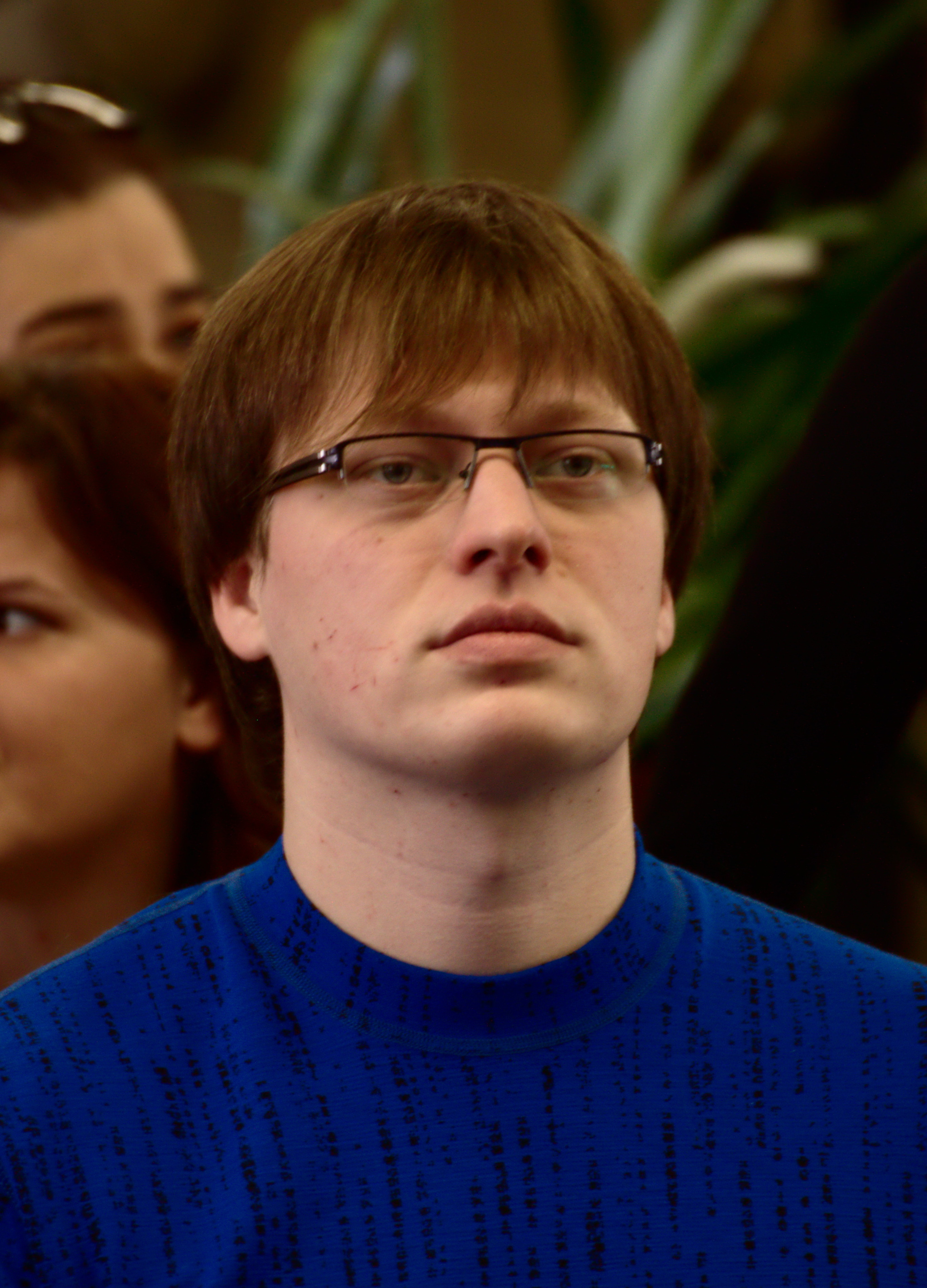

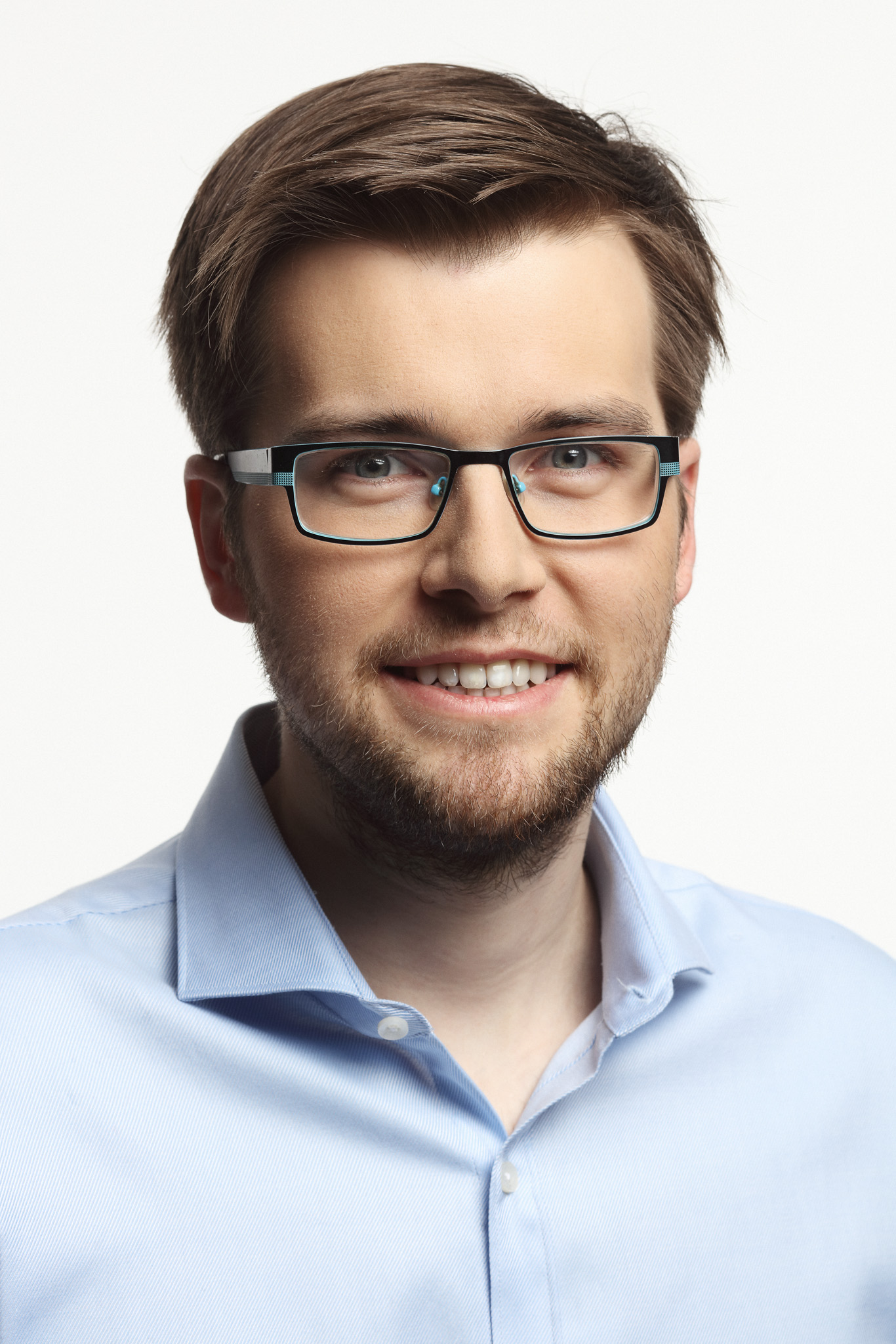

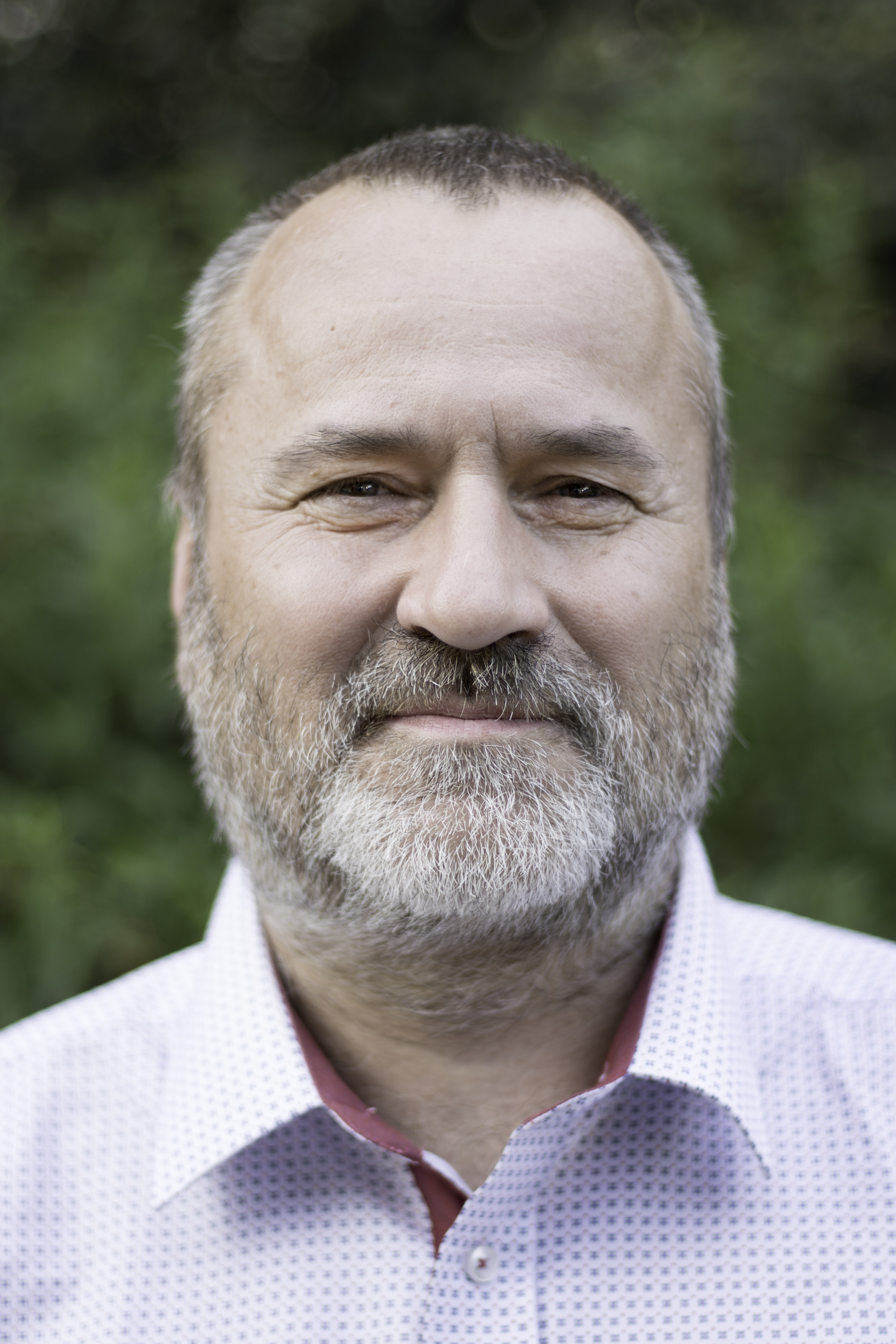
Candidate	Lukáš Černohorský	Jakub Michálek	Ivo Vašíček
Popular vote	78	55	41
Percentage	44%	31%	23%
Leader of Pirates before election
Ivan Bartoš
Elected Leader of Pirates
Lukáš Černohorský

The Czech Pirate Party leadership election of 2014 was held on 2 August 2014. Lukáš Černohorský was elected new leader of the party.

== Background ==
Czech Pirate Party was led by Ivan Bartoš who led during the 2014 European Parliament election. It narrowly failed to reach electoral threshold and Bartoš decided to resign. Party had to face inner conflicts after the election which was another reason of Bartoš' resignation. Lukáš Černohorský, Jakub Michalek and Ivo Vašíček decided to run for the position. Bartoš endorsed Černohorský.

== Voting ==
Candidate	1st round	%	2nd round	%
Lukáš Černohorský	88	57.52	78	44.07
Jakub Michálek	86	56.21	55	31.1
Ivo Vašíček	82	53.59	41	23.16
Ondřej Profant	54	35.29		
Václav Málek	36	23.53		
Tomáš Klapka	22	14.38		
Josef Úlehla	16	10.46		
turnout	153		176	

Three candidates advanced form 1st round of voting. Černohorský received 78 votes, Michálek 55 votes and Vašíček 41 votes.
