= January 2024 Czech Pirate Party leadership election =

- 13 January 2024
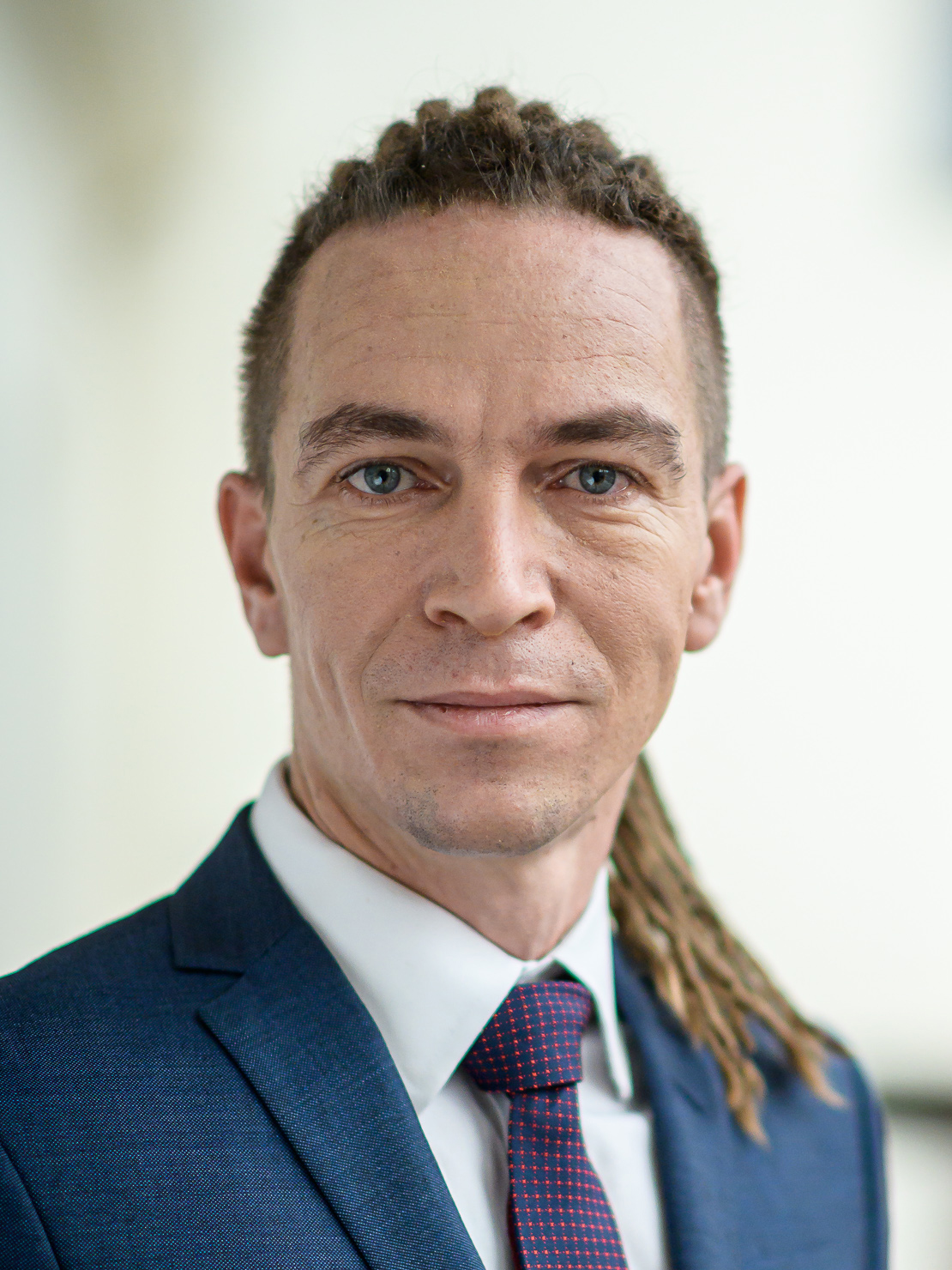

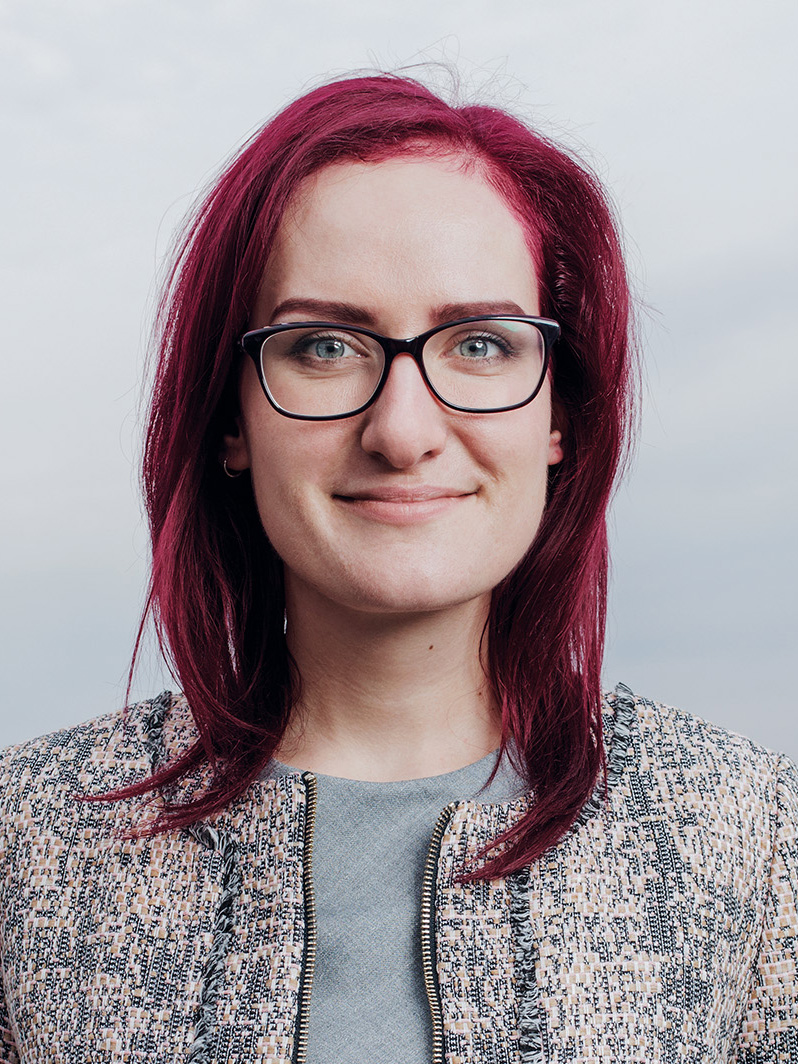
| Candidate | Ivan Bartoš | Markéta Gregorová |
| Popular vote | 556 | 300 |
| Percentage | 64.95% | 35.05% |
Leader of Pirates before election
Ivan Bartoš
Elected Leader of Pirates
Ivan Bartoš

The Czech Pirate Party held a leadership election on 13 January 2024.

== Background ==
The Czech Pirate Party has been led by Ivan Bartoš since 2016. Under his leadership, they became the third largest party in the Czech Republic after the 2017 parliamentary election, with 22 seats. Bartoš also led the party during the 2021 election, which the party contested as part of the Pirates and Mayors electoral alliance. Due to preferential voting, the Pirates received only 4 seats of the 37 seats won by the alliance. After the election, a part of the membership called for Bartoš's resignation. The party joined the new government following the election.

Governor of Plzeň Region Rudolf Špoták announced candidacy on 7 November 2023. The incumbent leader Ivan Bartoš announced candidacy on 4 December 2023. Markéta Gregorová, member of European Parliament announced candidacy in December 2023 as a candidate of Pirates who want to leave the government. Bartoš received 12 regional nominations while Gregorová 2. Former MP Vojtěch Pikal received 2 nominations but in January 2024 announced that he won't run. Špoták failed to receive any nominations thus dropped out of the race on 18 December 2023.

== Candidates ==
- Ivan Bartoš, incumbent leader and Minister of Regional Development.
- Markéta Gregorová, MEP.
- Rudolf Špoták, Governor of Plzeň Region. Failed to win any nominations thus had to drop out.

=== Announced but did not run ===
- Vojtěch Pikal, former MP.

== Result ==
Voting took place on 13 January 2024. Every member of the party was allowed to vote. In the first round voters marked which candidates are acceptable for them. Candidates with more than 50% would advance to the second round. Bartoš received 569 votes of 820 while Gregorová 455 in the first round thus both candidates advanced. Bartoš then went on to defeat Gregorová.

Result
| Candidate | 1st round | 2nd round |
|---|---|---|
| Ivan Bartoš | 569 | 556 |
| Markéta Gregorová | 455 | 300 |
