= 2012 Czech Pirate Party leadership election =

- 25 August 2012
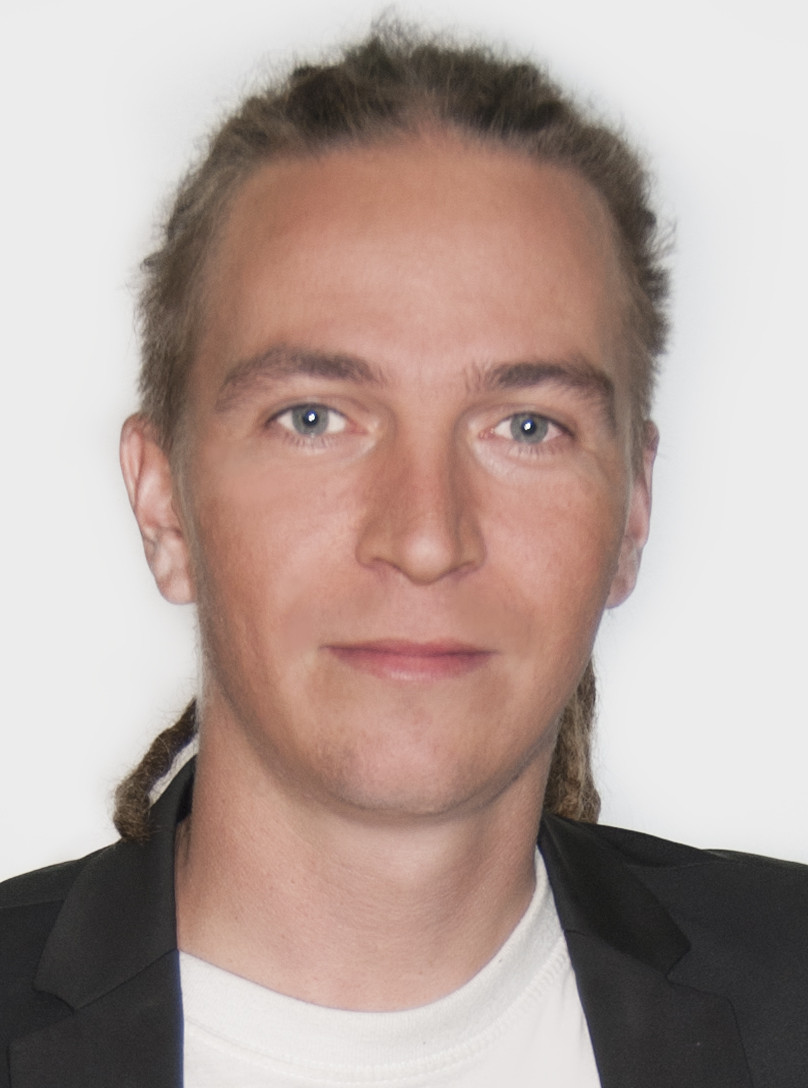

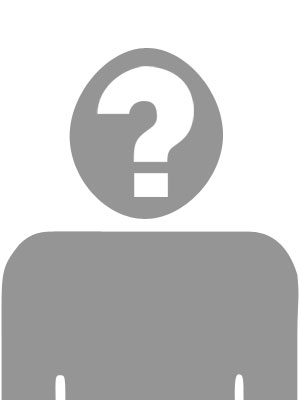
Candidate	Ivan Bartoš	Petr Bajgar
Popular vote	57	14
Percentage	80.28%	19.72%
Leader of Pirates before election
Ivan Bartoš
Elected Leader of Pirates
Ivan Bartoš

The Czech Pirate Party leadership election of 2012 was held on 25 August 2012. Ivan Bartoš was reelected when he defeated Petr Bajgar. Bajgar was nominated by South Moravian Piraret.

== Voting ==
Bartoš received 57 votes while Bajgar only 14.
