= 2018 Czech Pirate Party leadership election =

- 6 January 2018
- Turnout: 55%
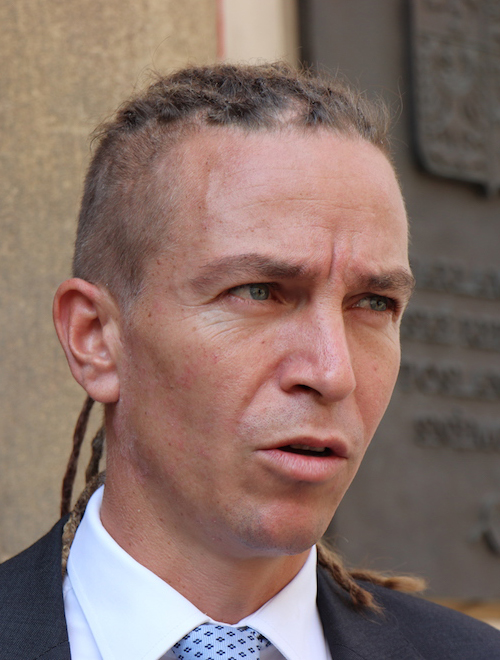
Candidate	Ivan Bartoš
Popular vote	276
Percentage	94.2%
Leader of Pirates before election
Ivan Bartoš
Elected Leader of Pirates
Ivan Bartoš

The Czech Pirate Party leadership election of 2018 was held on 6 January 2018. It will be held after successful 2017 legislative election. The incumbent leader Ivan Bartoš ran for another term. Bartoš was the only candidate and was reelected by winning 276 votes. Only 17 members voted against him.

== Background ==
Czech Pirate Party became the third largest party in the Czech Republic after 2017 legislative election. Party's statutes state that next leadership election should be held no later than 3 months after legislative election. The incumbent leader Ivan Bartoš announced he will seek another term and asked for nomination of Liberec region organisation.
