= 2016 Czech Pirate Party leadership election =

- 2 April 2016
- Turnout: 36.2%
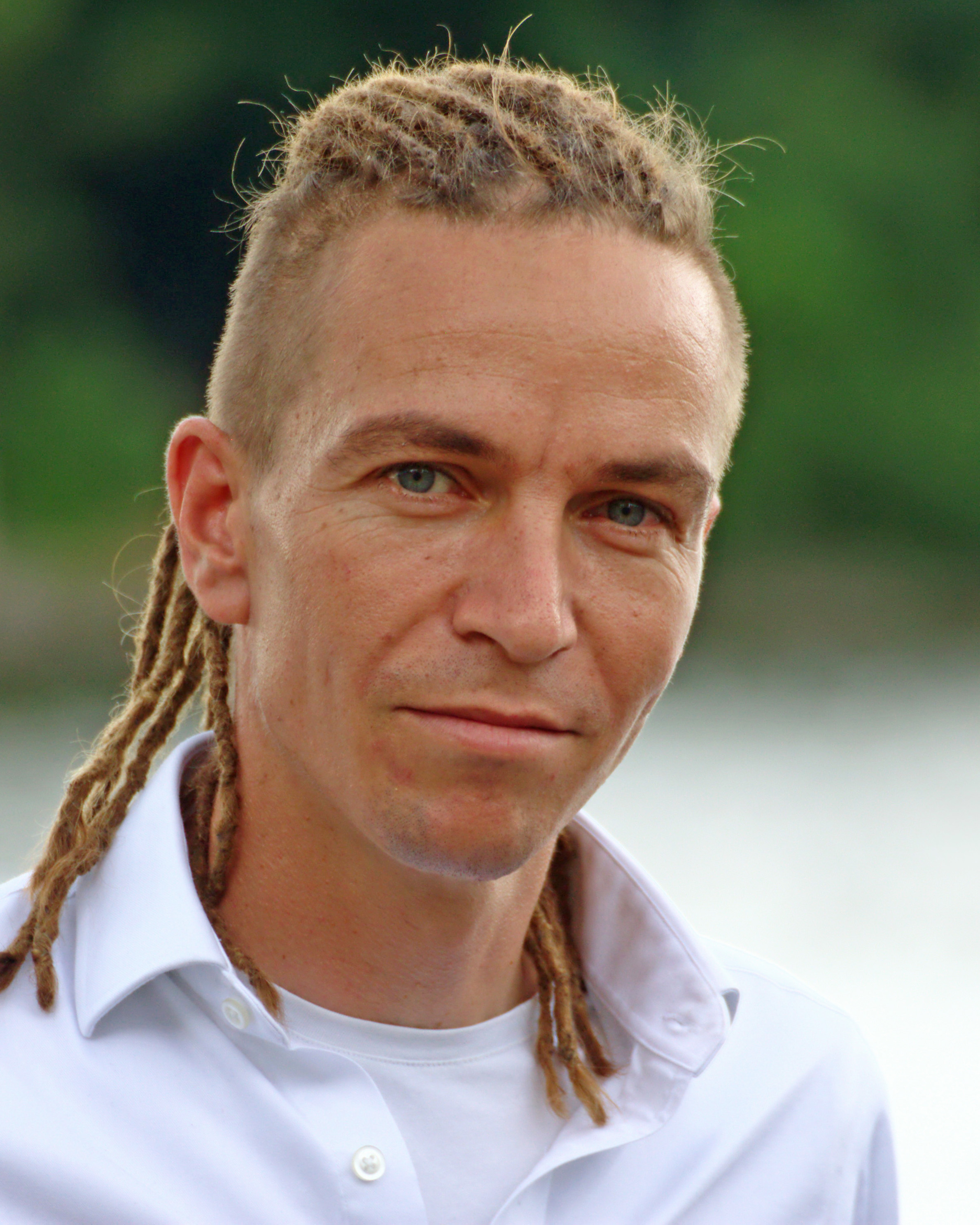

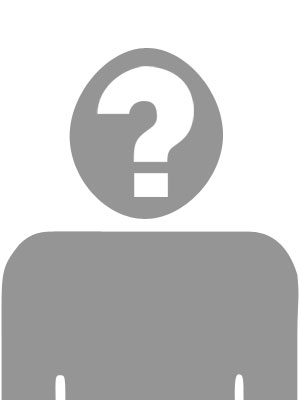
Candidate	Ivan Bartoš	Petr Bajgar
Popular vote	126	32
Percentage	79.7%	20.3%
Leader of Pirates before election
Lukáš Černohorský
Elected Leader of Pirates
Ivan Bartoš

The Czech Pirate Party leadership election of 2016 was held on 2 April 2016. Ivan Bartoš was elected the new leader. Members of the party were allowed to vote through internet.

== Background ==
Election was scheduled for meeting in Olomouc. The incumbent leader Černohorský decided to not run. Ivan Bartoš who previously led the party decided to run and was considered the front-runner.

== Voting ==
Voting took place on 2 April 2016. Members of the party voted via internet. Bartoš received 126 votes while Bajgar only 32. Bartoš became the new leader.
