= 2020 Czech Pirate Party leadership election =

- 11 January 2020
- Turnout: 63.4%
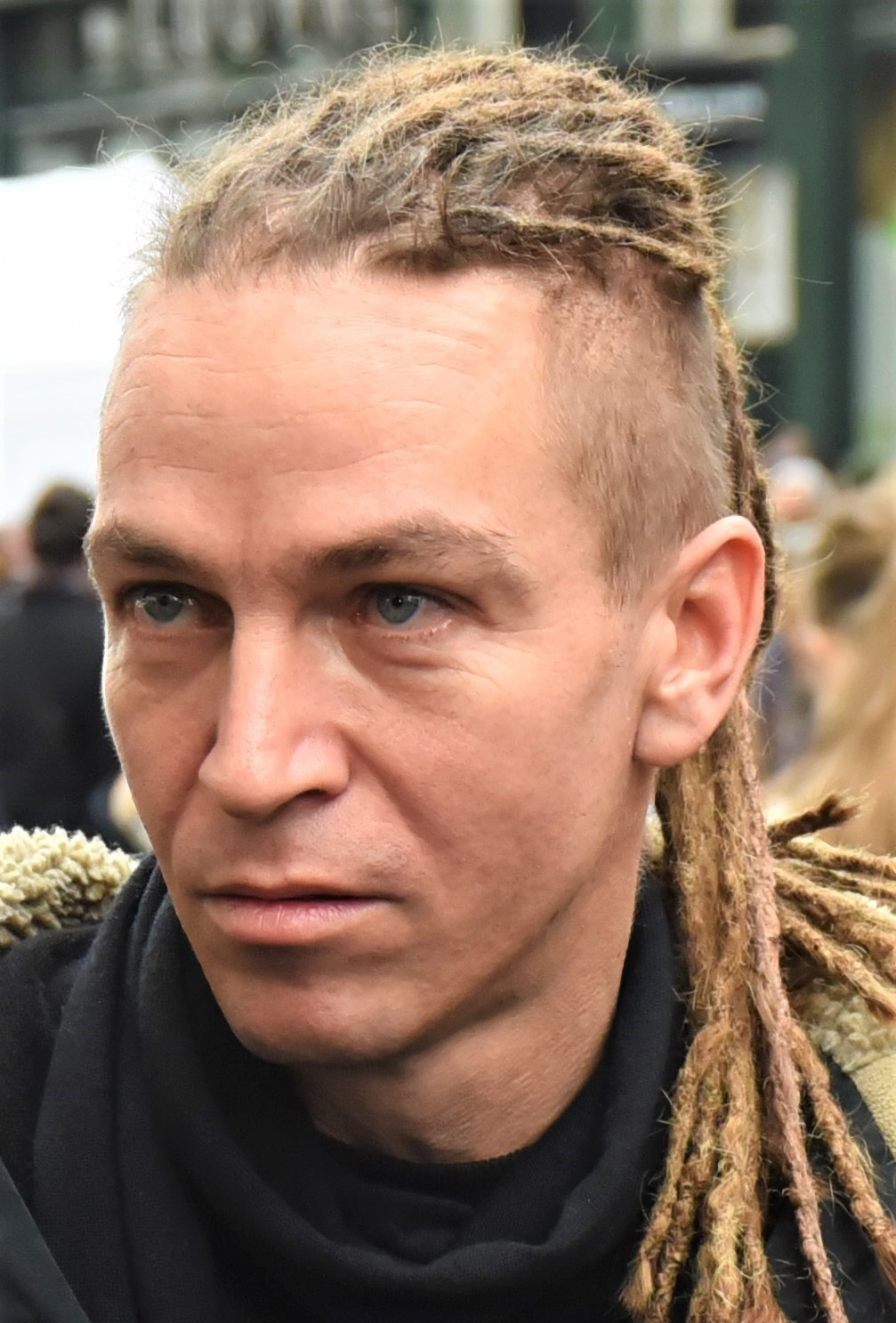

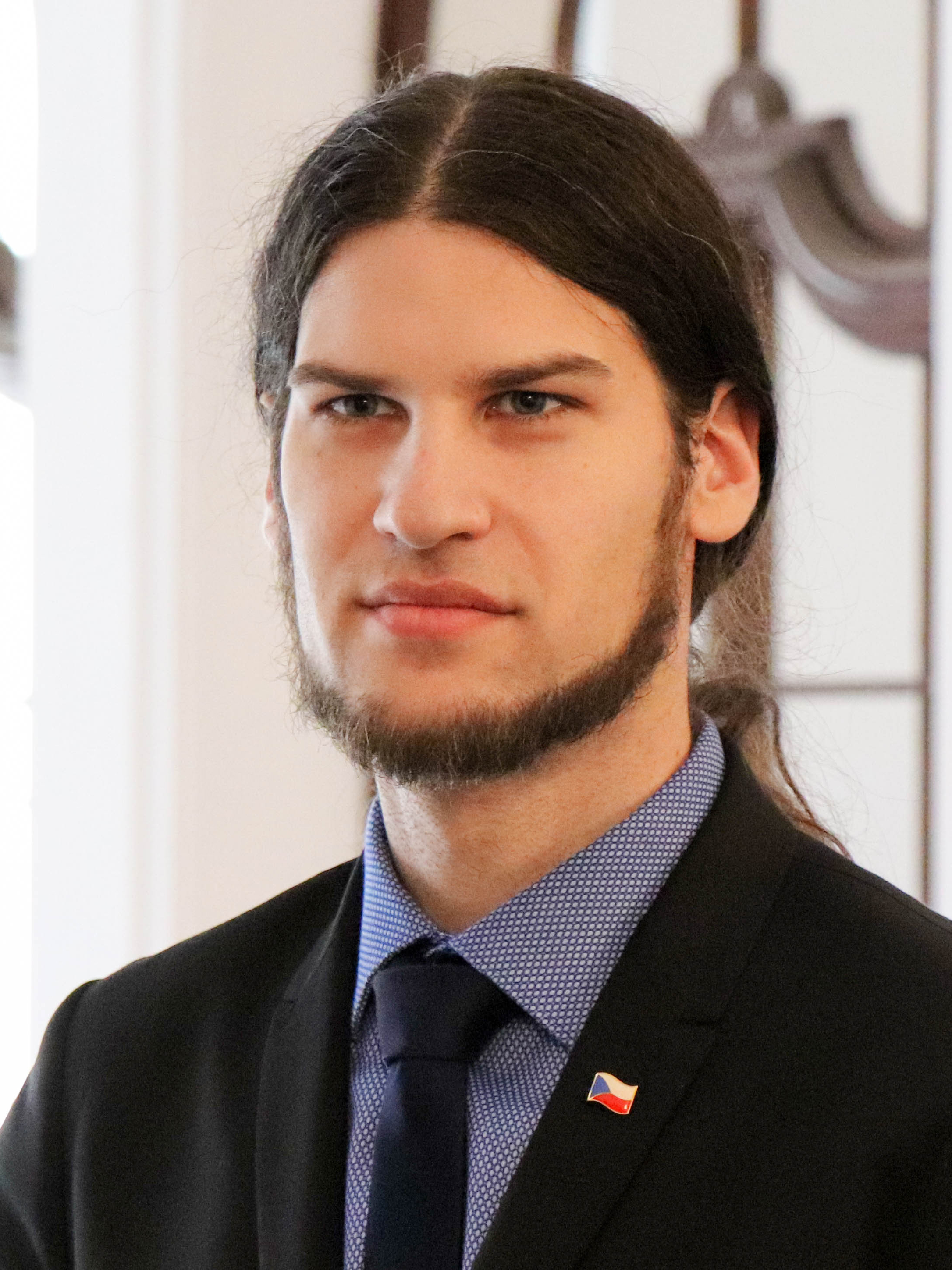

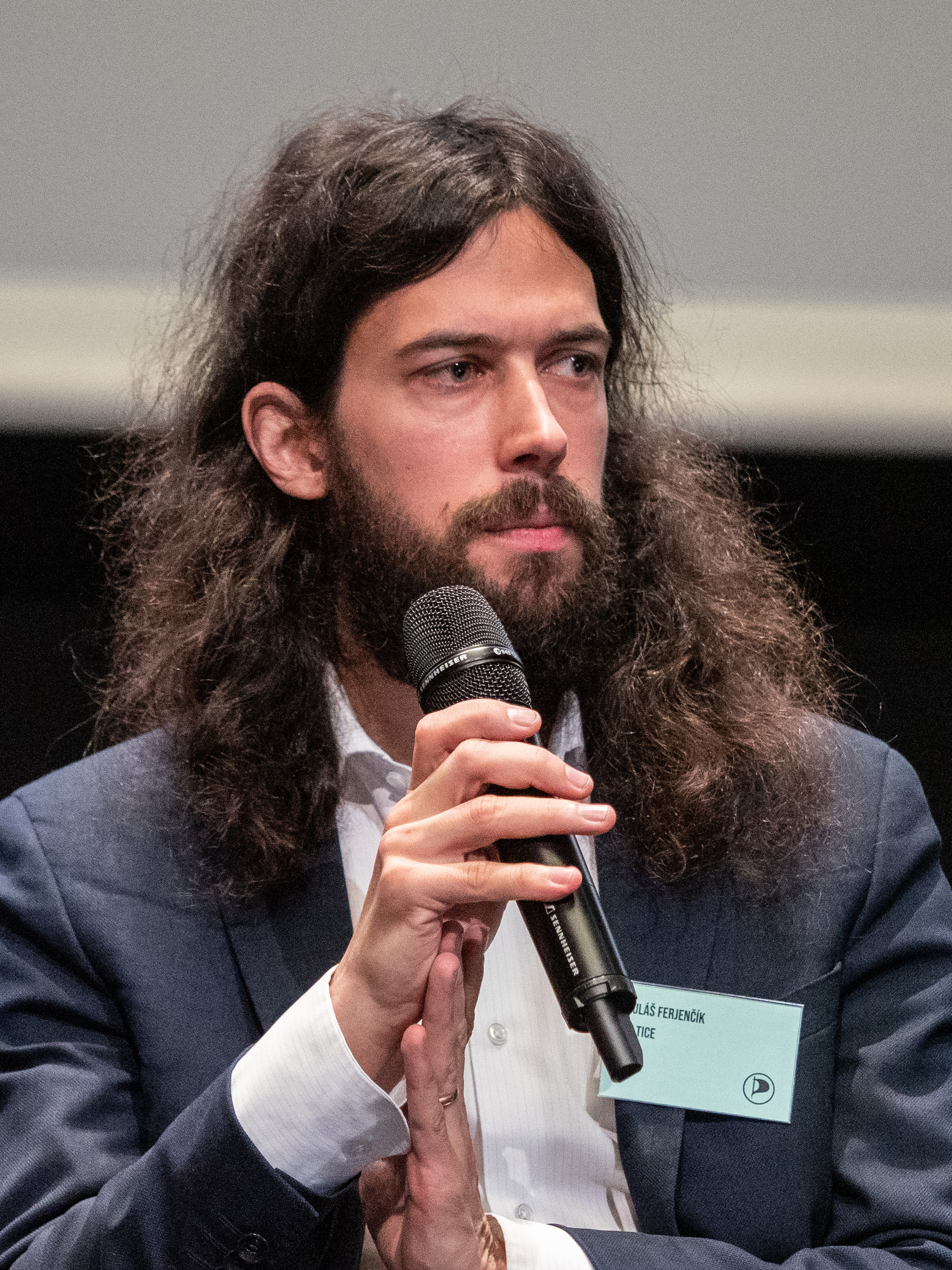
Candidate	Ivan Bartoš	Vojtěch Pikal	Mikuláš Ferjenčík
Popular vote	606	376	261
Percentage	92.8%	57.6%	40.0%
Leader of Pirates before election
Ivan Bartoš
Elected Leader of Pirates
Ivan Bartoš

The Czech Pirate Party leadership election of 2020 was held on 11 January 2020. Ivan Bartoš was reelected when he defeated Vojtěch Pikal and Mikuláš Ferjenčík.

== Background ==
Bartoš leads party since 2016. He decided to run for another term. Deputy Speaker of the Chamber of Deputies Vojtěch Pikal and MP Mikuláš Ferjenčík decided to challenge him.

Bartoš was viewed as front-runner as he received nominations from 9 regional organisations while Pikal and Ferjenčík only one nomination each.

== Voting ==
Voting took place on 11 January 2020. Every member of the party was allowed to vote. In the first round voters marked which candidates are acceptable for them. Candidates with more than 50% would advance to the second round. Bartoš and Pikal advanced while Ferjenčík was eliminated. Pikal then withdraw his candidacy so the second round wasn't held and Bartoš was reelected.
