= Lukáš Černohorský =

Czech Pirate Party politician (born 1984)

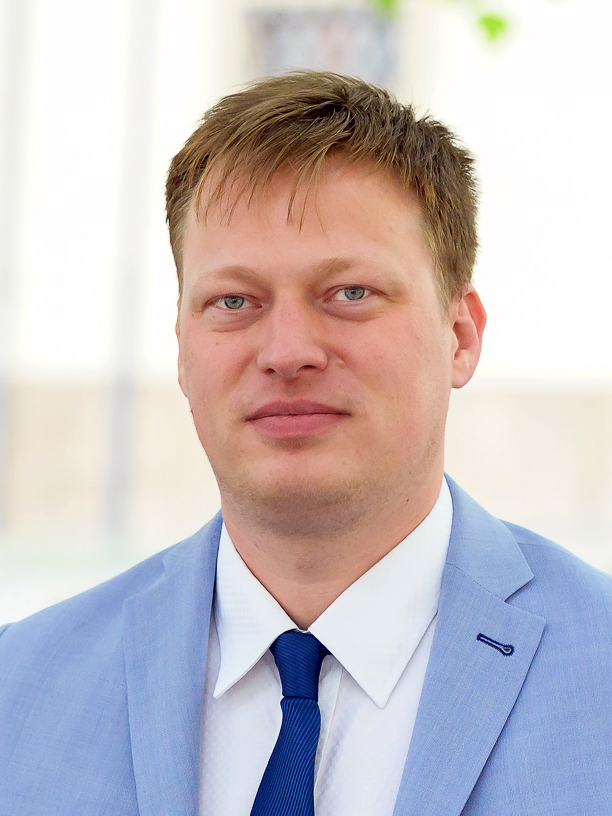
- Černohorský in 2020

Leader of the Czech Pirate Party
- In office 2 August 2014 – 2 April 2016
- Preceded by: Ivan Bartoš
- Succeeded by: Ivan Bartoš

Member of the Chamber of Deputies
- In office 21 October 2017 – 21 October 2021

Personal details
- Born: 19 November 1984 (age 41) Dlouhá Lhota, Czechoslovakia
- Party: Czech Pirate Party
- Education: VSB – Technical University of Ostrava

Lukáš Černohorský (born 19 November 1984) is a Czech politician and IT analyst. He was the chairman of the Czech Pirate Party from August 2014 to April 2016 and a member of the Chamber of Deputies from 2017 to 2021. In January 2018, Černohorský was appointed chairman of the OKD Commission of Inquiry.

== Early life ==
Černohorský was born in Dlouhá Lhota in Czechoslovakia (now the Czech Republic), before moving to Ostrava with his parents. In 2004, he graduated from the Secondary Industrial School of Electrical Engineering. He subsequently graduated in measurement and control technology at the VSB – Technical University of Ostrava in 2010.

Černohorský worked as an IT analyst and later as a test engineer until 2012. He was involved as a spokesman and member of the petitions committee, which works to preserve three historic buildings in Ostrava known as Ostravica-Textilia.

== Political career ==
In the municipal elections in 2010, he ran unsuccessfully for the Ostrava City Council, and later also failed to be elected in regional elections in 2012 in the Moravian-Silesian Region, as leader of the Pirate list. He ran for the Pirates in the Moravian-Silesian Region in elections to the Chamber of Deputies in 2010 and in 2013, but was not elected.

Černohorský was elected chairman of the Czech Pirate Party at a national forum in Prague on 2 August 2014, receiving 78 votes. In the 2014 municipal elections, he was the lead candidate for the We are Ostrava coalition — a coalition of the Green Party and Pirates, but the group did not get into the city council. Černohorský served as party chairman until April 2016.

In the 2016 Czech Senate election, Černohorský attempted to run in District No. 73 - Frýdek-Místek, but his candidacy was rejected due to not meeting the legal age limit. He was the leader of the Pirate list in the Moravian-Silesian Region in the 2016 regional elections, but again was not elected.

In the 2017 Czech parliamentary election, Černohorský was the leader of the Pirates in the Moravian-Silesian Region, and was elected as a deputy. In the 2018 Czech municipal elections, he ran for the Pirates for the Ostrava City Council, but was unsuccessful.

In the elections to the Chamber of Deputies in 2021, he was the lead candidate for the Pirates and Mayors coalition in the Moravian-Silesian Region, but was not re-elected.
