= Dlouhá Lhota (Tábor District) =

- Municipality
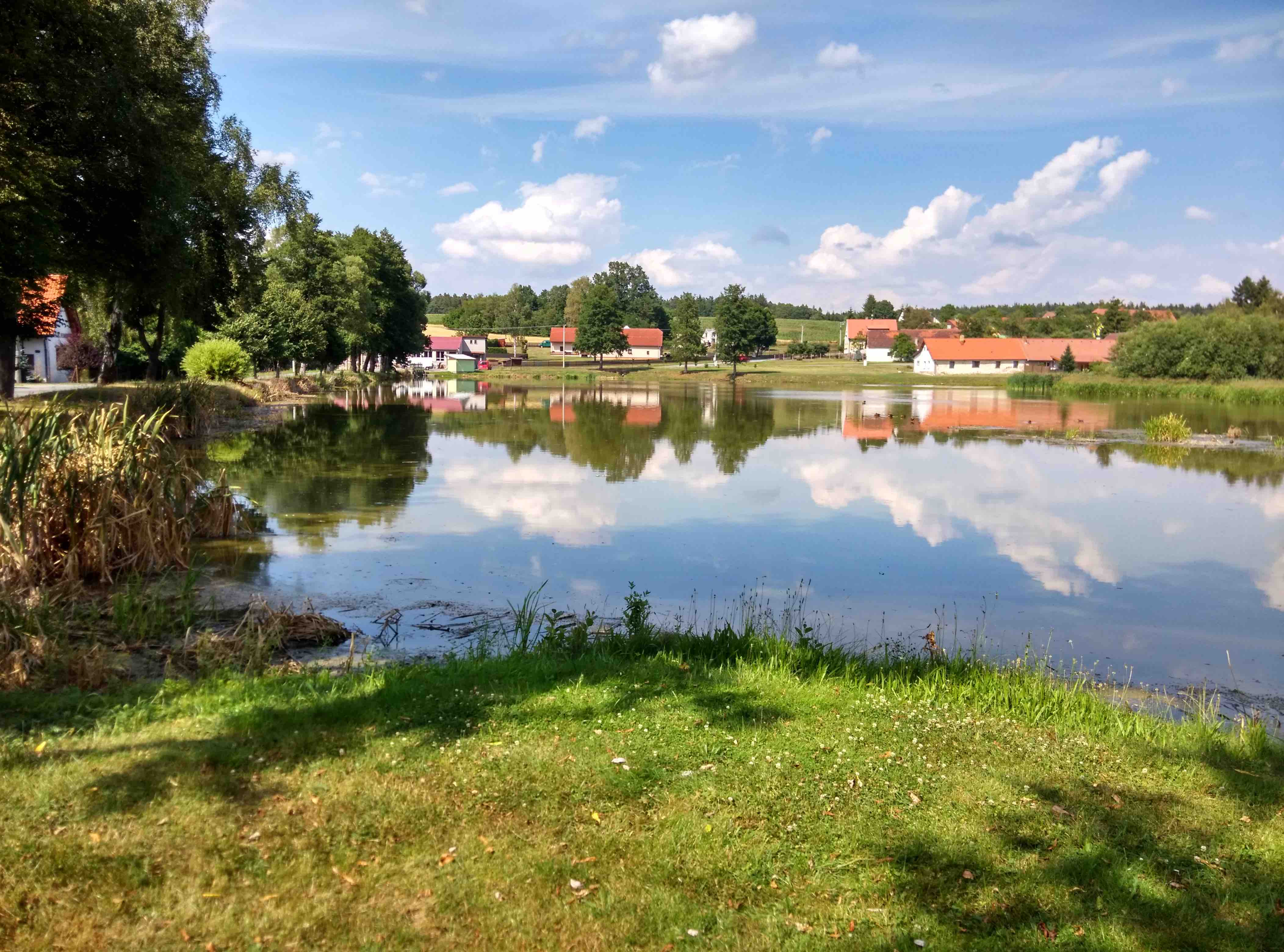
- Fishpond Návesní rybník

- Location in the Czech Republic
- Coordinates: 49°21′9″N 14°47′20″E
- Country: Czech Republic
- Region: South Bohemian
- District: Tábor
- First mentioned: 1396

Area
  - Total: 4.44 km^{2} (1.71 sq mi)
- Elevation: 455 m (1,493 ft)

Population (2026-01-01)
  - Total: 173
  - Density: 39.0/km^{2} (101/sq mi)
- Time zone: UTC+1 (CET)
  - Summer (DST): UTC+2 (CEST)
- Postal code: 391 55
- Website: www.dlouha-lhota.cz

Dlouhá Lhota is a municipality and village in Tábor District in the South Bohemian Region of the Czech Republic. It has about 200 inhabitants.

== Etymology ==
The name means 'long Lhota' in Czech.

== Geography ==
Dlouhá Lhota is located about 10 kilometres (6 mi) southeast of Tábor and 47 km (29 mi) northeast of České Budějovice. It lies on the border between the Křemešník Highlands and Tábor Uplands. The highest point is at 508 m (1,667 ft) above sea level. The stream Borecký potok flows through the municipality and supplies several fishponds there.

== History ==
The first written mention of Dlouhá Lhota is from 1396, when it belonged to the Radenín estate. The village experienced its golden age in the 19th century, when the population grew and reached 420 inhabitants. Dlouhá Lhota was badly damaged by floods in 1888.

== Demographics ==
Historical population

Year	Pop.	±%
1869	384	—
1880	387	+0.8%
1890	343	−11.4%
1900	332	−3.2%
1910	321	−3.3%

Year	Pop.	±%
1921	283	−11.8%
1930	278	−1.8%
1950	221	−20.5%
1961	212	−4.1%
1970	177	−16.5%

Year	Pop.	±%
1980	165	−6.8%
1991	178	+7.9%
2001	174	−2.2%
2011	159	−8.6%
2021	154	−3.1%

Source: Censuses

== Transport ==
There are no railways or major roads passing through the municipality.

== Sights ==
There are no protected cultural monuments in the municipality.
