= Dlouhá Lhota (Příbram District) =

- Municipality
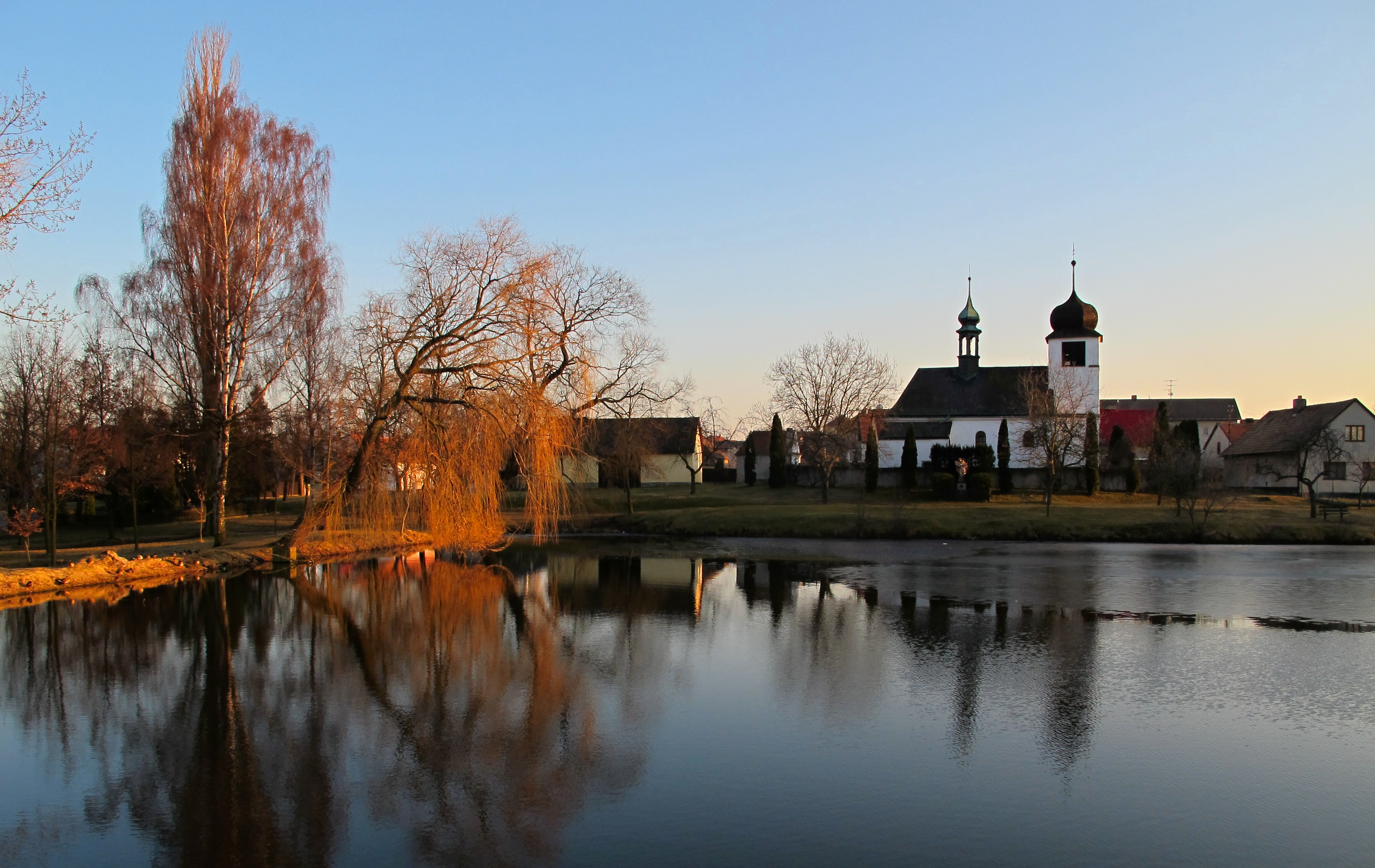
- Church of Saint John the Evangelist

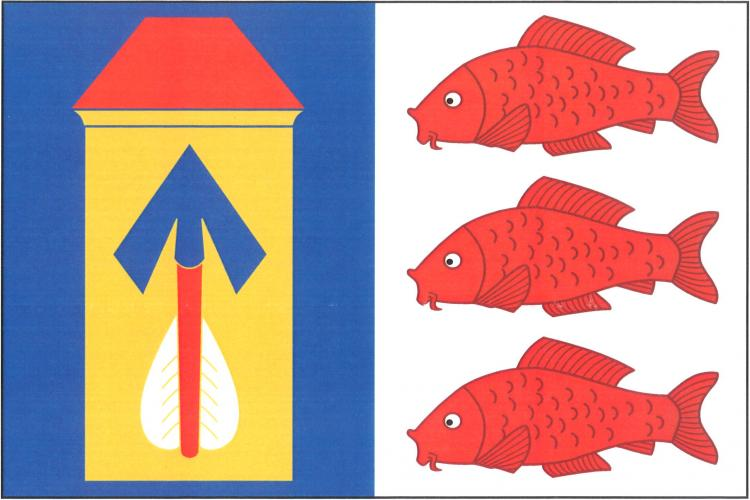
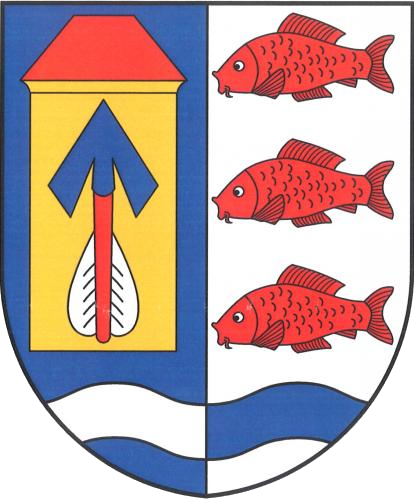
- Flag Coat of arms

- Location in the Czech Republic
- Coordinates: 49°43′16″N 14°7′14″E
- Country: Czech Republic
- Region: Central Bohemian
- District: Příbram
- First mentioned: 1336

Area
  - Total: 7.59 km^{2} (2.93 sq mi)
- Elevation: 425 m (1,394 ft)

Population (2026-01-01)
  - Total: 458
  - Density: 60.3/km^{2} (156/sq mi)
- Time zone: UTC+1 (CET)
  - Summer (DST): UTC+2 (CEST)
- Postal code: 263 01
- Website: www.obec-dlouha-lhota.cz

Dlouhá Lhota is a municipality and village in Příbram District in the Central Bohemian Region of the Czech Republic. It has about 500 inhabitants.

== Etymology ==
The name means 'long Lhota' in Czech.

== Geography ==
Dlouhá Lhota is located about 8 kilometres (5 mi) northeast of Příbram and 38 km (24 mi) southwest of Prague. It lies in the Brdy Highlands. The highest point is the hill Na Vrších at 442 m (1,450 ft) above sea level. The stream Lhotecký potok flows through the municipality and supplies here a system of several small fishponds.

== History ==
The first written mention of Dlouhá Lhota is from 1336. From 1364 to 1654, the village was called Bavorova Lhota after Bavors of Strakonice, who had built here the church.

== Demographics ==
Historical population

Year	Pop.	±%
1869	485	—
1880	522	+7.6%
1890	558	+6.9%
1900	553	−0.9%
1910	474	−14.3%

Year	Pop.	±%
1921	465	−1.9%
1930	481	+3.4%
1950	380	−21.0%
1961	376	−1.1%
1970	333	−11.4%

Year	Pop.	±%
1980	320	−3.9%
1991	279	−12.8%
2001	299	+7.2%
2011	354	+18.4%
2021	441	+24.6%

Source: Censuses

== Transport ==
The D4 motorway from Prague to Písek runs through the municipality.

== Sights ==
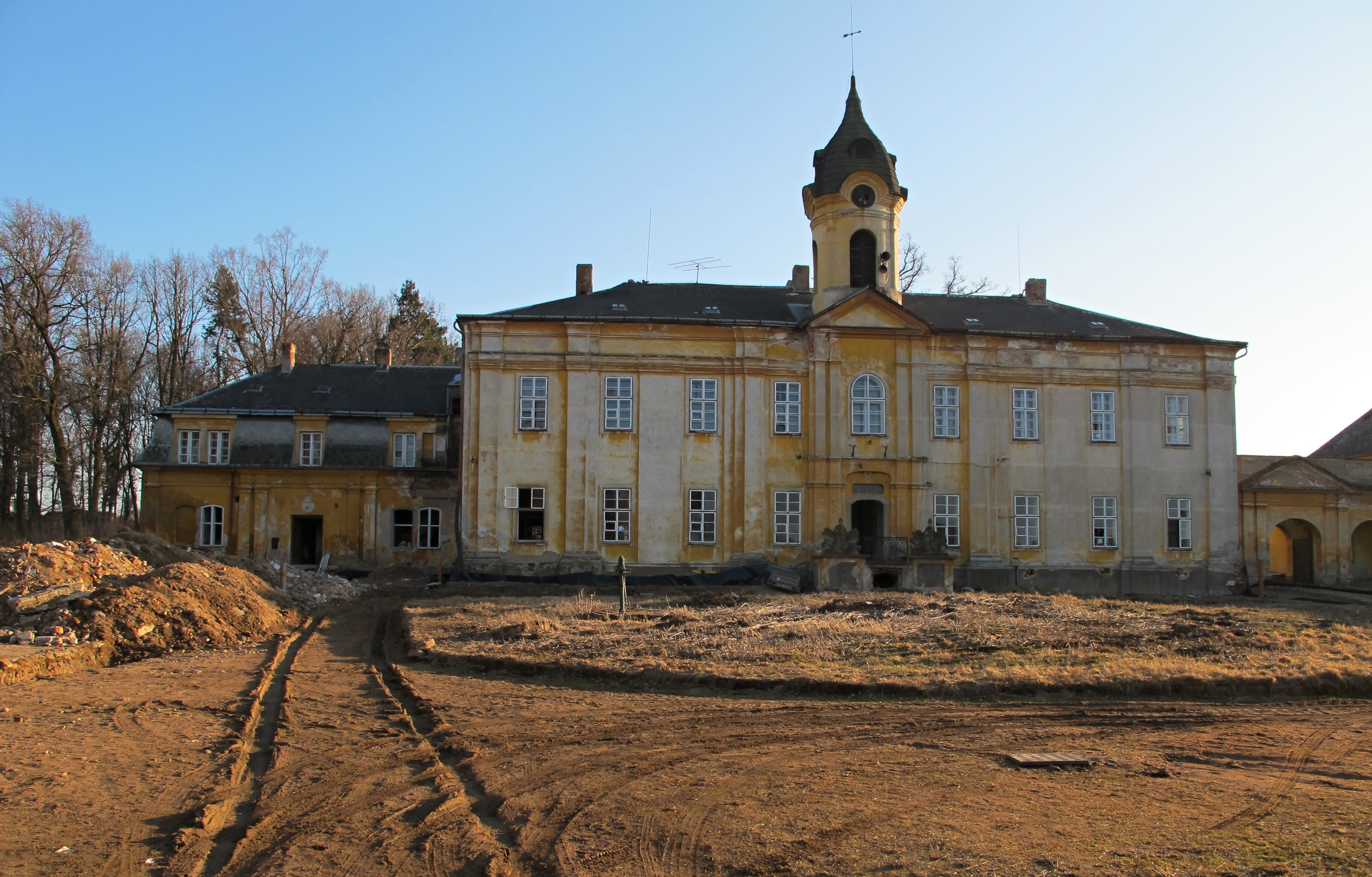
Dlouhá Lhota Castle

The main landmarks of Dlouhá Lhota are the castle and the church. The Church of Saint John the Evangelist was originally a Gothic building, first documented in 1359. At the end of the 16th century, it was modified in Renaissance style. Baroque reconstruction took place in the second half of the 18th century. The church is considered a historically very valuable rural building. Valuable is also the statue of Saint John of Nepomuk from the second half of the 18th century.

The Dlouhá Lhota Castle was built in the early Baroque style in the late 17th century. It was built on the site of a Renaissance fortress, destroyed during the Thirty Years' War. Around 1800, it was completely rebuilt, and further Neoclassical modifications were made during the 19th century. The castle is surrounded by a park. The castle building has no use and is inaccessible.

== Notable people ==
- Lukáš Černohorský (born 1984), politician
