= Dlouhá Lhota (Mladá Boleslav District) =

- Municipality
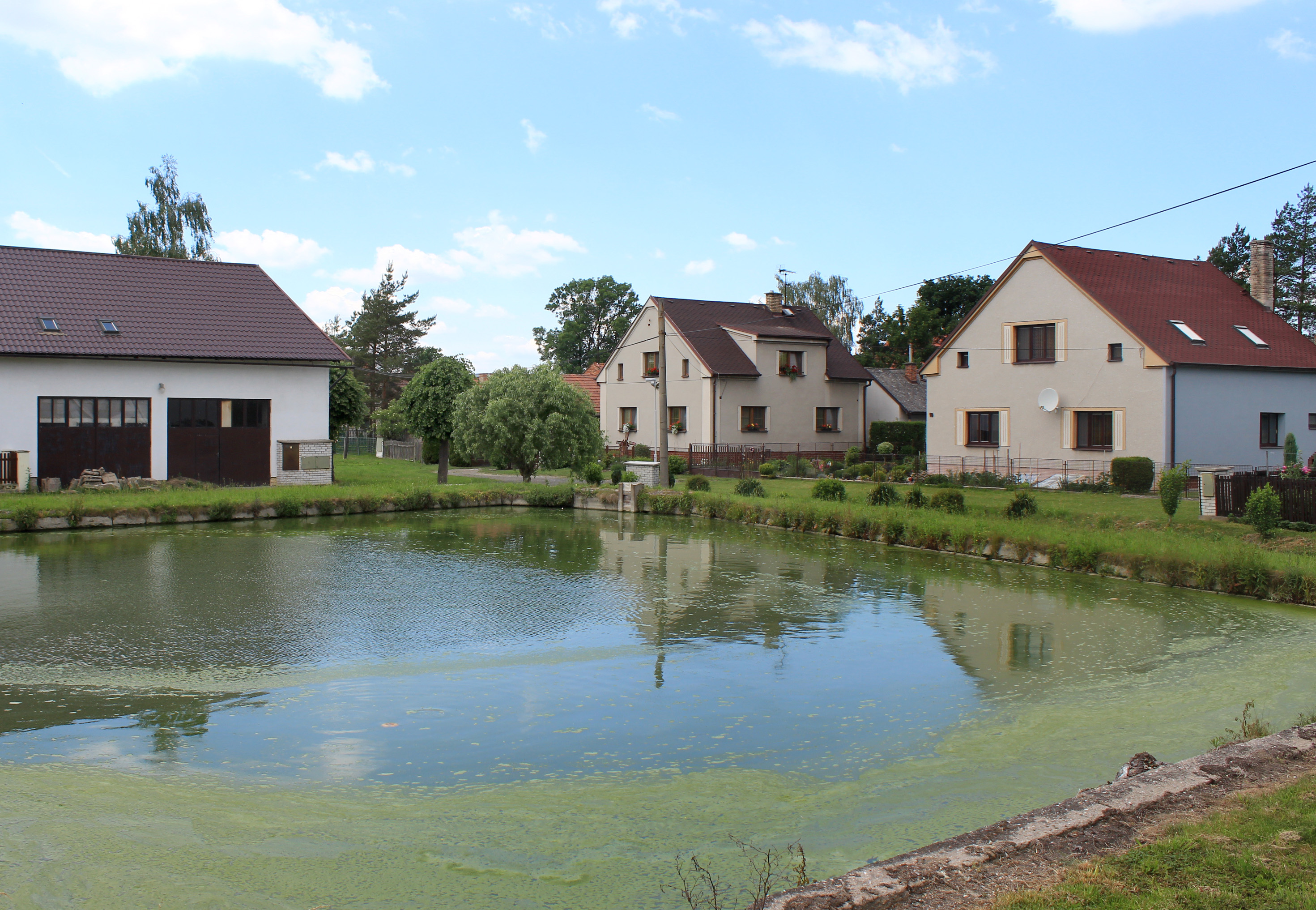
- Common pond

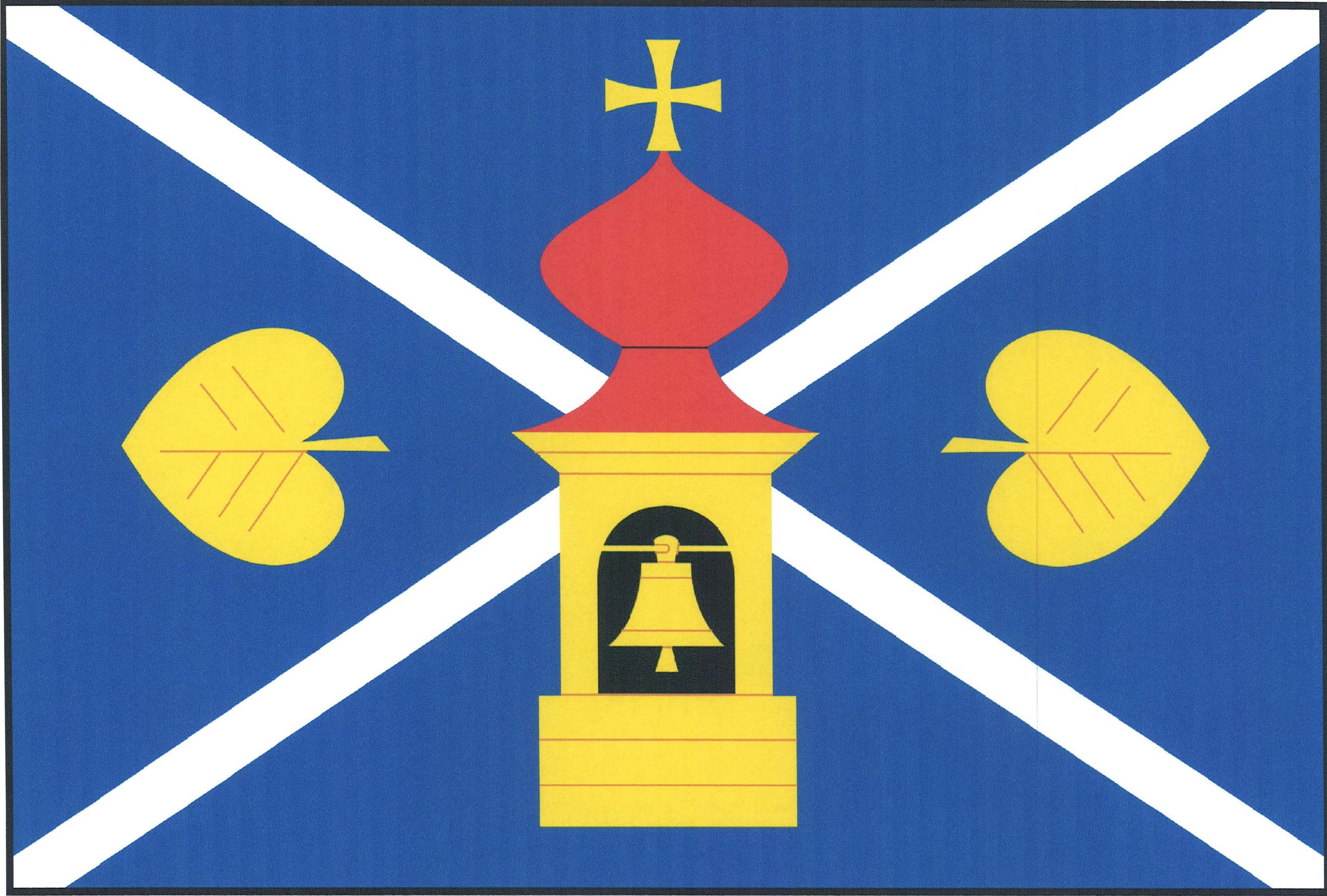
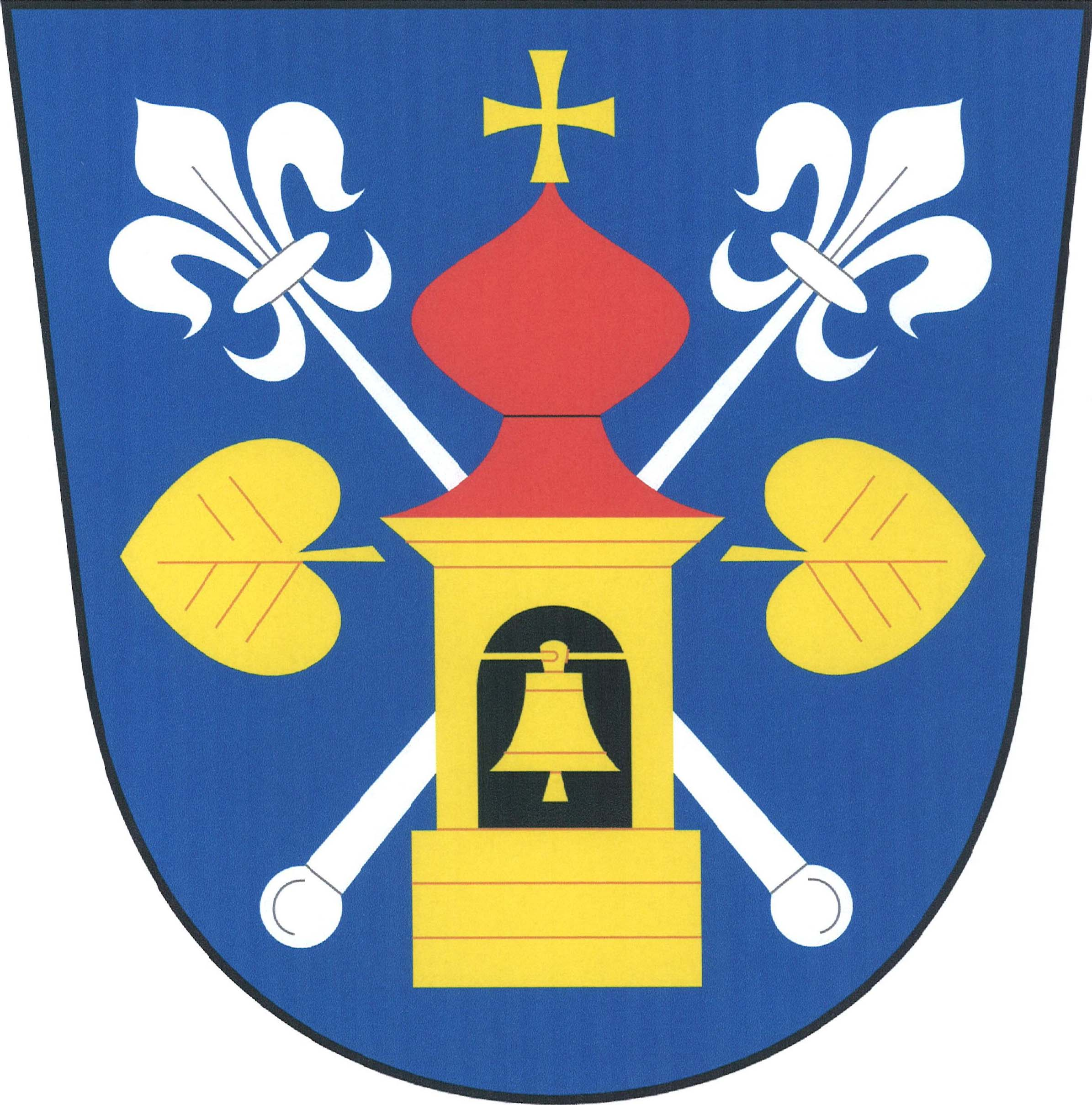
- Flag Coat of arms

- Location in the Czech Republic
- Coordinates: 50°25′13″N 15°3′15″E
- Country: Czech Republic
- Region: Central Bohemian
- District: Mladá Boleslav
- First mentioned: 1383

Area
  - Total: 5.94 km^{2} (2.29 sq mi)
- Elevation: 225 m (738 ft)

Population (2026-01-01)
  - Total: 492
  - Density: 82.8/km^{2} (215/sq mi)
- Time zone: UTC+1 (CET)
  - Summer (DST): UTC+2 (CEST)
- Postal code: 294 05
- Website: www.dlouhalhota.cz

Dlouhá Lhota is a municipality and village in Mladá Boleslav District in the Central Bohemian Region of the Czech Republic. It has about 500 inhabitants.

== Etymology ==
The name means 'long Lhota' in Czech.

== Geography ==
Dlouhá Lhota is located about 9 kilometres (6 mi) east of Mladá Boleslav and 51 km (32 mi) northeast of Prague. It lies in the Jičín Uplands, in a predominantly flat agricultural landscape. The highest point is at 242 m (794 ft) above sea level, located on the southern municipal border. The Klenice River flows through the northern part of the municipal territory. The Vorlík pond is on the edge of the village.

== History ==
The first written mention of Dlouhá Lhota is from 1383. It belonged to the Březno estate and shared its owners and destiny. Until 1416, the estate was owned by the Wartenberg family, then it was sold to Jindřich Waldstein, who soon sold it to lower nobleman Jan Lapáček. After it changed hands twice in the 15th century, it was acquired by Jindřich Hložek of Žampach. He died in 1543 and a year later, the estate was inherited by the Bubna of Litice family. They owned the estate until 1749.

== Demographics ==
Historical population

| Year | Pop. | ±% |
|---|---|---|
| 1869 | 404 | — |
| 1880 | 459 | +13.6% |
| 1890 | 402 | −12.4% |
| 1900 | 374 | −7.0% |
| 1910 | 474 | +26.7% |

| Year | Pop. | ±% |
|---|---|---|
| 1921 | 436 | −8.0% |
| 1930 | 421 | −3.4% |
| 1950 | 342 | −18.8% |
| 1961 | 327 | −4.4% |
| 1970 | 326 | −0.3% |

| Year | Pop. | ±% |
|---|---|---|
| 1980 | 324 | −0.6% |
| 1991 | 305 | −5.9% |
| 2001 | 311 | +2.0% |
| 2011 | 392 | +26.0% |
| 2021 | 450 | +14.8% |

Source: Censuses

== Transport ==
Dlouhá Lhota is located on the railway line Mladá Boleslav–Mladějov.

== Sights ==
A wooden belfry once stood in the municipality, but after its destruction around 1970, no cultural monuments remain.
