= Ivan Bartoš =

Czech activist and politician

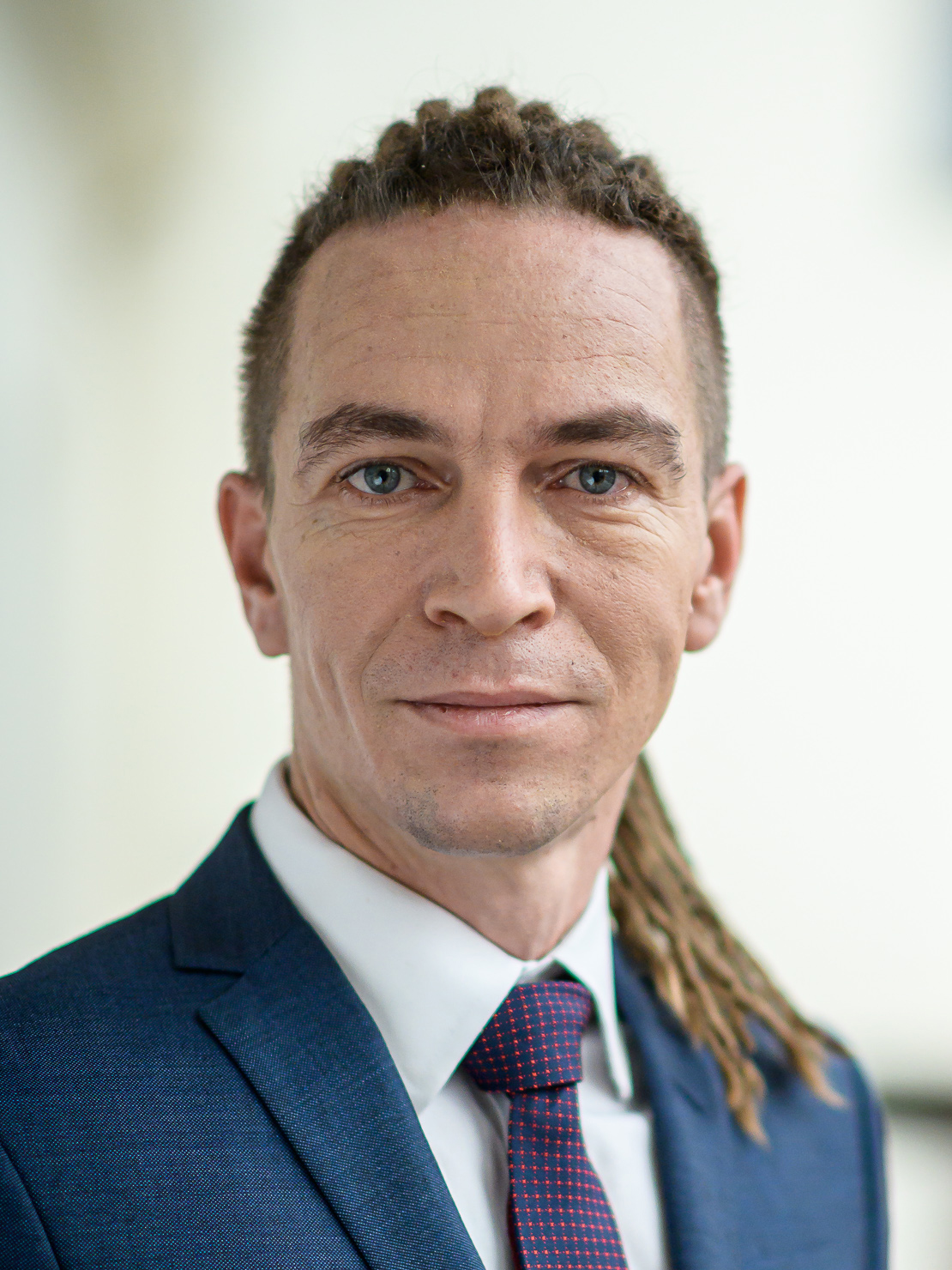
- Bartoš in 2021

Leader of the Czech Pirate Party
- In office 2 April 2016 – 22 September 2024
- Preceded by: Lukáš Černohorský
- Succeeded by: Zdeněk Hřib
- In office 7 October 2013 – 6 June 2014
- Preceded by: Vacant
- Succeeded by: Lukáš Černohorský
- In office 24 October 2009 – 25 June 2013
- Preceded by: Kamil Horký
- Succeeded by: Vacant

Deputy Prime Minister for Digitalization of the Czech Republic
- In office 28 November 2021 – 30 September 2024
- Prime Minister: Petr Fiala

Minister of Regional Development
- In office 28 November 2021 – 30 September 2024
- Prime Minister: Petr Fiala
- Preceded by: Klára Dostálová
- Succeeded by: Marian Jurečka

Member of the Chamber of Deputies
- Incumbent
- Assumed office 21 October 2017

Personal details
- Born: 20 March 1980 (age 46) Jablonec nad Nisou, Czechoslovakia (now the Czech Republic)
- Party: Czech Pirate Party
- Spouse: Lydie Franka Bartošová (m. 2015)
- Education: Charles University
- Website: pirati.cz

Ivan Bartoš (born 20 March 1980) is a Czech civil rights activist and politician for the Czech Pirate Party, who served as the Minister of Regional Development and Deputy Prime Minister for Digitalization in the Cabinet of Petr Fiala from December 2021 to September 2024. He has been a member of the Chamber of Deputies of the Czech Republic since October 2017, and was chairman of the Pirate Party from 2009 to 2014, and again from 2016 to 2024.

== Early life ==
Bartoš was born on 20 March 1980 in Jablonec nad Nisou, an industrial town in northern Bohemia. He studied information studies and librarianship at the Faculty of Arts, Charles University in Prague and participated in a student exchange program at the University of New Orleans. Subsequently, Bartoš worked in the IT industry and was elected chairman of the Pirate Party in October 2009.

== Political career ==
=== Leader of the Pirate Party ===
Bartoš led the party into its first national elections in 2010, with the Pirates receiving 0.8% of the vote and therefore no representation in the Chamber of Deputies.

Bartoš was the party's leading candidate again in legislative elections in 2013. The party won 2.66% of the vote, not reaching the 5% electoral threshold. Bartoš was the Pirates' leading candidate for the 2014 European Parliament election, but the party missed the 5% electoral threshold, receiving 4.78% of the vote. In June 2014, Bartoš resigned as party leader. After the party's poor results in the 2024 European Parliament election and 2024 regional elections, Bartoš resigned as party leader on 22 September 2024.

=== Chamber of Deputies ===
Bartoš was elected party chairman again in 2016 and led the Pirates into the 2017 legislative elections, taking 10.8% of the national vote to become the third largest party in the Chamber of Deputies, with 22 out of 200 seats. He served as the chairman of the Committee on Public Administration and Regional Development from November 2017 until November 2021.

Bartoš was re-elected as party leader in 2018 and led the party's campaign for the 2018 local elections, where the leading Pirate candidate in Prague, Zdeněk Hřib, was elected Mayor of Prague. In 2019, Bartoš campaigned for the European Parliament election in support of the Pirate Party list and lead candidate Marcel Kolaja. The party gained 13.95% of the vote and entered the European Parliament with three MEPs.

=== In government ===
Bartoš was re-elected as party leader in January 2020. The same year in December, he became the lead candidate of the electoral coalition of the Pirate Party and Mayors and Independents (STAN) for the 2021 Czech legislative election and was re-elected. Subsequently, Bartoš was nominated to serve as the Minister of Regional Development and Deputy Prime Minister for Digitalization in the Cabinet of Petr Fiala.

From February 2024, Bartoš was the subject of criticism from experts in the construction industry over his management of the upcoming digitalized system for managing construction permits, due to start in July 2024. Critics also alleged violations of laws in public procurement, but Bartoš consistently rejected all criticism as groundless. From July 2024, when the failure of the new system became apparent, Bartoš received heavy criticism from construction authority officials, architects, representatives of the Union of Cities and Municipalities, and opposition politicians. Prime Minister Petr Fiala announced on 24 September 2024 that he would propose to dismiss Bartoš as a minister on 30 September 2024, stating that Bartoš could not manage the digitization process. President Petr Pavel accepted Fiala's proposal to dismiss him.

== Personal life and views ==
Bartoš is a member of the Czechoslovak Hussite Church, and has been married since 2015. He has supported anti-fascist events and is a pacifist. Bartoš participates in "do it yourself" culture, plays accordion, and played church organ during his youth.
