= 2021 Czech parliamentary election =

- 8–9 October 2021

All 200 seats in the Chamber of Deputies 101 seats needed for a majority
- Opinion polls
- Turnout: 65.39% (▲4.60 pp)
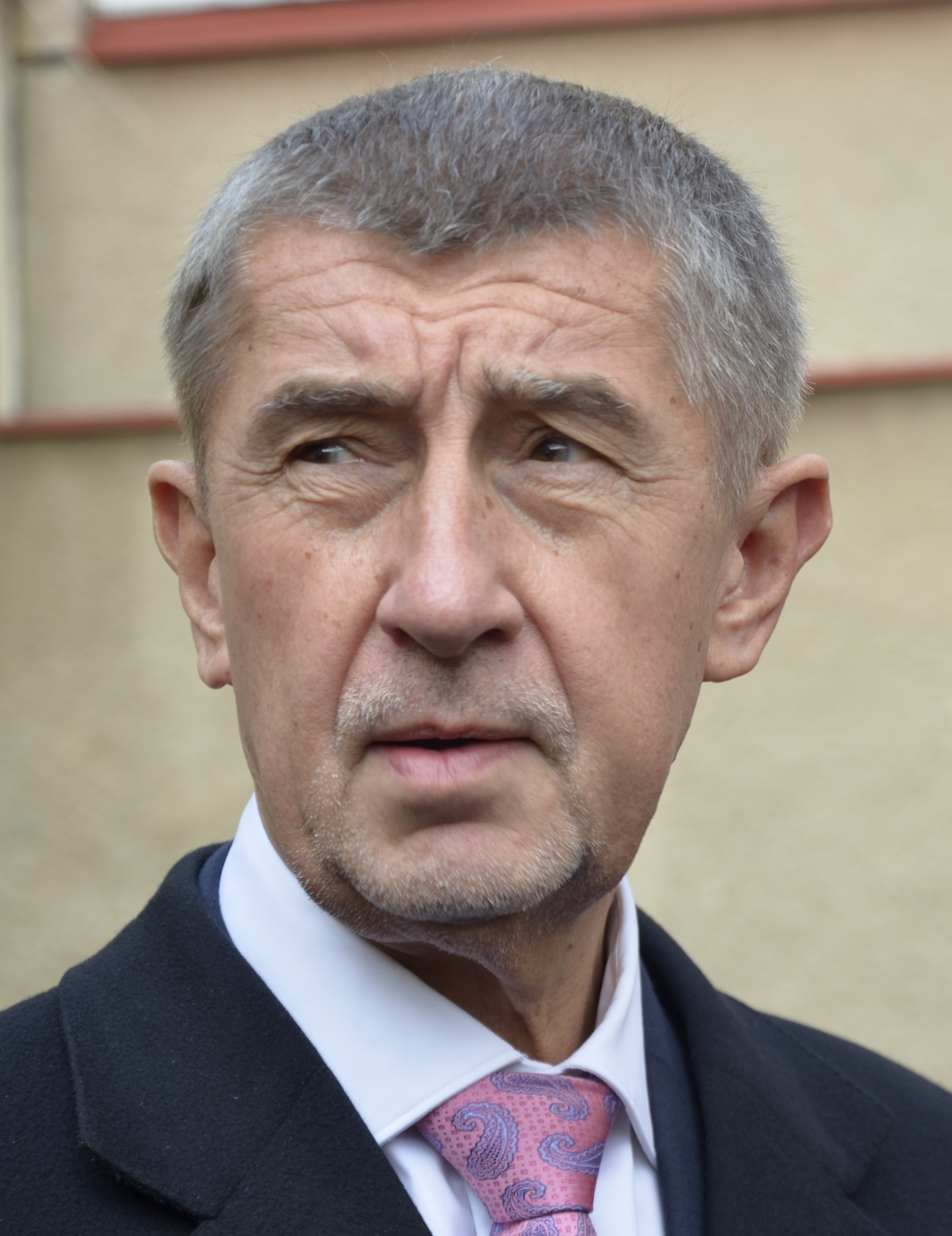

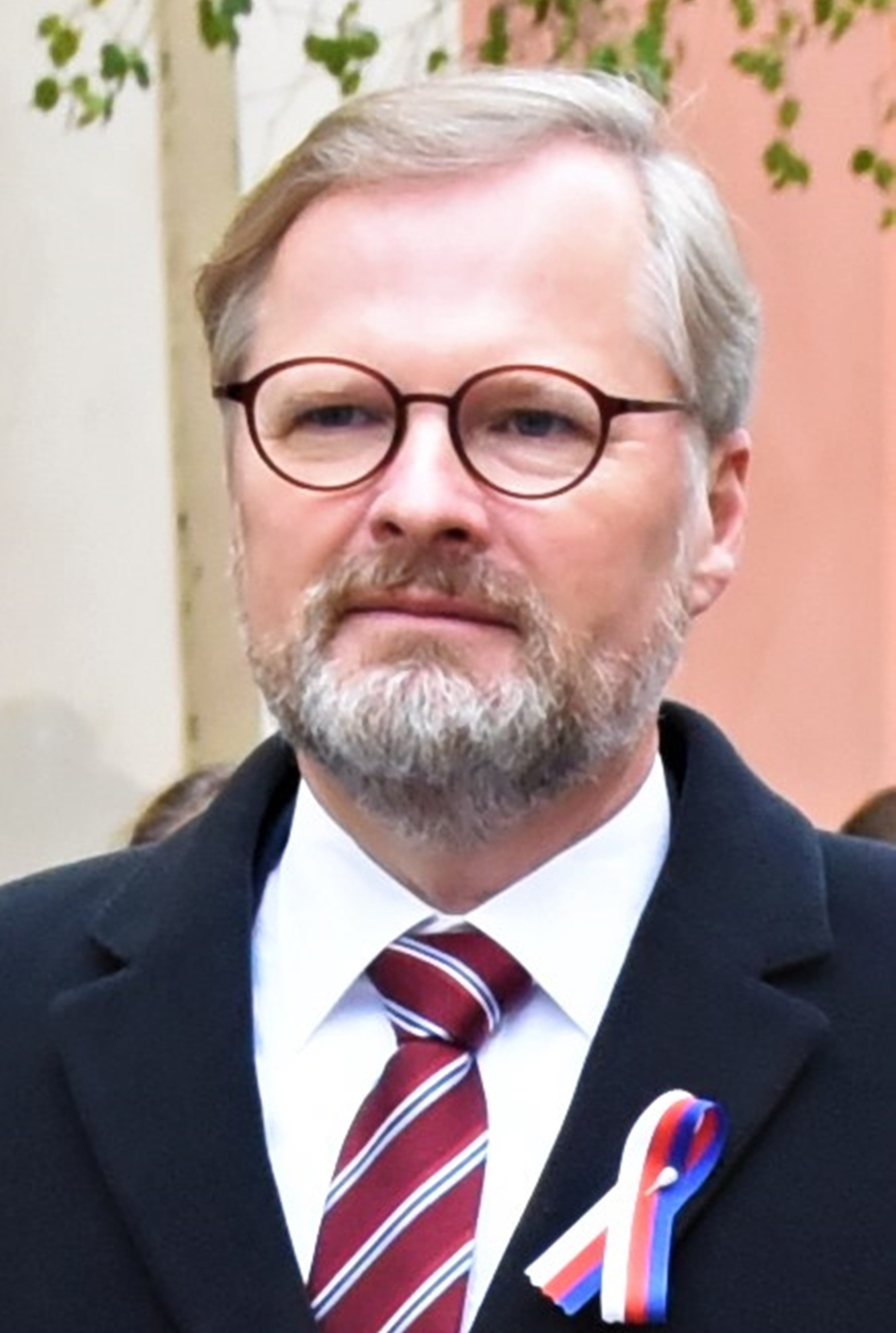

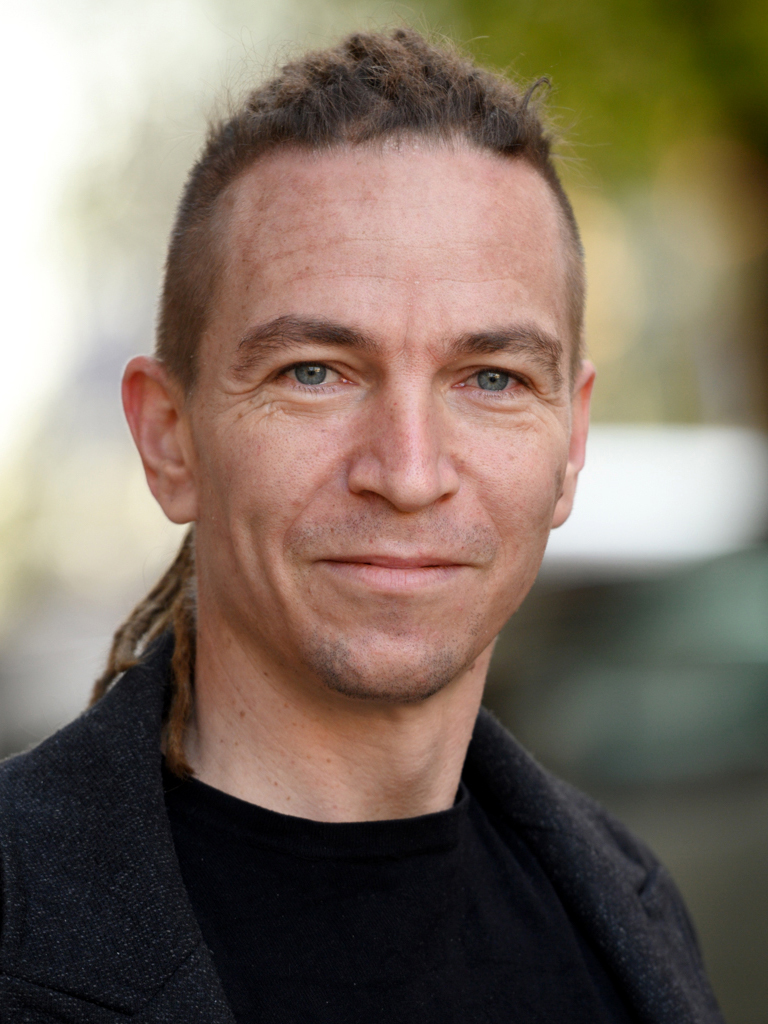

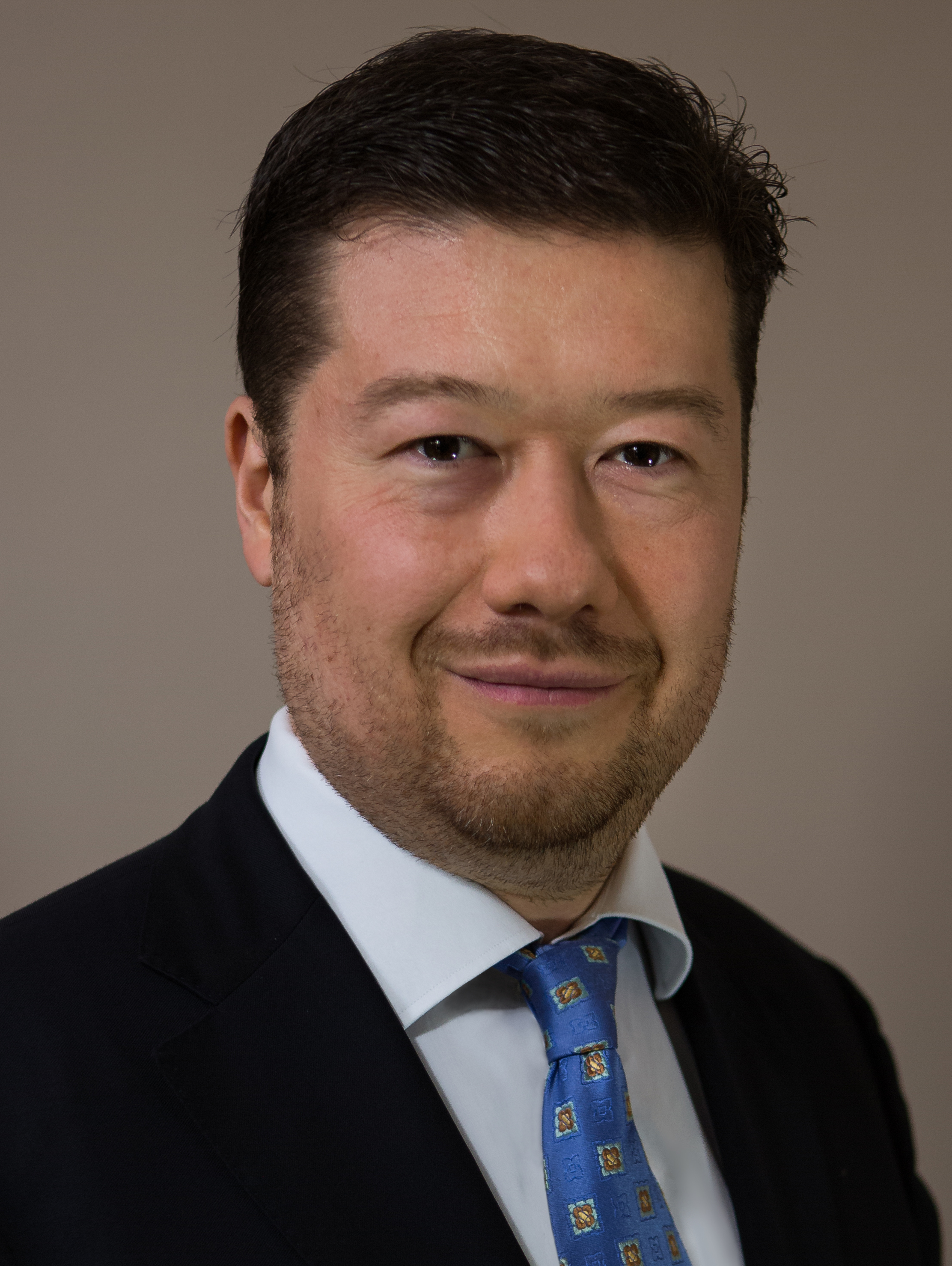
	First party	Second party
Leader	Andrej Babiš	Petr Fiala
Party	ANO	ODS
Alliance	–	SPOLU
Last election	29.64%, 78 seats	22.44%, 42 seats
Seats won	72	71 (Note: ODS 34, KDU–ČSL 23, TOP 09 14)
Seat change	▼6	▲29
Popular vote	1,458,140	1,493,905
Percentage	27.13%	27.79%
Swing	▼2.51pp	▲5.35pp
	Third party	Fourth party
Leader	Ivan Bartoš	Tomio Okamura
Party	Pirates	SPD
Alliance	Pirates and Mayors	–
Last election	15.98%, 28 seats	10.64%, 22 seats
Seats won	37 (Note: STAN 33, Pirates 4)	20
Seat change	▲9	▼2
Popular vote	839,776	513,910
Percentage	15.62%	9.56%
Swing	▼0.36pp	▼1.08pp
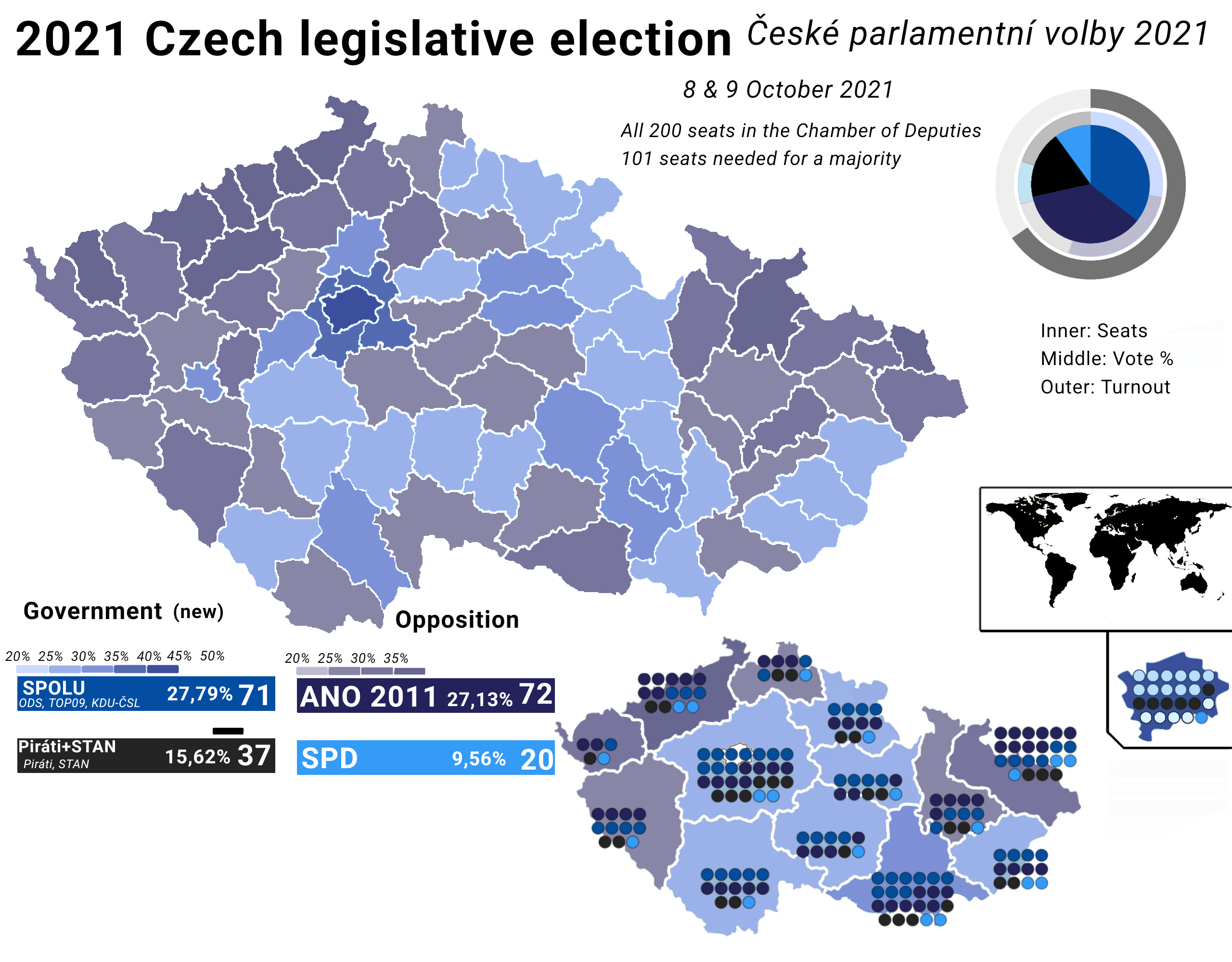
Prime Minister before election
Andrej Babiš
ANO
Prime Minister after election
Petr Fiala
Civic Democratic Party (Czech Republic)

Parliamentary elections were held in the Czech Republic on 8 and 9 October 2021. All 200 members of the Chamber of Deputies were elected, with the leader of the resulting government to become the Prime Minister of the Czech Republic. Following the 2017 parliamentary elections, the country had been ruled by a minority government consisting of ANO, led by prime minister Andrej Babiš, and the Czech Social Democratic Party (ČSSD), led by interior minister Jan Hamáček, with confidence and supply support from the Communist Party of Bohemia and Moravia (KSČM) until April 2021. The largest opposition party was the Civic Democratic Party (ODS), followed by the Czech Pirate Party. Other parties in the Chamber of Deputies included SPD, TOP 09, STAN, and KDU-ČSL.

Babiš ran again as leader of ANO, and the main opposition parliamentary parties formed two electoral alliances, SPOLU and Pirates and Mayors (abbreviated to PirStan or PaS). ANO was front runner of the election, as it was polling first ahead of SPOLU and PirStan prior to the election. The result was a surprise victory for the liberal conservative alliance SPOLU, which received the highest number of votes, while the populist ANO received the highest number of seats. No opinion poll placed Spolu in the first place prior to the vote. It was the closest parliamentary election in the history of Czech Republic.

The opposition parties won a majority in the Chamber of Deputies and agreed to form a coalition government with SPOLU leader Petr Fiala as the new prime minister. Traditional left-wing parties ČSSD and KSČM failed to reach the 5% threshold to win any seats in the Chamber of Deputies for the first time since the dissolution of Czechoslovakia in 1993. The Pirates, which were one of the leading opposition parties, were heavily defeated due to preferential votes and won just 4 seats in the Chamber of Deputies. Petr Fiala was appointed as the new prime minister on 28 November 2021 while rest of the new cabinet was appointed on 17 December 2021.

== Background ==
According to the Constitution of the Czech Republic, an election to the Chamber of Deputies, the lower house of the Czech parliament, must be held every four years. The government is answerable to the Chamber of Deputies and remains in power only with the confidence of the majority of members of parliament. Article 19(1) of the constitution states that any citizen of the Czech Republic who has right to vote and is 21 years old is eligible to serve as an MP.

ANO emerged as the largest party in the 2017 parliamentary election and formed a minority government, which then lost a vote of confidence on 16 January 2018. The party formed a coalition government with the Czech Social Democratic Party (ČSSD), supported by the Communist Party of Bohemia and Moravia (KSČM), which lasted until April 2021. Andrej Babiš became the new prime minister. The Civic Democratic Party (ODS) emerged as the second largest party and main opposition party, narrowly ahead of the Czech Pirate Party.

=== 2018 Senate and municipal elections ===
In 2018, voters elected 27 of 81 members of the Senate and approximately 61,900 members of local councils. ODS won the Senate election with 10 senators elected. ANO won the municipal elections in most regional cities, with ODS finishing first in Prague and STAN in Liberec. ČSSD and KSČM lost over half of their votes and seats in municipal councils.

=== 2019 European Parliament election ===
In May 2019, voters elected 21 members of the European Parliament. ANO came first, with ODS and the Pirates close behind in number of seats. As ČSSD failed to achieve more than 5 percent of votes in national elections for the first time since the mid-1990s, it did not get any seat.

=== 2020 Senate and regional elections ===
In October 2020, voters elected 675 members of regional assemblies in 13 regions of the nation, except Prague, which then formed regional governments. ANO won the election with 21.8% of votes but opposition parties, especially the Pirates, made gains, while allies of ANO were heavily defeated. The governing parties were also heavily defeated in the Senate elections, which were won by Mayors and Independents ahead of ODS.

=== Coalitions of political parties ===
Following these elections, opposition parties began negotiations about potential electoral alliances. It was speculated that two electoral blocs would be formed: a conservative bloc led by ODS, which would also include KDU-ČSL and TOP 09, with Petr Fiala as leader, and a liberal bloc composed of the Pirates and Mayors and Independents, with Ivan Bartoš as the leader.

The ODS leadership agreed to form an alliance on 25 October 2020, with a memorandum to be signed two days later. On 27 October 2020, Fiala, Marian Jurečka, and Markéta Pekarová Adamová announced that ODS, KDU-ČSL, and TOP 09 would form an electoral alliance for the next parliamentary election, with ODS leader Fiala as the alliance's candidate for prime minister. On 11 November 2020, the parties agreed that ODS would nominate the leaders of the election lists in nine regions, KDU-ČSL in three regions, and TOP 09 in two regions. The name of the alliance was announced as SPOLU, meaning "Together" in English. Fiala was confirmed as the alliance's candidate for prime minister on 16 December 2020.

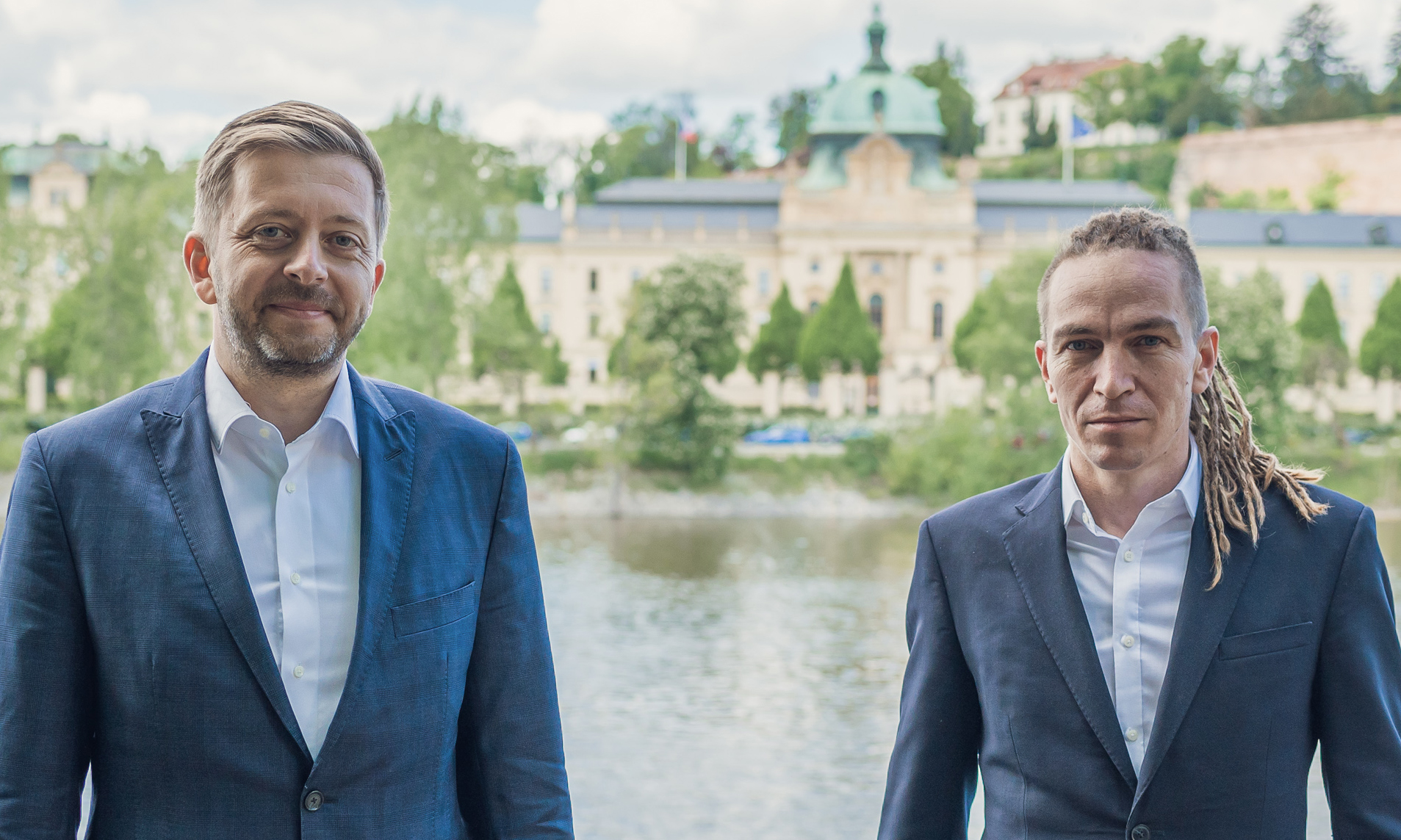
Vít Rakušan and Ivan Bartoš, leaders of Pirates and Mayors.

The leadership of Mayors and Independents agreed to start negotiations on 8 October 2020. The Pirates are required to ratify any alliance in a members' referendum. In a poll on 20 October 2020, 51% of Pirate members were opposed to the alliance while 43% supported it. The referendum to starting negotiations for an alliance was originally scheduled for 13 to 16 November 2020 but was rescheduled for 20 to 23 November 2020. Among Pirate members, 695 out of 858 voted in favour of negotiations, with a turnout of 80%. Ivan Bartoš was nominated to be the Pirate's election leader on 25 November 2020, and was confirmed on 2 December 2020. The Pirates also offered the Green Party the possibility to join its electoral list. Bartoš was confirmed as the alliance's electoral leader on 14 December 2020. Pirate members voted to approve the alliance on 13 January 2021.

ČSSD started to negotiate the formation of a third electoral bloc in January 2021, negotiating with the Green Party and some regional parties about the formation of a left-wing electoral alliance. The Green Party stated as a condition for joining an alliance that the parties would not form a government coalition with ANO after the election.

In early 2021, the Tricolour Citizens' Movement, Svobodní, the Freeholder Party of the Czech Republic, and other minor parties began negotiations about a potential alliance. On 5 March 2021, these three parties confirmed the formation of a coalition, stating that they would run either in a formal electoral alliance or as a single party, depending on the new electoral law. The Independence Party of the Czech Republic declared support for this coalition soon after. On 23 March 2021, Tricolour leader Václav Klaus Jr. resigned from all political functions for personal reasons. Zuzana Majerová Zahradníková became acting leader of the party.

On 23 March 2021, a group of minor parties including the Alliance for the Future, Agrarian Democratic Party, Order of the Nation, and Democratic Green Party formed an electoral alliance, the Alliance for the Future, with Pavel Sehnal as leader. The Party of Common Sense also subsequently joined the alliance.

Some commentators have described the election as a "hidden referendum" on membership of the European Union (EU).

== Electoral system ==
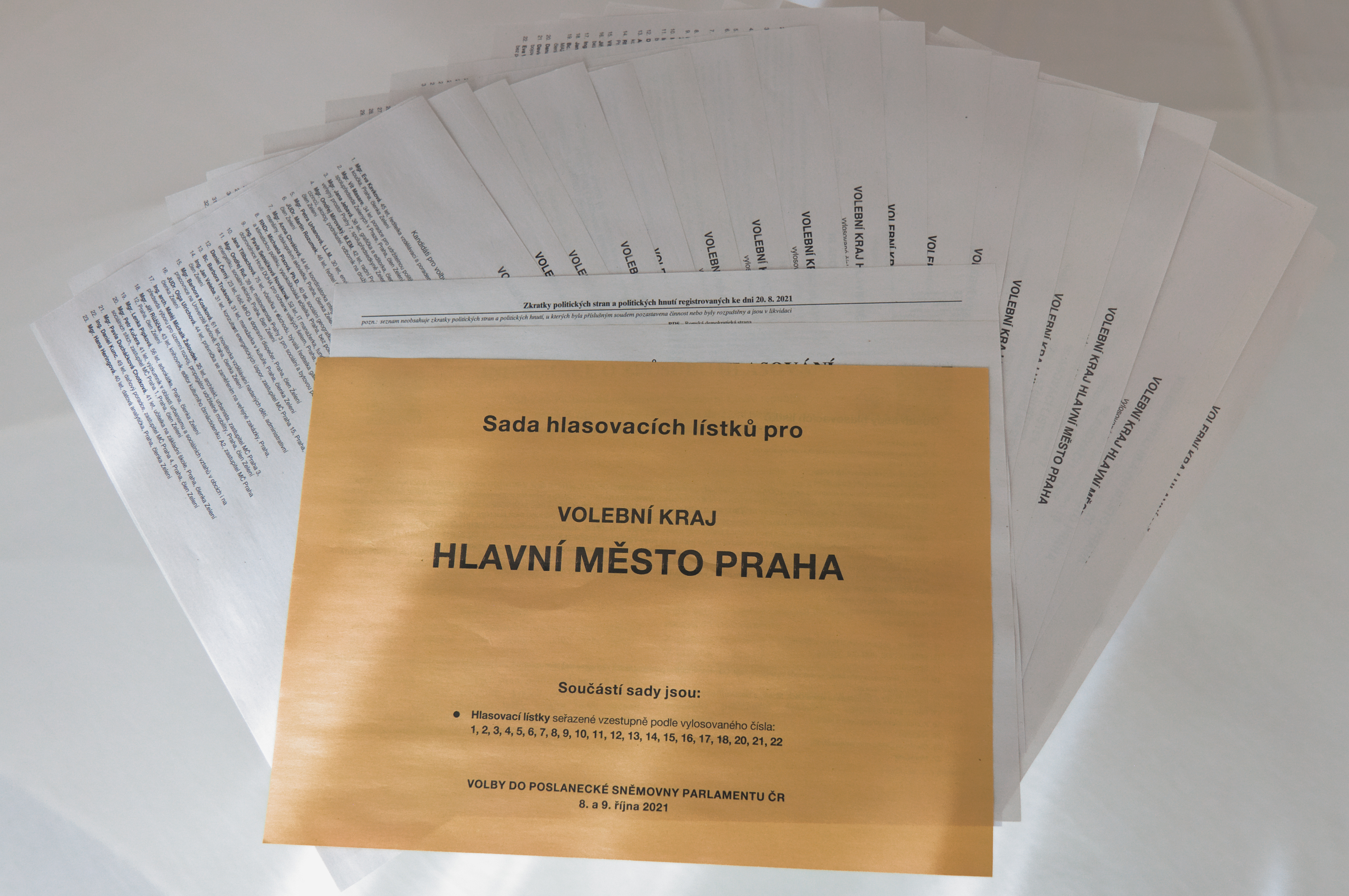
Set of ballots for the 2021 parliamentary elections for the Prague voting district

During the 2017 parliamentary election, the 200 members of the Chamber of Deputies were elected from 14 multi-member constituencies by open list proportional representation with an electoral threshold of 5%. It was raised to 10% for two-party political alliances, 15% for three-party alliances, and 20% for alliances of four or more parties. Seats were allocated using the D'Hondt method. Voters can give preference votes to up to four candidates on a list. Candidates who receive preferential votes from more than 5% of voters are moved to the top of their list; in cases where more than one candidate receives over 5% of the preferential votes, they are ranked in order of votes received.

Although it was expected that the 2021 parliamentary election would take place using the same electoral system, the Constitutional Court ruled on a complaint submitted by a group of senators from Mayors and Independents, KDU-ČSL, and TOP 09 that the electoral system was unproportional and favoured larger parties. It focused on the D'Hondt method, the division of the country into 14 constituencies, and the increased electoral threshold for alliances. The Constitutional Court's decision, published on 3 February 2021, set the threshold for alliances at 5% and removed some provisions relating to seat allocation. New provisions were put into law before the election, establishing a threshold of 5% for single parties, 8% for coalitions of two parties, and 11% for coalitions of three or more parties.

=== Registration process ===
The deadline to submit candidate lists for election was 4 August 2021. As of 2 August 2021, 29 subjects had made an application to the registration bureau. All of them were approved by the bureau and permitted to run.

=== Observers ===
Czech Republic invited experts from Organization for Security and Co-operation in Europe (OSCE) and Office for Democratic Institutions and Human Rights (ODIHR) to observe election. OSCE provided four observers.

=== Covid-19 pandemic ===
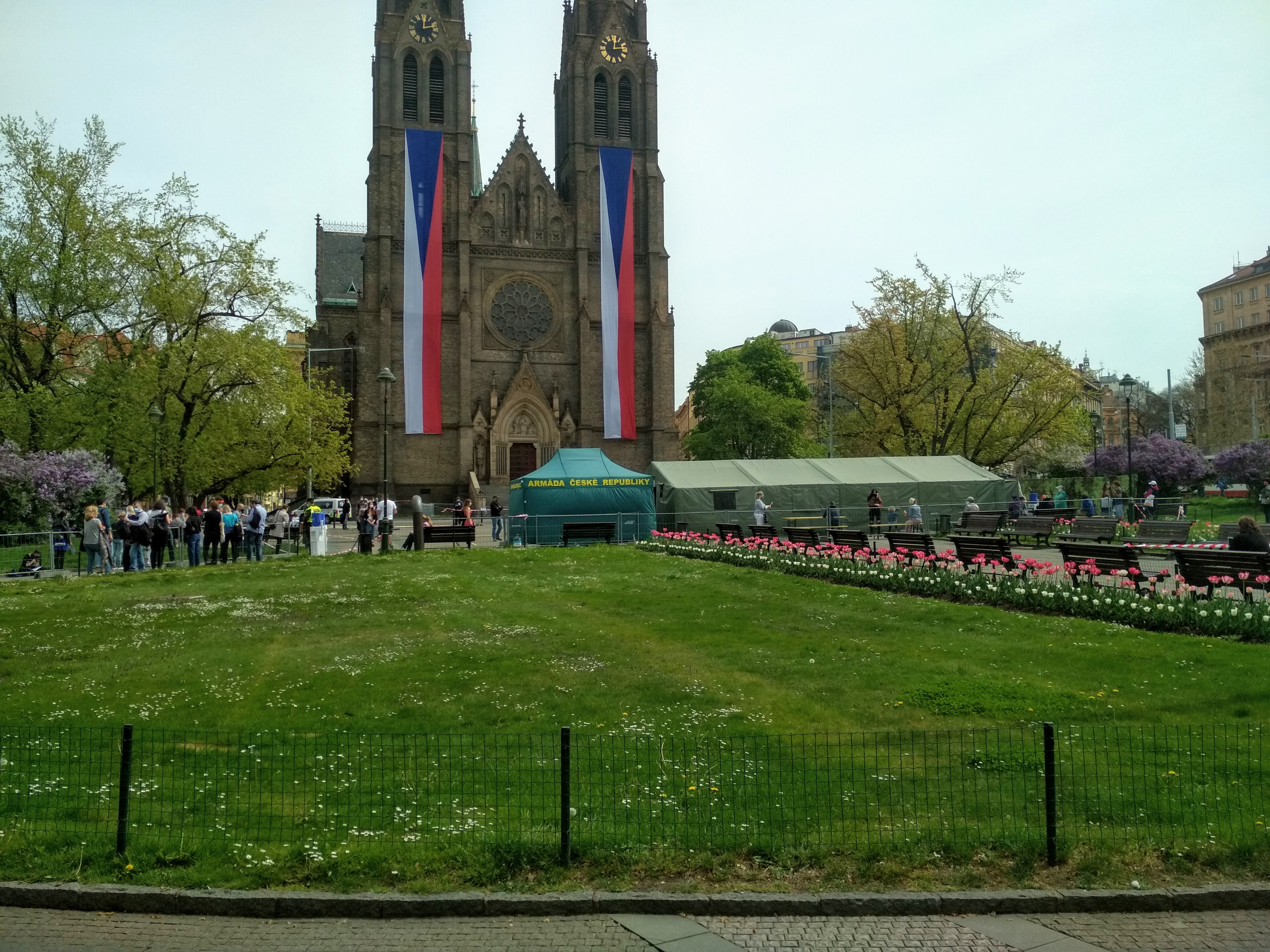
COVID-19 testing site in Prague. COVID-19 affected the election with some changes required to allow quarantined and isolated people to vote.

As with the regional elections in 2020, the pandemic emergency, covered by the pandemic law, allowed for the establishment of special polling stations for people in isolation or quarantine, as well as drive-in voting locations. Disinfection and respiratory protection were provided to ensure hygienic conditions in traditional polling stations. Special election dates were announced on 6 and 7 October 2021.

=== Local referendums ===
Simultaneously with the election, there were local referendums held in 20 cities and towns: Blšany u Loun, Blučina, Bzenec, Dačice, Drnholec, Jáchymov, Jezeřany-Maršovice, Katovice, Losiná, Pardubice, Podolí, Příkosice, Řevnice, Slavonice, Sušice, Ševětín, Temelín, Třemošnice, Velký Beranov, Zduchovice and Stará Bělá (part of Ostrava).

=== Political parties ===
The table below lists political parties represented in the Chamber of Deputies after the 2017 parliamentary election.

Name	Ideology	Position	Leader	2017 result	
Name	Ideology	Position	Leader	Votes (%)	Seats
ANO	Populism	Centre to centre-right	Andrej Babiš	29.6%	78 / 200
ODS	Liberal conservatism	Centre-right to right-wing	Petr Fiala	11.3%	25 / 200
Pirates	Pirate politics	Centre to centre-left	Ivan Bartoš	10.8%	22 / 200
SPD	Right-wing populism	Right-wing to far-right	Tomio Okamura	10.6%	22 / 200
KSČM	Communism	Left-wing to far-left	Vojtěch Filip	7.8%	15 / 200
ČSSD	Social democracy	Centre-left	Jan Hamáček	7.3%	15 / 200
KDU-ČSL	Christian democracy	Centre to centre-right	Marian Jurečka	5.8%	10 / 200
TOP 09	Liberal conservatism	Centre-right	Markéta Adamová	5.3%	7 / 200
STAN	Liberalism, localism	Centre to centre-right	Vít Rakušan	5.2%	6 / 200

=== Pre-election composition ===
Party	Seats
ANO	78
Civic Democratic Party	23
Czech Pirate Party	22
Freedom and Direct Democracy	19
Communist Party of Bohemia and Moravia	15
Czech Social Democratic Party	14
KDU-ČSL	10
TOP 09	7
Mayors and Independents	6
Tricolour Citizens' Movement	3
Free Bloc	2
Unified	1

=== Competing parties ===
List	Name	Ideology	Position	Leader	2017 result
1	Green Party	Green politics	Centre-left	Magdalena Davis	1.56% (0 Seats)
2	Swiss Democracy	Swiss system	Centre-right	Tomáš Raždík	new
3	Free Bloc	Nationalism	Far-right	Lubomír Volný	didn't stand
4	Freedom and Direct Democracy	Right-wing populism	Far-right	Tomio Okamura	10.64% (22 Seats)
5	Czech Social Democratic Party	Social democracy	Centre-left	Jan Hamáček	7.27% (15 Seats)
6	Right Bloc	Anti-communism	Right-wing	Petr Cibulka	0% (0 Seats)
7	Alliance of National Forces	Nationalism	Far-right	Vladimíra Vítová	0% (0 Seats)
8	Tricolour–Svobodní–Soukromníci	National conservatism	Right-wing to far-right	Zuzana Majerová Zahradníková	1.56% (0 Seats)
9	Alliance for the Future	Liberalism	Centre-right	Pavel Sehnal	0.15% (0 Seats)
10	Sources Movement	Decentralization	none	no leader	new
11	The Left	Democratic socialism	Left-wing	Markéta Juřicová	new
12	Přísaha	Populism	Centre to centre-right	Robert Šlachta	new
13	SPOLU	Liberal conservatism	Centre-right	Petr Fiala	22.4% (42 Seats)
14	Seniors 21	Pensioners' interests	none	Jaromír Fojtík	new
15	Urza.cz	Anarcho-capitalism	none	Martin Urza	new
16	Czech Crown	Monarchism	Right-wing	Radim Špaček	supported TOP 09
17	Pirates and Mayors	Liberalism	Centre	Ivan Bartoš	15.97% (28 Seats)
18	Communist Party of Bohemia and Moravia	Communism	Left-wing to far-left	Vojtěch Filip	7.76% (15 Seats)
19	Moravian Land Movement	Regionalism	Centre	Ondřej Hýsek	new
20	ANO	Populism	Centre to centre-right	Andrej Babiš	29.64% (78 Seats)
21	We Will Open Czechia	Opposition to COVID-19 restrictions	Far-right	Jakub Olbert	new
22	Moravané	Regionalism	Centre	Pavel Dohnal	didn't stand

=== MPs not standing for reelection ===
List of MPs who announced they would not stand for reelection in 2021
MP	Seat	First elected	Party	Note
Jiří Bláha	Liberec	2017	ANO	
Alexander Černý	Olomouc	2002	KSČM	
Monika Červíčková	Prague	2018 (surrogate)	ANO	
Jan Čižinský	Prague	2017	KDU-ČSL	
Petr Dolínek	Prague	2017	ČSSD	
Miroslav Grebeníček	South Moravia	1993	KSČM	
Stanislav Juránek	South Moravia	2017	KDU-ČSL	
Pavel Juříček	Moravia-Silesia	2017	ANO	
Iva Kalátová	Karlovy Vary	2019 (surrogate)	ANO	
Václav Klaus Jr.	Prague	2017	Tricolour	Elected for ODS originally.
Jiří Kohoutek	Pardubice	2017	SPD	
Josef Kott	Vysočina	2013	ANO	
Pavel Kováčik	South Moravia	1996	KSČM	
Lenka Kozlová	Central Bohemia	2017	Piráti	The only Pirate MP to not seek reelection.
Jana Levová	Plzeň	2017	SPD	
Přemysl Mališ	Central Bohemia	2017	ANO	
Eva Matyášová	Hradec Králové	2017	ANO	
Marcela Melková	Central Bohemia	2017	ANO	
Jiří Mihola	South Moravia	2013	KDU-ČSL	
Ivana Nevludová	Moravia-Silesia	2017	Jednotní	Originally elected for SPD.
Monika Oborná	Vysočina	2017	ANO	
Petr Pávek	Liberec	2017	STAN	The only STAN MP to not seek reelection.
Pavel Pustějovský	Zlín	2017	ANO	
Jaroslava Puntová	Ústí nad Labem	2020 (surrogate)	ANO	
Miloslava Rutová	Plzeň	2016 (surrogate)	ANO	
Karel Schwarzenberg	Prague	2010	TOP 09	
Roman Sklenák	South Moravia	2010	ČSSD	
Olga Sommerová	Prague	2021 (surrogate)	LES	Elected on TOP 09 list.
Pavel Staněk	South Moravia	2017	ANO	
Pavel Šindelář	Plzeň	2021 (surrogate)	ODS	
Karla Šlechtová	Plzeň	2017	ANO	
František Vácha	South Bohemia	2013	TOP 09	
Adam Vojtěch	South Bohemia	2017	ANO	
Václav Votava	Plzeň	2002	ČSSD	
Jaroslav Vymazal	Vysočina	2020 (surrogate)	ODS	
Rostislav Vyzula	South Moravia	2013	ANO	
Jan Zahradník	South Bohemia	2013	ODS	
Radek Zlesák	Vysočina	2017	ANO	

== Campaign ==
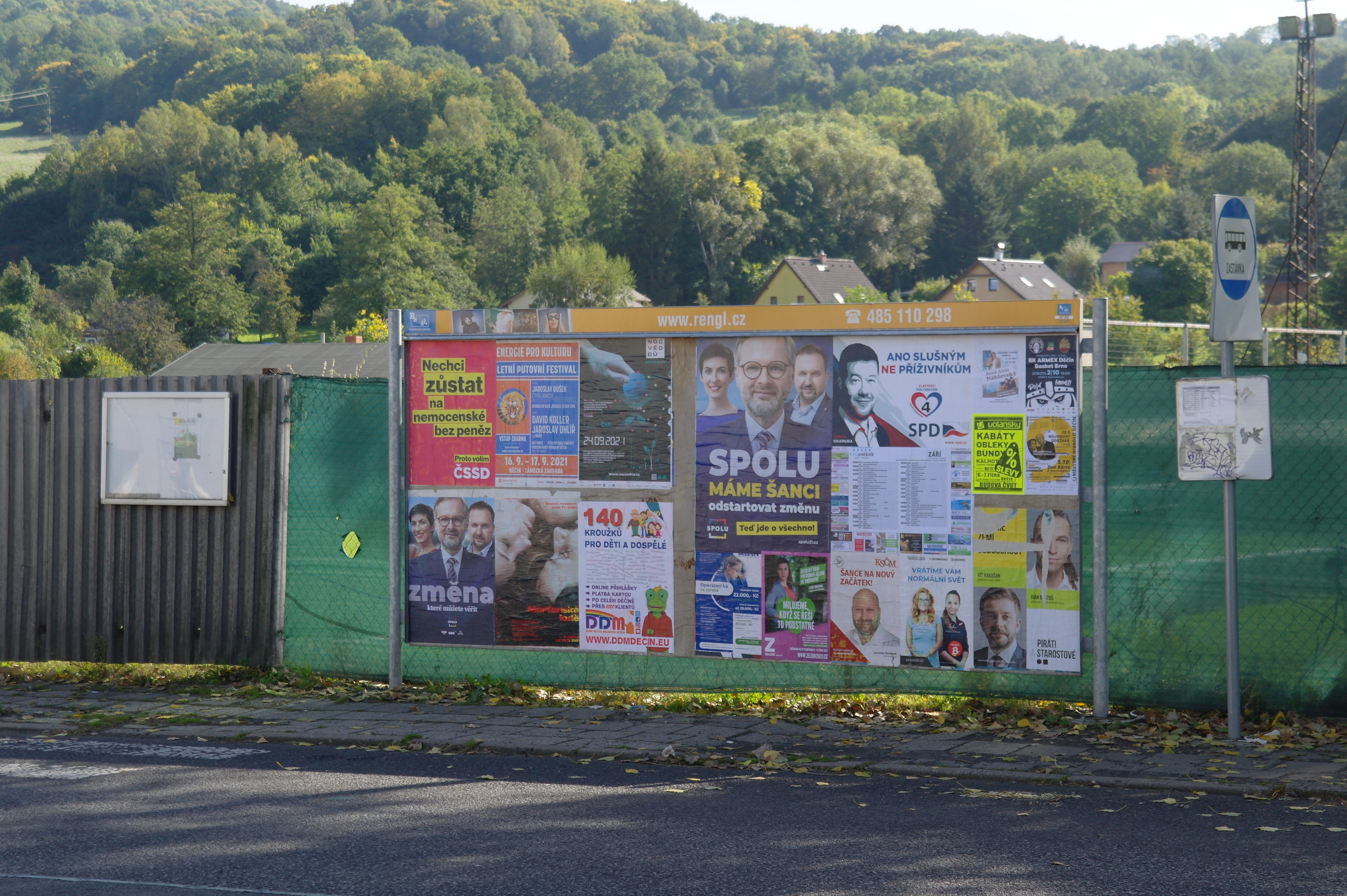
2021 Campaign.

=== Issues ===
The campaign was significantly affected by the COVID-19 pandemic, with opposition parties criticizing the government for its handling of the pandemic and emphasising the country's high death rate. Some parties also focused their campaigns around opposition to the COVID-19 restrictions. Meanwhile, the government parties defended their handling of the crisis, and some government ministers argued that the situation would have been worse if the opposition had been in government. This issue later lost prominence, with economic issues receiving more attention. Several political scientists, including Daniel Prokop, characterised the election as a referendum on Prime Minister Andrej Babiš. During the final phase of the campaign, inflation and the increasing prices of groceries became the main issue, reflected in Spolu's campaign slogan: "The cost of Babiš".

ANO and the far-right parties also focused on immigration during their campaigns, criticising multiculturalism and pledging to prevent "Muslim Europe".

=== Party campaigns ===
==== Alliance for the Future ====
In March 2021, the Civic Democratic Alliance (ODA) formed an electoral alliance with other minor parties called Alliance for the Future (APB), led by Pavel Sehnal. Parties in the alliance included the Agrarian Democratic Party, Order of the Nation and the Democratic Party of Greens. The same year in July, the Party of Common Sense joined the alliance. ODA formally changed its name to Alliance for the Future to avoid the higher electoral threshold.

The alliance's campaign was launched at a press conference on 16 June 2021, where Sehnal introduced APB's priorities, including support for Czech businesses and lower taxes. He also declared support for transatlantic cooperation and EU membership.

==== ANO ====
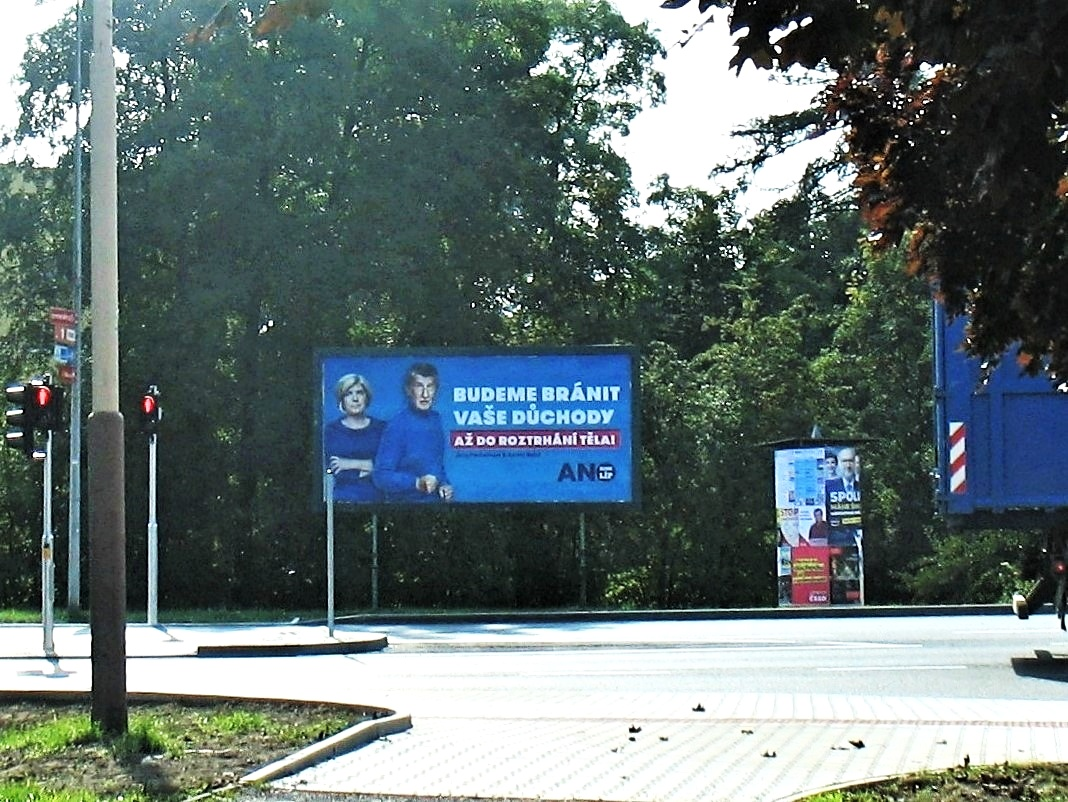
ANO billboard

After opinion polls in early 2021 showed ANO falling behind the Czech Pirate Party, prime minister Andrej Babiš reacted by attacking the Pirates for their progressive stances, such as their supposed support for immigration and legalisation of drug use. The party's campaign thus focused on criticism of the Pirates in early 2021. On 27 June 2021 President Miloš Zeman endorsed ANO, stating that he would vote for the party.

In July 2021, ANO published a book, Share it, before they ban it, allegedly written by Babiš, who began promoting the book during the campaign with book signings. The book primarily boasted about Babiš record in government. Ice cream was also given out at these sessions, in response to the campaign of Pirates and Mayors.

The party officially launched its campaign on 2 September 2021. Babiš promised higher pensions and measures against illegal immigration. He also attacked the opposition alliances, stating that they wanted to destroy the Visegrád Group. Babiš also talked about the defence of Czech national interests. In September 2021, ANO released an election advert for Czech television which attacked the Pirates over alleged support for immigration and links to "antifa". His campaign used the slogan "I will fight for you until my body falls apart!" The launch of the campaign was impacted by the arrival of Babiš' son Andrej Babiš Jr., who was allegedly kidnapped on his father orders leading to the 2018 Czech political crisis. Babiš Jr. confronted his father during the meeting and accused him of deceiving the nation. Babiš later stated that he would not wish any parent to go through such an experience.

On 29 September 2021 Hungarian prime minister Viktor Orbán visited the Czech Republic and formally endorsed ANO at a rally in Ústí nad Labem. Orbán praised Babiš, saying that Hungarians would be glad for a prime minister like Babiš. He also warned about immigration and the European Union during the rally, which was compared to a talkshow of two prime ministers.

Babiš was named in the Pandora Papers leak around a month later. According to the leak, Babiš used offshore companies to buy French Mansion in 2009.

==== Communist Party of Bohemia and Moravia ====
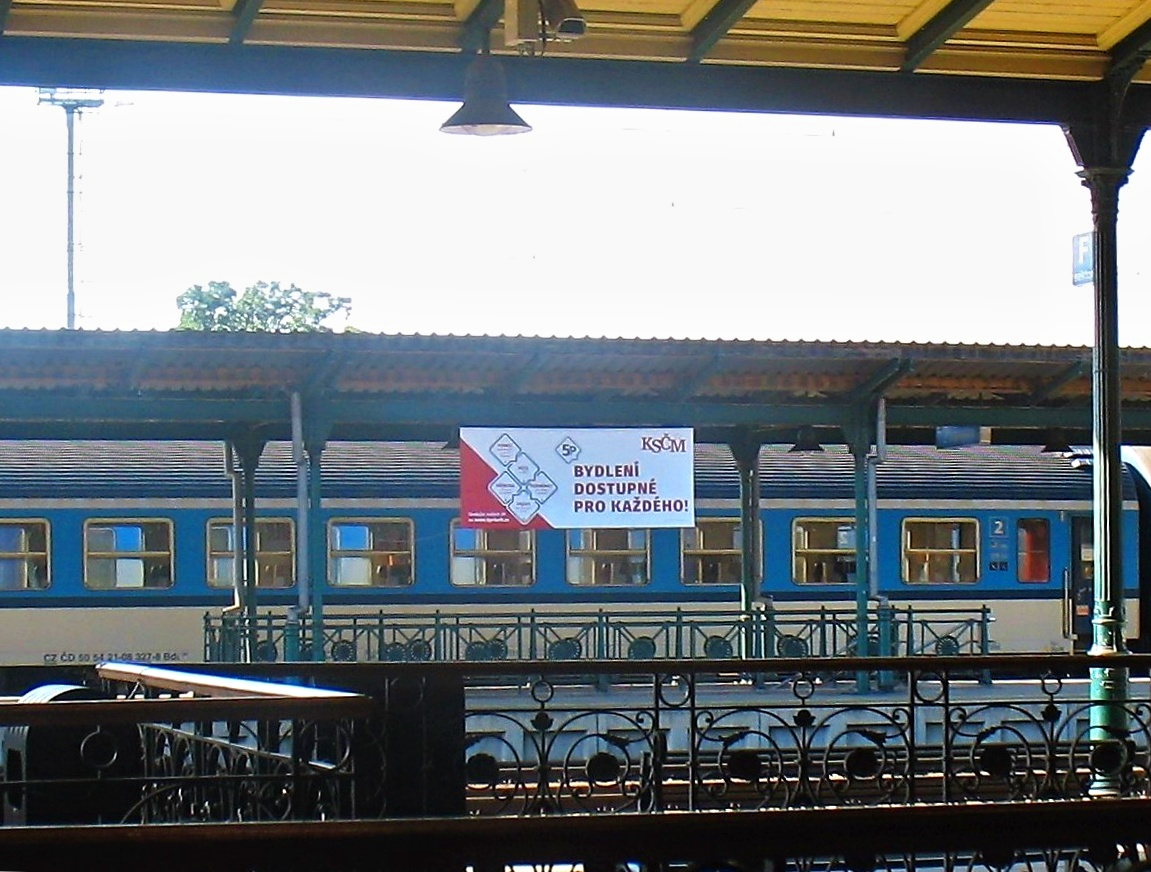
KSČM billboard focusing on housing availability

The Communist Party of Bohemia and Moravia (KSČM) launched its campaign on 4 June 2021. Leader Vojtěch Filip said that a vote for KSČM meant certainty for the future. KSČM named its five priorities as help for children in need, better conditions for life and safety, the right to a dignified life and better environment, a higher minimum wage, and shorter working periods. Filip also stated his party's wish to leave NATO and establish better relationships with China and Russia.

==== Czech Crown ====
The monarchist party Koruna Česká launched its campaign on 9 August 2021. The party supported TOP 09 in the 2017 elections. Chairman Radim Špaček described the program goals, to reform the Czech state from a republic to a parliamentary monarchy, to restore the historical lands of Bohemia, Moravia and Silesia, and revise the legal order. Deputy Chairman Petr Krátký cited a public opinion polling indicating that almost 10% of Czech citizens, especially younger voters, are in favor of a monarchy. The party's list also includes members of other small parties, such as the Conservative Party and Morava 1918.

==== Czech Pirate Party and Mayors and Independents ====
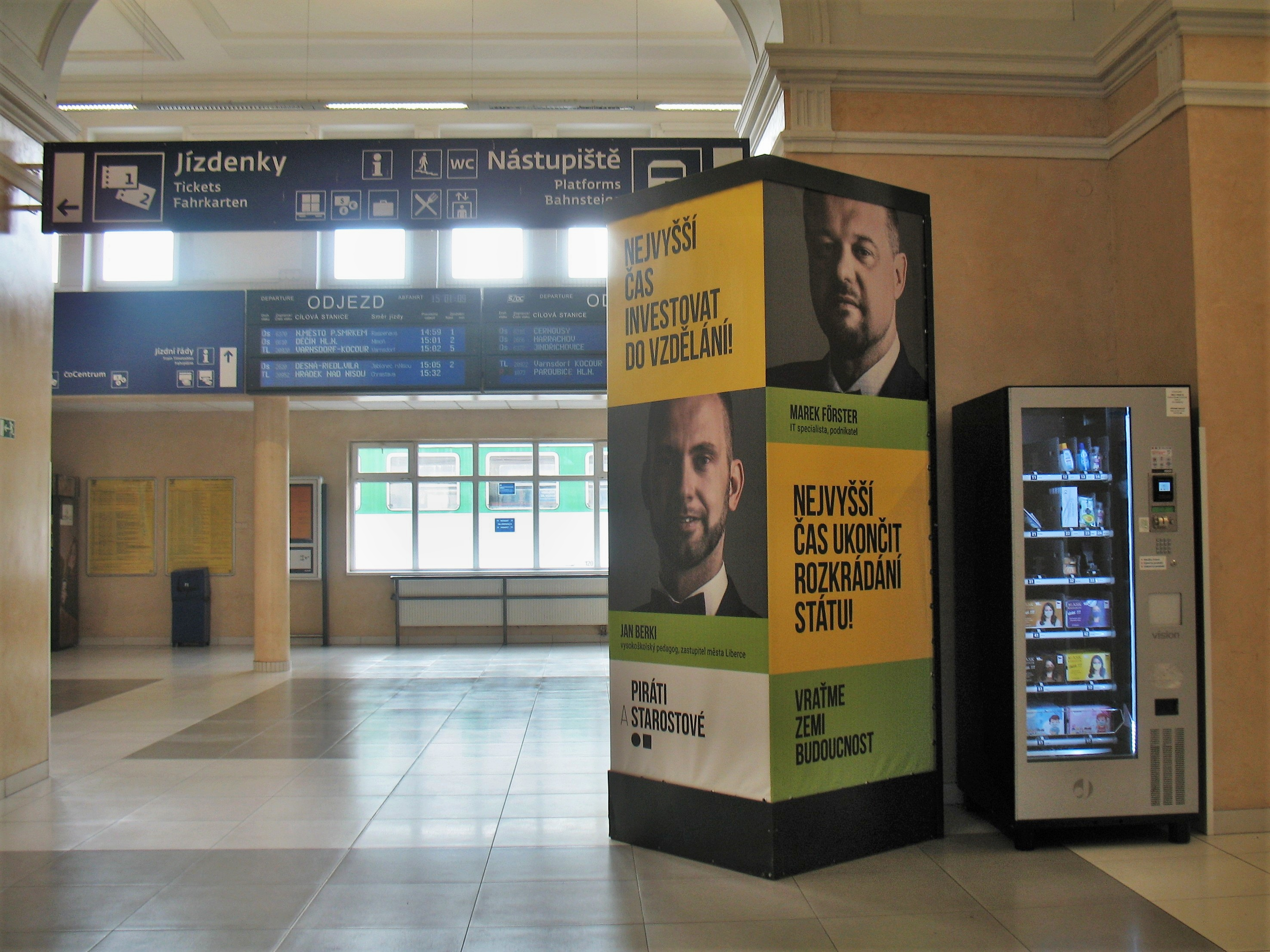
Pirates and Mayors campaign

The Czech Pirate Party and Mayors and Independents (STAN) formed the liberal electoral alliance Pirates and Mayors led by Ivan Bartoš, presenting their cooperation agreement in December 2020. Priorities in the agreement included lower taxes, better availability of health care in the regions, protection of the climate, and transparent governance. The parties also agreed to support adoption of the euro. Bartoš said on 11 January that the alliance's priorities during the campaign would include reform of the debt collection system, digitalisation, environmental issues, and education.

Pirates and STAN launched their campaign on 18 May 2021, with the slogan "Let's give the country back its future" (Czech: Vraťme zemi budoucnost). Bartoš and Rakušan promised to regulate debt collection, raise taxes on commercial buildings, and begin preparations to adopt the euro. A major focus of the alliance's platform is digitalisation of the country. In response to the 2021 South Moravia tornado, Pirates and STAN interrupted their campaign.

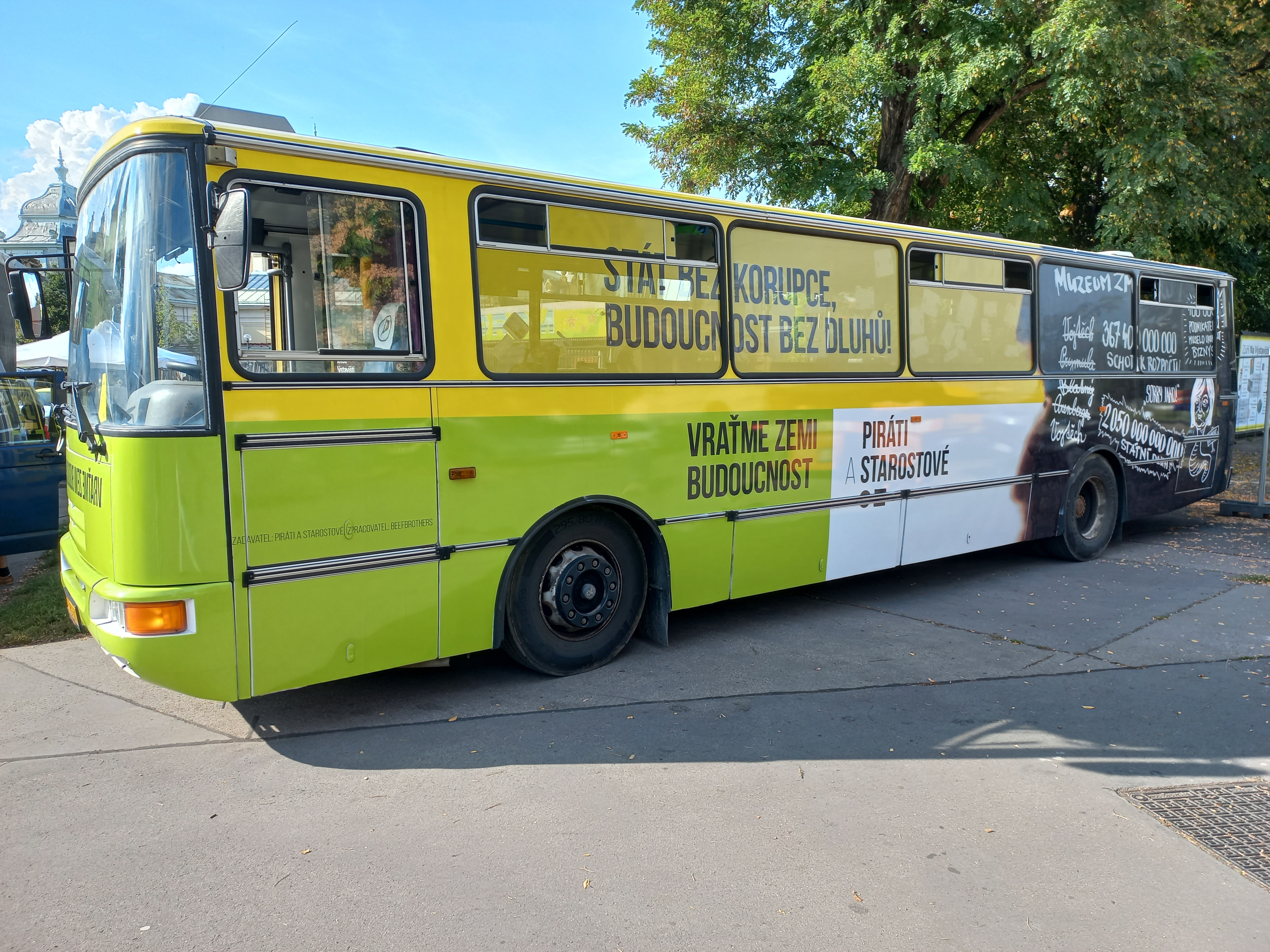
Pirates and Mayors electoral bus.

At a press conference on 24 June 2021, Pirates and STAN launched an anti-corruption campaign, publishing a list of the 10 biggest corruption cases since 1989, primarily involving ODS. The campaign also listed the 10 biggest corruption cases involving the ruling ANO. In July 2021, the alliance released a poster featuring Jakub Michálek, its candidate for Minister of Justice, trying to catch a man in a suit with a lasso, accompanied with anti-corruption slogans. The campaign attracted significant media attention but was also criticised as amateurish and populist.

The alliance relaunched its campaign in August 2021 as a reaction to declining opinion polls. The campaign began to focus more on STAN and its leader Vít Rakušan, though Bartoš remained the alliance's electoral leader and candidate for prime minister. The campaign also focused more on budgetary spending and education.

The final phase of the campaign was launched on 9 September 2021. The alliance introduced an electoral bus in an attempt to replicate the success of the 2017 elections. Pirates and Mayors focused on criticism of the government for its handling of the COVID-19 pandemic and budget spending. Messages written on the bus also recalled various controversies of the government.

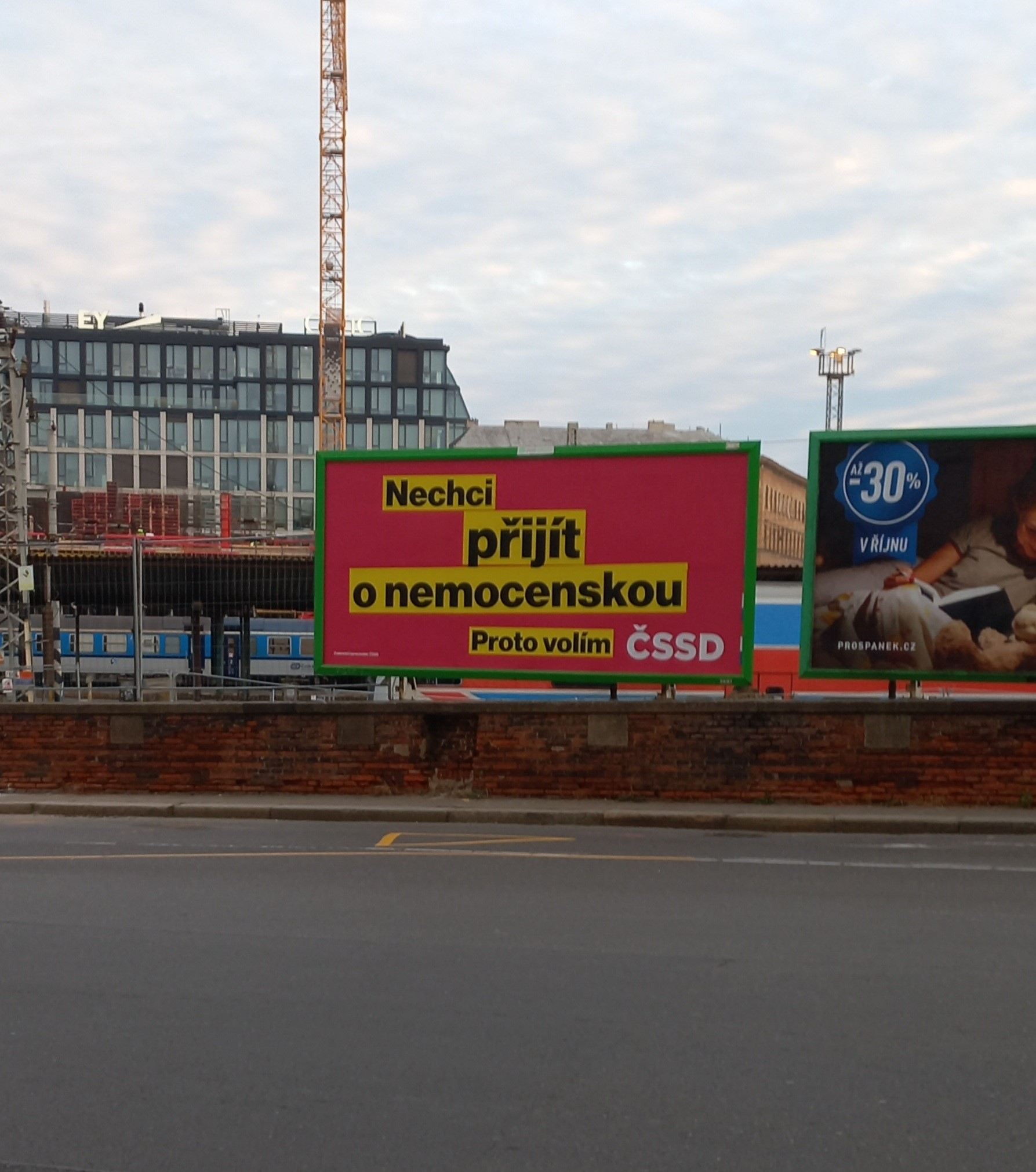
ČSSD campaign

==== Czech Social Democratic Party ====
The Czech Social Democratic Party (ČSSD) launched its campaign on 29 March 2021 with the slogan "We know what to do after Covid." The campaign focused on the solution of the COVID-19 crisis, opposition to privatization of hospitals, support for Kurzarbeit, and shorter working hours. The party also promised to increase taxes for banks and large companies.

The final phase of campaign was launched on 22 August 2021. Party leader Jan Hamáček said that ČSSD was not dead, despite low opinion polling. Major topics of the party's campaign were higher salaries, pension reform, and just redistribution of COVID-19 expenditures. Slogans included "For a just Czech Republic" and "So that no one endangers your life security." ČSSD also expressed their intention to implement progressive taxation and a lower tax on groceries, rejected privatisation of health care, and promised more achievable housing.

ČSSD used Minister of Labour and Social Affairs Jana Maláčová prominently in its campaign. In September, Maláčová and Matěj Stropnický, a candidate for the party in Prague, made a video called "Cool pair", in which they attacked opposition parties, accusing them of corruption and intending to privatize public companies. Maláčová also campaigned at Metro stations giving out leaflets for the party.

==== Free Bloc ====
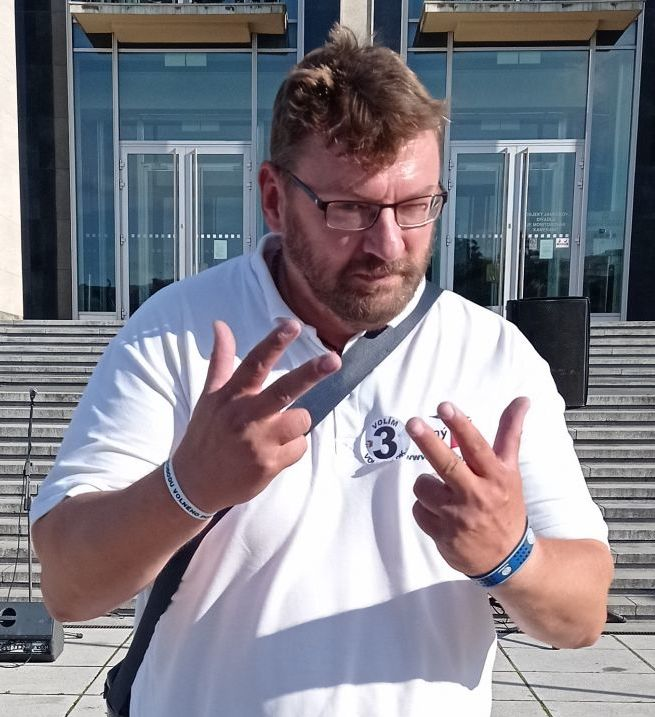
Lubomír Volný campaigning in Brno.

The Free Bloc launched its campaign on 28 August 2021 with a meeting on Letná. Led by MP Lubomír Volný, it focused mainly on opposition to COVID-19 restrictions. Other prominent figures in their campaign were Jana Bobošíková and Hana Lipovská. The Free Bloc held electoral meetings at markets, with Volný travelling around the Czech Republic in a bus called "Volňásek". The campaign concluded with a meeting in Krupka on 6 October 2021.

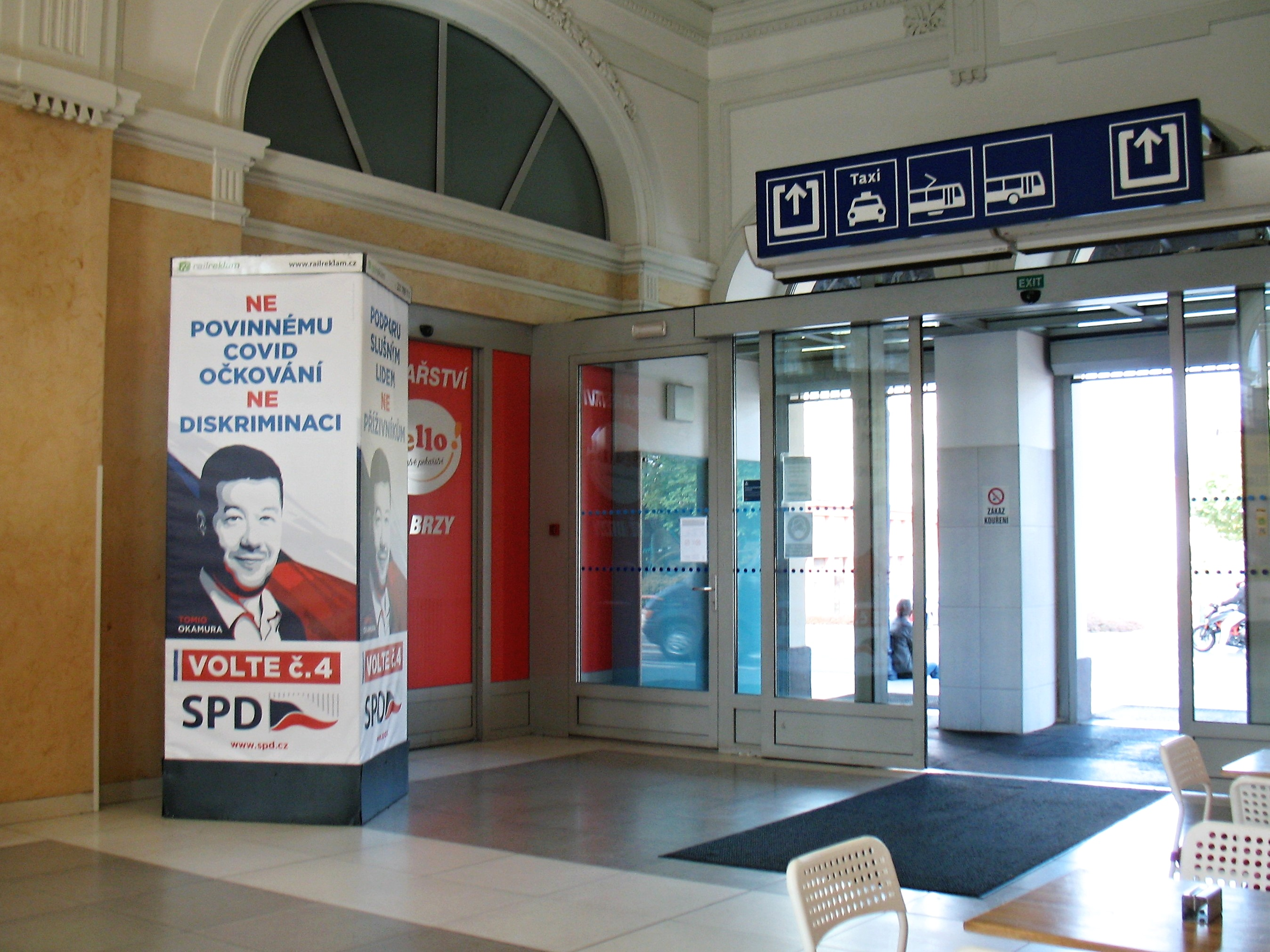
SPD billboard

==== Freedom and Direct Democracy ====
Freedom and Direct Democracy (SPD) launched its campaign on 15 July 2021 with a meeting on Letná. SPD stated that the price for their participation in post-election coalition discussions would be a referendum law, and to hold a referendum on membership of the EU and NATO. Other issues in the party's campaign included opposition to COVID-19 restrictions and mandatory vaccination. SPD used an election truck called "espéďák" to travel around the country, and attempted to attract potential voters to meetings by holding fairs with cheap food.

==== Green Party ====
The Green Party launched its campaign on 29 June 2021, with the slogan "Lets Give Green to Women", focused on feminist issues and environmentalism. Besides green, the party used pink in its campaign. Magdalena Davis was announced as the party's electoral leader, and a large number of their candidates were women. Davis described the predominance of men in politics as a medieval custom.

The final phase of the party's campaign was launched on 31 August 2021 in Brno, at the Brno astronomical clock. The Greens described it as a phallic, masculine symbol, and covered it with various images of female potential. Participants in the meeting held signs with slogans such as "We love modern schools" and "We love fathers on parental leave". Another key issue was the climate crisis, with the party proposing higher penalties for environmental crimes.

==== People FOR ====
The People FOR political movement, led by political activist Mikuláš Minář, was launched on 3 December 2020, and started gathering the 500,000 signatures required for participation in the elections. Minář said that the movement does not want to be another 5% party. On 24 March 2021, Minář announced the end of the movement due to low interest from voters, having collected only 39,251 signatures.

==== Přísaha ====
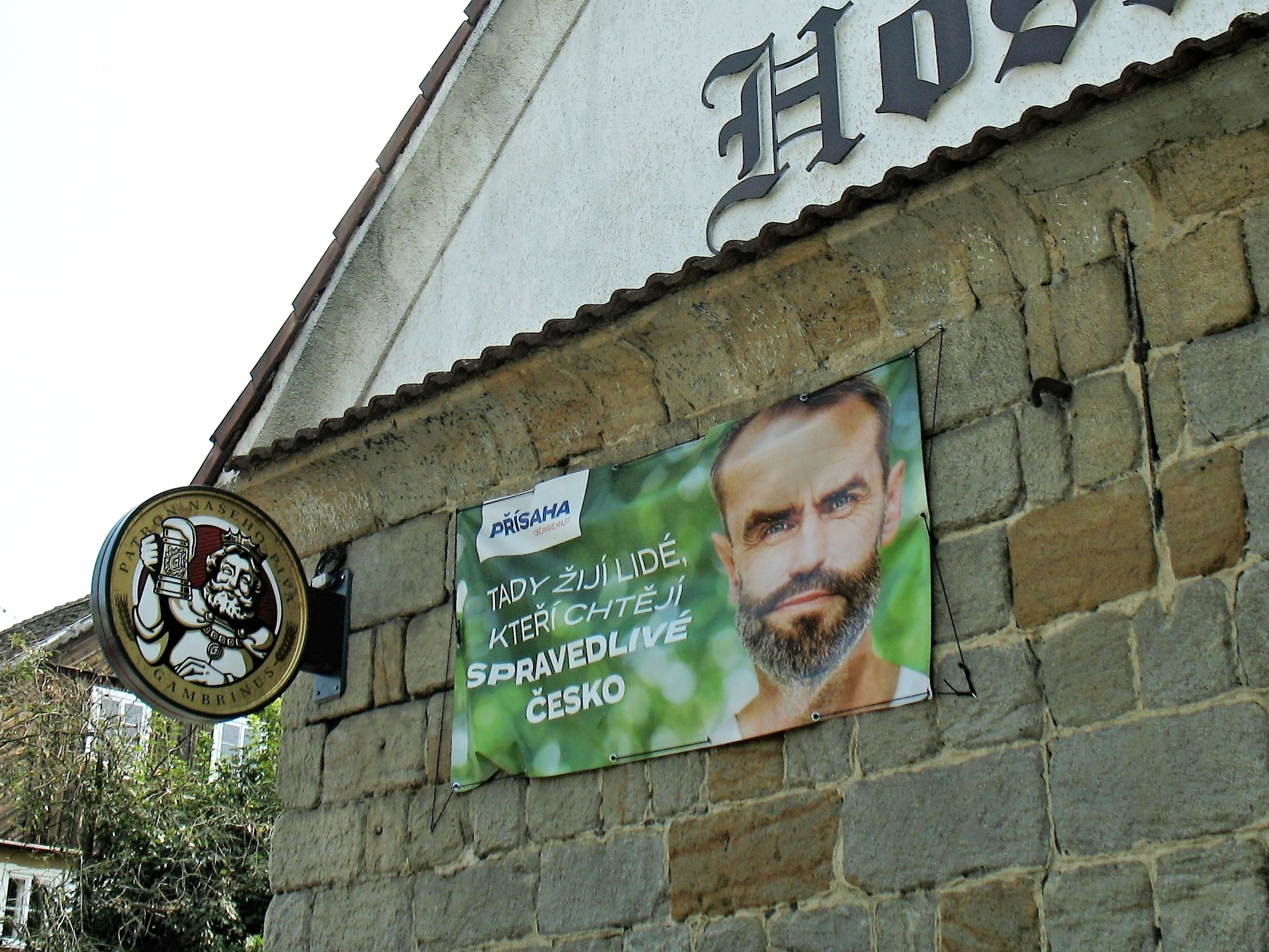
Přísaha poster saying: "People who want a just Czechia live here."

Robert Šlachta, the former Director of the police unit against organized crime, formed the anti-corruption party Přísaha before the election. He launched the campaign at a meeting on 28 January 2021. Šlachta stated that he did not believe it was the right time to adopt the euro and was opposed to migrant quotas.

The final phase of the campaign was launched on 25 August 2021. Přísaha introduced its regional leaders and program, under the slogan "Let's go to them!" The main campaign topic was fighting corruption and clientelism. Šlachta also stated that he wanted to make courts faster and fight for Czech identity, rejecting the euro and migration quotas. He also pledged to investigate all state contracts concluded under the state of emergency. Šlachta stated that Přísaha had crowdfunded 13.8 million CZK for the campaign, and calculated that the campaign would cost around 15 million CZK.

The party hovered around the 5% electoral threshold in polling between May and the election. In September 2021, Přísaha's support in opinion polls gradually declined, which was blamed on the launch of the ANO campaign. Šlachta stated before voting that he believed the party would reach his goal of surpassing the 5% threshold.

==== SPOLU ====
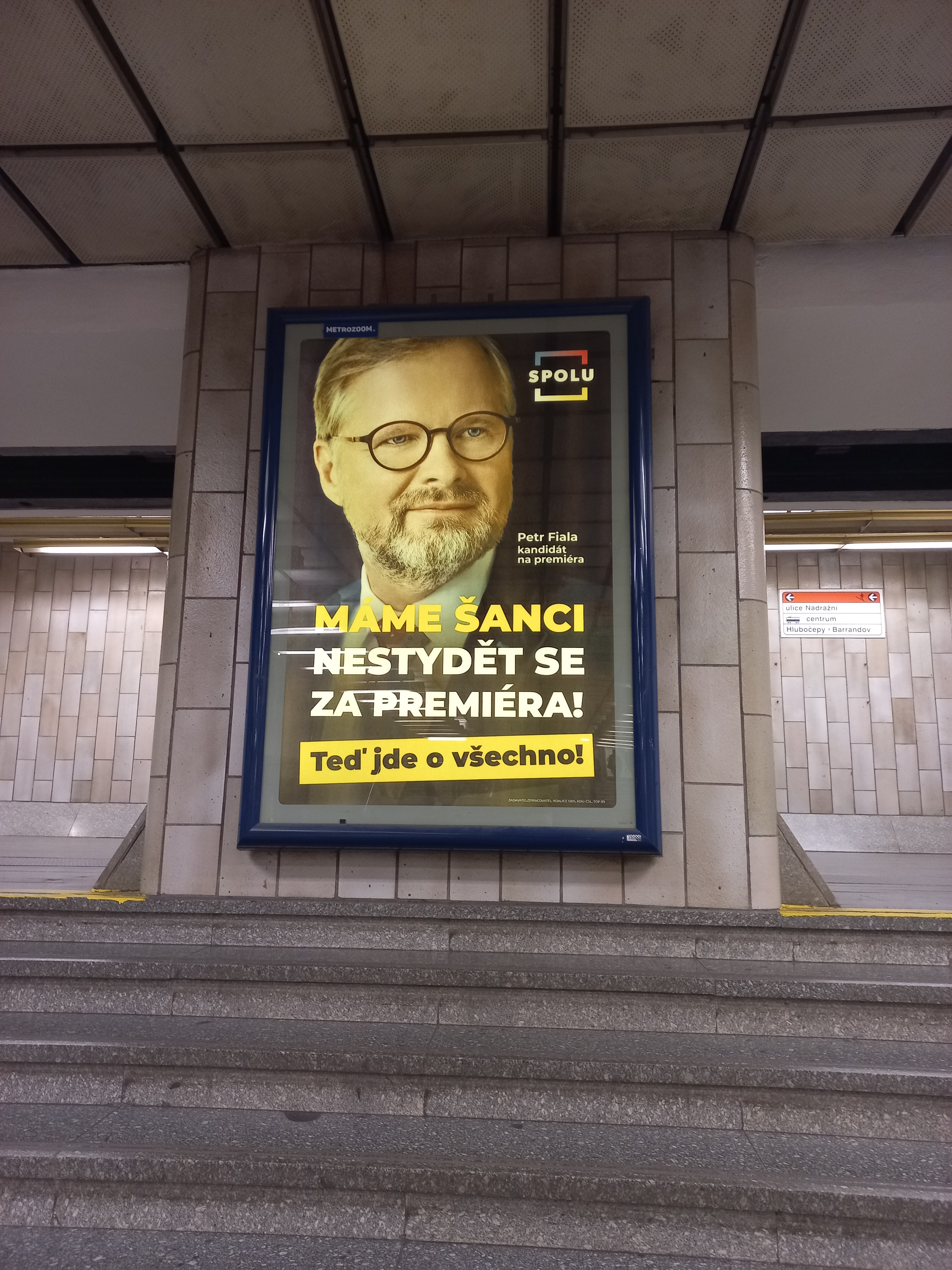
SPOLU poster with leader Petr Fiala

Three centre-right parties, the Civic Democratic Party, KDU-ČSL, and TOP 09, formed an electoral alliance called SPOLU. Led by Petr Fiala, the alliance launched its campaign on 9 December 2020, promising to reform tax, the social and pension system, and healthcare. Its proposals included a minimum pension, a simplification of social benefits, support for education, and better use of EU funds as well as a focus on climate change. It opposes leaving the EU and supports membership of NATO. TOP 09 leader Markéta Pekarová Adamová described the alliance as a centre-right liberal conservative political force.

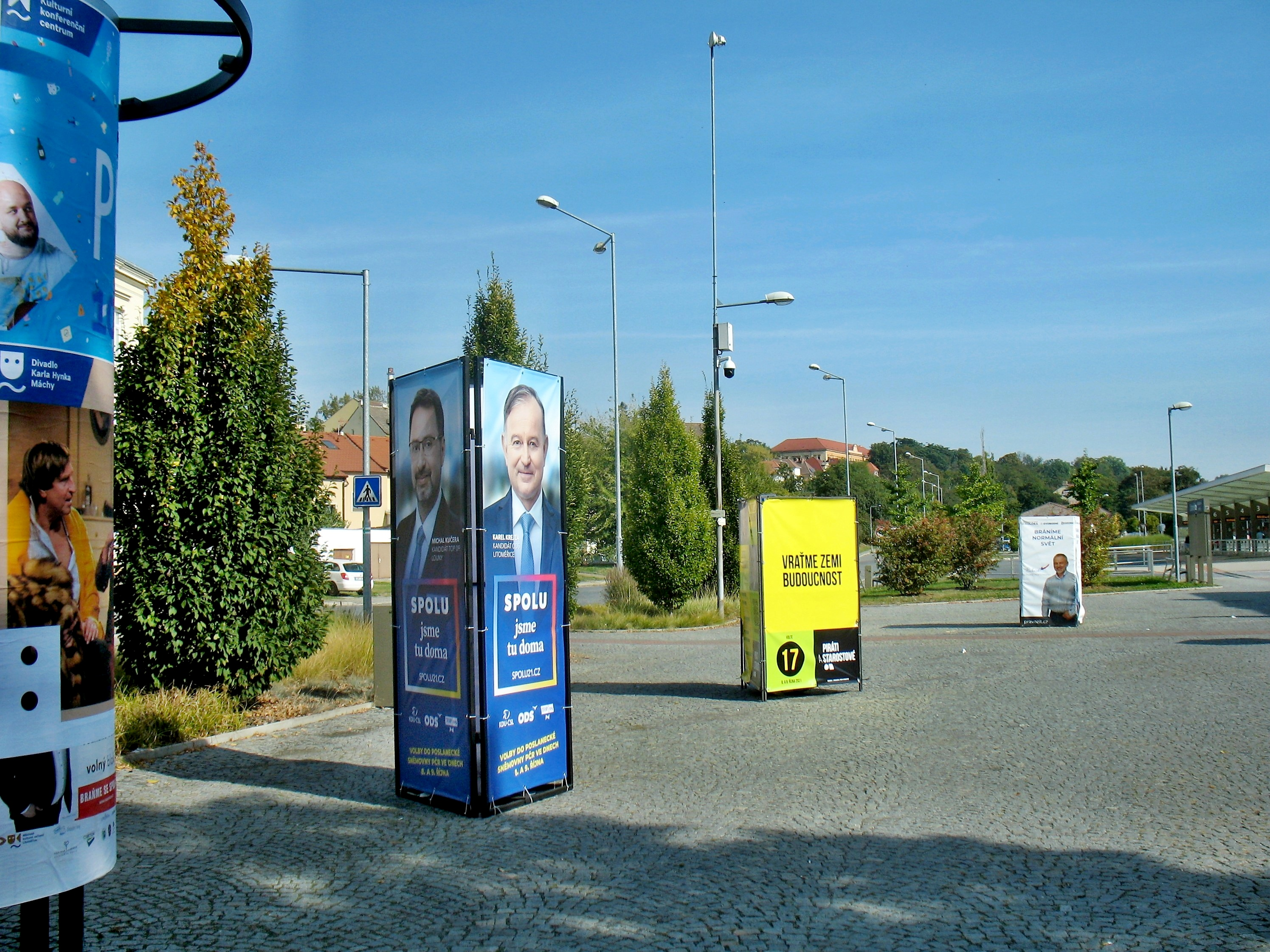
Billboards of running parties

SPOLU launched its campaign on 19 May 2021 in Brno. The campaign's slogan was "We will bring the Czech Republic together." Fiala said that SPOLU wants an "economically capable and educated Czechia". Spolu planned to use Dominik Feri as the face of an Instagram campaign targeting young voters entitled "I have a voice". In May 2021, Feri resigned from his political posts after being accused of sexual assault and rape by eight women, and the campaign was withdrawn. In response to the 2021 South Moravia tornado, Spolu interrupted its campaign in South Moravia and donated 1.5 million CZK to help people in the affected areas.

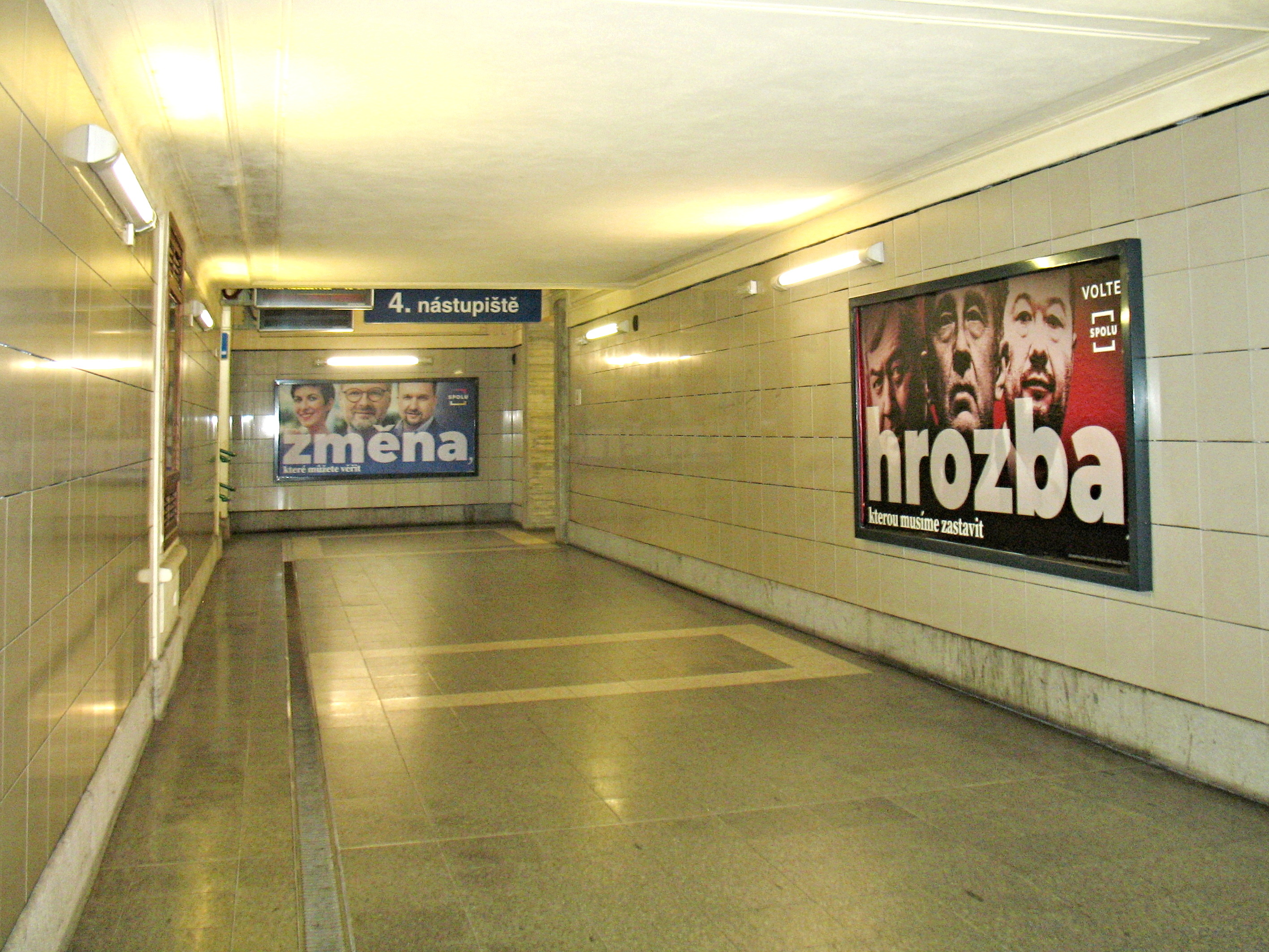
Billboards used by SPOLU

From August, Spolu's campaign featured a bus, known as the "positive bus", to be used for its candidates' personal campaigns. Spolu also screened the film Women on the Run at its campaign meetings, and featured stand-up comedians including Petr Čtvrtníček in electoral adverts. Fiala became more active on social media and travelled around the Czech Republic as part of a personal campaign. In late August 2021, Spolu used billboards featuring the leaders of ANO, KSČM, and SPD with the word "Threat", which was often juxtaposed with a billboard featuring the leaders of Spolu with the words "Change you can trust." On 4 September 2021, SPOLU reacted to the launch of ANO's campaign by launching a parody meme generator inspired by the ANO campaign and its slogan "Until my body falls apart!". On 3 September 2021, SPOLU were endorsed by Austrian Chancellor Sebastian Kurz, who sent a letter to Fiala wishing the alliance electoral success.

SPOLU launched the final phase of their campaign on 20 September 2021 with a meeting inspired by the United States presidential campaigns. In a speech, Fiala criticised Andrej Babiš' Cabinet for populism and warned against extremists. Fiala pledged that SPOLU would reduce the public debt without increasing taxes, guarantee the pro-Western orientation of the country, and digitalise public administration. He also said he wanted to solve the housing crisis. The meeting was held under the slogans "It is about everything now" and "Let's start change." Around this time, prominent representatives of Spolu visited the regions to meet with citizens.

Following the television debates, SPOLU used the line "The cost of Babiš" to attack the government over inflation and the rising prices of energy and groceries. The term was first used by Fiala during a debate on Prima CNN News, before becoming a part of the alliance's billboard campaign and spreading among ODS supporters. Fiala himself used the term repeatedly during debates.

In the last polls before the election, Spolu were polling second behind ANO. Commentators noted that the gap between ANO and Spolu was narrowing, but none predicted that Spolu would pull ahead.

==== Tricolour–Svobodní–Soukromníci ====
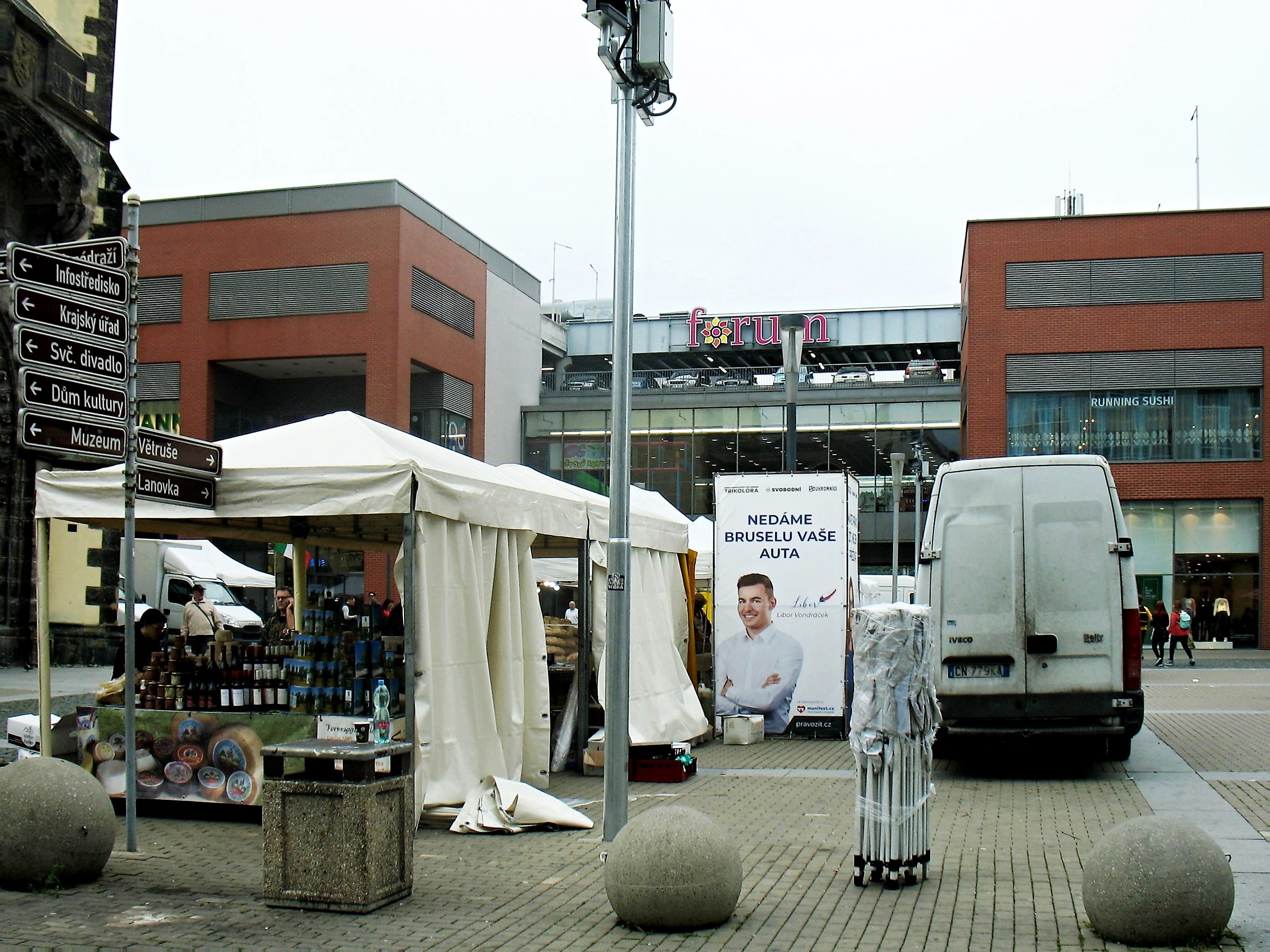
Svobodní campaign

The Tricolour Citizens' Movement, Svobodní, and Freeholder Party of the Czech Republic formed an electoral alliance called Tricolour–Svobodní–Soukromníci (TSS), led by Tricolour leader Zuzana Majerová Zahradníková. Václav Klaus Jr. was originally meant to be the electoral leader, but he quit politics soon after formation of the alliance.

TSS launched its campaign on 17 June 2021 with the slogan "We have a right to live". Their campaign focused on traditional values and opposition to COVID-19 restrictions. Majerová Zahradníková targeted right-wing Eurosceptic voters, and also wanted to use former Czech President Václav Klaus during the campaign. Majerová Zahradníková stated during the campaign that TSS rejected the lockdown, Green New Deal, and grocery quotas. During September 2021 she also campaigned on the issue of rising prices. TSS aimed to win 7% of votes.

During final phase of the campaign, TSS focused on Spolu voters, distributing leaflets warning of a new Opposition agreement. TSS also attacked Spolu for being too Green and too pro-Europe. The party warned of "Covid totalitarianism" while attacking COVID-19 restrictions, rejecting a new lockdown, school closures, or "segregation of the non-vaccinated". TSS argued that it was the only "true authentic right" on the Czech political scene. A few hours prior to the election it was endorsed by former Czech president Václav Klaus.

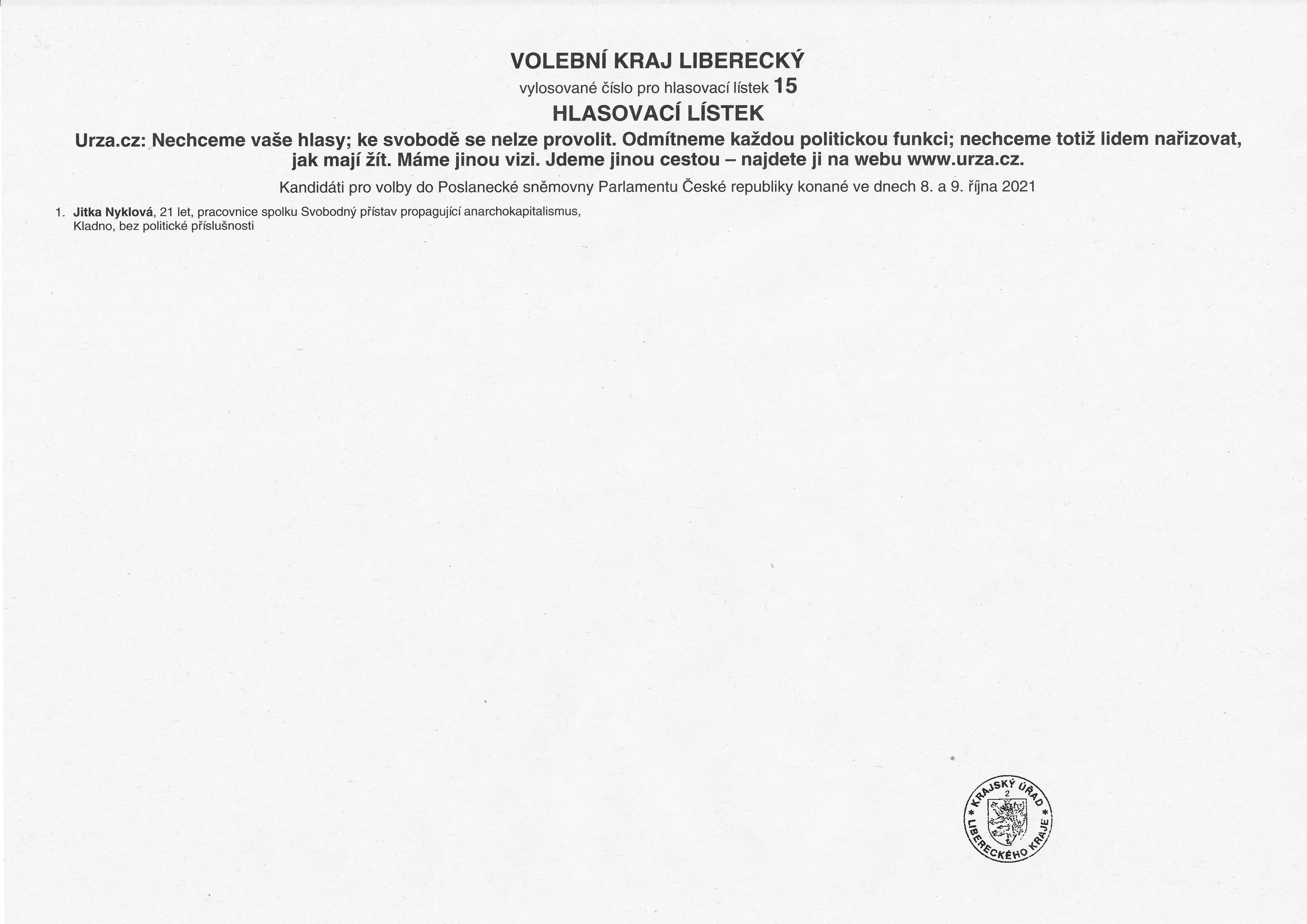
Urza.cz voting ballot for Liberec region.

==== Urza.cz ====
Urza.cz is an anarcho-capitalist party led by Martin Urza. Its campaign began gathering signatures in April 2021. The party was registered in July 2021. Urza was campaigning to promote his beliefs, rather than attract votes. The party promised that its MPs would resign if elected, as it did not believe that anyone should govern by force.

==== We Will Open Czechia ====
The Chcípl pes (English: The Dog Croaked) initiative was created in opposition to COVID-19 restrictions. Its members decided to form a political party called "We Will Open Czechia". Its campaign was focused against COVID-19 restrictions and included various protests. The party also called on pub owners to open their businesses despite government orders. In April 2021 the party sent a mobile barber shop to Prague, where the public could get haircuts or buy beer. It was also used as a petition stand. The barber shop later moved from Prague to other locations around the country, finishing its journey in Ostrava. In August 2021, the leaders of the party called for a new Prague defenestration, saying that "people should do anything required to overthrow criminal deputies."

=== Independent initiatives ===
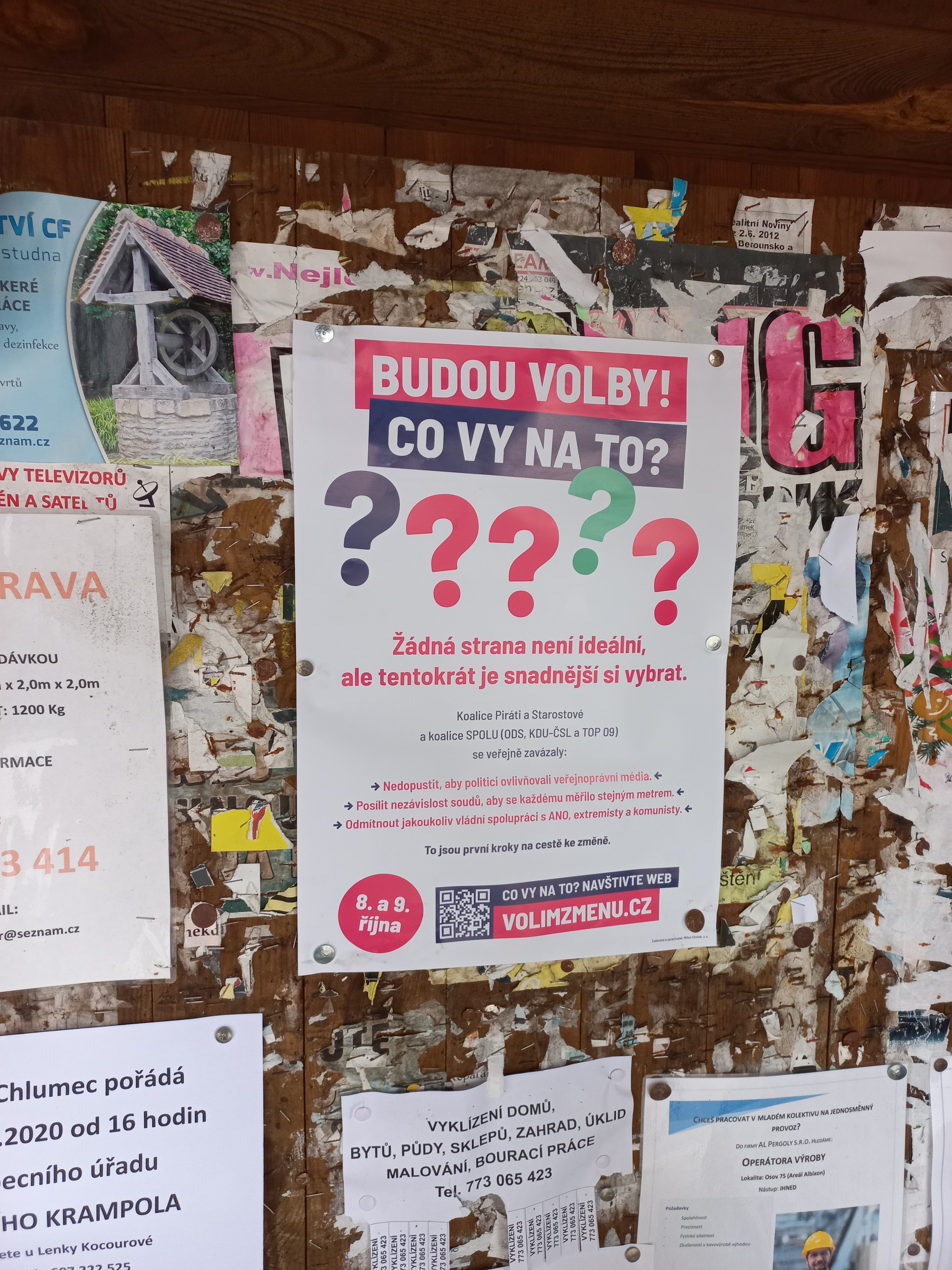
Million Moments for Democracy campaign.

==== Million Moments for Democracy ====
Million Moments for Democracy led a campaign against Andrej Babiš and ANO, attempting to persuade voters to support the opposition alliances Spolu or Pirates and Mayors. Members of the movement talked to people in the streets and gave them leaflets in order to change their minds vote for one of major opposition alliances. The campaign also included a messenger app called "I vote change", which aimed to persuade people through gifs and various questions that they should vote for Spolu or Pirates and Mayors. Leader Benjamin Roll denied that the organisation's activities were a real election campaign, insisting that it was aiming to inform people. The group's activities attracted the attention of the Office for the Supervision of the Management of Political Parties and Political Movements, which launched an investigation into possible election law violations, as the organisation had not registered as an organisation participating in the campaign.

=== Campaign finances ===
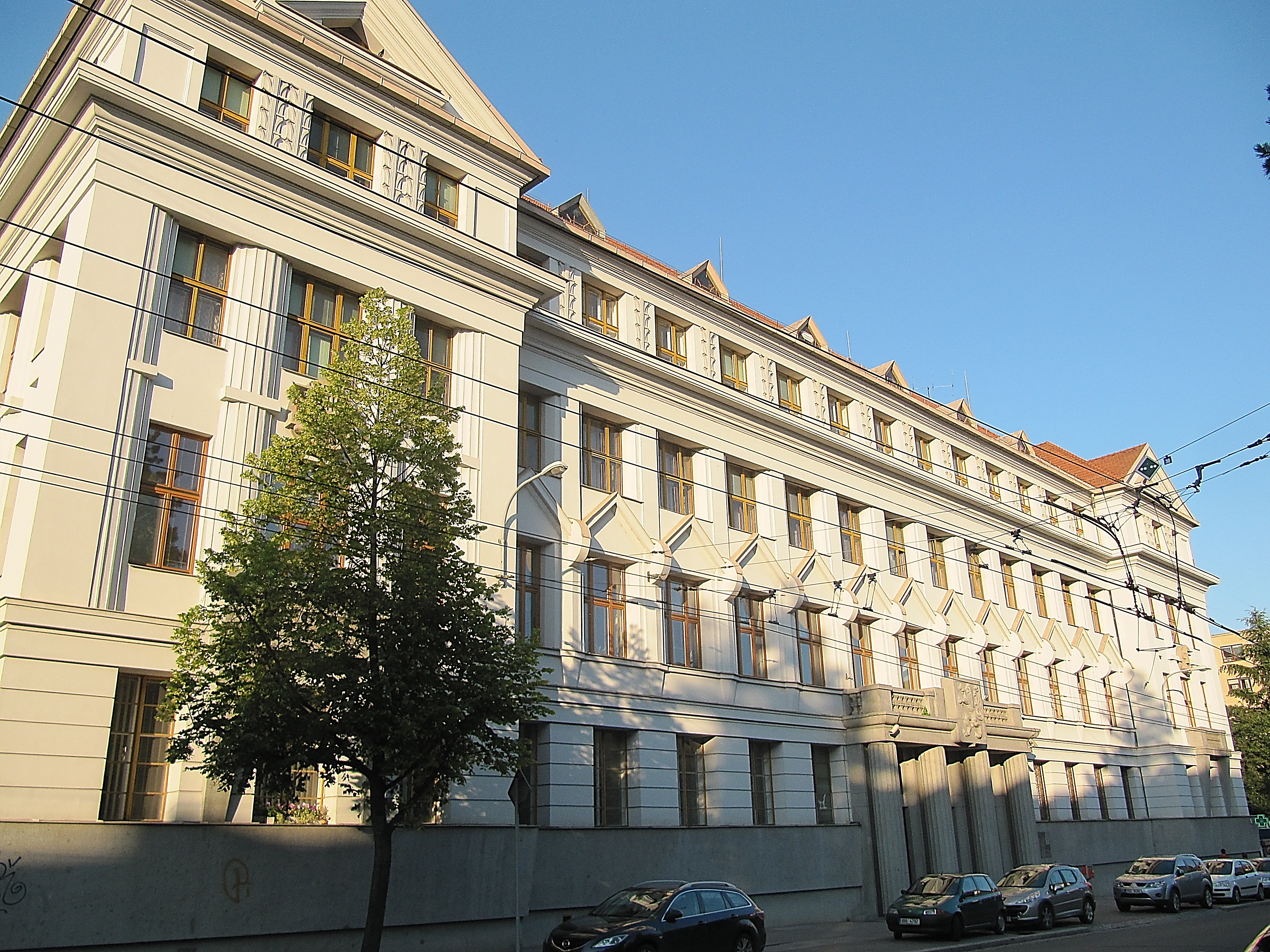
Office for the Supervision of the Management of Political Parties and Political Movements

Party	Money raised (CZK)	Services cost (CZK)	Money Spent (CZK)	Debt (CZK)	Source
SPOLU	18,859,722.00	3,446,676.00	89,773,505.08	0	
ANO	1,065,000.00	60,000.00	87,618,996.62	0	
Pirates and Mayors	20,396,221.00	1,857,516.66	81,337,980.42	0	
Freedom and Direct Democracy	3,141,861.99	1,358,038.00	75,939,166.10	5,000,000	
Czech Social Democratic Party	2,546,420.00	1,593,742.50	54,380,892.21	0	
Přísaha	12,244,707.00	14,238,221.12	43,820,819.80	0	
Communist Party of Bohemia and Moravia	694,051.00	1,075,624.00	32,363,258.74	0	
Tricolour–Svobodní–Soukromníci	20,705,726.88	5,564,966.00	31,172,191.62	0	
Alliance for the Future	1,742,000.00	1,593,400.00	14,363,179.49	0	
Free Bloc	245,383.99	1,130,051.00	4,457,980.03	0	
Czech Crown	1,261,558.00	1,036,215.00	3,285,740.98	20,070	
Svobodní	2,397,275.93	503,200.00	3,141,005.48	0	
Green Party	2,629,918.54	58,723,55.00	2,327,904.13	0	
Swiss Democracy	1,952,494.66	0	1,901,264.69	0	
We Will Open Czechia	851,513.00	0	848,312.50	0	
Alliance of National Forces	307,578.30	273,700.00	581,278.30	0	
Moravané	509,457.80	13,000.00	513,001.89	0	
Party of Common Sense	305,300.00	29,000.00	330,034.90	0	
The Left	233,133.00	0	232,744.29	0	
Sources Movement	98,000.00	4,000.00	161,054.65	0	
National Democracy	141,461.07	25,400.00	25,400.00	0	

== Endorsements ==
=== ANO ===
==== Individuals ====
- Viktor Orbán
- Miloš Zeman

=== Czech Social Democratic Party ===
==== Parties ====
- Patriots of Olomouc Region

==== Individuals ====
- Jiří Krampol
- Jiří Šlégr

=== Pirates and Mayors ===
==== Parties ====
- Clean Budějovice
- Idealists.cz
- Senator 21

==== Individuals ====
- Eva Holubová
- Jan Hřebejk
- Jaroslav Hutka
- David Koller
- Karel Zima

=== SPOLU ===
==== Parties ====
- Club of Committed Non-Party Members
- SNK European Democrats

==== Individuals ====
- Heidi Janků
- Sebastian Kurz
- Matěj Ruppert
- Filip Smoljak
- Tomáš Töpfer

=== Tricolour–Svobodní–Soukromníci ===
==== Parties ====
- Independence Party of the Czech Republic

==== Individuals ====
- František Ringo Čech
- Ondřej Hejma
- Daniel Hůlka

== Debates ==
2021 Czech parliamentary election debates
Date	Organisers									
Date	Organisers	P Present S Surrogate NI Not invited A Absent N No debate NI Not invited								
Date	Organisers	ANO	SPOLU	PirStan	SPD	KSČM	ČSSD	P	T–S–S	Z
1 July 2021	CNN Prima News	NI	NI	NI	NI	S Stanislav Grospič	S Jana Maláčová	P Robert Šlachta	P Zuzana Majerová Zahradníková	NI
1 July 2021	CNN Prima News	S Radek Vondráček	S Martin Kupka	S Jan Farský	P Tomio Okamura	NI	NI	NI	NI	NI
18 August – 29 September 2021	Denik.cz	P Andrej Babiš	P Petr Fiala	P Ivan Bartoš	NI	NI	NI	NI	NI	NI
19 August 2021	CNN Prima News	NI	NI	NI	NI	P Vojtěch Filip	P Jan Hamáček	P Robert Šlachta	P Zuzana Majerová Zahradníková	NI
19 August 2021	CNN Prima News	S Karel Havlíček	S Marian Jurečka	S Vít Rakušan	P Tomio Okamura	NI	NI	NI	NI	NI
1 September 2021	CNN Prima News	P Andrej Babiš	S Marian Jurečka	P Ivan Bartoš	NI	NI	P Jan Hamáček	NI	NI	NI
8 September 2021	CNN Prima News	NI	NI	NI	S Radim Fiala	S Jiří Dolejš	NI	P Robert Šlachta	S Petr Bajer	NI
22 September 2021	CNN Prima News	S Radek Vondráček	NI	NI	P Tomio Okamura	S Zdeněk Ondráček	P Jan Hamáček	NI	NI	NI
26 September 2021	Prima	P Andrej Babiš	P Petr Fiala	S Vít Rakušan	P Tomio Okamura	P Vojtěch Filip	P Jan Hamáček	P Robert Šlachta	P Zuzana Majerová Zahradníková	NI
29 September 2021	CNN Prima News	NI	S Jana Černochová	S Jan Lipavský	NI	NI	NI	P Robert Šlachta	S Libor Vondráček	NI
30 September 2021	Televize Seznam	S Alena Schillerová	S Marian Jurečka	P Ivan Bartoš	P Tomio Okamura	S Stanislav Grospič	P Jan Hamáček	P Robert Šlachta	S Libor Vondráček	P Magdalena Davis
3 October 2021	Prima	P Andrej Babiš	P Petr Fiala	P Ivan Bartoš	P Tomio Okamura	NI	NI	NI	NI	NI
4 October 2021	iDnes	P Andrej Babiš	P Petr Fiala	P Ivan Bartoš	P Tomio Okamura	P Vojtěch Filip	P Jan Hamáček	P Robert Šlachta	'NI	'NI
6 October 2021	CNN Prima News	S Alena Schillerová	S Zbyněk Stanjura	S Věslav Michalík	S Jan Hrnčíř	S Miloslava Vostrá	S Jana Maláčová	S Pavel Žeřábek	S Libor Vondráček	NI
6 October 2021	Česká televize	P Andrej Babiš	P Petr Fiala	S Vít Rakušan	P Tomio Okamura	P Vojtěch Filip	P Jan Hamáček	P Robert Šlachta	P Zuzana Majerová Zahradníková	NI
8 October 2021	Český Rozhlas	P Andrej Babiš	P Petr Fiala	S Vít Rakušan	P Tomio Okamura	P Vojtěch Filip	P Jan Hamáček	P Robert Šlachta	P Zuzana Majerová Zahradníková	NI
7 October 2021	Nova	NI	NI	NI	P Tomio Okamura	P Vojtěch Filip	P Jan Hamáček	P Robert Šlachta	NI	NI
7 October 2021	Nova	P Andrej Babiš	P Petr Fiala	P Ivan Bartoš	NI	NI	NI	NI	NI	NI
Candidate viewed as "most convincing" in each debate
Debate	Poll/Survey	ANO	SPOLU	PirStan	SPD	KSČM	ČSSD	P	T–S–S	Z
1 September 2021; CNN Prima News	Prima News	Andrej Babiš; 30.8	Marian Jurečka; 13.8	Ivan Bartoš; 45.0	NI	NI	Jan Hamáček; 10.4	NI	NI	NI
8 September 2021; CNN Prima News	Prima News	NI	NI	NI	Radim Fiala; 10.8	Jiří Dolejš; 14.2	NI	Robert Šlachta; 44.4	Petr Bajer; 30.6	NI
22 September 2021; CNN Prima News	Prima News	Radek Vondráček; 7.2	NI	NI	Tomio Okamura; 46.2	Zdeněk Ondráček; 2.8	Jan Hamáček; 43.9	NI	NI	NI
26 September 2021; CNN Prima News	Prima News	Andrej Babiš; 11.6	Petr Fiala; 31.8	Vít Rakušan; 33.1	Tomio Okamura; 5.9	Vojtěch Filip; 1.0	Jan Hamáček; 3.6	Robert Šlachta; 4.9	Zuzana Majerová Zahradníková; 8.1	NI
18 August – 29 September 2021; Denik.cz	Denik.cz	Andrej Babiš; 25	Petr Fiala; 39	Ivan Bartoš; 32	NI	NI	NI	NI	NI	NI
29 September 2021; CNN Prima News	Prima News	NI	Jana Černochová; 22.1	Jan Lipavský; 13.5	NI	NI	NI	Robert Šlachta; 19.0	Libor Vondráček; 45.4	NI
3 October 2021; CNN Prima News	Prima News	Andrej Babiš; 34.4	Petr Fiala; 35.4	Ivan Bartoš; 19.8	Tomio Okamura; 10.4	NI	NI	NI	NI	NI
4 October 2021 iDnes	iDnes	Andrej Babiš; 15	Petr Fiala; 38	Ivan Bartoš; 26	Tomio Okamura; 7	Vojtěch Filip; 3	Jan Hamáček; 6	Robert Šlachta; 5	'NI	'NI
6 October 2021; CNN Prima News	Prima News	NI	NI	NI	Jan Hrnčíř; 8.3	NI	Jana Maláčová; 35.8	Pavel Řežábek; 5.0	Libor Vondráček; 51.0	NI
6 October 2021; CNN Prima News	Prima News	Alena Schillerová; 36.4	Zbyněk Stanjura; 58.0	Věslav Michalik; 3.5	NI	Miloslava Vostrá; 2.0	NI	NI	NI	NI

== Opinion polls ==
View source data.

== Results ==
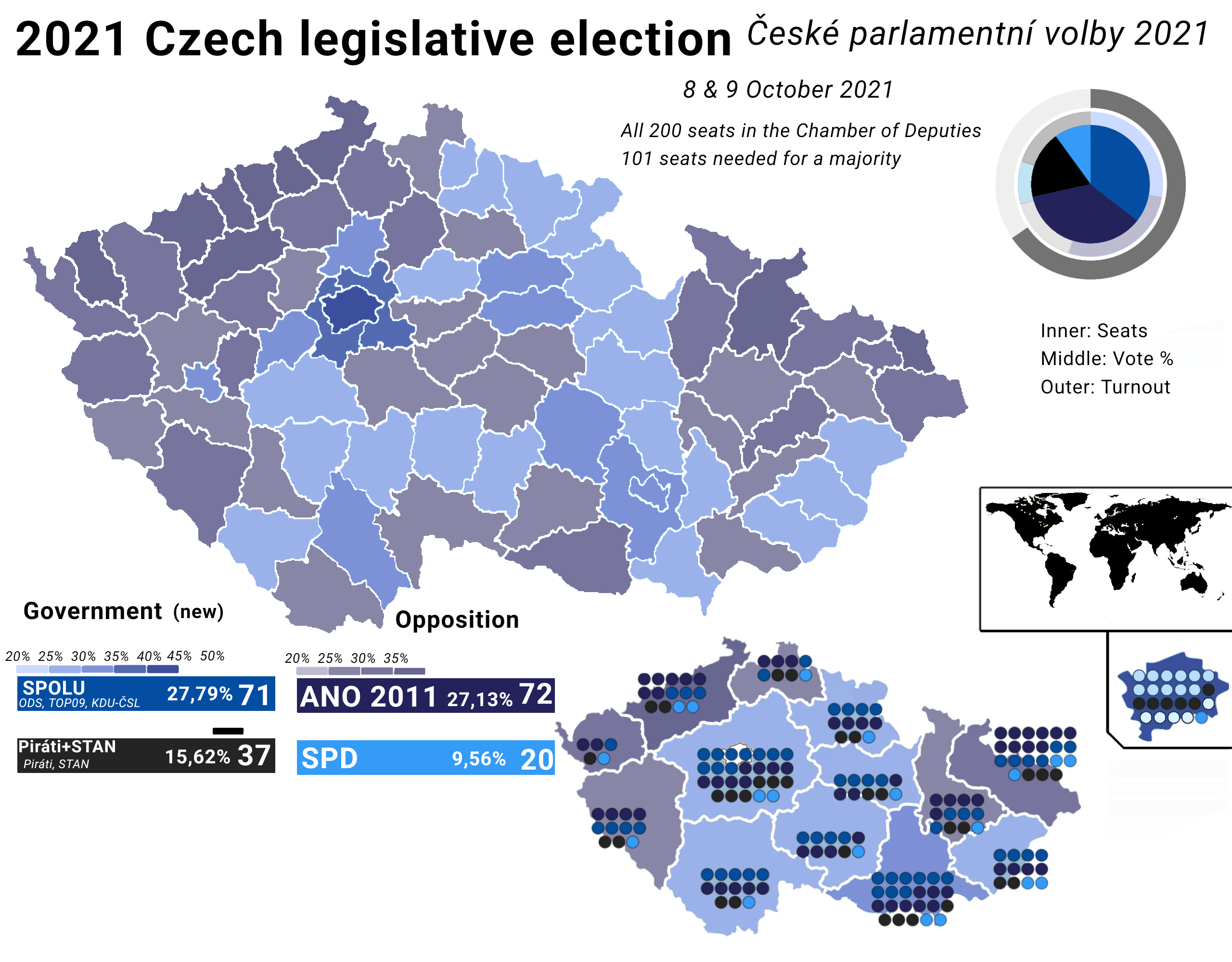
Results of the election

Party	Votes	%	+/–	Seats	+/–
Spolu	1,493,905	27.79	+5.36	71	+29
ANO	1,458,140	27.13	–2.51	72	–6
Pirates and Mayors	839,776	15.62	–0.36	37	+9
Freedom and Direct Democracy	513,910	9.56	–1.08	20	–2
Přísaha	251,562	4.68	New	0	New
Czech Social Democratic Party	250,397	4.66	–2.62	0	–15
Communist Party of Bohemia and Moravia	193,817	3.61	–4.16	0	–15
Tricolour–Svobodní–Soukromníci	148,463	2.76	+1.20	0	0
Free Bloc	71,587	1.33	New	0	New
Green Party	53,343	0.99	–0.47	0	0
We Will Open Czechia	21,804	0.41	New	0	New
Swiss Democracy	16,823	0.31	New	0	New
Moravané	14,285	0.27	New	0	New
Alliance for the Future	11,531	0.21	–0.11	0	0
Koruna Česká	8,635	0.16	New	0	New
Sources Movement	8,599	0.16	New	0	New
Urza.cz	6,775	0.13	New	0	New
Alliance of National Forces	5,167	0.10	+0.09	0	0
Pensioners 21	3,698	0.07	New	0	New
Moravian Land Movement	1,648	0.03	New	0	New
The Left	639	0.01	New	0	New
Right Bloc	586	0.01	+0.00	0	0
Total	5,375,090	100.00	–	200	0
Valid votes	5,375,090	99.32			
Invalid/blank votes	36,794	0.68			
Total votes	5,411,884	100.00			
Registered voters/turnout	8,275,752	65.39			
Source: Volby

Popular vote
SPOLU	27.79%
ANO	27.13%
PirStan	15.62%
SPD	9.56%
Přísaha	4.68%
ČSSD	4.66%
KSČM	3.61%
T–S–S	2.76%
VB	1.33%
Others	2.86%

Parliamentary seats
ANO	36.0%
SPOLU	35.5%
PirStan	18.5%
SPD	10.0%

=== Distribution of seats for individual parties ===

Results by parties
Party	Seats	+/–
ANO	72	−6
Civic Democratic Party	34	+9
Mayors and Independents	33	+27
KDU-ČSL	23	+13
Freedom and Direct Democracy	20	−2
TOP 09	14	+7
Czech Pirate Party	4	−18

=== MPs by party membership ===
Results by parties
Party	Seats	+/–
ANO	63	0
Civic Democratic Party	33	+10
Mayors and Independents	31	+25
Freedom and Direct Democracy	20	−2
KDU-ČSL	19	+9
Independents	15	−5
TOP 09	13	+7
Czech Pirate Party	4	−18
Mayors for the Liberec Region	1	+1
Non-Partisans	1	+1

=== Results by region ===
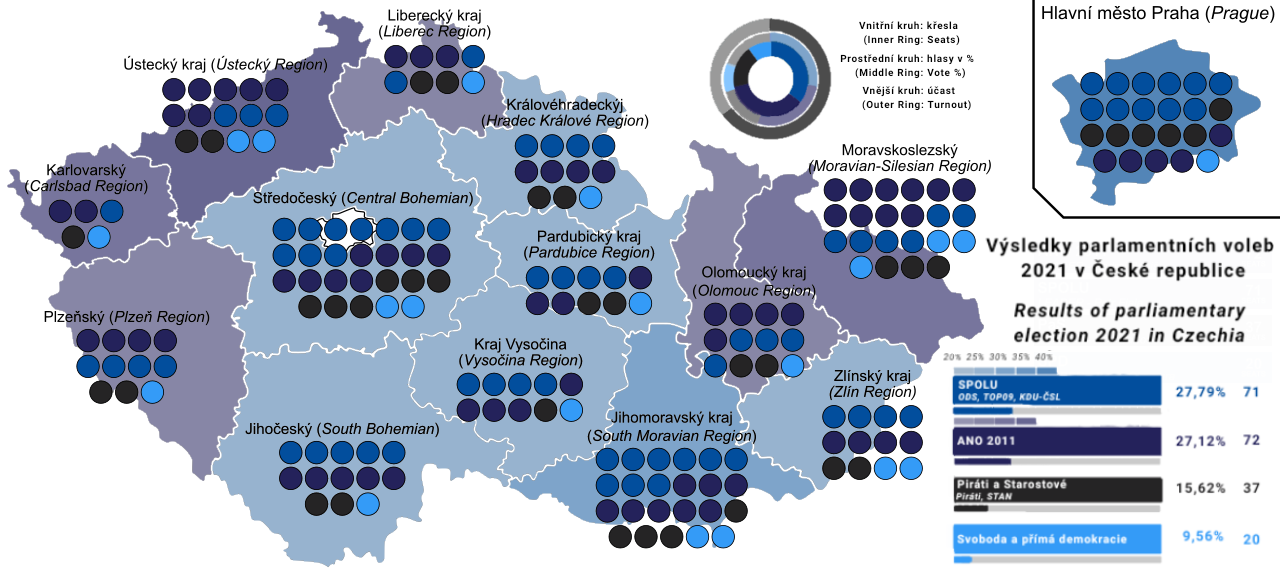
Winning party by region

% of votes
Region	SPOLU	ANO	PirStan	SPD	Přísaha	ČSSD	KSČM	Others	Turnout
Prague	40.0	17.5	22.6	4.6	3.4	4.0	2.1	5.8	70.2
Central Bohemia	28.7	24.9	19.5	7.8	4.6	4.6	3.5	6.4	68.0
South Bohemia	29.1	26.7	13.5	9.0	4.5	5.5	4.5	7.2	66.3
Plzeň	26.6	29.0	13.9	10.0	4.7	5.0	4.1	6.7	64.7
Karlovy Vary	20.2	33.1	14.2	12.8	4.9	3.8	3.4	7.6	57.1
Ústí nad Labem	19.8	35.6	14.0	11.9	4.4	3.2	3.9	7.2	57.7
Liberec	22.8	26.9	21.4	11.0	4.3	3.5	3.0	7.1	64.6
Hradec Králové	28.6	27.0	15.1	9.1	4.7	4.9	3.4	7.2	67.9
Pardubice	28.5	26.8	14.1	9.4	5.0	5.1	3.8	7.3	67.9
Vysočina	28.0	26.7	13.5	8.9	5.2	6.7	4.7	6.3	68.9
South Moravia	30.0	25.4	14.2	9.4	6.0	4.4	3.7	6.9	66.4
Olomouc	24.5	29.8	12.4	12.2	4.7	4.5	4.0	7.9	64.7
Zlín	27.8	27.0	13.4	11.4	4.2	4.9	3.3	8.0	67.4
Moravia-Silesia	20.6	33.7	11.1	12.8	4.9	5.4	4.0	7.5	60.6
Czech Republic	27.8	27.1	15.6	9.6	4.7	4.7	3.6	6.9	65.4

Seats with coalitions
Region	ANO	SPOLU	PirStan	SPD	All
Prague	5	11	6	1	23
Central Bohemia	8	10	6	2	26
South Bohemia	5	5	2	1	13
Plzeň	4	4	2	1	11
Karlovy Vary	2	1	1	1	5
Ústí nad Labem	7	3	2	2	14
Liberec	3	2	2	1	8
Hradec Králové	4	4	2	1	11
Pardubice	3	4	2	1	10
Vysočina	4	4	1	1	10
South Moravia	8	9	4	2	23
Olomouc	5	4	2	1	12
Zlín	4	4	2	2	12
Moravia-Silesia	10	6	3	3	22
Czech Republic	72	71	37	20	200

Seats with single parties
Kraj	ANO	ODS	STAN	KDU-ČSL	SPD	TOP 09	Piráti	All
Prague	5	6	4	2	1	3	2	23
Central Bohemia	8	6	5	1	2	3	1	26
South Bohemia	5	2	2	2	1	1	N/A	13
Plzeň	4	2	2	N/A	1	2	N/A	11
Karlovy Vary	2	1	1	N/A	1	N/A	N/A	5
Ústí nad Labem	7	2	1	N/A	2	1	1	14
Liberec	3	2	2	N/A	1	N/A	N/A	8
Hradec Králové	4	2	2	1	1	1	N/A	11
Pardubice	3	1	2	2	1	1	N/A	10
Vysočina	4	1	1	2	1	1	N/A	10
South Moravia	8	4	4	4	2	1	N/A	23
Olomouc	5	1	2	3	1	N/A	N/A	12
Zlín	4	1	2	3	2	N/A	N/A	12
Moravia-Silesia	10	3	3	3	3	N/A	N/A	22
Czech Republic	72	34	33	23	20	14	4	200

=== Results by district ===
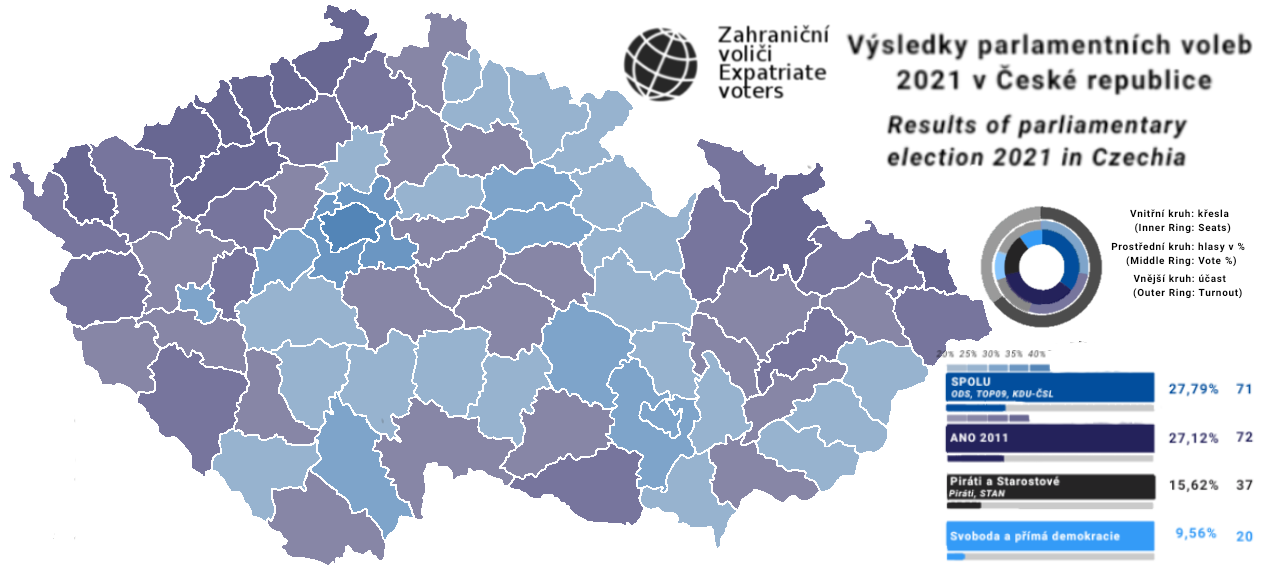
Results of the election by districts.

SPOLU

ANO

PirStan

SPD

Přísaha

ČSSD

KSČM

Turnout

Turnout by district compared with national turnout.

=== Voters abroad ===
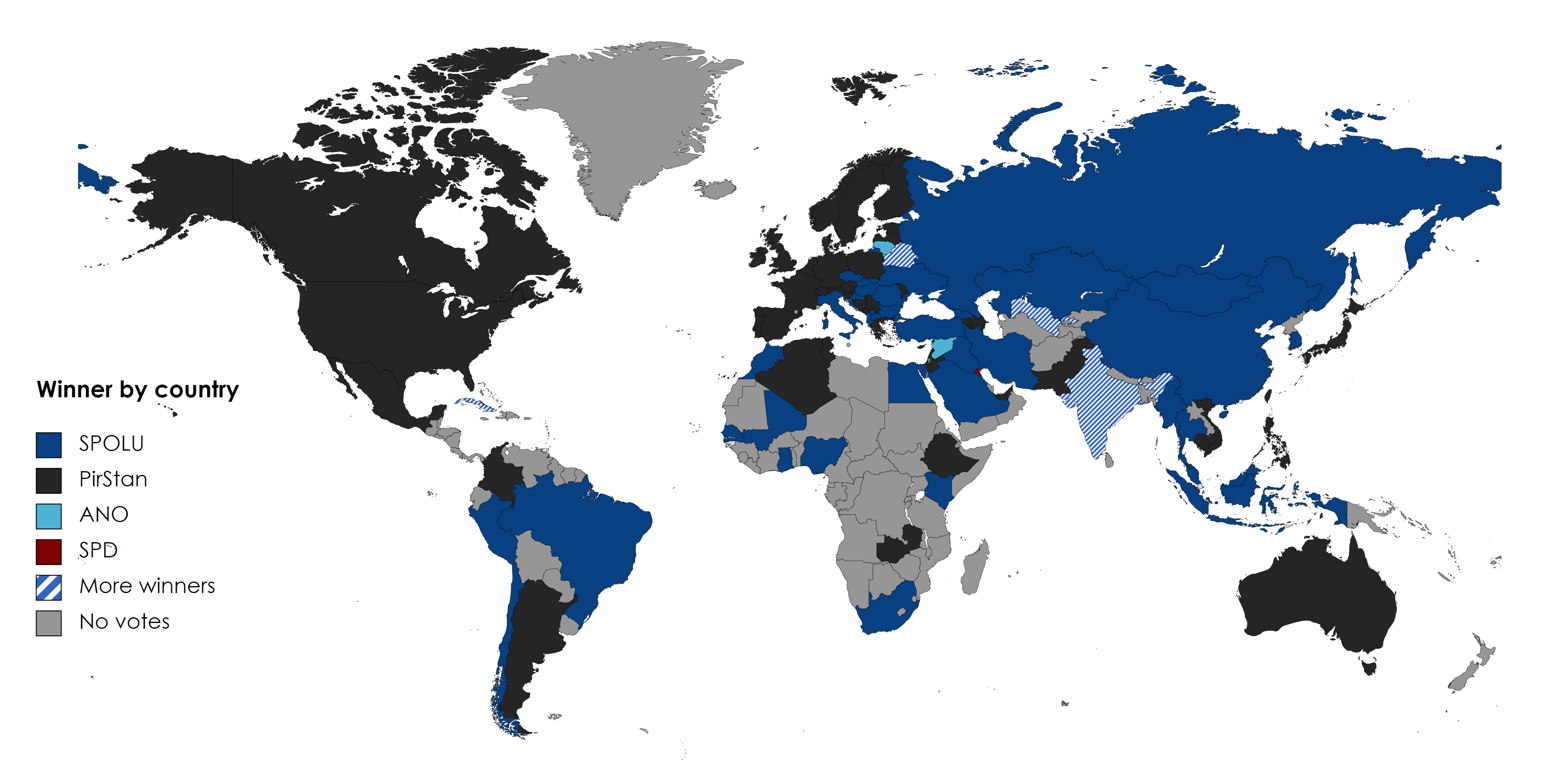
2021 Czech parliamentary election results by country.

Results
Party	Votes	%
Pirates and Mayors	6,654	50.47%
SPOLU	4,517	34.26%
ANO	659	4.99%
Freedom and Direct Democracy	289	2.19%
Green Party	245	1.86%
Tricolour–Svobodní–Soukromníci	212	1.61%
Přísaha	211	1.60%
Czech Social Democratic Party	201	1.53%
Free Bloc	68	0.52%
Communist Party of Bohemia and Moravia	50	0.38%
Swiss Democracy	19	0.14%
Czech Crown	17	0.13%
We Will Open Czechia	11	0.08%
Alliance of National Forces	9	0.07%
Sources Movement	9	0.07%
Alliance for the Future	7	0.05%
Urza.cz	6	0.05%

=== Voter demographics ===
Voter demographics by PAQ Research
Social group	SPOLU	ANO	PirStan	SPD	Přísaha	ČSSD	KSČM	T–S–S	Free Bloc	Greens	Others
Total Vote	27.8	27.1	15.6	9.6	4.7	4.7	3.6	2.8	1.3	1.0	2.0
Age
18–34	31	13	33	9	3	3	1	3	1	1	2
35–44	34	15	21	10	6	3	2	4	1	1	2
45–54	31	21	12	13	7	6	2	3	1	2	1
55–64	26	32	7	12	7	4	3	4	2	1	2
65+	18	47	6	7	3	7	8	2	1	0	2
Education
Basic	22	30	17	11	4	3	6	1	0	1	5
High without Matura	17	38	7	16	6	5	4	3	2	1	1
High with Matura	29	25	17	8	4	5	4	3	1	1	3
University	40	16	22	4	4	4	2	4	1	2	1
Education and Age
Without Matura 18–34	25	12	26	17	6	5	1	3	1	0	4
Without Matura 35–54	22	24	12	21	7	4	5	4	1	2	1
Without Matura 55+	14	49	4	12	4	5	7	3	2	0	3
With Matura 18–34	34	13	36	6	0	2	1	4	1	2	2
With Matura 35–54	38	15	19	7	7	5	2	4	1	1	2
With Matura 55+	27	35	9	6	4	7	6	3	0	1	2
Gender and Age
Women 18–34	25	15	35	8	2	4	2	4	1	1	3
Women 35–54	29	20	20	10	6	6	2	2	1	2	2
Women 55+	19	42	7	9	5	6	5	3	1	0	3
Men 18–34	36	11	32	9	3	3	1	2	0	1	2
Men 35–54	36	16	13	14	7	3	3	4	1	1	2
Men 55+	23	41	6	8	4	6	7	3	1	1	2
Working Status
Employed	31	19	18	11	6	5	3	3	1	1	2
Self-employed	39	14	19	11	3	3	1	5	1	1	2
Students	34	11	40	4	2	1	1	3	1	2	3
Parental Leave	29	14	26	13	4	5	2	3	2	1	2
Pensioners	17	47	6	8	4	6	7	2	1	0	3
Unemployed	21	29	20	11	4	6	2	5	0	2	0
Others	23	20	17	17	4	1	7	2	6	0	4
Working Status and Income
Unemployed in Poverty	24	22	18	14	5	5	3	5	1	1	2
Employed with income below median	30	16	20	13	6	5	2	4	2	1	2
Employed with income over median	36	20	18	9	6	5	2	3	1	1	2
Pensioners	17	47	6	8	4	6	7	2	1	0	3
Others	30	12	29	12	3	1	2	4	1	2	4
Vaccination and Age
Vaccinated 18–34	36	13	36	4	3	1	1	3	0	1	3
Vaccinated 35–54	38	20	16	8	5	5	2	2	0	1	1
Vaccinated 55+	22	44	8	4	4	6	6	2	0	0	4
Unvaccinated 18–34	22	7	32	17	4	4	2	6	4	0	2
Unvaccinated 35–54	24	10	19	16	6	3	3	9	5	3	3
Unvaccinated 55+	18	25	3	22	3	5	5	5	10	1	5

Voter demographics by STEM/Mark
Social group	SPOLU	ANO	PirStan	SPD	Přísaha	ČSSD	KSČM	T–S–S	Others
Total Vote	27.8	27.1	15.6	9.6	4.7	4.7	3.6	2.8	4.3
Gender
Men	24	27	18	12	4	5	4	4	2
Women	25	29	18	8	5	5	3	2	5
Age
18–29	34	10	34	7	2	3	2	3	3
30–44	25	17	25	11	5	4	2	5	7
45–59	29	20	14	17	5	3	3	5	3
60+	19	44	10	7	5	7	6	1	2
Education
Without Matura	17	35	11	15	4	4	6	3	3
With Matura	27	25	22	7	4	5	2	3	4
University	34	17	22	6	5	7	3	2	3
By the size of village/town
999 and less	18	31	17	8	5	7	6	2	6
1,000–4,999	23	30	20	10	3	4	4	4	2
5,000–19,999	27	24	15	9	7	7	3	3	4
20,000–99,999	23	27	19	11	4	6	4	4	3
100,000 and more	31	25	18	11	4	2	2	3	3
Working Status
Employed	25	19	21	14	5	4	2	5	4
Self-employed	47	17	19	6	3	0	2	2	5
Students	38	9	38	1	2	5	0	3	4
Pensioners	17	45	9	6	5	7	7	1	2
Unemployed/House	21	22	25	17	2	3	3	2	6

Voter demographics by STEM
Social group	SPOLU	ANO	PirStan	SPD	Přísaha	ČSSD	KSČM
Total Vote	27.8	27.1	15.6	9.6	4.7	4.7	3.6
By the size of village/town
1,000 and less	24.5	29.3	13.3	10.8	5.3	5.4	4.9
1,000 – 1,999	26.4	28.3	14	10.4	5.1	4.6	4
2,000 – 4,999	26.4	28.5	13.9	10.5	4.8	4.7	3.9
5,000 – 19,999	26.3	28.5	14.7	10.1	4.9	4.9	3.7
20,000 – 49,999	24.3	30	14.1	11	4.6	4.9	3.8
50,000 – 89,999	21.7	33	12.7	11.7	4.8	5.2	3.8
90,000 and more	29.4	25.9	17.8	8.4	4.4	4.1	3

=== MPs with highest number of preferential votes ===
Number	MP	Party	Region	Votes
1.	Vít Rakušan	STAN	Central Bohemia	59,792 (43.47%)
2.	Markéta Pekarová Adamová	TOP 09	Prague	49,074 (19.54%)
3.	Petr Fiala	ODS	South Moravia	38,555 (20.56%)
4.	Andrej Babiš	ANO (political party)	Ústí nad Labem	38,277 (28.49%)
5.	Jana Černochová	ODS	Prague	35,583 (14.17%)
6.	Olga Richterová	Piráti	Prague	32,888 (23.14%)
7.	Pavel Žáček	ODS	Prague	31,347 (12.48%)
8.	Martin Kupka	ODS	Central Bohemia	30,286 (14.91%)
9.	Bohuslav Svoboda	ODS	Prague	29,033 (11.56%)
10.	Ondřej Lochman	STAN	Central Bohemia	27,656 (20.10%)
11.	Ondřej Kolář	TOP 09	Prague	27,259 (10.85%)
12.	Jan Lacina	STAN	Prague	26,117 (18.37%)
13.	Věra Kovářová	STAN	Central Bohemia	25,367 (18.44%)
14.	Hayato Okamura	KDU-ČSL	Prague	24,426 (9.72%)
15.	Marek Benda	ODS	Prague	23,164 (9.22%)
16.	Alena Schillerová	ANO (political party)	South Moravia	22,968 (14.50%)
17.	Jan Skopeček	ODS	Central Bohemia	22,950 (11.30%)
18.	Karel Havlíček	ANO (political party)	Central Bohemia	22,592 (12.82%)
19.	Vladimír Balaš	STAN	Prague	21,241 (14.94%)
20.	Barbora Urbanová	STAN	Central Bohemia	19,969 (14.51%)

=== MPs who lost their seats ===
164 incumbents stood in the election but only 98 of them were reelected.

Party	Name	Region	Year became MP	Note
ANO (political party)	Margita Balaštíková	Zlín	2013	She later became MP once again when Radim Holiš resigned on his seat.
ANO (political party)	Irena Blažková	Olomouc	2020 (surrogate)	
ANO (political party)	Andrea Brzobohatá	Central Bohemia		
ANO (political party)	Josef Hájek	Moravia-Silesia	2013	
ANO (political party)	Adam Kalous	Olomouc	2017	
ANO (political party)	Barbora Kořanová	Plzeň		
ANO (political party)	Jaroslav Kytýr	Pardubice	2017	
ANO (political party)	Milan Pour	Central Bohemia		
ANO (political party)	Pavel Plzák	Hradec Králové	2013	
ANO (political party)	Věra Procházková	Karlovy Vary	2017	
ANO (political party)	Jan Řehounek	Pardubice	2017	
ANO (political party)	Miroslav Samaš	Central Bohemia		
Civic Democratic Party	Libor Hoppe	South Moravia	2021 (surrogate)	
Civic Democratic Party	Jaroslav Martinů	Pardubice	2010	
Piráti	Dana Balcarová	Prague	2017	
Piráti	Lukáš Bartoň	Plzeň	2017	
Piráti	Lukáš Černohorský	Moravia-Silesia	2017	
Piráti	František Elfmark	Zlín	2017	
Piráti	Mikuláš Ferjenčík	Pardubice	2017	
Piráti	Radek Holomčík	South Moravia	2017	
Piráti	Martin Jiránek	Hradec Králové	2017	
Piráti	Lukáš Kolářík	South Bohemia	2017	
Piráti	František Kopřiva	Central Bohemia	2017	
Piráti	Jan Lipavský	Central Bohemia	2017	
Piráti	Tomáš Martínek	Liberec	2017	
Piráti	František Navrkal	Ústí nad Labem	2019 (surrogate)	
Piráti	Vojtěch Pikal	Olomouc	2017	Deputy Speaker of the Chamber of Deputies.
Piráti	Ondřej Polanský	Moravia-Silesia	2017	
Piráti	Jan Pošvář	Vysočina	2017	
Piráti	Ondřej Profant	Prague	2017	
Piráti	Petr Třešňák	Karlovy Vary	2017	
Piráti	Tomáš Vymazal	South Moravia	2017	
SPD	Jaroslav Holík	Karlovy Vary	2017	
SPD	Zdeněk Podal	Hradec Králové	2017	
SPD	Miloslav Rozner	South Bohemia	2017	
SPD	Josef Nerušil	Prague	2017	
KSČM	Hana Aulická Jírovcová	Ústí nad Labem	2013	
KSČM	Jiří Dolejš	Prague	2002	
KSČM	Vojtěch Filip	South Bohemia	2002	Leader of the party.
KSČM	Stanislav Grospič	Central Bohemia	2002	
KSČM	Leo Luzar	Moravia-Silesia	2014	
KSČM	Květa Matušovská	Pardubice	2010	
KSČM	Zdeněk Ondráček	Hradec Králové	2013	
KSČM	Daniel Pawlas	Moravia-Silesia	2017	
KSČM	Marie Pěnčíková	Zlín	2018 (surrogate)	
KSČM	Ivo Pojezný	South Moravia	2013	
KSČM	Jiří Valenta	Plzeň	2013	
KSČM	Miloslava Vostrá	Central Bohemia	2013	
ČSSD	Jiří Běhounek	Vysočina	2013	
ČSSD	Jan Birke	Hradec Králové	2013	
ČSSD	Jan Chvojka	Pardubice	2010	
ČSSD	Jan Hamáček	Central Bohemia	2006	Leader of the party.
ČSSD	Tomáš Hanzel	Moravia-Silesia	2017	
ČSSD	Alena Gajdůšková	Zlín	2017	
ČSSD	Roman Onderka	South Moravia	2017	
ČSSD	Lukáš Vágner	South Moravia	2021 (surrogate)	
ČSSD	Kateřina Valachová	South Bohemia	2017	
ČSSD	Ondřej Veselý	South Bohemia	2010	
ČSSD	Lubomír Zaorálek	Moravia-Silesia	1996	
Tricolour	Tereza Hyťhová	Ústí nad Labem	2017	Originally elected for the Freedom and Direct Democracy.
Tricolour	Zuzana Majerová Zahradníková	Olomouc	2017	Originally elected for the Civic Democratic Party.
Free Bloc	Marian Bojko	Moravia-Silesia	2017	Originally elected for the Freedom and Direct Democracy.
Free Bloc	Lubomír Volný	Moravia-Silesia	2017	Originally elected for the Freedom and Direct Democracy.

== Aftermath ==
=== Analysis ===
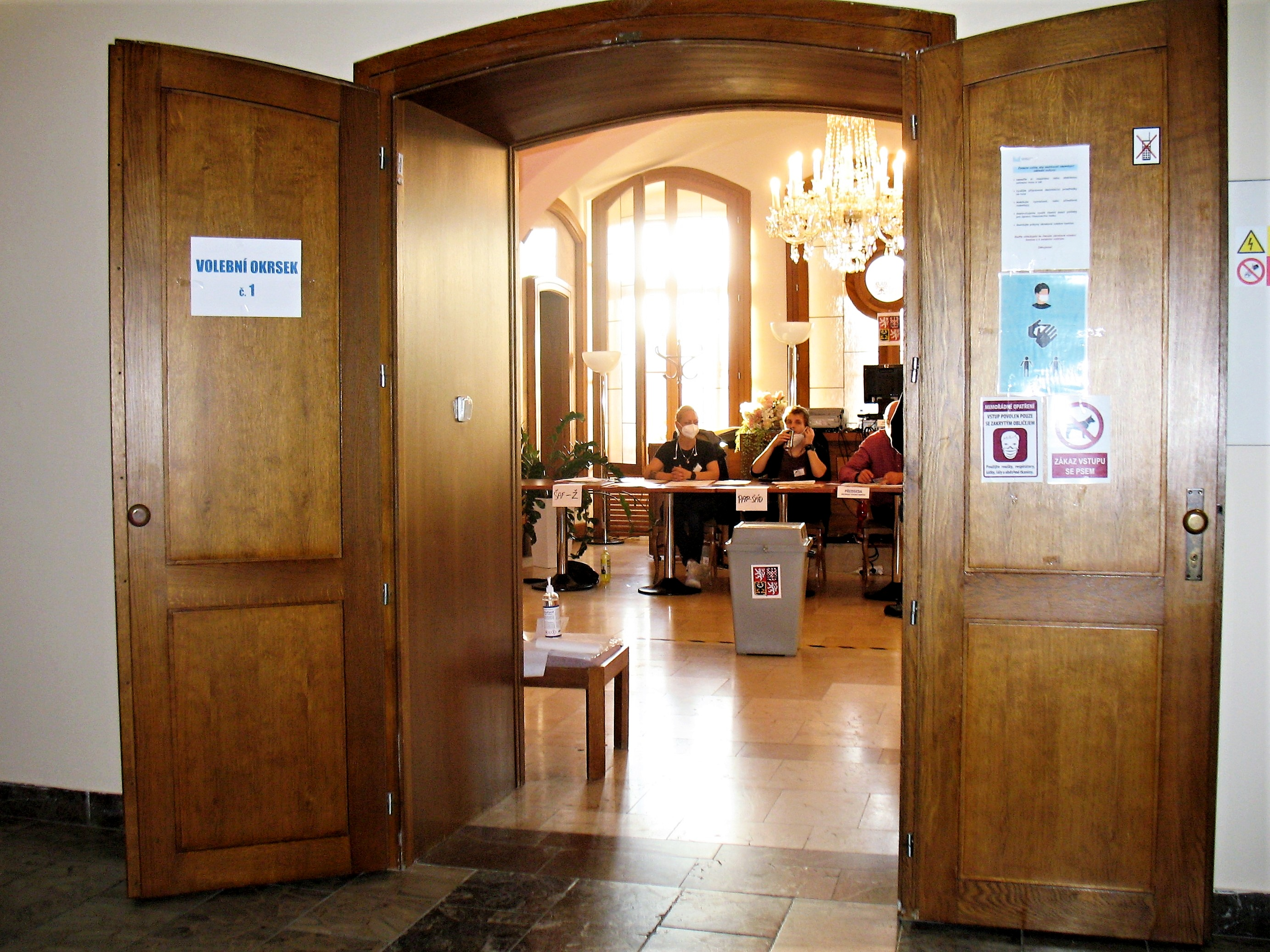
Polling station Česká Lípa

The electoral coalition Spolu won the most votes but finished with one fewer seat (71) in the Chamber of Deputies than ANO, which won 72 with a lower vote share. ANO had the largest number of deputies of any party, winning twice as many seats as the second place Civic Democratic Party (ODS). The Pirates and Mayors (PirStan) electoral coalition came third with 37 seats. Due to preference voting, Mayors and Independents won 33 seats and the Czech Pirate Party won just 4 seats. Freedom and Direct Democracy (SPD) came fourth, and were the only other political party or electoral coalition to be elected to the Chamber. The election saw the highest ever number of discarded votes for parties not meeting the 5% threshold in the history of elections in the Czech Republic, with more than 1 million, or about 20%. The Czech Social Democratic Party and the Communist Party of Bohemia and Moravia failed to win any seats in the lower chamber for the first time since 1990, and the respective party leaders Jan Hamáček and Vojtěch Filip resigned. For the first time since the Third Czechoslovak Republic, a Communist party would not be represented in the national parliament covering the Czech lands.

Political analyst Jiří Pehe of the New York University in Prague hailed the results as a "triumph for liberal democracy" and said they "signalled the end of the post-Communist era". Political analyst Michal Klima told public Czech Television that the result meant "an absolute change of the politics in the Czech Republic. It stabilises the country's position in the West camp. It's a huge defeat for [Babiš]."

The media considered the result a surprise and an upset, as polls had shown ANO as the clear front-runner. Spolu were polling second but the last polls showed a surge in support, but it was still expected that they would lose. Martin Buchtík, Director of the STEM polling agency, said he thought it would be impossible that ANO would not receive the highest number of votes. Director of Median, Přemysl Čech, said it was unlikely that Spolu would be first. The Director of Kantar, Pavel Ranocha, also said he believed ANO would be first, but noted that the latest data showed that gap between ANO and Spolu narrowing. The directors of all three major polling agencies agreed that Pirates and Mayors had no chance of defeating ANO and also agreed that only ANO, Spolu, Pirates and Mayors, and SPD could be certain of winning seats in the Chamber of Deputies, as KSČM, ČSSD, and Přísaha were all hovering around the 5% threshold. Spolu's victory in the election, against polling evidence, was attributed to a "last minute swing". Sociologist Jan Herzmann said that large number of voters had changed their mind in the last moments, which could not be detected by opinion polls. He argued that in the last week running up to the election it had become clear that Petr Fiala was an equal opponent to Prime Minister Andrej Babiš, and competition between the two men led voters of smaller parties to switch to Spolu or ANO, leading to disappointing results for Pirates and Mayors and SPD. Ranocha said that undecided voters were still deciding between Spolu or Pirates and Mayors, and Spolu were ahead in the polls. He also said that a large number of voters decided to support Spolu due to the television debates. Journalist Jan Horák of Aktuálně.cz said that Spolu were competing with Pirates and Mayors to be the main opposition option, but opinion polls showed Spolu as the stronger of the two, which won them votes. He also noted that Fiala was more acceptable than Pirate leader Ivan Bartoš. Political scientist Lubomír Kopeček said that inflation and the Pandora Papers affair may have contributed to ANO's defeat.

The newly elected Chamber of Deputies had the highest ever representation of women, with 50 female MPs. PirStan had the highest representation of women, with 35% of MPs being female. The average age of elected MPs was 50 years, with Bohuslav Svoboda at the oldest at 77 years, and Ondřej Babka the youngest at 27 years old.

On 12 November 2021, STEM published a poll conducted from 15 to 25 October 2021. According to the poll, 61% of PirStan supporters were Pirate Party supporters, while 39% supported STAN. However, 58% of STAN supporters used preferential voting, compared to only 29% of Pirate Party supporters, resulting in a large difference in seat distribution between the two parties. According to the poll, 49% of Spolu voters were supporters of ODS, 26% of TOP 09, and 25% of KDU-ČSL. 47% of KDU-ČSL supporters, 44% of ODS supporters and 35% of TOP 09 supporters used preferential voting.

=== Complaints ===
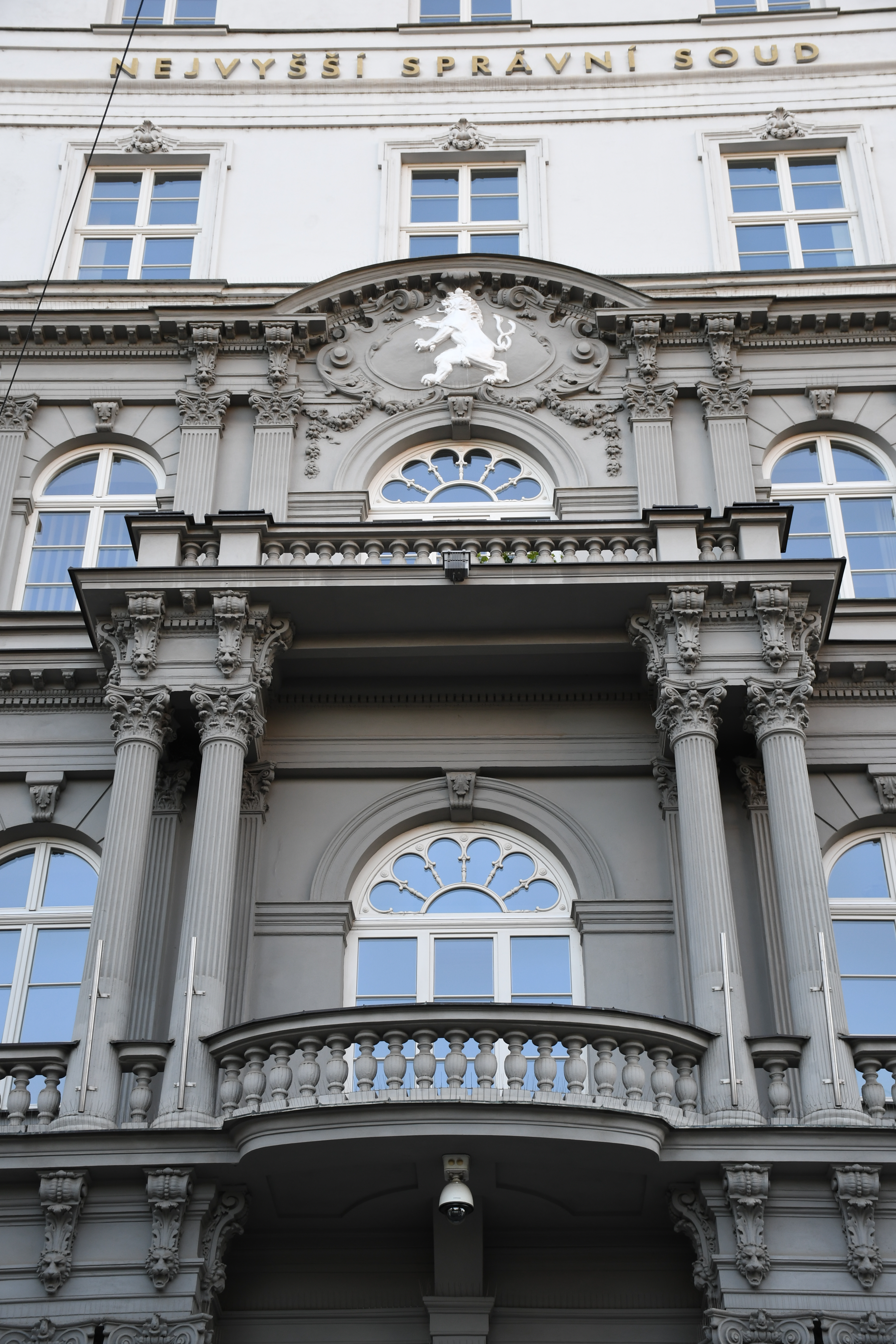
Supreme Administrative Court received record number of complaints.

The Supreme Administrative Court received 210 complaints about election irregularities, three times more than in 2017. Many complaints were directed at Czech Television, stating that its election coverage benefitted some parties. Others attacked the electoral coalitions and the rule of wearing masks at polling stations.

It was reported on 22 October 2021 that the Pirates and Mayors had lodged a complaint stating that the Czech Statistical Bureau misinterpreted the electoral law, resulting in an incorrect allocation of seats. If the complaint was successful, ANO would lose one seat to Pirates and Mayors. The deadline to respond to complaints was 11 November 2021. Another complaint that received media attention was made by Zdeněk Černý, who was due to run as a candidate for SPOLU in South Moravia before his candidacy was withdrawn in the last moments before the election. Černý argued his withdrawal was illegal and wanted to invalidate the election of all SPOLU candidates in South Moravia to recount the preferential votes.

On 5 November 2021, the Supreme Administrative Court rejected all complaints, including those made by Pirates and Mayors and by Zdeněk Černý. It stated that Pirates and Mayors had misunderstood the electoral law. On 8 December 2021, Pirates and Mayors sent a complaint to Constitutional Court seeking to repeal the decision by the Supreme Administrative Court. On 26 January 2022, the Constitutional Court rejected the complaint for procedural reasons.

=== Government formation ===
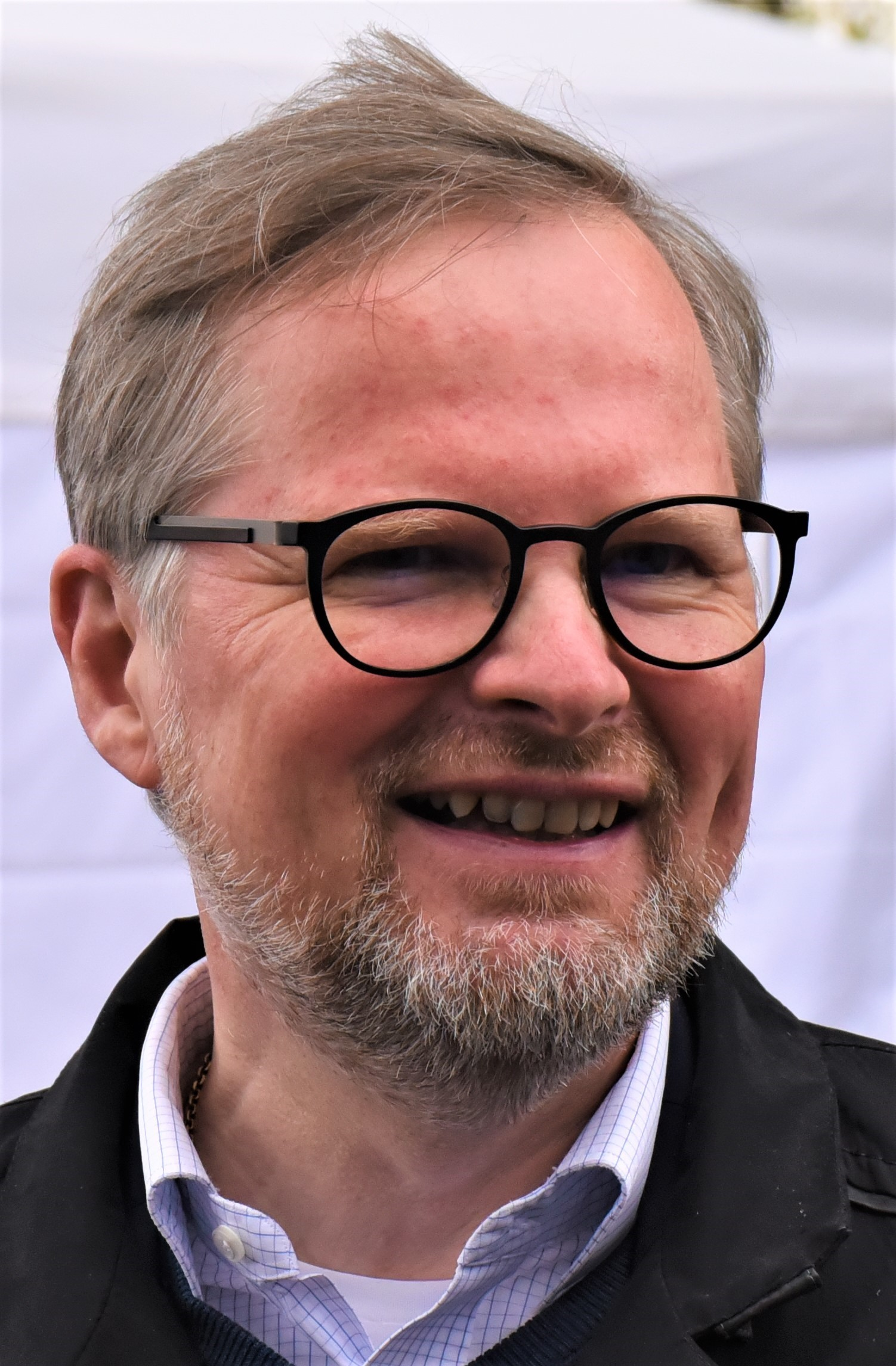
Leader of SPOLU, Petr Fiala

Incumbent prime minister Andrej Babiš conceded defeat and accepted the results of the vote on the night of 9 October, saying: "That's life. We understand and accept that." Babiš also accused the opposition of a "smear campaign" during the lead-up to the election. Incumbent president Miloš Zeman had indicated that he would give the prime ministerial mandate to the candidate of the largest party, not the largest coalition. Babiš described ANO's performance as a great result, but said he was not expecting a loss. He congratulated the chairman of SPOLU for becoming the largest coalition, and said that he was open to talks with all parties who were going to enter the new parliament, except for PirStan, which he ruled out. PirStan said they would not join or support an ANO-led government, or a government that included SPD, calling them "parties with a corrupt past" (ANO) or parties "threatening liberal democracy" (SPD).

SPD ruled out joining a coalition government with ANO but indicated that they were open to exploratory talks with ANO about providing direct or indirect support to an ANO-led minority government. SPD leader Tomio Okamura said in a press conference that passing a new law to allow national referendums, including on Czexit and possibly NATO membership, was his condition for supporting Babiš' campaign for a second term in office. Babiš left the door open to possible cooperation with SPD but indicated that this was not his first choice as he rejected a referendum on EU membership. After results showed that a potential ANO–SPD majority was mathematically impossible, Babiš indicated his willingness to form a grand coalition with SPOLU, if he were to be asked first by Zeman. Petr Just, a political scientist at the Metropolitan University Prague, said many in ODS were open to forming a government with ANO, as long as Babiš was not part of the government, while many in ANO preferred an alliance with ODS instead of SPD. Spolu ruled this scenario out, especially if Babiš continued as prime minister.

After the results, Spolu and PirStan signed a memorandum to form a coalition government with Petr Fiala as prime minister. Both groups said they would not work with Babiš. Petr Fiala said: "The two democratic coalitions (SPOLU and Pirates and Mayors) have gained a majority and have a chance to form a majority government. We are the change. You are the change." PirStan leader Ivan Bartoš said talks with SPOLU "on the possibilities of forming a new government" would likely begin on 9 October. He hailed the end of the "dominance of Andrej Babiš", and said that "the democratic parties have shown that the era of chaos will probably be behind us."

On 10 October, Zeman was hospitalized, creating uncertainty over how and when the government formation talks would be held. On 11 October, a spokesman for the hospital said that Zeman's condition had stabilized, stating: "The reason for [Zeman's] hospitalization is complications from the illnesses for which he has been receiving treatment." On 15 October, Babis announced that he was prepared to go into opposition and would not accept an offer to try to create a new government, commenting: "We will hand it over to the new coalition and we will be in opposition." On 18 October, Miloš Vystrčil, the President of the Senate of the Czech Republic, announced he had received a letter from the Central Military Hospital declaring Zeman unfit to fulfil his duties as the president, and indicated that he planned to trigger Article 66 of the constitution to remove Zeman from office. In response, the Senate announced their intention to transfer Zeman's constitutional powers to the current prime minister, Andrej Babiš, and the speaker of the Chamber of Deputies. The Speaker is expected to ask Fiala to form a government if Article 66 is triggered.

On 2 November, Spolu and PirStan agreed on the composition of the new government. SPOLU would have the Prime Minister and 10 ministers, while PirStan would have six ministers. Ministries held by Spolu include Finance, Labour and Social affairs, Defence, Transportation, Health, Agriculture, Justice, Environment, Culture and Science. PirStan would get the minister for the Interior, Industry, Education, Local development, Foreign affairs, Legislature and European Union. The signature of the coalition agreement was set for 8 November.

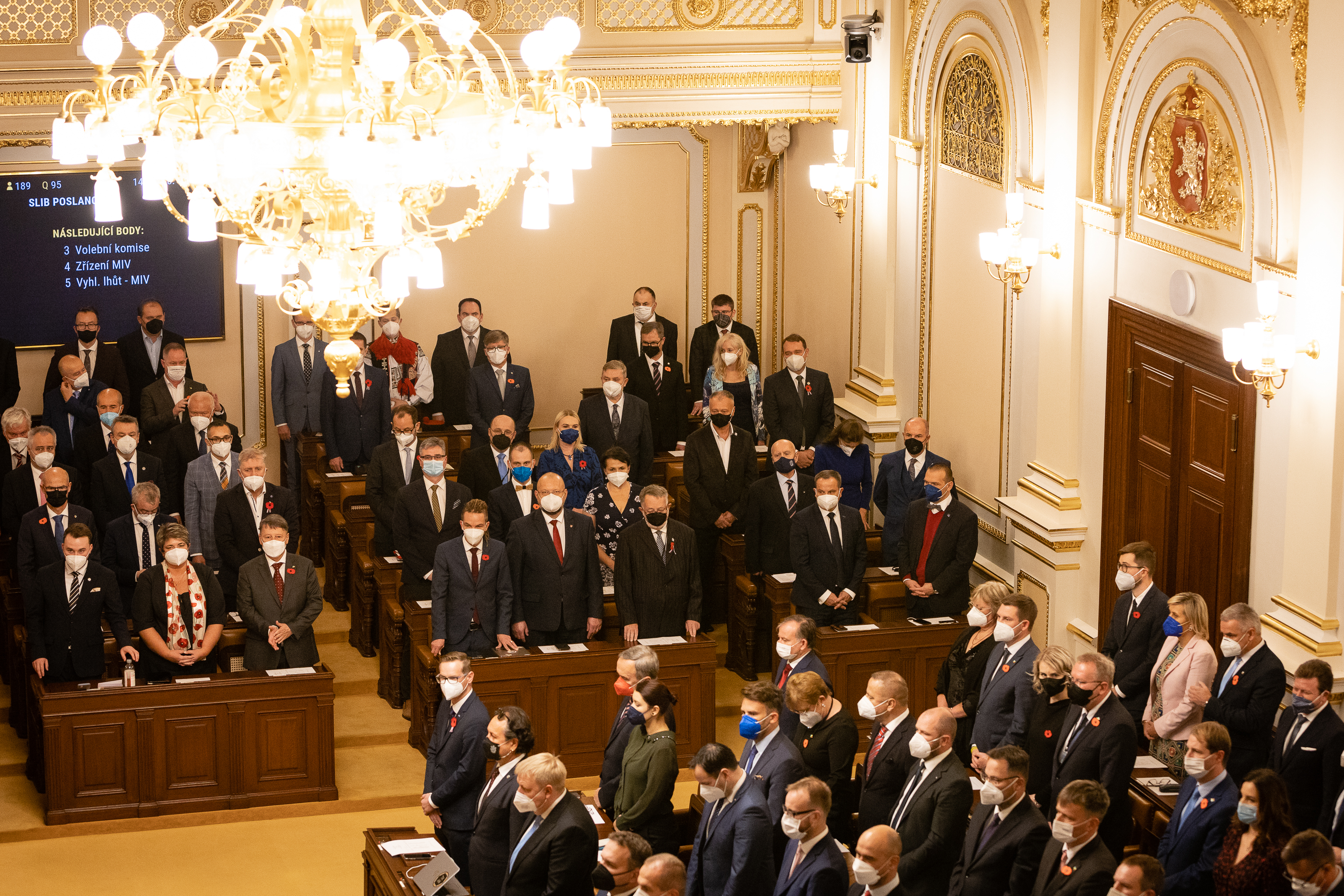
Constituent meeting on 8 November 2021

Fiala also said that he had been contacted by Zeman's staff on the same day, to say that the President was looking forward to meeting him, and intended to do so once he got transferred from the intensive care unit room to a normal room. On 4 November, Zeman was transferred to a normal room. On 5 November, Zeman confirmed during an interview for Frekvence 1 that he would appoint Fiala the new prime minister, and would do everything he could for the new government to be formed as quickly as possible.

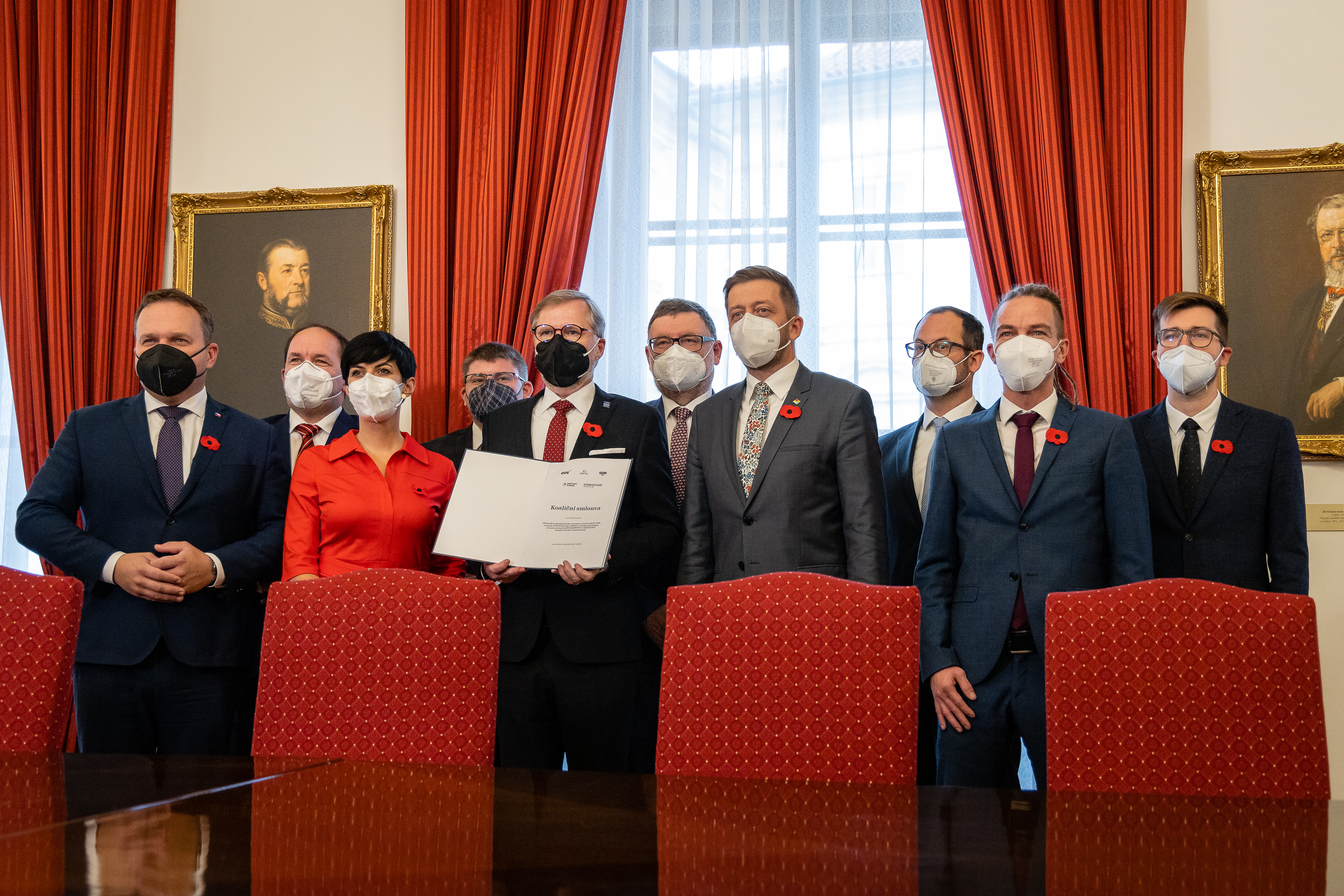
Coalition agreement was signed on 8 November 2021

ODS and STAN approved the coalition agreement on 4 November. KDU-ČSL and TOP 09 approved the agreement on 5 November. The Czech Pirate Party announced that its members would vote on approving the agreement on 13 and 14 November. The leadership of the Pirate Party approved the agreement on 7 November. As a result, Bartoš signed the agreement along with the leaders of the other parties on 8 November, even though party members were still to vote. The leaders of all five parties signed the coalition agreement on 8 November. The new Chamber of Deputies had its constituent meeting the same day. Babiš promised that his cabinet would resign soon afterward to allow a new government to be formed quickly. On 9 November, Zeman asked Fiala to form a government. The constituent meeting concluded on 10 November and the government resigned the day after. Zeman accepted the resignation the same day. Zeman's Chancellor Vratislav Mynář stated that Fiala would be appointed in a matter of weeks, after the President had met Fiala and the Ministerial candidates.

On 12 November, a referendum began among Pirate Party members over whether to approve the coalition agreement. MP Jakub Michálek, who was expected to become Minister for Legislation, announced that he would not be part of the incoming government to avoid the cumulation of jobs, adding that he believed it could convince more members to vote for the government. The referendum concluded on 15 November. 82% of party members agreed that the party should join the incoming government. Fiala was set to meet President Zeman on 17 November to present his cabinet and proposed government ministers.

=== Presidential approval ===
Fiala met Zeman on 17 November and presented him with the names of his proposed cabinet. Zeman stated that he would appoint Fiala as the new prime minister on 26 November, but expressed his disagreement with one potential minister, reported in Czech media to be Jan Lipavský, the candidate for Minister of Foreign Affairs. Fiala stated afterwards that he did not intend to make any changes to his cabinet. On 25 November 2021, Zeman tested positive for COVID-19, delaying the appointment until 28 November 2021. Zeman said he would meet Fiala's nominations for cabinet positions over the next two weeks. Outgoing Prime Minister Andrej Babiš said he expected the rest of the cabinet to be appointed after 13 December 2021. Following his appointment, Fiala said he believed his government would bring change and improve the lives of people in the Czech Republic, but that the next year would be difficult for many citizens and the Czech Republic itself.

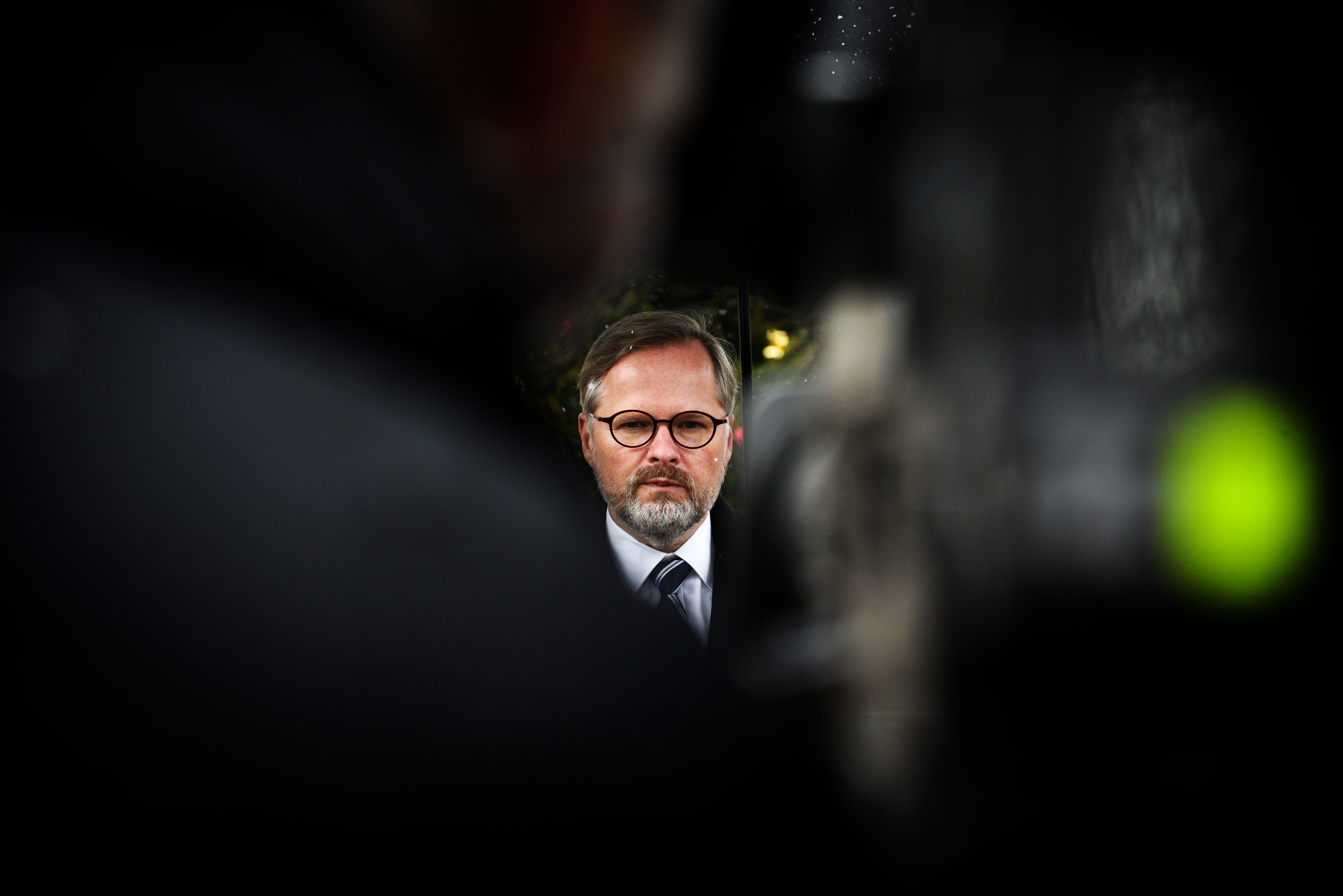
Fiala after his appointment.

Zeman started meeting the ministerial nominees on 29 November 2021, when he met Martin Baxa and Mikuláš Bek. On 7 December 2021, he met Jan Lipavský, reported as the potential minister Zeman did not want to appoint. According to sources cited by Frekvence 1, Zeman told Lipavský to withdraw his nomination. Fiala subsequently declared that if Zeman did not appoint all of his ministers, he would submit a jurisdiction action to the Constitutional Court against Zeman. The meetings concluded when Zeman met Vlastimil Válek on 10 December 2021. Zeman then stated that he did not intend to appoint Lipavský. Fiala responded that Constitutional Court would decide whether the president could reject a minister nominated by the prime minister, and said he would meet Zeman on 13 December 2021 to discuss the next steps for the appointment of the cabinet.

Fiala met Zeman on 13 December 2021 at Lány Castle. After the meeting, Zeman agreed to appoint all cabinet members, including Lipavský, on 17 December 2021. A vote of confidence in the Chamber of Deputies was scheduled for 12 January 2022.

Fiala's cabinet was appointed by Zeman on 17 December 2021. Fiala said that his cabinet had taken over responsibility, noting that "we are not starting in a good situation as there are many overlooked problems. We will start working immediately as there is so much work and we want to do it differently than our predecessors." Zdeněk Nekula was the only minister that was not appointed, as he had tested positive for COVID-19. His appointment as Minister of Agriculture was postponed until January 2022, and Marian Jurečka was temporarily designated to manage the Ministry of Agriculture. Fiala confirmed on 2 January 2022 that Nekula would be appointed on 3 January, and the new cabinet would ask the Chamber of Deputies for confidence on 12 January 2022. Nekula was appointed on 3 January 2022, completing the cabinet.

Fiala's cabinet was presented to the Chamber of Deputies on 12 January 2022 for a confidence vote. The vote did not occur on that day as the pre-vote debate continued for 22 hours. The vote was also delayed by Freedom and Direct Democracy leader Tomio Okamura, who called for a special meeting over the financing of Mayors and Independents, following media reports that the party had accepted gifts from Cyprus. The confidence debate session continued in the evening of 13 January 2022. After 23 hours of debate, the cabinet won the confidence vote by 106–87, with 193 MPs present.

=== International response ===
Slovak President Zuzana Čaputová congratulated the Czech Republic and wished it a successful and conflict-free government formation. Prime Minister Eduard Heger congratulated the country for the high voter turnout and congratulated Spolu for victory, noting that he hoped Fiala would form a government that would govern well. He described Czechs as Slovakia's "closest friends and brothers." Hungarian prime minister Viktor Orbán congratulated Fiala on his appointment as prime minister, calling the Czech Republic a friend and strategic partner.

The international press identified the result as a sign of the decline of populism in Central Europe. The New York Times noted the surprise defeat for Babiš. The Wall Street Journal suggested that the result might echo in Hungary before the 2022 Hungarian parliamentary election.

== See also ==
- 2021 in politics and government
- 2021 in the Czech Republic
- 2021 Speaker of the Chamber of Deputies of the Parliament of the Czech Republic election
- Elections in the Czech Republic
- List of elections in 2021
