= Opinion polling for the 2021 Czech parliamentary election =

Opinion polling for the 2021 Czech parliamentary election started immediately after the 2017 parliamentary election. Monthly party ratings are conducted by Sanep, TNS Kantar, STEM and CVVM.

== Graphical summary ==
View source data.
View source data.

== Percentage ==
Poll results are listed in the tables below in reverse chronological order, showing the most recent first. The highest percentage figure in each polling survey is displayed in bold, and the background shaded in the leading party's colour. In case of a tie, then no figure is shaded. Poll results use the date the survey's fieldwork was done, as opposed to the date of publication; however, if this date is unknown, the date of publication is given in its place. There is an electoral threshold of 5% for political parties.

=== 2021 ===
| Polling firm | Fieldwork date | Sample size | Turnout | ANO | SPOLU | | | Piráti+STAN | | SPD | KSČM | ČSSD | T–S–SsČR | | Z | APB | VB | PSH | Oth. | Lead | Govt. + sup. (Note: Communist Party of Bohemia and Moravia until 13 April 2021.) | Opp. |
| Polling firm | Fieldwork date | Sample size | Turnout | ANO | ODS | KDU– ČSL | TOP 09 | Piráti | STAN | SPD | KSČM | ČSSD | S | T | Z | APB | VB | PSH | Oth. | Lead | Govt. + sup. | Opp. |
| 2021 legislative election | 8–9 Oct | | | 27.1 | 27.8 | | | 15.6 | | 9.6 | 3.6 | 4.7 | 2.8 | | 1.0 | 0.2 | 1.3 | 4.7 | 1.6 | 0.7 | 31.8 | 53.0 |
|---|---|---|---|---|---|---|---|---|---|---|---|---|---|---|---|---|---|---|---|---|---|---|
| STEM/MARK | Exit Poll | | | **27.8** | 26.4 | | | 15.0 | | 10.0 | 3.9 | 5.0 | 2.8 | | 1.0 | —N/a | 1.3 | 4.7 | 2.9 | 1.4 | **32.8** | 51.4 |
| STEM | 24–30 Sep | 1247 | —N/a | **27.3** | 21.4 | | | 17.4 | | 12.3 | 6.5 | 4.4 | 1.8 | | 1.6 | —N/a | —N/a | 5.7 | 1.7 | 5.9 | **31.7** | 57.6 |
| Sanep | 23–30 Sep | 1,897 | 61.9 | **26.1** | 20.7 | | | 18.3 | | 10.2 | 5.0 | 6.1 | 2.6 | | 1.0 | 3.1 | 2.5 | 4.0 | 0.4 | 5.4 | **32.2** | 54.3 |
| Phoenix Research | Sep | 1085 | 58.0 | **24.6** | 23.4 | | | 15.1 | | 11.4 | 4.4 | 5.6 | 5.1 | | —N/a | —N/a | 2.2 | 5.1 | 3.1 | 1.2 | **30.2** | 54.3 |
| Median | 23–29 Sep | – | – | **25.2** | 20.9 | | | 19.4 | | 10.1 | 4.4 | 5.6 | 4.5 | | 2.1 | —N/a | 1.6 | 3.9 | 2.3 | 4.2 | **30.8** | 54.8 |
| Kantar CZ | 13–22 Sep | 1200 | —N/a | **24.5** | 23.0 | | | 20.5 | | 11.5 | 5.0 | 4.5 | 2.5 | | —N/a | —N/a | 2.0 | 4.0 | 2.5 | 1.5 | **30.0** | 60.0 |
| STEM | 2–13 Sep | 1008 | —N/a | **27.7** | 20.0 | | | 17.9 | | 11.9 | 6.8 | 6.7 | 2.0 | | 1.5 | —N/a | 1.4 | 3.6 | 0.5 | 7.7 | **34.3** | 56.6 |
| Ipsos | 8–12 Sep | —N/a | —N/a | **27.4** | 24.7 | | | 17.3 | | 9.6 | 4.1 | 4.1 | 3.5 | | 1.7 | —N/a | —N/a | 5.5 | 2.0 | 2.7 | **31.5** | 55.7 |
| Phoenix Research | 1–10 Sep | 1,066 | —N/a | **25.4** | 17.1 | | | 15.6 | | 11.5 | 3.3 | 6.0 | 4.6 | | —N/a | 3.0 | —N/a | 6.0 | 7.5 | 8.3 | **31.4** | 47.5 |
| Sanep | 2–9 Sep | 1,967 | —N/a | **25.7** | 20.0 | | | 17.8 | | 10.2 | 5.1 | 5.9 | 2.6 | | 1.2 | 3.1 | 2.4 | 4.9 | 1.0 | 5.7 | **31.6** | 53.1 |
| Median | Sep | – | – | **28.8** | 21.7 | | | 19.8 | | 10.7 | 3.5 | 4.9 | 4.7 | | 2.5 | —N/a | —N/a | 4.0 | 0.0 | 7.1 | **33.7** | 55.7 |
| STEM | 31 Aug–8 Sep | 1014 | —N/a | **32.4** | 20.0 | | | 18.0 | | 11.8 | 5.4 | 4.4 | 3.5 | | —N/a | —N/a | 1.3 | 2.2 | 1.1 | 12.4 | **36.8** | 55.2 |
| Data Collect | 30 Aug–8 Sep | 1200 | —N/a | **25.0** | 22.0 | | | 21.0 | | 9.0 | 5.5 | 4.0 | 3.5 | | —N/a | —N/a | —N/a | 4.5 | 5.5 | 3.0 | **29.0** | 57.5 |
| Median | 1 Aug–2 Sep | 1,058 | – | **27.0** | 21.0 | | | 20.5 | | 9.0 | 6.0 | 4.5 | 3.0 | | 2.5 | —N/a | <1.0 | 4.0 | <2.5 | 6.0 | **30.5** | 54.5 |
| Médea Research | August | – | – | **27.6** | 22.3 | | | 19.3 | | 8.7 | 5.1 | 5.1 | 2.6 | | 1.4 | 1.7 | 0.9 | 4.9 | 0.4 | 5.3 | **32.7** | 55.8 |
| Kantar CZ | 2 – 13 Aug | 1200 | 61.5 | **26.5** | 11.5 | 4.5 | 5.0 | 12.0 | 10.5 | 9.5 | 5.0 | 3.5 | 2.0 | | —N/a | —N/a | 2.0 | 5.5 | 2.5 | 14.5 | **30.0** | 70.0 |
| Kantar CZ | 2 – 13 Aug | 1200 | 61.5 | **27.5** | 21.0 | | | 21.0 | | 10.0 | 5.0 | 3.5 | 2.0 | | —N/a | —N/a | 2.0 | 6.0 | 2.0 | 6.5 | **31.0** | 69.0 |
| STEM | 9 – 12 Aug | 1013 | —N/a | **31.1** | 21.7 | | | 18.7 | | 11.2 | 5.8 | 4.6 | 3.1 | | 0.2 | —N/a | —N/a | 3.3 | 0.4 | 9.4 | **34.7** | 57.4 |
| Phoenix Research | 1–10 Aug | 1,066 | 58.9 | **24.4** | 18.0 | | | 18.0 | | 11.5 | 4.2 | 5.1 | 3.1 | | 1.1 | 2.5 | —N/a | 6.0 | 2.6 | 6.4 | **29.5** | 51.7 |
| Median | 1–31 Jul | 1078 | – | **26.0** | 21.5 | | | 20.0 | | 7.0 | 6.0 | 4.5 | 3.0 | | 2.5 | —N/a | —N/a | 6.5 | 3.0 | 4.5 | **30.5** | 54.5 |
| Sanep | 8–14 Jul | 1,876 | —N/a | **23.6** | 20.3 | | | 23.4 | | 9.6 | 5.2 | 5.1 | 3.5 | | 1.4 | 2.0 | —N/a | 4.9 | 1.0 | 0.2 | **28.7** | 58.5 |
| CVVM | 26 Jun–11 Jul | 621 | 63.0 | **23.5** | 21.5 | | | 21.0 | | 9.0 | 8.0 | 6.5 | 2.5 | | 2.0 | —N/a | —N/a | 3.0 | 3.0 | 2.0 | **30.0** | 57.0 |
| Phoenix Research | 1–10 Jul | 1,028 | 56.9 | **22.1** | 16.8 | | | 21.1 | | 12.1 | 3.8 | 5.0 | 3.1 | | 1.0 | 2.1 | —N/a | 5.3 | 3.5 | 1.3 | **27.4** | 53.8 |
| Median | 1–30 Jun | 1033 | – | **26.0** | 20.0 | | | 21.5 | | 8.0 | 5.5 | 5.0 | 3.5 | | 2.0 | —N/a | —N/a | 6.0 | 2.5 | 4.5 | **31.0** | 61.0 |
| STEM | 21 – 29 Jun | 1010 | 60.0 | **27.0** | 10.9 | 3.2 | 3.0 | 15.5 | 8.7 | 11.1 | 5.6 | 5.4 | 0.8 | 1.6 | 1.6 | —N/a | —N/a | 5.0 | 0.6 | 11.5 | **32.4** | 67.0 |
| STEM | 21 – 29 Jun | 1010 | 60.0 | **26.7** | 17.4 | | | 24.1 | | 10.9 | 5.5 | 5.5 | 2.6 | | 1.6 | —N/a | —N/a | 5.1 | 0.6 | 2.6 | **32.2** | 67.2 |
| Kantar CZ | 7 - 18 Jun | 1200 | 77.0 | **20.0** | 11.5 | 3.0 | 7.5 | 14.0 | 13.0 | 12.0 | 4.0 | 3.5 | —N/a | —N/a | —N/a | —N/a | —N/a | 6.0 | 5.5 | 6.0 | **23.5** | 71.0 |
| Kantar CZ | 7 - 18 Jun | 1200 | 77.0 | 21.5 | 23.5 | | | **24.0** | | 12.5 | 4.5 | 3.5 | —N/a | —N/a | —N/a | —N/a | —N/a | 6.0 | 4.5 | 0.5 | **25.0** | 70.5 |
| Sanep | 10 - 15 Jun | 1926 | | 22.3 | 20.1 | | | **24.7** | | 10.7 | 5.1 | 5.3 | 3.4 | | 1.3 | 1.5 | —N/a | 4.5 | 1.1 | 2.4 | **27.6** | 60.6 |
| CVVM | 29 May–13 Jun | 643 | – | **24.5** | 19.5 | | | 22.5 | | 9.5 | 7.5 | 7.5 | 3.5 | | 1.5 | —N/a | —N/a | 2.5 | 1.5 | 2.0 | **32.0** | 57.5 |
| Data Collect | 31 May–11 Jun | 910 | 75.0 | **20.0** | 12.5 | 3.0 | 4.5 | 16.5 | 11.0 | 10.5 | 5.0 | 4.5 | 3.5 | | —N/a | —N/a | —N/a | 4.0 | 5.0 | 3.5 | **24.5** | 63.0 |
| Data Collect | 31 May–11 Jun | 882 | 75.0 | 20.5 | 19.5 | | | **25.5** | | 10.5 | 5.5 | 5.0 | 3.0 | | —N/a | —N/a | —N/a | 5.0 | 5.5 | 4.0 | **24.5** | 61.0 |
| Phoenix Research | 1–10 Jun | 1,099 | 57.7 | 20.2 | 15.9 | | | **24.2** | | 12.1 | 4.5 | 5.1 | 3.0 | | 1.2 | 1.7 | —N/a | 4.2 | 3.0 | 4.0 | **25.3** | 56.7 |
| Ipsos | 2-6 Jun | 1,040 | 64.0 | **23.5** | 23.1 | | | 22.4 | | 9.6 | 4.7 | 4.7 | 3.4 | | 1.9 | —N/a | —N/a | 5.6 | 1.0 | 0.4 | **28.2** | 59.8 |
| Median | 1–31 May | 1072 | – | 23.0 | 19.5 | | | **24.0** | | 9.0 | 6.0 | 7.0 | 3.5 | | 2.5 | —N/a | —N/a | 4.0 | 1.5 | 1.0 | **30.0** | 58.0 |
| Kantar CZ | 10 - 28 May | 1200 | 75.0 | **19.0** | 11.5 | 4.0 | 6.5 | 16.5 | 11.5 | 10.0 | 5.0 | 3.0 | —N/a | 2.5 | 2.0 | —N/a | —N/a | 4.5 | 4.0 | 2.5 | **27.0** | 60.0 |
| Kantar CZ | 10 - 28 May | 1200 | 75.0 | 20.0 | 21.5 | | | **26.0** | | 10.0 | 5.5 | 3.0 | 4.0 | | 2.0 | —N/a | —N/a | 5.0 | 3.0 | 4.5 | **28.5** | 57.5 |
| Ipsos | 19 - 24 May | TBA | 64.0 | 22.1 | 23.1 | | | **23.7** | | 10.2 | 5.8 | 4.1 | 3.4 | | —N/a | —N/a | —N/a | 4.3 | 3.4 | 0.6 | **32.0** | 57.0 |
| Data Collect | 3-7 & 17–21 May | 875 | 74.0 | **18.2** | 11.9 | 3.3 | 5.7 | 17.3 | 12.6 | 12.2 | 6.0 | 2.9 | —N/a | —N/a | —N/a | —N/a | —N/a | 3.7 | 6.3 | 0.9 | **27.1** | 63.0 |
| Data Collect | 3-7 & 17–21 May | 875 | 74.0 | 19.4 | 20.7 | | | **27.0** | | 13.0 | 6.2 | 3.6 | 2.3 | | —N/a | —N/a | —N/a | 3.8 | 4.0 | 7.3 | **29.2** | 60.0 |
| Sanep | 13 - 19 May | 1834 | | 22.4 | 18.5 | | | **26.3** | | 10.8 | 4.9 | 5.7 | 3.8 | | 1.2 | 1.5 | —N/a | 3.5 | 1.4 | 4.0 | **28.1** | 55.6 |
| Phoenix Research | 1–10 May | 1017 | 59.5 | 21.2 | 15.4 | | | **24.3** | | 12.0 | 4.3 | 5.0 | 3.2 | | 1.2 | 1.5 | —N/a | 3.0 | 3.2 | 3.1 | **26.2** | 56.0 |
| Median | 1 Apr - 4 May | 1007 | 67.0 | 21.0 | 17.0 | | | **27.5** | | 11.5 | 6.0 | 6.5 | 2.5 | | 3.0 | —N/a | —N/a | 2.5 | 2.5 | 6.5 | **33.5** | 56.0 |
| Kantar CZ | 12–30 Apr | 1200 | —N/a | **20.0** | 11.5 | 3.5 | 6.5 | 19.0 | 11.0 | 11.0 | 5.0 | 3.5 | —N/a | —N/a | 2.0 | —N/a | —N/a | 2.0 | 5.0 | 1.0 | **23.5** | 67.5 |
| Kantar CZ | 12–30 Apr | 1200 | —N/a | 21.0 | 21.5 | | | **27.0** | | 12.0 | 5.0 | 4.0 | 3.5 | | —N/a | —N/a | —N/a | 2.5 | 3.5 | 5.5 | **25.0** | 65.5 |
| Sanep | 15–21 Apr | 1981 | 61.2 | 23.9 | 17.7 | | | **26.4** | | 10.5 | 5.7 | 5.1 | 5.0 | | 1.4 | —N/a | —N/a | 3.0 | 1.3 | 2.5 | **29.0** | 63.3 |
| | **13 Apr** | **Communist Party of Bohemia and Moravia terminated its support of the government** | | | | | | | | | | | | | | | | | | | | |
| STEM | 7–13 Apr | 1049 | —N/a | **23.8** | 8.7 | 3.5 | 4.1 | 18.6 | 11.0 | 12.9 | 5.1 | 6.6 | 0.6 | 1.1 | 1.1 | —N/a | —N/a | 2.4 | 0.5 | 5.2 | **35.5** | 58.8 |
| STEM | 7–13 Apr | 1049 | —N/a | 24.0 | 16.6 | | | **27.9** | | 12.8 | 5.2 | 7.0 | 1.9 | | 1.4 | —N/a | —N/a | 2.4 | 0.7 | 3.9 | **36.2** | 57.3 |
| Ipsos | 8–12 Apr | 1,009 | —N/a | 22.2 | 21.7 | | | **27.9** | | 10.0 | 5.4 | 4.5 | 3.6 | | —N/a | —N/a | —N/a | 2.4 | 2.2 | 5.3 | **32.0** | 59.2 |
| Phoenix Research | 1–10 Apr | 1022 | 58.5 | 22.1 | 15.7 | | | **24.1** | | 11.2 | 5.1 | 5.7 | —N/a | 3.5 | —N/a | —N/a | —N/a | —N/a | 4.6 | 2.0 | **32.9** | 54.5 |
| Data Collect | 25 Mar – 1 Apr | 881 | —N/a | **20.8** | 10.0 | 4.7 | 5.5 | 17.2 | 14.3 | 12.6 | 2.7 | 3.0 | —N/a | 3.3 | —N/a | —N/a | —N/a | —N/a | 6.1 | 3.6 | **26.5** | 55.0 |
| Data Collect | 25 Mar – 1 Apr | 919 | —N/a | 22.1 | 18.2 | | | **28.5** | | 13.4 | 2.8 | 3.7 | 5.1 | | —N/a | —N/a | —N/a | —N/a | 6.2 | 6.4 | **28.6** | 51.8 |
| Kantar CZ | 25 Mar – 1 Apr | 1200 | 79.0 | **22.0** | 9.0 | 4.0 | 6.5 | 20.0 | 12.0 | 11.5 | 5.0 | 3.0 | —N/a | —N/a | —N/a | —N/a | —N/a | 2.0 | 6.5 | 2.0 | **30.0** | 63.0 |
| Kantar CZ | 25 Mar – 1 Apr | 1200 | 79.0 | 23.5 | 19.0 | | | **30.0** | | 12.0 | 5.0 | 3.0 | 2.0 | | —N/a | —N/a | —N/a | 2.0 | 5.0 | 6.5 | **31.5** | 61.0 |
| Median | 1 - 29 Mar | 1,013 | 67.0 | 24.5 | 17.5 | | | **27.5** | | 10.0 | 7.5 | 4.0 | —N/a | 3.0 | 2.0 | —N/a | —N/a | —N/a | 4.0 | 3.0 | **36.0** | 55.0 |
| | **23 Mar** | **Civic Democratic Alliance, Agrarian Democratic Party, Order of Nation and Democratic Green Party form an electoral alliance** | | | | | | | | | | | | | | | | | | | | |
| Sanep | 18 Mar–23 Mar | 1869 | 60.7 | **26.2** | 17.9 | | | 26.1 | | 10.3 | 6.3 | 5.3 | —N/a | 2.8 | 1.3 | —N/a | —N/a | —N/a | 3.8 | 0.1 | **37.8** | 58.4 |
| Ipsos | 12 - 16 Mar | 1,036 | 65.0 | 25.3 | 20.9 | | | **26.9** | | 9.5 | 4.0 | 4.0 | 1.9 | 3.1 | 1.5 | —N/a | —N/a | —N/a | 2.8 | 1.6 | **33.3** | 57.3 |
| Phoenix Research | 1 Mar–10 Mar | 1058 | 57.2 | **23.2** | 16.1 | | | 23.0 | | 10.3 | 5.3 | 5.8 | —N/a | 3.4 | —N/a | —N/a | —N/a | —N/a | 3.3 | 0.2 | **34.3** | 52.8 |
| | **5 Mar** | **Trikolóra, Svobodní and SsČR form an electoral alliance** | | | | | | | | | | | | | | | | | | | | |
| Kantar CZ | 15 Feb–5 Mar | 1200 | 74.0 | 20.5 | 9.5 | 4.5 | 5.5 | **22.0** | 13.0 | 10.5 | 5.0 | 4.5 | —N/a | —N/a | —N/a | —N/a | —N/a | —N/a | 5.0 | 1.5 | **30.0** | 65.0 |
| Kantar CZ | 15 Feb–5 Mar | 1200 | 74.0 | 22.0 | 17.5 | | | **34.0** | | 11.0 | 5.5 | 4.5 | —N/a | —N/a | —N/a | —N/a | —N/a | —N/a | 5.5 | 12.0 | **32.0** | 62.5 |
| Median | 1 Feb–2 Mar | 1,048 | 64.5 | **26.5** | 18.5 | | | 25.0 | | 10.0 | 8.0 | 4.5 | —N/a | 2.5 | 1.5 | —N/a | —N/a | —N/a | 3.5 | 1.5 | **39.0** | 53.5 |
| Sanep | 18–23 Feb | 15,635 | 61.2 | **26.8** | 18.6 | | | 24.9 | | 9.4 | 5.3 | 5.9 | —N/a | 2.6 | 1.2 | —N/a | —N/a | —N/a | 5.3 | 1.9 | **38.0** | 52.9 |
| Ipsos | 15–19 Feb | 1,000 | 65.0 | **25.4** | 20.5 | | | 24.9 | | 9.4 | 4.8 | 5.5 | 1.8 | 3.4 | 1.6 | —N/a | —N/a | —N/a | 2.7 | 0.5 | **35.7** | 54.8 |
| Phoenix Research | 1–11 Feb | 1,062 | 59.8 | **24.4** | 19.5 | | | 20.3 | | 10.1 | 3.4 | 5.8 | —N/a | 3.6 | —N/a | —N/a | —N/a | —N/a | 4.4 | 4.1 | **30.2** | 49.9 |
| Kantar CZ | 18 Jan–5 Feb | 1200 | 73.0 | **26.0** | 10.5 | 4.5 | 4.5 | 21.0 | 9.5 | 10.5 | 5.0 | 3.5 | —N/a | —N/a | —N/a | —N/a | —N/a | —N/a | 5.0 | 5.0 | **34.5** | 60.5 |
| Kantar CZ | 18 Jan–5 Feb | 1200 | 73.0 | 26.5 | 19.5 | | | **29.5** | | 10.5 | 5.0 | 4.0 | —N/a | —N/a | —N/a | —N/a | —N/a | —N/a | 5.0 | 3.0 | **35.5** | 59.5 |
| Kantar CZ | Oct–Jan | 2744 | —N/a | **25.5** | 11.5 | 4.5 | 5.5 | 20.0 | 10.5 | 10.0 | 4.5 | 3.5 | —N/a | 1.5 | —N/a | —N/a | —N/a | —N/a | 3.0 | 5.5 | **33.5** | 62.0 |
| Median | 1–29 Jan | 1062 | 63.5 | **26.5** | 18.5 | | | 25.0 | | 9.0 | 7.0 | 7.0 | —N/a | 2.0 | 1.5 | —N/a | —N/a | —N/a | 3.5 | 1.5 | **40.5** | 52.5 |
| Sanep | 21–26 Jan | 1,843 | 61.1 | **27.1** | 18.3 | | | 23.6 | | 8.8 | 5.0 | 6.2 | —N/a | 2.5 | 0.8 | —N/a | —N/a | —N/a | 7.7 | 3.5 | **38.3** | 50.7 |
| Ipsos | 15–19 Jan | 1018 | 64.0 | **27.2** | 21.7 | | | 23.2 | | 8.4 | 6.0 | 5.8 | 1.9 | 3.6 | 1.2 | —N/a | —N/a | —N/a | 0.8 | 4.0 | **39.0** | 53.3 |
| Phoenix Research | 1–10 Jan | 1,038 | 68.1 | **25.5** | 20.3 | | | 19.3 | | 9.0 | 4.1 | 5.6 | —N/a | 3.9 | —N/a | —N/a | —N/a | —N/a | 12.3 | 5.2 | **35.2** | 48.6 |
| 2017 election | 20–21 Oct 2017 | – | 60.8 | **29.6** | 11.3 | 5.8 | 5.3 | 10.8 | 5.2 | 10.6 | 7.8 | 7.3 | 1.6 | —N/a | 1.5 | 0.2 | 0.1 | —N/a | 3.2 | 18.3 | 44.7 | 49.0 |

=== 2020 ===
| Polling firm | Fieldwork date | Sample size | Turnout | ANO | SPOLU | | | PaS | | SPD | KSČM | ČSSD | S | Z | T | Oth. | Lead | Govt. + sup. | Opp. |
| Polling firm | Fieldwork date | Sample size | Turnout | ANO | ODS | KDU– ČSL | TOP 09 | Piráti | STAN | SPD | KSČM | ČSSD | S | Z | T | Oth. | Lead | Govt. + sup. | Opp. |
|---|---|---|---|---|---|---|---|---|---|---|---|---|---|---|---|---|---|---|---|
| Sanep | 11–16 Dec | 13,251 | 61.2 | 27.7 | 20.1 | | | 17.5 | 8.0 | 8.1 | 5.0 | 6.7 | —N/a | 1.0 | 2.8 | 3.1 | 7.6 | **39.4** | **53.7** |
| Kantar CZ | 13 Nov–4 Dec | 1200 | 73.0 | 25.0 | 11.5 | 4.5 | 5.0 | 20.0 | 10.5 | 10.5 | 3.5 | 4.5 | —N/a | —N/a | 1.0 | 4.0 | 5.0 | **33.0** | **51.5** |
| Kantar CZ | 13 Nov–4 Dec | 1200 | 73.0 | 25.0 | 19.5 | | | 20.0 | 10.5 | 10.5 | 3.5 | 4.5 | —N/a | —N/a | 1.0 | 5.5 | 5.0 | **33.0** | **50.0** |
| Median | 1 Nov–30 Nov | 1003 | 62.5 | 28.5 | 10.5 | 4.5 | 5.0 | 14.0 | 10.5 | 8.5 | 6.0 | 7.0 | —N/a | 1.5 | 2.5 | 1.5 | 14.5 | **41.5** | **53.0** |
| | **23 Nov** | **Piráti and STAN form an electoral alliance** | | | | | | | | | | | | | | | | | |
| Sanep | 12 Nov–17 Nov | 14,634 | 60.1 | 27.9 | 20.5 | | | 16.0 | 7.9 | 7.4 | 5.5 | 7.3 | —N/a | 0.9 | 3.6 | 3.0 | 7.4 | **40.7** | **51.8** |
| | **27 Oct** | **ODS, KDU-ČSL and TOP 09 form an electoral alliance SPOLU** | | | | | | | | | | | | | | | | | |
| Sanep | 19–25 Oct | 19,963 | 60.2 | 26.7 | 22.9 | | | 24.5 | | 7.6 | 5.0 | 8.5 | —N/a | —N/a | —N/a | 4.8 | 2.2 | **40.2** | **55.0** |
| Kantar CZ | 19 Oct–6 Nov | 1200 | 71.0 | 27.5 | 10.5 | 4.0 | 5.5 | 21.0 | 11.0 | 9.0 | 4.5 | 3.0 | —N/a | —N/a | 2.0 | 2.0 | 6.5 | **35.0** | **61.0** |
| Median | 1 Oct–29 Oct | 1072 | 65.5 | 28.5 | 13.0 | 5.0 | 6.5 | 13.5 | 7.5 | 7.5 | 7.0 | 6.5 | —N/a | 1.5 | 2.0 | 2.0 | 15.0 | **42.0** | **54.0** |
| Kantar CZ | 21 Sep–9 Oct | 1200 | 76.0 | 24.5 | 13.5 | 6.0 | 5.5 | 19.0 | 9.5 | 8.0 | 4.5 | 4.0 | —N/a | —N/a | 3.0 | 2.0 | 5.5 | **33.0** | **61.5** |
| Sanep | 10–15 Sep | 12,521 | 59.9 | 28.2 | 12.4 | 4.8 | 4.5 | 14.6 | 5.4 | 6.3 | 5.6 | 10.1 | —N/a | 1.0 | 4.2 | 2.9 | 13.6 | **43.9** | 41.7 |
| CVVM | 5–20 Sep | 656 | —N/a | 31.5 | 12.5 | 3.5 | 4.0 | 16.0 | 4.5 | 4.5 | 9.5 | 10.5 | —N/a | 1.0 | 2.0 | 0.5 | 15.5 | **51.5** | **48.5** |
| STEM | 31 Aug – 13 Sep | 1027 | 56.0 | 28.4 | 10.6 | 5.4 | 5.3 | 12.8 | 7.5 | 8.8 | 7.3 | 7.3 | 1.0 | 1.1 | 3.4 | 0.9 | 15.6 | **43.0** | **50.4** |
| Kantar CZ | 24 Aug–11 Sep | 1200 | 75.0 | 27.5 | 15.0 | 4.0 | 5.0 | 19.5 | 6.5 | 8.0 | 4.5 | 5.5 | —N/a | —N/a | 2.5 | 2.0 | 8.0 | **37.5** | **58** |
| Median | 1 Aug–27 Aug | 1037 | 63.0 | 29.5 | 11.0 | 5.5 | 6.5 | 12.5 | 5.0 | 7.5 | 7.0 | 9.5 | —N/a | 2.0 | 2.5 | 1.5 | 17.0 | **46.0** | **48.0** |
| Sanep | 23–29 Jul | 11,936 | 56.9 | 29.3 | 13.5 | 4.4 | 4.9 | 14.8 | 5.3 | 5.5 | 6.0 | 8.2 | —N/a | 1.0 | 4.3 | 2.8 | 14.5 | **43.5** | 42.9 |
| CVVM | 18 Jul–27 Jul | 972 | 61.0 | 29.0 | 12.0 | 6.5 | 3.5 | 14.5 | 5.5 | 6.0 | 7.5 | 9.5 | 1.0 | 1.5 | 2.5 | 1.0 | 14.5 | **46.0** | **44.5** |
| Kantar CZ | 15 Jun–3 Jul | 2,603 | 74.0 | 32.0 | 13.0 | 4.5 | 5.5 | 18.0 | 6.0 | 5.5 | 5.5 | 5.0 | —N/a | —N/a | 3.0 | 2.0 | 14.0 | **43.5** | **52.5** |
| CVVM | 20 Jun–2 Jul | 697 | 61.0 | 29.0 | 14.0 | 4.5 | 4.5 | 13.5 | 5.0 | 4.0 | 7.5 | 13.0 | —N/a | 1.5 | 2.0 | 1.5 | 15.0 | **49.5** | **45.5** |
| Sanep | 4–10 Jun | 14,358 | 57.1 | 28.1 | 13.4 | 4.3 | 4.7 | 12.9 | 4.9 | 7.0 | 5.6 | 7.3 | —N/a | 0.9 | 5.0 | 5.9 | 14.7 | **41.0** | 35.3 |
| Kantar CZ | 18 May–5 Jun | 1,200 | 73.0 | 31.5 | 13.5 | 4.0 | 5.0 | 17.0 | 5.5 | 8.0 | 5.0 | 5.5 | —N/a | —N/a | 2.0 | 3.0 | 14.5 | **42.0** | **53.0** |
| STEM | 22 May–1 Jun | 1,086 | 56.0 | 33.7 | 11.4 | 6.1 | 3.3 | 12.8 | 4.2 | 6.5 | 7.3 | 8.9 | 0.7 | 1.4 | 3.5 | 0.2 | 11.9 | **49.9** | **36.8** |
| Sanep | 7–13 May | 15,936 | 58.1 | 29.6 | 13.4 | 4.5 | 5.0 | 11.2 | 4.9 | 6.7 | 5.9 | 7.0 | —N/a | 0.8 | 5.2 | 5.8 | 16.2 | **42.5** | **41.5** |
| g82 | 15–30 Apr | —N/a | —N/a | 35.0 | 10.0 | 4.0 | 6.0 | 17.0 | 4.0 | 7.0 | 4.0 | 6.0 | 1.0 | —N/a | 3.0 | 1.0 | 18.0 | **45.0** | **40.0** |
| CVVM | 29 Feb–11 Mar | 1,012 | 62.0 | 33.0 | 14.5 | 7.0 | 4.5 | 12.5 | 4.5 | 4.5 | 7.0 | 8.5 | —N/a | 1.0 | 2.0 | 1.0 | 18.5 | **48.5** | **34.0** |
| Kantar CZ | 10–28 Feb | 1,200 | 73.0 | 31.0 | 13.0 | 5.0 | 5.5 | 15.5 | 6.5 | 6.5 | 4.5 | 5.5 | —N/a | —N/a | 3.0 | 4.0 | 15.5 | **36.5** | **52.0** |
| Median | 1 Jan–13 Feb | 1,111 | 62.5 | 30.0 | 14.0 | 5.0 | 4.5 | 11.5 | 6.0 | 7.5 | 8.0 | 7.0 | —N/a | 2.0 | 2.0 | 2.5 | 16.0 | **45.0** | **44.0** |
| CVVM | 1–13 Feb | 1,020 | 62.0 | 33.0 | 14.0 | 6.0 | 3.5 | 13.0 | 3.5 | 5.0 | 8.0 | 9.0 | —N/a | 2.0 | 2.0 | 1.0 | 19.0 | **50.0** | **38.0** |
| Kantar CZ | 13–31 Jan | 1,200 | 59.0 | 30.0 | 12.5 | 5.0 | 5.5 | 16.5 | 5.0 | 7.5 | 6.5 | 5.0 | —N/a | 2.0 | 2.5 | 2.0 | 13.5 | **41.5** | **52.0** |
| | **25 Jan** | **Marian Jurečka becomes leader of KDU-ČSL** | | | | | | | | | | | | | | | | | |
| CVVM | 11–22 Jan | 1,028 | 65.0 | 32.0 | 15.0 | 5.5 | 5.0 | 13.5 | 5.5 | 4.0 | 7.5 | 8.5 | —N/a | 1.0 | 2.0 | 0.5 | 17.0 | **48.0** | **44.5** |
| Sanep | 9–15 Jan | 16,834 | 57.8 | 28.9 | 10.8 | 5.8 | 5.2 | 8.5 | 4.1 | 8.1 | 6.7 | 4.7 | —N/a | 1.0 | 7.4 | 8.8 | 18.1 | **40.3** | 34.4 |
| Phoenix Research | 1–12 Jan | 1,002 | 52.5 | 25.3 | 9.0 | 5.8 | 2.5 | 14.0 | 5.1 | 7.5 | 4.0 | 6.2 | —N/a | —N/a | 6.1 | 14.5 | 11.3 | 35.5 | **50.0** |
| 2017 election | 20–21 Oct 2017 | – | 60.8 | 29.6 | 11.3 | 5.8 | 5.3 | 10.8 | 5.2 | 10.6 | 7.8 | 7.3 | 1.6 | 1.5 | —N/a | 3.2 | 18.3 | 44.7 | **49.0** |

=== 2019 ===
| Polling firm | Fieldwork date | Sample size | Turnout | ANO | ODS | Piráti | SPD | KSČM | ČSSD | KDU– ČSL | TOP 09 | STAN | S | Z | T | Oth. | Lead | Govt. + sup. | Opp. |
|---|---|---|---|---|---|---|---|---|---|---|---|---|---|---|---|---|---|---|---|
| STEM | 29 Nov–10 Dec | 1,083 | 54.0 | 33.6 | 12.3 | 12.3 | 5.6 | 8.2 | 6.4 | 6.4 | 5.8 | 5.5 | 1.8 | 1.0 | 0.5 | 0.6 | 21.3 | **48.2** | 47.9 |
| CVVM | 30 Nov–11 Dec | 713 | 62.0 | 29.5 | 12.5 | 14.0 | 5.5 | 8.0 | 10.0 | 6.5 | 3.5 | 4.0 | 1.0 | 1.5 | 3.5 | 1.5 | 15.5 | 47.5 | **48.5** |
| Median | 29 Oct–30 Nov | 1,126 | 63.0 | 30.5 | 12.5 | 12.5 | 7.5 | 7.5 | 7.5 | 5.0 | 5.5 | 6.0 | —N/a | 1.5 | 2.0 | 2.0 | 18.0 | 45.5 | **49.0** |
| Kantar CZ | 9 Nov–29 Nov | 1,200 | 56.0 | 28.5 | 14.5 | 13.5 | 6.5 | 5.0 | 6.0 | 4.5 | 5.5 | 6.5 | —N/a | —N/a | 6.5 | 3.0 | 14.0 | 39.5 | **53.0** |
| Sanep | 21 Nov–27 Nov | 1,926 | 54.2 | 29.2 | 10.8 | 8.9 | 7.8 | 6.4 | 5.2 | 5.5 | 4.5 | 4.0 | —N/a | 1.0 | 7.0 | 9.6 | 18.4 | 40.8 | **59.1** |
| STEM | 14 Nov–26 Nov | 1,111 | 60.0 | 34.9 | 10.5 | 10.9 | 9.1 | 7.1 | 6.4 | 5.5 | 3.7 | 7.2 | —N/a | 1.0 | 1.9 | 1.6 | 24.0 | 48.4 | **49.8** |
| | **24 Nov** | **Markéta Adamová becomes leader of TOP 09** | | | | | | | | | | | | | | | | | |
| CVVM | 2 Nov–15 Nov | 685 | 61.0 | 30.0 | 14.0 | 13.5 | 5.5 | 9.0 | 9.0 | 5.5 | 3.5 | 4.0 | 1.0 | 1.0 | 3.5 | 0.5 | 16.0 | 48.0 | **51.5** |
| Phoenix Research | 1 Nov–18 Nov | 1,089 | 58.7 | 26.6 | 8.8 | 10.5 | 7.1 | 4.7 | 5.7 | 5.6 | 3.4 | 4.5 | —N/a | —N/a | 5.1 | 18.0 | 16.1 | 37.0 | **45.0** |
| Kantar CZ | 12 Oct–1 Nov | 1,200 | 73.0 | 31.5 | 12.5 | 17.0 | 4.5 | 7.0 | 4.5 | 5.0 | 6.0 | 5.0 | —N/a | —N/a | 3.5 | 3.5 | 14.5 | 43.0 | **53.5** |
| STEM | 11 Oct–25 Oct | 991 | 60.0 | 33.1 | 10.5 | 12.2 | 7.5 | 8.4 | 6.5 | 5.6 | 4.4 | 4.3 | —N/a | 1.4 | 4.2 | 1.9 | 21.9 | **48.0** | 47.5 |
| CVVM | 4 Oct–20 Oct | 991 | 60.0 | 33.5 | 13.5 | 14.0 | 4.5 | 8.5 | 10.0 | 5.0 | 4.0 | 2.5 | —N/a | 1.0 | 3.0 | 0.5 | 19.5 | **52.0** | 47.5 |
| Median | 30 Sep–28 Oct | 1,153 | 64.5 | 30.5 | 11.5 | 12.5 | 8.0 | 7.0 | 7.5 | 4.5 | 6.0 | 6.0 | —N/a | 2.0 | 1.5 | 3.0 | 18.0 | 45.0 | **52.0** |
| Kantar CZ | 16 Sep–5 Oct | 1,200 | 72.0 | 30.0 | 14.5 | 15.5 | 6.0 | 6.5 | 5.0 | 5.0 | 5.0 | 5.5 | —N/a | —N/a | 3.5 | 3.5 | 14.5 | 41.5 | **55.0** |
| CVVM | 7 Sep–17 Sep | 1,018 | 59.0 | 30.0 | 12.0 | 13.0 | 8.5 | 8.5 | 9.5 | 4.5 | 4.0 | 4.5 | —N/a | 1.0 | 2.0 | 2.5 | 17.0 | 48.0 | **52.0** |
| Median | 28 Aug – 29 Sep | 1,012 | 64.0 | 31.0 | 12.5 | 13.5 | 7.5 | 6.5 | 7.0 | 5.5 | 5.5 | 5.5 | —N/a | 2.0 | 1.5 | 2.0 | 17.5 | 44.5 | **53.5** |
| Phoenix Research | 20 Aug–18 Sep | 1,055 | 58.5 | 30.5 | 11.0 | 19.0 | 6.0 | 5.0 | 7.5 | 5.5 | 5.0 | 3.5 | —N/a | —N/a | 4.0 | 3.0 | 11.5 | 43.0 | **54.0** |
| Kantar CZ | 10–30 Aug | 1,200 | 70.5 | 30.0 | 14.5 | 17.0 | 8.0 | 4.5 | 6.0 | 5.0 | 4.5 | 5.0 | —N/a | 2.0 | 3.5 | —N/a | 13.0 | 40.5 | **59.5** |
| Median | 27 Jul–26 Aug | 1,081 | 63.5 | 29.5 | 13.0 | 14.5 | 8.5 | 6.0 | 6.5 | 5.0 | 5.5 | 5.0 | —N/a | 2.0 | 2.0 | 2.5 | 15.0 | 42.0 | **51.5** |
| Median | 1–26 Jul | 1,041 | 62.0 | 28.5 | 12.5 | 14.0 | 9.0 | 6.5 | 8.0 | 6.0 | 4.5 | 6.0 | —N/a | 2.0 | —N/a | 3.0 | 14.5 | 43.0 | **52.0** |
| STEM | 14–30 Jun | 1,004 | 56.0 | 32.5 | 13.1 | 15.6 | 7.9 | 7.8 | 6.4 | 5.5 | 3.7 | 3.8 | 0.5 | 1.9 | —N/a | 1.3 | 16.9 | 46.7 | **49.6** |
| Median | 1–30 Jun | 1,045 | 62.0 | 29.0 | 14.5 | 13.0 | 9.0 | 7.5 | 7.5 | 5.5 | 4.5 | 5.0 | 1.0 | 2.5 | —N/a | 1.0 | 14.5 | 44.0 | **51.5** |
| Kantar TNS | 17–26 Jun | 1,200 | 73.0 | 25.5 | 13.0 | 18.5 | 8.5 | 5.5 | 6.5 | 4.5 | 5.0 | 6.0 | —N/a | —N/a | 3.0 | 4.0 | 7.0 | 37.5 | **55.5** |
| | **25 Jun** | **Tricolour Citizens' Movement (THO) founded after Václav Klaus Jr. was expelled from ODS.** | | | | | | | | | | | | | | | | | |
| CVVM | 8–17 Jun | 1,003 | 60.0 | 29.0 | 15.0 | 17.0 | 6.5 | 9.0 | 7.5 | 5.0 | 3.0 | 4.5 | —N/a | 1.0 | 1.0 | 1.5 | 12.0 | 45.5 | **51.0** |
| Kantar CZ | 11–31 May | 1,200 | 73.0 | 27.5 | 12.5 | 17.5 | 10.5 | 6.5 | 6.0 | 4.5 | 4.0 | 7.0 | —N/a | 2.0 | —N/a | 2.0 | 10.0 | 40.0 | **56.0** |
| | **24–25 May** | **2019 European Parliament election in the Czech Republic** | | | | | | | | | | | | | | | | | |
| Median | 24 Apr–25 May | 1,003 | 63.0 | 30.5 | 14.5 | 12.0 | 10.0 | 6.0 | 8.5 | 5.5 | 4.5 | 5.0 | 1.0 | 1.0 | —N/a | 1.5 | 16.0 | 45.0 | **51.5** |
| CVVM | 4–14 May | 1,001 | 63.0 | 28.0 | 17.0 | 13.5 | 5.0 | 11.0 | 9.5 | 4.5 | 3.0 | 4.5 | —N/a | 2.0 | —N/a | 2.0 | 11.0 | 47.5 | 47.5 |
| Kantar CZ | 12 Apr–3 May | 878 | 72 | 30 | 13.5 | 16.0 | 8.5 | 6.0 | 6.5 | 5.5 | 4.0 | 6.0 | —N/a | —N/a | —N/a | 4.0 | 14.0 | 42.5 | **53.5** |
| Median | 23 Mar–24 Apr | 1,011 | 61.0 | 29.5 | 14.5 | 14.0 | 7.5 | 6.5 | 9.0 | 4.5 | 4.0 | 5.5 | 1.5 | 1.5 | —N/a | 2.0 | 15.0 | 45.0 | **50.0** |
| STEM | 5–17 Apr | 1,074 | —N/a | 34.0 | 13.2 | 11.1 | 9.8 | 9.5 | 7.8 | 4.9 | 3.7 | 3.3 | 1.0 | 1.0 | —N/a | 0.7 | 20.8 | **51.3** | 46.0 |
| CVVM | 30 Mar–10 Apr | 1,032 | 59.0 | 32.0 | 14.0 | 12.5 | 6.0 | 11.0 | 12.5 | 4.0 | 3.0 | 3.5 | 1.0 | —N/a | —N/a | 0.5 | 18.0 | **55.5** | 44.0 |
| | **13 Apr** | **Vít Rakušan becomes leader of STAN** | | | | | | | | | | | | | | | | | |
| Sanep | 11–17 Apr | 1,658 | 60.8 | 32.1 | 12.0 | 17.1 | 9.8 | 7.1 | 6.3 | 5.0 | 3.5 | 3.7 | —N/a | —N/a | —N/a | 3.4 | 17.9 | 45.5 | **51.1** |
| | **29 Mar** | **Marek Výborný becomes leader of KDU-ČSL** | | | | | | | | | | | | | | | | | |
| Kantar CZ | 16 Mar–5 Apr | 870 | 73.0 | 33.0 | 13.5 | 19.0 | 5.5 | 6.0 | 6.5 | 5.0 | 4.0 | 3.5 | —N/a | 2.0 | —N/a | 2.0 | 14.0 | 45.5 | 50.5 |
| Median | 24 Feb–24 Mar | 1,038 | 64.0 | 30.5 | 14.0 | 14.0 | 8.5 | 8.0 | 8.0 | 5.0 | 4.0 | 5.0 | 1.0 | 1.5 | —N/a | 1.0 | 16.5 | 46.5 | 46.5 |
| Sanep | 14–20 Mar | 1,861 | 58.3 | 31.5 | 12.1 | 17.3 | 9.7 | 6.4 | 6.3 | 5.1 | 3.5 | 4.0 | —N/a | —N/a | —N/a | 4.1 | 14.2 | 44.2 | **55.8** |
| | **15 Mar** | **Three former SPD deputies form JAP** | | | | | | | | | | | | | | | | | |
| CVVM | 12–13 Mar | 1,096 | 64.0 | 32.0 | 14.0 | 12.5 | 4.5 | 8.5 | 12.5 | 5.5 | 4.0 | 3.5 | —N/a | 1.0 | —N/a | 2.0 | 18.0 | **53.0** | 44.0 |
| Sanep | 14–20 Feb | 1.721 | 60.8 | 32.1 | 15.2 | 16.5 | 7.2 | 6.1 | 5.6 | 5.3 | 4.0 | 4.3 | —N/a | —N/a | —N/a | 3.7 | 15.6 | **43.8** | **52,5** |
| Kantar TNS | 9 Feb–1 Mar | 1,200 | —N/a | 31.0 | 12.5 | 17.5 | 9.5 | 6.0 | 6.5 | 4.5 | 4.0 | 5.0 | —N/a | —N/a | —N/a | 3.5 | 13.5 | 44.5 | **49.0** |
| CVVM | 2–13 Feb | 783 | 63.0 | 30.5 | 14.5 | 14.5 | 4.5 | 10.0 | 11.0 | 5.0 | 3.0 | 4.5 | 1.0 | 1.0 | —N/a | 0.5 | 20.0 | **51.5** | 46.0 |
| Median | 24 Jan–24 Feb | 1.018 | 63.0 | 33.5 | 13.0 | 13.0 | 7.0 | 7.5 | 8.0 | 6.0 | 4.0 | 5.0 | 1.0 | 1.5 | —N/a | 0.5 | 20.0 | **49.0** | 48.0 |
| Phoenix Research | 15 Jan–12 Feb | —N/a | 74.0 | 31.6 | 17.0 | 18.6 | 8.8 | 5.9 | 11.0 | 5.5 | 5.1 | 6.8 | 2.0 | 2.2 | —N/a | 19.5 | 13.0 | 48.5 | **61.8** |
| Stem | 25 Jan–6 Feb | —N/a | —N/a | 31.9 | 11.0 | 15.7 | 7.7 | 8.5 | 8.3 | 6.0 | 3.6 | 4.0 | 1.0 | 1.0 | —N/a | 0.9 | 16.2 | 47.0 | 47.0 |
| Kantar TNS | 12 Jan–2 Feb | 1,200 | 74.0 | 32.0 | 13.5 | 16.5 | 7.0 | 6.5 | 5.0 | 5.0 | 5.5 | 5.0 | —N/a | —N/a | —N/a | 4.0 | 15.5 | 43.5 | **52.5** |
| Median | 10 Dec–24 Jan | 1,129 | 63.5 | 30.0 | 15.5 | 13.5 | 8.0 | 7.5 | 9.0 | 4.5 | 4.5 | 4.5 | 1.5 | 1.0 | —N/a | 1.0 | 14.5 | 46.5 | **50.5** |
| Sanep | 17–21 Jan | 1,853 | 62.5 | 32.9 | 15.5 | 16.3 | 6.8 | 5.9 | 5.7 | 5.1 | 4.2 | 4.1 | —N/a | —N/a | —N/a | 3.5 | 16.6 | 45.6 | **49.2** |
| CVVM | 5–19 Jan | 759 | 62.0 | 31.0 | 13.0 | 15.0 | 4.0 | 9.5 | 12.5 | 5.0 | 3.0 | 3.5 | 1.0 | 1.5 | —N/a | 1.0 | 16.0 | **53.0** | 47.0 |
| 2017 election | 20–21 Oct 2017 | – | 60.8 | 29.6 | 11.3 | 10.8 | 10.6 | 7.8 | 7.3 | 5.8 | 5.3 | 5.2 | 1.6 | 1.5 | —N/a | 3.2 | 18.3 | 44.7 | **49.0** |

=== 2018 and 2017 ===
| Polling firm | Fieldwork date | Sample size | Turnout | ANO | ODS | Piráti | SPD | KSČM | ČSSD | KDU– ČSL | TOP 09 | STAN | S | Z | Oth. | Lead | Govt. + sup. | Opp. |
|---|---|---|---|---|---|---|---|---|---|---|---|---|---|---|---|---|---|---|
| Sanep | 20–26 Dec 2018 | 1,726 | 62.7 | 31.2 | 16.3 | 16.1 | 6.5 | 5.8 | 5.5 | 5.4 | 4.7 | 5.0 | —N/a | —N/a | 3.5 | 14.9 | 42.5 | **54.0** |
| CVVM | 1–13 Dec 2018 | 1,050 | 61.0 | 33.5 | 14.5 | 14.0 | 4.0 | 10.0 | 9.5 | 4.0 | 4.5 | 3.0 | 1.0 | 1.0 | 1.0 | 19.0 | **52.0** | 45.0 |
| Median | 10 Nov–9 Dec 2018 | 1,056 | 60.5 | 29.5 | 13.5 | 13.0 | 10.0 | 7.0 | 7.5 | 5.5 | 5.0 | 6.0 | 1.5 | 0.5 | 1.0 | 16.0 | 44.0 | **53.0** |
| Phoenix Research | 20 Nov–8 Dec 2018 | 1,018 | 53.9 | 29.7 | 14.2 | 14.1 | 6.3 | 4.9 | 6.1 | 5.1 | 3.0 | 3.5 | 0.4 | 0.0 | 12.7 | 15.5 | 40.9 | **46.2** |
| STEM | 19–30 Nov 2018 | 1,034 | 55.0 | 35.7 | 12.4 | 13.1 | 6.9 | 7.6 | 6.6 | 5.1 | 4.9 | 4.6 | 1.5 | 0.8 | 0.8 | 22.6 | **49.9** | 49.3 |
| Sanep | 22–28 Nov 2018 | 1,857 | 60.5 | 30.1 | 16.8 | 15.5 | 7.2 | 6.1 | 5.0 | 5.2 | 4.8 | 5.3 | —N/a | —N/a | 4.0 | 13.3 | 41.2 | **54.8** |
| Kantar TNS | 3–25 Nov 2018 | 1,200 | —N/a | 32.5 | 16.0 | 19.0 | 5.5 | 6.0 | 5.0 | 4.5 | 4.0 | 5.5 | —N/a | —N/a | 2.0 | 13.5 | 43.5 | **54.5** |
| | **12–13 Nov 2018** | **2018 Czech political crisis begins** | | | | | | | | | | | | | | | | |
| CVVM (Note: The researcher claims that the poll does not reflect consequences of the crisis, as 96 % of answers were given before its outbreak.) | 3–15 Nov 2018 | 1,104 | 60.0 | 29.5 | 14.5 | 14.0 | 7.5 | 10.0 | 9.0 | 5.0 | 3.0 | 4.0 | —N/a | 1.0 | 2.5 | 15.0 | **48.5** | 48.0 |
| Phoenix Research | 20 Oct–7 Nov 2018 | 1,018 | 51.5 | 24.9 | 14.7 | 13.2 | 7.8 | 5.5 | 5.0 | 5.1 | 3.1 | 4.0 | 0.5 | 0.5 | 15.7 | 10.2 | 35.4 | **47.9** |
| CVVM | 13–26 Oct 2018 | 1,001 | 61.0 | 30.0 | 19.0 | 11.0 | 5.0 | 8.5 | 9.0 | 7.0 | 3.0 | 4.0 | —N/a | —N/a | 3.0 | 11.0 | 47.5 | **49.0** |
| Kantar TNS | 6–26 Oct 2018 | 1,200 | —N/a | 27.0 | 14.0 | 16.0 | 7.5 | 6.5 | 5.5 | 6.0 | 5.0 | 7.0 | —N/a | 2.0 | 3.5 | 11.0 | 39.0 | **55.5** |
| Median | 25 Sep – 25 Oct 2018 | 1,097 | 64.5 | 28.5 | 12.0 | 12.0 | 9.0 | 8.5 | 9.5 | 5.0 | 5.5 | 5.5 | 1.5 | 1.0 | 2.0 | 14.5 | 46.5 | **49.0** |
| STEM | 9–24 Oct 2018 | 1,011 | 57.0 | 33.4 | 12.9 | 12.6 | 9.6 | 7.4 | 6.7 | 6.4 | 2.1 | 5.3 | 0.5 | 1.1 | 1.5 | 20.5 | 47.5 | **49.9** |
| Sanep | 22 Oct 2018 | 1,200 | 61.3 | 27.6 | 15.9 | 14.7 | 9.7 | 6.5 | 4.9 | 5.6 | 5.9 | 5.4 | —N/a | —N/a | 3.8 | 11.7 | 39.0 | **57.2** |
| | **12–13 Oct 2018** | **2nd round of 2018 Senate election** | | | | | | | | | | | | | | | | |
| Phoenix Research | 1–10 Oct 2018 | 1,062 | 53.0 | 24.5 | 15.0 | 13.8 | 7.2 | 5.2 | 5.2 | 5.3 | 3.1 | 4.1 | 1.0 | 1.0 | 14.6 | 9.5 | 34.9 | **48.5** |
| | **5–6 Oct 2018** | **2018 municipal elections and 1st round of 2018 Senate election** | | | | | | | | | | | | | | | | |
| TNS Kantar | 1–21 Sep 2018 | 1,200 | —N/a | 29.5 | 13.0 | 15.5 | 9.0 | 5.5 | 7.0 | 5.0 | 4.0 | 5.5 | —N/a | 2.0 | 4.0 | 14.0 | 42.0 | **52.0** |
| CVVM | 8–20 Sep 2018 | 1,037 | 63.0 | 30.0 | 14.0 | 13.0 | 5.0 | 10.5 | 12.0 | 4.5 | 4.0 | 4.0 | 1.0 | 1.0 | 1.0 | 16.0 | **52.5** | 44.5 |
| Sanep | 6–12 Sep 2018 | 1,836 | 62.4 | 28.1 | 13.1 | 13.9 | 12.7 | 7.2 | 6.4 | 5.1 | 5.2 | 5.0 | —N/a | —N/a | 1.5 | 14.8 | 41.7 | **55.0** |
| Median | 25 Jul–28 Aug 2018 | —N/a | 63.0 | 31.0 | 14.0 | 10.5 | 8.0 | 9.0 | 8.5 | 5.5 | 5.5 | 3.5 | 1.5 | 2.0 | 1.5 | 17.0 | **48.5** | 47.0 |
| TNS Kantar | 4–26 Aug 2018 | 1,200 | 71.0 | 28.0 | 13.0 | 15.0 | 8.0 | 8.0 | 6.5 | 5.5 | 5.0 | 6.5 | —N/a | —N/a | 4.5 | 13.0 | 42.5 | **53.0** |
| Sanep | 9–15 Aug 2018 | 15,159 | 61.5 | 29.1 | 13.5 | 13.1 | 12.7 | 7.0 | 7.5 | 5.2 | 3.5 | 5.1 | —N/a | —N/a | 3.3 | 15.6 | 43.6 | **53.1** |
| Median | 27 Jun–23 Jul 2018 | 1,235 | 62.5 | 30.0 | 14.0 | 11.5 | 8.5 | 8.5 | 8.5 | 5.5 | 5.0 | 4.0 | 1.5 | 2.5 | 0.5 | 16.0 | 47.0 | **48.5** |
| CVVM | 16–29 Jun 2018 | 1,046 | 62.0 | 31.0 | 14.0 | 10.0 | 6.5 | 10.5 | 11.0 | 6.0 | 4.5 | 4.5 | —N/a | 1.0 | 1.0 | 17.0 | **52.5** | 45.5 |
| | **27 Jun 2018** | **Andrej Babiš' Second Cabinet formed.** | | | | | | | | | | | | | | | | |
| STEM | 13–27 Jun 2018 | 1,007 | 58.0 | 32.0 | 15.5 | 10.2 | 8.6 | 9.1 | 7.9 | 6.3 | 4.9 | 2.7 | 1.9 | 0.6 | 0.3 | 16.5 | **49.0** | 48.2 |
| Median | 25 May – 26 Jun 2018 | 1,141 | 61.5 | 31.5 | 12.5 | 11.5 | 8.5 | 8.0 | 9.0 | 4.5 | 6.0 | 4.0 | 1.0 | 2.0 | 1.5 | 19.0 | **48.5** | 47.0 |
| Phoenix Research | 18–24 Jun 2018 | 1,016 | —N/a | 25.5 | 11.1 | 12.1 | 8.6 | 9.6 | 5.4 | 4.3 | 3.0 | 2.6 | 2.1 | 1.4 | 4.3 | 13.4 | 40.5 | **41.7** |
| TNS Kantar | 2–22 Jun 2018 | 1,200 | —N/a | 28.5 | 15.5 | 12.5 | 9.5 | 8.0 | 7.0 | 5.0 | 3.5 | 5.5 | —N/a | 2.0 | 3.5 | 13.0 | 43.5 | **51.5** |
| Sanep | 7–13 Jun 2018 | 18,912 | 62.4 | 28.2 | 13.5 | 14.2 | 12.4 | 7.1 | 6.8 | 5.3 | 4.0 | 5.0 | —N/a | —N/a | 3.5 | 14.0 | 42.1 | **54.7** |
| TNS Kantar | 12 May–1 Jun 2018 | 1,200 | 74.0 | 27.0 | 16.0 | 14.5 | 9.0 | 7.5 | 7.0 | 4.0 | 5.0 | 5.5 | —N/a | —N/a | 4.5 | 11.0 | 41.5 | **54.0** |
| CVVM | 12–24 May 2018 | 1,008 | 63.0 | 29.0 | 13.0 | 11.0 | 7.5 | 10.5 | 13.0 | 5.5 | 3.0 | 4.5 | 1.0 | 1.0 | 1.0 | 16.0 | **52.5** | 44.5 |
| Sanep | 17–23 May 2018 | 18,867 | 61.8 | 28.9 | 13.8 | 13.9 | 12.2 | 6.8 | 6.7 | 5.5 | 4.0 | 5.1 | —N/a | —N/a | 3.1 | 15.0 | 42.4 | **54.5** |
| Median | 10 Apr–5 May 2018 | 1,224 | 60.0 | 30.5 | 14.0 | 11.5 | 9.0 | 8.5 | 8.0 | 5.5 | 6.0 | 4.0 | 1.0 | 1.5 | 0.5 | 16.5 | 47.0 | **50.0** |
| Median | 15 Nov–3 May 2018 | 5,781 | —N/a | 30.5 | 13.0 | 12.0 | 9.5 | 8.5 | 7.5 | 5.5 | 5.5 | 5.0 | —N/a | —N/a | 4.0 | 17.5 | 46.5 | **50.5** |
| STEM | 19-29 Apr 2018 | 1,046 | 58.0 | 32.9 | 13.7 | 13.5 | 9.0 | 8.5 | 7.0 | 5.4 | 3.9 | 3.9 | 0.8 | 0.8 | 0.6 | 19.2 | 48.4 | **49.4** |
| TNS Kantar | 7-27 Apr 2018 | 887 | —N/a | 30.5 | 14.5 | 14.5 | 8.0 | 8.0 | 6.5 | 5.5 | 4.0 | 5.5 | —N/a | —N/a | 3.0 | 16.0 | 45.0 | **52.0** |
| Sanep | 19-25 Apr 2018 | 2,319 | 61.3 | 28.6 | 13.6 | 13.2 | 12.1 | 6.7 | 7.2 | 5.3 | 4.1 | 5.4 | —N/a | —N/a | 3.8 | 15.0 | 42.5 | **54.4** |
| CVVM | 7-19 Apr 2018 | 1,115 | 58.0 | 29.0 | 13.5 | 12.5 | 7.5 | 10.0 | 11.5 | 6.5 | 4.5 | 3.0 | —N/a | 1.0 | 1.0 | 15.5 | **50.5** | 47.5 |
| TNS Kantar | 10-29 Mar 2018 | 847 | 73.0 | 29.5 | 14.0 | 13.5 | 7.5 | 6.5 | 8.5 | 5.0 | 4.5 | 6.0 | —N/a | 2.0 | 3.0 | 15.5 | 44.5 | **50.5** |
| Sanep | 22-28 Mar 2018 | 2,473 | 62.7 | 30.7 | 12.3 | 12.8 | 11.7 | 7.1 | 6.9 | 5.4 | 4.2 | 5.2 | —N/a | —N/a | 3.7 | 17.9 | 44.7 | **51.6** |
| Médea Research | 6–21 Mar 2018 | 1,003 | —N/a | 32.2 | 10.2 | 16.7 | 7.1 | 5.6 | 9.0 | 4.7 | 4.2 | 6.5 | 2.1 | 1.1 | —N/a | 15.5 | 46.8 | **49.4** |
| CVVM | 3–15 Mar 2018 | 1,061 | 64.0 | 30.5 | 12.5 | 12.5 | 6.5 | 11.0 | 11.0 | 4.5 | 4.5 | 4.5 | 1.0 | 1.0 | 0.5 | 18.0 | **52.5** | 45.0 |
| TNS Kantar | 3–23 Feb 2018 | 1,200 | 73.7 | 33.0 | 12.0 | 12.5 | 8.5 | 6.5 | 7.5 | 5.0 | 4.5 | 4.5 | —N/a | —N/a | 6.0 | 20.5 | 47.0 | 47.0 |
| Sanep | 15–21 Feb 2018 | 2,329 | 61.8 | 32.1 | 10.8 | 12.1 | 11.3 | 6.9 | 7.5 | 5.8 | 4.5 | 5.4 | —N/a | —N/a | 3.6 | 20.0 | 46.5 | **49.9** |
| | **18 Feb 2018** | **Jan Hamáček becomes leader of ČSSD** | | | | | | | | | | | | | | | | |
| CVVM | 3–15 Feb 2018 | 812 | 64.0 | 33.5 | 10.5 | 13.0 | 6.5 | 10.0 | 12.0 | 3.5 | 3.5 | 3.0 | 1.0 | 1.0 | 2.5 | 20.5 | **55.5** | 40.0 |
| STEM | 1–8 Feb 2018 | 1,028 | 62.0 | 32.5 | 11.0 | 13.3 | 9.5 | 8.7 | 7.1 | 5.2 | 4.6 | 4.0 | 1.5 | 1.1 | 1.5 | 19.2 | **48.3** | 47.6 |
| CVVM | 15–24 Jan 2018 | 1,068 | 66.0 | 30.5 | 12 | 12.5 | 7.5 | 8 | 12.5 | 5 | 4 | 3 | 1.5 | 1.5 | 2 | 18 | **51.0** | 44.0 |
| CVVM | 2–17 Dec 2017 | 715 | 61.0 | 35.5 | 11.5 | 11.5 | 6.5 | 7.5 | 10 | 6.5 | 4.5 | 4 | —N/a | —N/a | 2.5 | 24 | **53.0** | 44.5 |
| | **13 Dec 2017** | **Andrej Babiš' First Cabinet formed.** | | | | | | | | | | | | | | | | |
| STEM | 1–11 Dec 2017 | 1,027 | 62.0 | 33.0 | 9.6 | 12.2 | 8.7 | 8.8 | 8.0 | 5.4 | 4.4 | 5.2 | —N/a | 0.9 | 3.8 | 20.8 | **49.8** | 45.5 |
| | **26 Nov 2017** | **Jiří Pospíšil becomes leader of TOP 09** | | | | | | | | | | | | | | | | |
| TNS Kantar | 4–24 Nov 2017 | 1,200 | 74.2 | 30 | 12 | 14 | 9.5 | 7 | 5.5 | 4.5 | 5 | 5.5 | —N/a | 3.0 | 4 | 16 | 42.5 | **50.5** |
| 2017 election | 20–21 Oct 2017 | – | 60.8 | 29.6 | 11.3 | 10.8 | 10.6 | 7.8 | 7.3 | 5.8 | 5.3 | 5.2 | 1.6 | 1.5 | 3.2 | 18.3 | 44.7 | **49.0** |

== Seats ==
=== 2021 ===
| Polling firm | Fieldwork date | ANO | ODS | Piráti | SPD | KSČM | ČSSD | KDU– ČSL | TOP 09 | STAN | S | Z | Govt. + sup. | Opp. |
|---|---|---|---|---|---|---|---|---|---|---|---|---|---|---|
| Kantar CZ | February - March 2021 | 54 | 21 | 49 | 26 | 10 | 0 | 0 | 13 | 27 | —N/a | —N/a | 64 | 136 |

=== 2017–2020 ===
| Polling firm | Fieldwork date | ANO | ODS | Piráti | SPD | KSČM | ČSSD | KDU– ČSL | TOP 09 | STAN | S | Z | Govt. + sup. | Opp. |
|---|---|---|---|---|---|---|---|---|---|---|---|---|---|---|
| Kantar CZ | April–June 2020 | 86 | 27 | 42 | 12 | 7 | 8 | 0 | 10 | 8 | —N/a | —N/a | 101 | 99 |
| Sanep | 14–20 Mar 2019 | 71 | 27 | 39 | 22 | 15 | 14 | 12 | 0 | 0 | 0 | 0 | 100 | 100 |
| Sanep | 17–23 Jan 2019 | 75 | 35 | 37 | 15 | 13 | 13 | 12 | 0 | 0 | 0 | 0 | 101 | 99 |
| STEM | 9–24 Oct 2018 | 83 | 27 | 26 | 20 | 15 | 12 | 12 | 0 | 5 | 0 | 0 | 110 | 90 |
| Sanep | 22 Oct 2018 | 61 | 35 | 32 | 21 | 14 | 0 | 12 | 13 | 12 | 0 | 0 | 75 | 125 |
| Sanep | 9–15 Aug 2018 | 63 | 29 | 28 | 27 | 15 | 16 | 11 | 0 | 11 | 0 | 0 | 94 | 106 |
| STEM | 13–27 Jun 2018 | 83 | 37 | 22 | 18 | 16 | 16 | 8 | 0 | 0 | 0 | 0 | 115 | 85 |
| TNS Kantar | 2-22 Jun 2018 | 76 | 36 | 27 | 20 | 13 | 15 | 6 | 0 | 7 | 0 | 0 | 104 | 96 |
| Sanep | 12 May-1 Jun 2018 | 61 | 29 | 31 | 27 | 15 | 15 | 11 | 0 | 11 | 0 | 0 | 91 | 109 |
| TNS Kantar | 12 May-1 June 2018 | 73 | 36 | 33 | 18 | 14 | 13 | 0 | 6 | 7 | 0 | 0 | 100 | 100 |
| CVVM | 12–24 May 2018 | 71 | 31 | 25 | 13 | 21 | 31 | 8 | 0 | 0 | 0 | 0 | 123 | 77 |
| Sanep | 17–23 May 2018 | 62 | 30 | 30 | 26 | 15 | 14 | 12 | 0 | 11 | 0 | 0 | 91 | 109 |
| STEM | 19-29 Apr 2018 | 85 | 32 | 29 | 17 | 16 | 14 | 7 | 0 | 0 | 0 | 0 | 115 | 85 |
| TNS Kantar | 7-27 Apr 2018 | 79 | 34 | 34 | 15 | 15 | 11 | 6 | 0 | 6 | 0 | 0 | 105 | 95 |
| Sanep | 19-25 Apr 2018 | 62 | 30 | 29 | 26 | 14 | 16 | 11 | 0 | 12 | 0 | 0 | 92 | 108 |
| CVVM | 7–19 Apr 2018 | 71 | 31 | 29 | 13 | 20 | 25 | 11 | 0 | 0 | 0 | 0 | 116 | 84 |
| TNS Kantar | 10–29 Mar 2018 | 73 | 34 | 33 | 15 | 11 | 18 | 7 | 0 | 9 | 0 | 0 | 102 | 98 |
| Sanep | 22–28 Mar 2018 | 67 | 27 | 28 | 25 | 15 | 15 | 12 | 0 | 11 | 0 | 0 | 97 | 103 |
| TNS Kantar | 3–23 Feb 2018 | 87 | 29 | 32 | 20 | 14 | 15 | 7 | 0 | 0 | 0 | 0 | 116 | 84 |
| Sanep | 15–21 Feb 2018 | 70 | 24 | 26 | 24 | 15 | 16 | 13 | 0 | 12 | 0 | 0 | 101 | 99 |
| 2017 election | 20–21 Oct 2017 | 78 | 25 | 22 | 22 | 15 | 15 | 10 | 7 | 6 | 0 | 0 | 108 | 92 |

== Other surveys ==
| Polling firm | Fieldwork date | Sample size | Turnout | ANO | SPOLU | | | Piráti+STAN | | SPD | KSČM | ČSSD | T–S–SsČR | | Z | VB | PSH | Oth. | Lead | Govt. + sup. (Note: Communist Party of Bohemia and Moravia until 13 April 2021.) | Opp. |
| Polling firm | Fieldwork date | Sample size | Turnout | ANO | ODS | KDU– ČSL | TOP 09 | Piráti | STAN | SPD | KSČM | ČSSD | S | T | Z | VB | PSH | Oth. | Lead | Govt. + sup. | Opp. |
|---|---|---|---|---|---|---|---|---|---|---|---|---|---|---|---|---|---|---|---|---|---|
| Charles University | 9 Oct 2021 | | —N/a | 21 | 25.5 | | | 22 | | 9.3 | 3.2 | 3.7 | 3.8 | | —N/a | —N/a | 5.3 | 6.2 | 3.5 | 24.7 | 56.8 |
| STEM (two positive votes and one negative vote available) | 2-13 Sep 2021 | 1,008 | —N/a | 18.7 | 21.0 | | | 2.4 | | 14.3 | -1.0 | 18.3 | 7.9 | | 8.0 | 1.9 | 8.7 | 11.4 | 2.3 | 36.0 | 70.7 |
| STEM two votes available) | 2-13 Sep 2021 | 1,008 | —N/a | 35.1 | 29.3 | | | 25.9 | | 19.7 | 10.8 | 19.8 | 9.1 | | 8.8 | 2.1 | 5.7 | 11.7 | 5.9 | 65.7 | 98.5 |
| Student election | 21 Sept 2021 | | | 8.5 | 29.4 | | | 30.4 | | 4.0 | 2.3 | 2.4 | 1.9 | | 7.1 | 3.3 | 2.0 | 8.7 | 1.0 | 12.7 | 70.8 |
