= 2017 TOP 09 leadership election =

- 26 November 2017
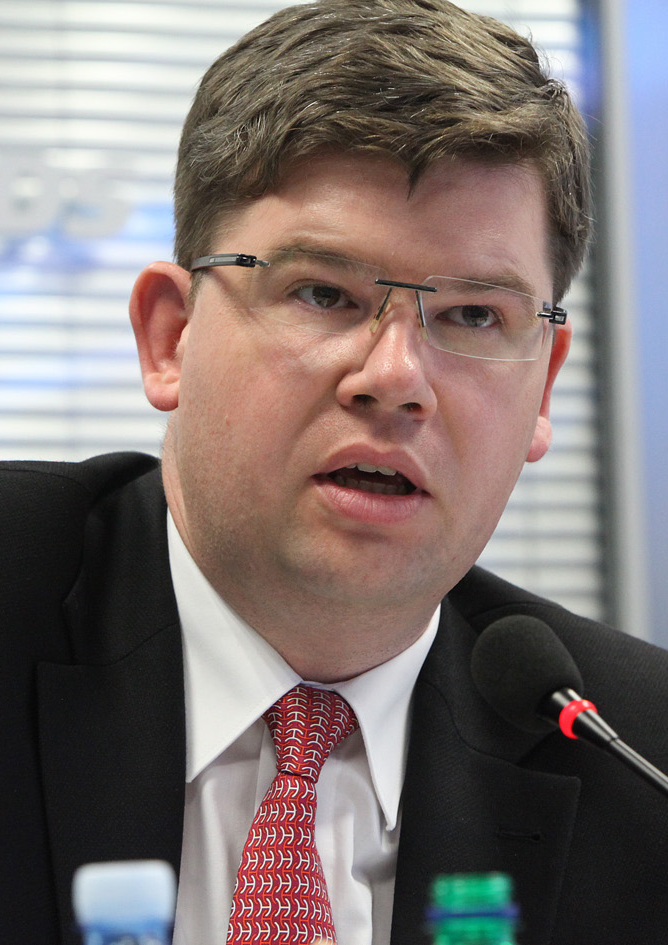

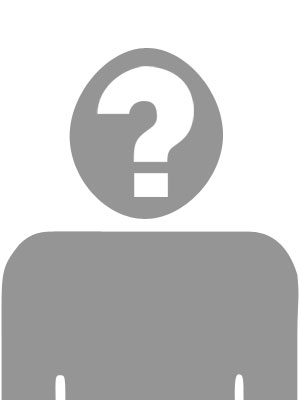
Nominee	Jiří Pospíšil	Pavel Němec
Electoral vote	147	13
Percentage	83.05%	7.34%
Leader of TOP 09 before election
Miroslav Kalousek
Elected Leader of TOP 09
Jiří Pospíšil

The Czech political party TOP 09 held a leadership election on 26 November 2017, following the party's poor result in the 2017 Czech legislative election. Jiří Pospíšil was elected as the new leader.

== Background ==
Miroslav Kalousek was elected leader in 2015. His term expired in November 2017. It was speculated that the outcome of the election would depend on the party's result in the 2017 legislative election. Kalousek said that he would resign if the party achieved a poor result in the election.

The party was heavily defeated and received only 5%. Speculation about possible successors to Kalousek started, centring on Markéta Pekarová Adamová and Jiří Pospíšil. On 24 October 2017, Kalousek announced that he would not seek reelection.

== Campaign ==
Pekarová Adamová said she was considering running and that she would decide within a week, eventually deciding not to run, to focus on her family instead. Ludmila Štvánová announced her candidacy on 3 November 2017. On 4 November 2017, MEP Luděk Niedermayer joined the party, provoking speculation about his possible candidacy. Jakub Lepš, whose candidacy was suggested by Karel Schwarzenberg, admitted that he could run.

On 4 November 2017, the Prague branch of TOP 09 nominated Jiří Pospíšil for party leader. Pospíšil later confirmed his candidacy. He also received support from regional branches in Plzeň, South Moravia and Hradec Králové. By 25 November 2017, Pospíšil was the only official candidate, with Štvánová having failed to receive any nominations. On 26 November 2017, Pavel Němec announced his candidacy.

The election was held on 26 November 2017. Pospíšil received 147 votes of 177 and became the new leader. Němec received 13 votes.

== Candidates ==
- Pavel Němec, Prostějov councillor and businessman. He announced his candidacy on 26 November 2017.
- Jiří Pospíšil, MEP. He stated that he intended to join the party, leading to speculation he might run for leader. Following the legislative election some prominent party members announced they would nominate Pospíšil for the position of leader. He announced his candidacy on 4 November 2017.
- Ludmila Štvánová, announced her candidacy on 3 November 2017. She failed to receive any nominations for the position.

=== Declined ===
- Tomáš Czernin, Senator. Mentioned as a possible candidate.
- Miroslav Kalousek, incumbent leader. He announced on 24 October 2017 that he would not run for reelection.
- Jakub Lepš, Deputy Mayor of Prague. Karel Schwarzenberg suggested him as a candidate, but he decided to not run.
- Luděk Niedermayer, MEP. Mentioned as a possible candidate, but stated on 4 November that he would not run.
- Markéta Pekarová Adamová, MP. She was suggested as a possible candidate. On 24 October 2017 she stated that she was considering running, but on 26 October 2017 announced that she would not run.
- Marek Ženíšek, MP and Deputy leader. He was suggested by Vít Peštuka as a possible candidate, but endorsed Pospíšil.

== Results ==
Candidate	Votes	%
Jiří Pospíšil	147	83.05
Pavel Němec	13	7.34
Against	17	9.6
Total	177	100
