= 2018 Czech political crisis =

The Czech political crisis in 2018 started when Seznam News published an interview with Andrej Babiš Jr., son of Czech Prime Minister Andrej Babiš. Babiš Jr. stated, that his father's people kidnapped him in Crimea and kept him there.

== History ==
Journalists of Seznam News, Sabina Slonková and Jiří Kubík, found Andrej Babiš Jr. in Switzerland, where he was living with his mother. They interviewed him. Babiš Jr. participated in his father's business involving farm Stork's Nest (Čapí hnízdo). He stated that he was kidnapped by his father's people in 2016, when Stork's Nest was investigated by the European Anti-Fraud Office, and then kept in Crimea. He stated that his father's employees threatened him. He noted that he was sent to the National Institute of Mental Health. Babiš Jr.'s mental illness was diagnosed by Dita Protopopová, a member of the Prague 8 Municipal assembly, who was also chosen by ANO 2011 as a candidate for mayor. She resigned her mandate when the interview was published.

Opposition parties expressed shock at reports that Andrej Babiš had had his son kidnapped. Leader of the Civic Democratic Party Petr Fiala organized a meeting with leaders of other opposition parties, namely Czech Pirate Party, Freedom and Direct Democracy, Christian and Democratic Union – Czechoslovak People's Party, TOP 09 and Mayors and Independents to discuss their approach. The opposition then called for Babiš' resignation and decided to propose a motion of no-confidence against him. The Czech opposition had 92 MPs of 200. 101 MPs are needed for a successful motion of no-confidence. The then-leader of the Czech Social Democratic Party Jan Hamáček didn't rule out the possibility of his party leaving the coalition government.

Andrej Babiš, who was, at the time, in Palermo, stated that his son was mentally ill and called the interview a "disgusting attack" on his family. He stated that he considered it a campaign against his persona. He refuted the accusation that his son was kidnapped. Server Parlamentní Listy reported that the interview caused inner turmoil within Babiš' party ANO 2011, as its members were banned from talking about the affair with journalists. Some reports considered it possible that Babiš might be replaced by Richard Brabec as the prime minister. However, Babiš announced on his Facebook page that he would "Never resign" and that "Everyone would do well to remember that"

On November 13, ODS, Pirates, KDU-CŠL, TOP 09, and STAN agreed that they would vote in favor of the no-confidence vote (totalling 70 votes), while ANO would vote against it (78 votes). ČSSD, a junior coalition partner of the ANO-led government, KSČM, a party that provides support for the government, and SPD, an opposition party, who was in favor of the idea of a no-confidence vote, took an undecided approach (52 votes). On November 15, Babiš and ANO had negotiations with SPD, KSČM, and ČSSD. The SPD leader, Tomio Okamura, said that he and his party would vote against the no-confidence vote if ČSSD left the coalition. Okamura said that his party couldn't join the coalition due to the unresolved case about the kidnapping of his son, but he said he would consider the confidence and supply arrangement with KSČM. Okamura also stated the desire of two concessions, which were the implementation of an SPD-program in the government and the change of certain policies implemented by the ANO-ČSSD government. Negotiations would continue between Okamura, Filip, and Hamaček before the no-confidence vote.

On November 15, President Miloš Zeman announced that Babiš would stay in the position of PM no matter the result of the no-confidence vote, as he would simply reappoint him, again with intent of letting him govern without confidence. He also called the interview a "disgusting hyenism", citing his personal resentment against Slonková.

On November 17, Andrej Babiš travelled to Switzerland, to talk to his son and ex-wife. Police and state attorneys were not afraid that he might attempt to influence them (it is a crime to influence witnesses in the Czech Republic), and did not even propose any countermeasures, such as prohibiting him from meeting them. The police instead focused on a case of flowers put by Babiš as a tribute to the Velvet revolution being thrown into a trash bin by a protestor, which also attracted considerable attention of Babiš' supporters.

On November 18, Beata Babišová, mother of Babiš Jr. and ex-wife of Babiš Sr. posted a video online, where she asked journalists to "leave her family alone" and also called her son insane. Earlier, Babiš Jr. claimed that his mother tried to silence him, and that his father had forced her to do so. Nevertheless, Babiš Jr. later stopped communicating entirely.

On November 19, there was a fire in the Czech National Institute of Mental Health, where Dita Protopopová worked and where Babiš Jr. was originally declared insane, prompting many to theorize whether the fire was set on purpose to destroy evidence.

On November 20, PM Babiš met with the leader of Communist Party of Bohemia and Moravia, who provided his government with confidence. After the event, Babiš left without talking to present journalists, and KSČM announced that they would vote against the motion of no-confidence. On the same day, Dita Protopopová, who originally declared his [Babiš's] son insane, which effectively prevented him from testifying in the case of Čapí hnízdo, left her job at the Czech National Institute of Mental Health.

On November 21, leadership of ČSSD announced that their deputies would leave the chamber for the vote and not take part in it (abstention from voting counts as voting against the motion, as a motion of no-confidence requires majority of all deputies to pass), but also announced that they would support a potential self dissolution of the Chamber of Deputies and therefore the triggering of snap elections. This would take 120 out of 200 deputies.

On November 23, it was announced the opposition had lost the no-confidence vote.

== Motion of no-confidence ==
2018 vote of no confidence in the government of Andrej Babiš
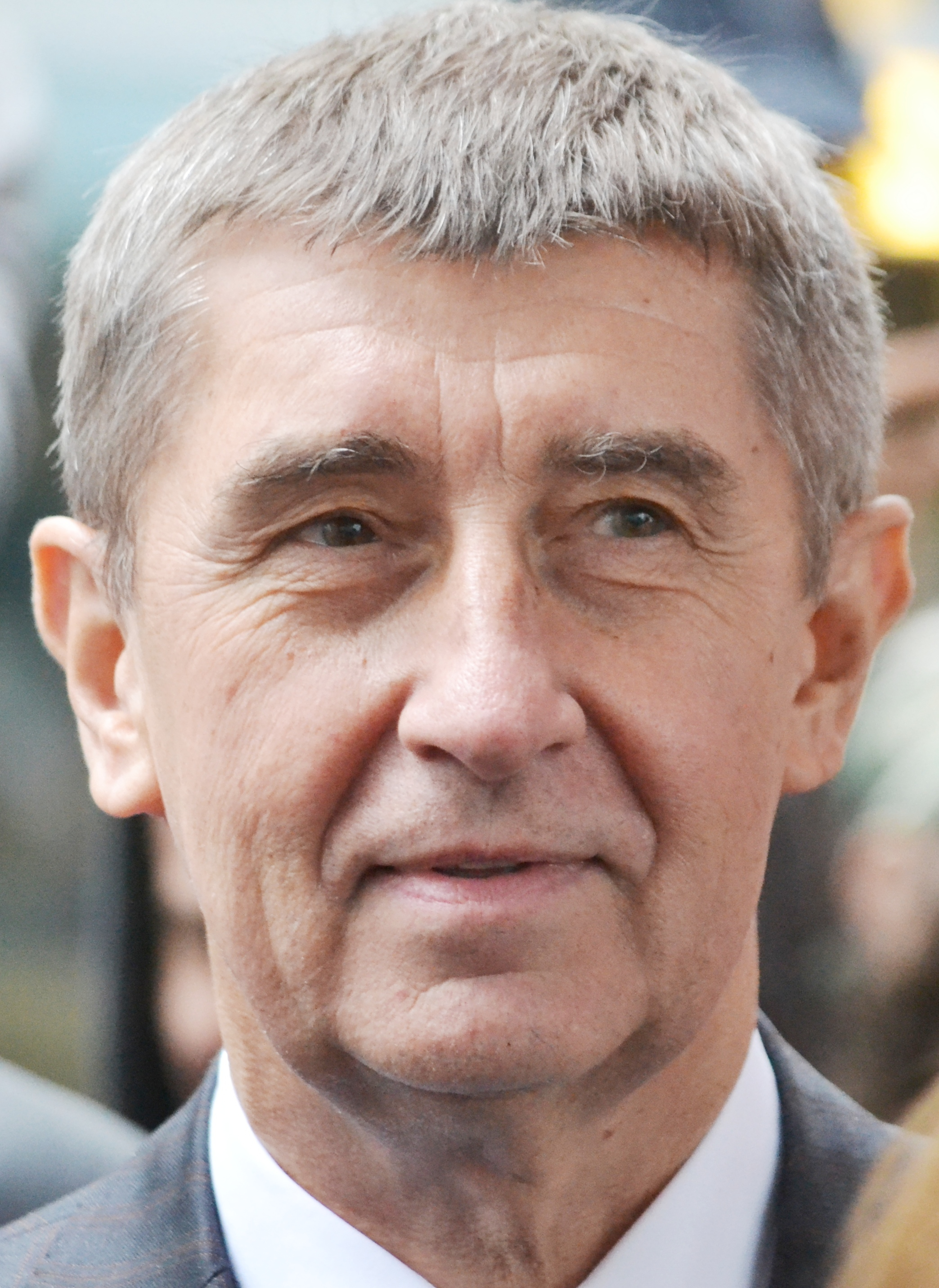
- Prime minister Andrej Babis was trying to garner the support from other political parties to vote in favor of him staying in government.
- Date: Possibly on November 23rd
- Location: Chamber of Deputies, Czech Republic
- Cause: The alleged kidnapping of the PM’s son to Crimea, allegedly ordered by PM Babiš.
- Participants: ANO; ODS; Piráti; SPD; KSČM; ČSSD; KDU-ČSL; TOP 09; STAN
- Outcome: Government upheld

=== Support ===
Party position (as of 19 November) Required votes: 101 out of 200
Vote	Parties	Refs
Yes 92	ODS (25); Piráti (22); KDU-ČSL (10); TOP 09 (7); STAN (6); SPD (22)	
Won't participate 15	ČSSD (15)	
No 93	ANO (78); KSČM (15)	

=== Vote ===
Motion of no-confidence Petr Fiala (ODS)
Ballot →	182
Required majority →	101 out of 200
Yes	92 / 200
No	90 / 200
Abstentions	0 / 200
Absentees	18 / 200
