= Otakar Švec =

Czech sculptor (1892–1955)

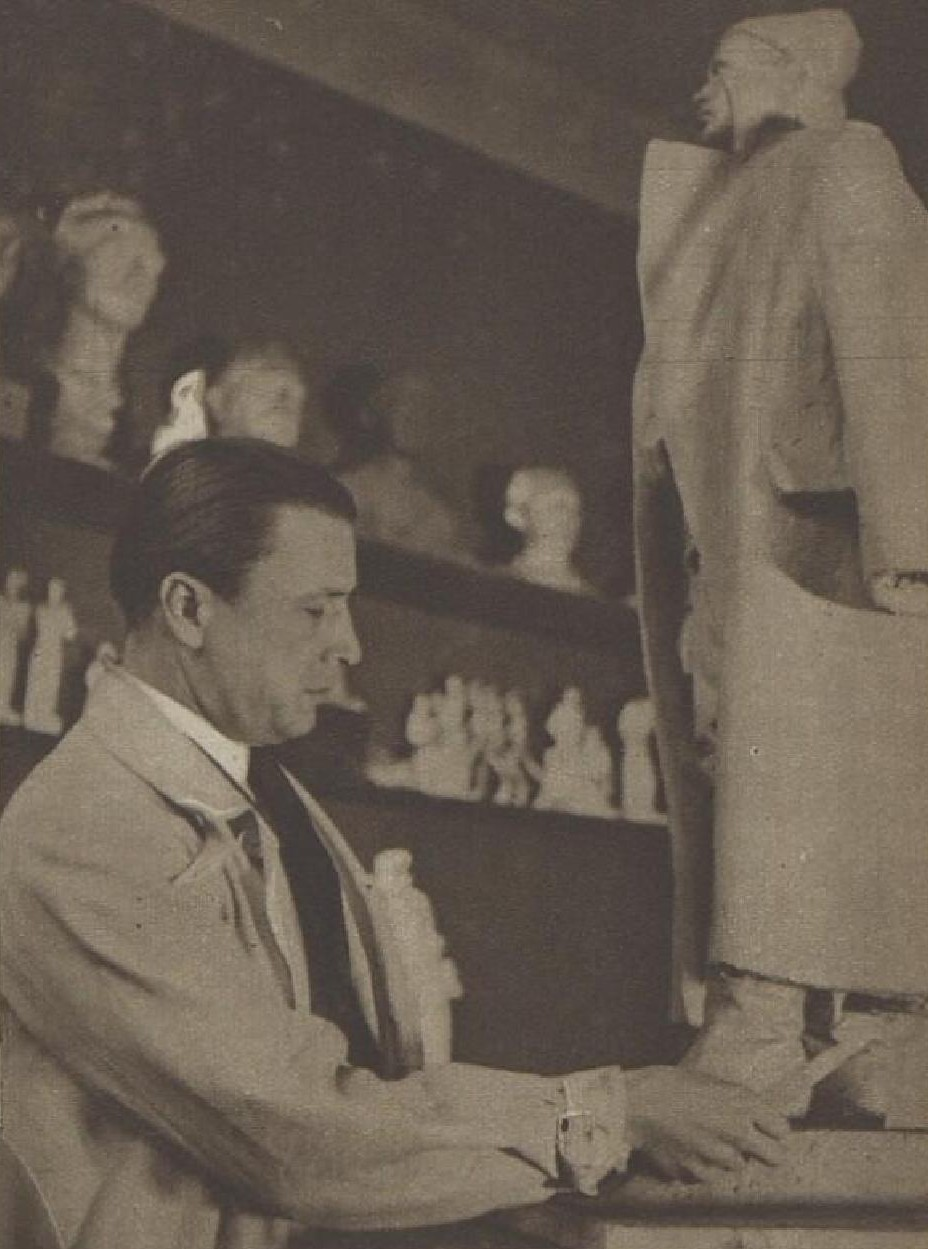
Otakar Švec sculpting in his workshop

Otakar Švec (23 November 1892, in Prague-New Town – 3 March 1955, in Prague) was a Czechoslovak sculptor best known for his colossal granite Monument to Stalin in Prague.

== Career ==
A pupil of Josef Václav Myslbek and Jan Štursa, Švec had produced the important 1924 Futurist sculpture Sunbeam Motorcycle, now in the National Gallery in Prague, and at least three major public monuments to Tomáš Masaryk, Jan Hus, and Franklin Delano Roosevelt. The first two were destroyed by the Germans during World War II.

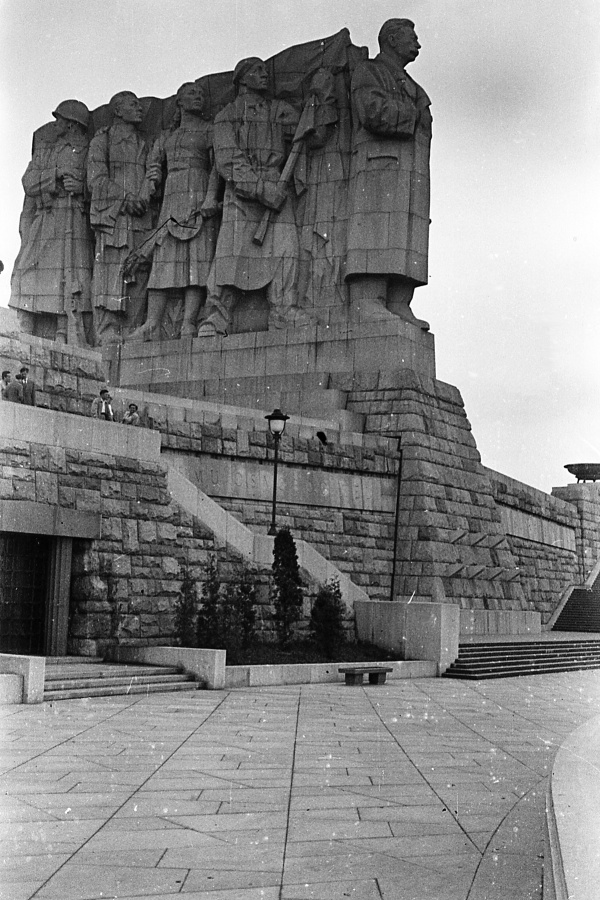
Gigantic (15 metres high) monument by Otakar Švec in honour of Joseph Stalin in Prague-Letná. It was finished in 1955, two years after Stalin's death and destroyed in November 1962

Švec entered the competition for the Stalin Monument in 1949, not expecting to win. The sculpture was unveiled on May Day, 1955. Švec, horrified by his own creation, had killed himself days before it was officially unveiled.

This world's largest representation of Stalin, dominating the city, stood for only seven years before the political climate changed. It was brought down in October 1962 with 800 kilograms (1,800 lb) of dynamite.

== Sources ==
- Figuration/Abstraction: Strategies for Public Sculpture in Europe 1945-1968, by Charlotte Benton
- source on a recent show of Švec's work
