= Radio 1 (Czech Republic) =

- Prague; Czech Republic
- Frequency: 91.9 MHz

Programming
- Language: Czech

Ownership
- Owner: Radio United Broadcasting s.r.o.

Links
- Website: www.radio1.cz

Radio 1 is a Czech alternative music radio station based in Prague. It originated as Radio Stalin, an unlicensed station launched on 19 October 1990 during the exhibition beneath the former Stalin Monument at Letná. It's been described as the first independent private radio broadcast in the Czech lands after the fall of communism.

After its transmitter was confiscated, the station resumed broadcasting in February 1991 as Radio Ultra. It received an private broadcasting licence the following month and adopted the name Radio 1 on 25 March 1991. It's a freeform radio, and its broadcast include alternative and minority music genres. It is available on FM in Prague, Plzeň, Liberec and České Budějovice, as well as nationally through DAB+.

== Programming ==
Radio 1 focuses on alternative and independent music, with programmes covering electronic music, rock, jazz, reggae, ambient and world music. Presenters have considerable freedom to choose the music they play, particularly outside daytime hours, giving the station a less standardized sound than most commercial radio stations.

The schedule includes both general music programming and specialist shows. Long-running programmes include Velká sedma, a chart devoted to Czech and Slovak music; Hitparáda Radia 1, the station's general music chart; Shadowbox, which focuses on drum and bass; and Reggae Klub featuring reggae. The schedule also features Blue Train, a specialist jazz and blues programme; Všechny hudby světa, focused on world music; and CD Nonstop, which plays a complete album without interruptions.

The station has also produced a number of notable former programmes. Film o páté established by in 1993 later developed into the film-review programme Odvážné palce. The electronic-music programme Vibrátor, which began in 2008 and ran until 2013, was accompanied by club events.
