= Letná =

Hill in the Czech Republic

Coordinates: 50°05′58″N 14°25′15″E

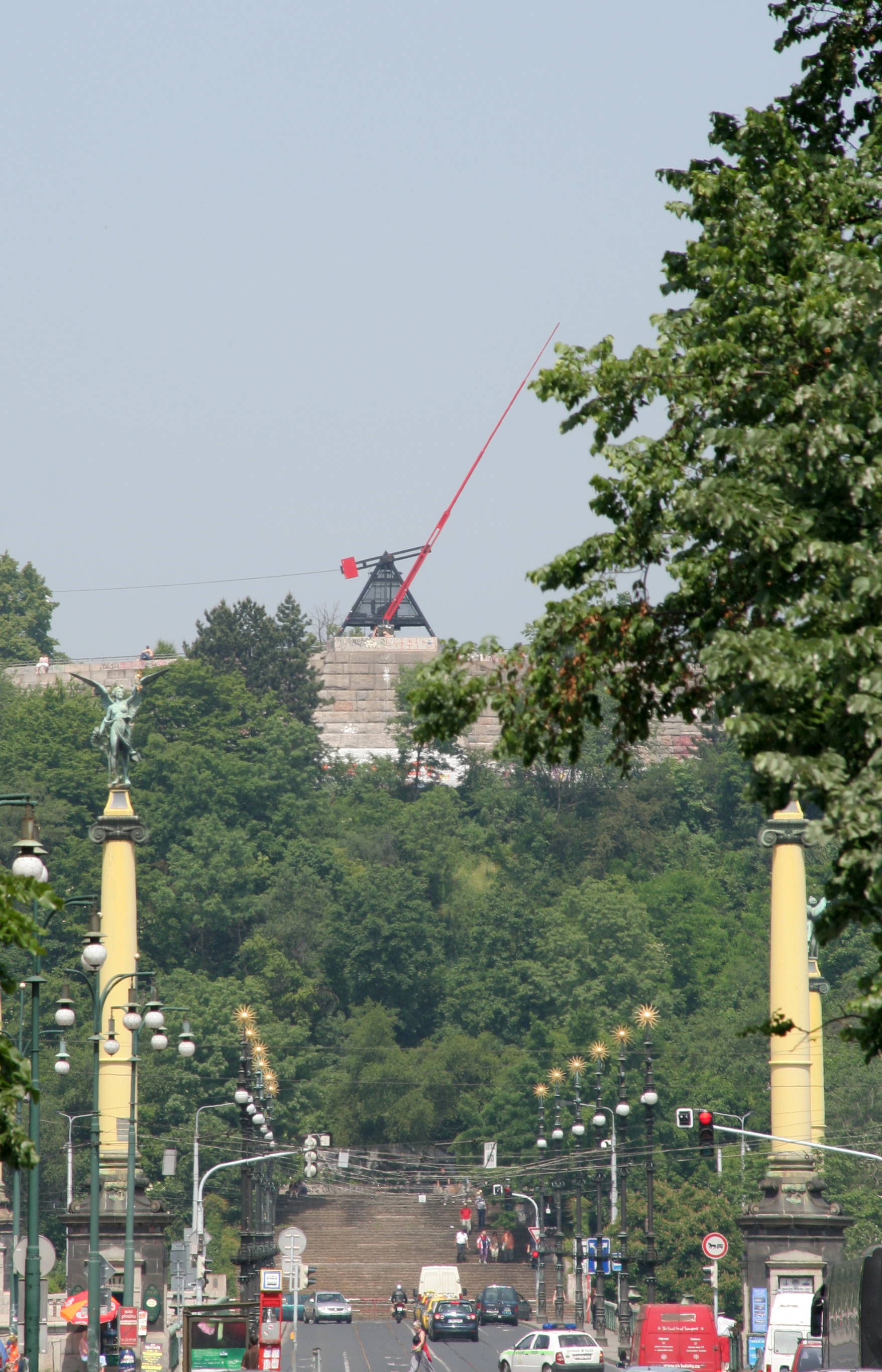
Prague Metronome on the Letná Park

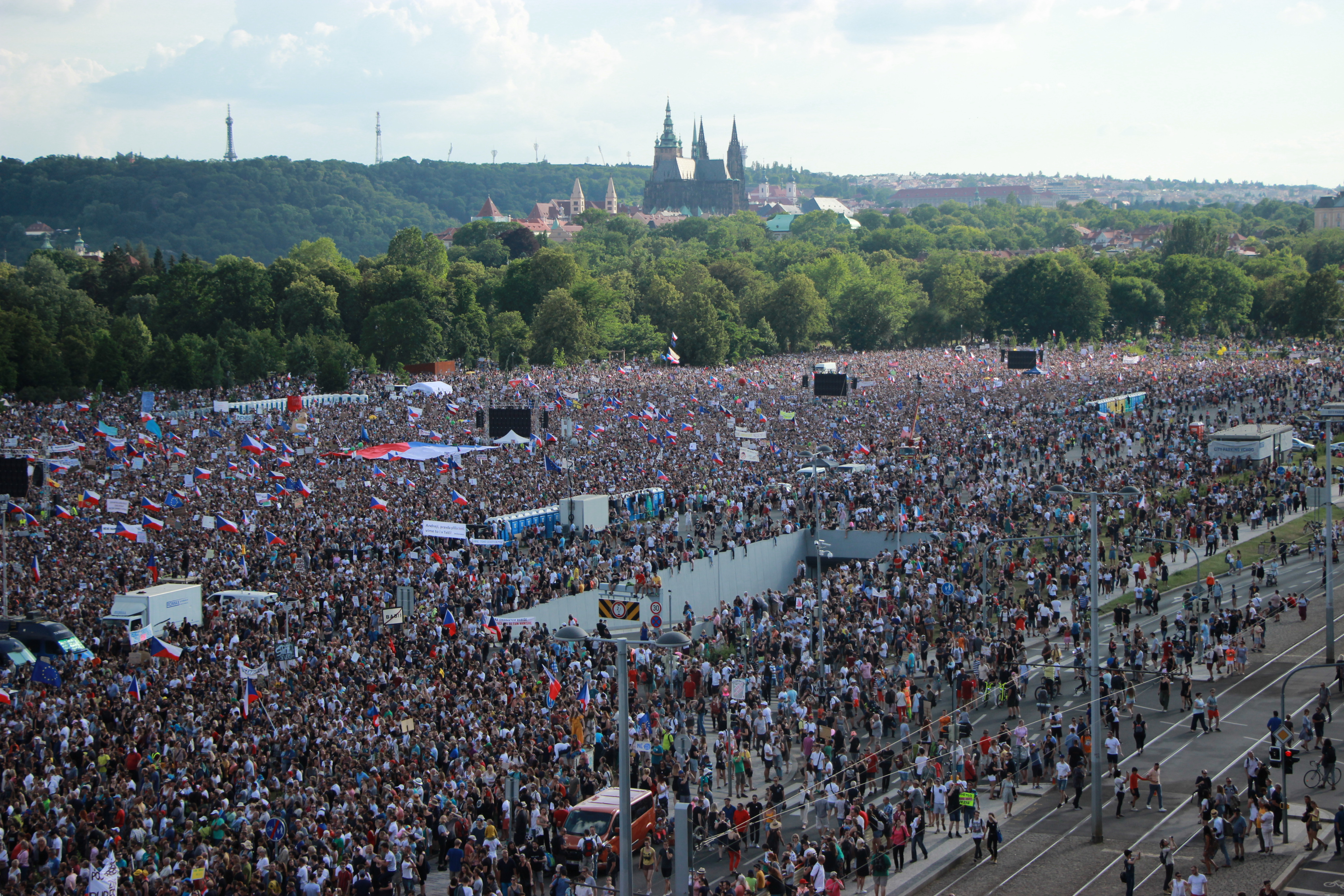
Letna Plain.

Letná is a hill and neighbourhood in Prague, Czech Republic, overlooking the Vltava and the historic city centre. It lies in Prague 7, across parts of Bubeneč and Holešovice. The name is also commonly used for Letná Plain (Letenská pláň), a large open area adjoining Letná Park (Letenské sady).

Letná developed largely as a residential area from the late 19th century. Its prominent position above central Prague made the plain the subject of several major urban-planning proposals and later the site of the monumental Stalin Monument, now occupied by the Prague Metronome. Letná Plain has also served as one of Prague's principal spaces for mass gatherings, including demonstrations during the Velvet Revolution. Stadion Letná, the home ground of AC Sparta Prague, is located in the area.

== History ==
Letná developed rapidly in the late 19th century as Prague expanded north of the Vltava. Residential construction spread across the area from the 1890s, and during the interwar period Letná became increasingly residential in character. Letná Park, laid out along the southern edge of the hill, developed into one of Prague's major public parks in the late 19th century.

In 1891, during the General Land Centennial Exhibition, František Křižík opened the first electric railway in the Czech lands at Letná. The line began near the present-day Letná Chateau and ran towards Stromovka.

After the establishment of Czechoslovakia in 1918, Letná Plain was repeatedly proposed as the site of a new parliament and government district. Several architectural competitions were held during the interwar period, but the plans were never realised.

The southern edge of Letná was later dominated by the monumental Stalin Monument, unveiled in 1955 and demolished in 1962 during de-Stalinization. The Prague Metronome was installed on its former pedestal in 1991.

== Public gatherings and events ==
Letná Plain has been the site of some of the largest public gatherings in modern Czech history. During the Velvet Revolution, mass demonstrations were held there on 25 and 26 November 1989. An estimated 800,000 people attended the first gathering, where representatives of the opposition Civic Forum and the communist government addressed the crowd.

The plain since became a major venue for political demonstrations. On 23 June 2019, around 250,000 people, according to organisers, gathered there to call for the resignation of Prime Minister Andrej Babiš. The protest was described as the country's largest since the Velvet Revolution. Another large anti-government demonstration was held at Letná in March 2026.

Letná has also hosted major concerts. Michael Jackson opened his HIStory World Tour there in September 1996 before an audience of about 120,000. The Rolling Stones performed on the plain in July 2003 before an estimated 80,000 people.
