= Molochov =

- Molochov
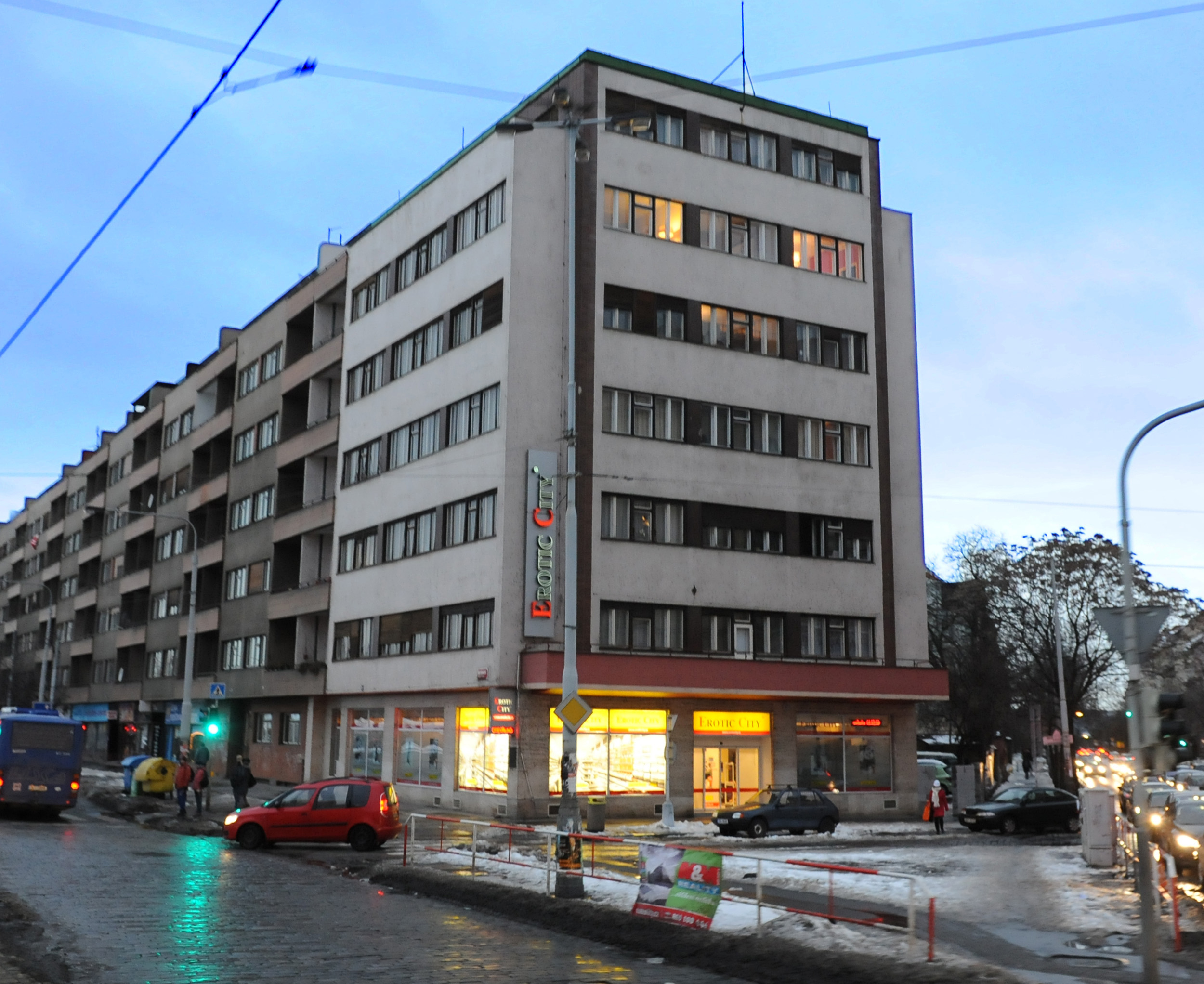
- Molochov in 2010
- Interactive map of the Molochov area

General information
- Location: Prague, Czech Republic
- Coordinates: 50.0994°N 14.4189°E
- Completed: 1938

In Prague, Molochov is the popular name of the functionalist building completed in 1938 whose long façade faces Letná Park's north side. Il holds its name from Moloch due to the "colossal" dimensions of its façade, 252 m long and 16,5 m high. It is located on Milada Horáková street. The complex is composed of fourteen building units joined by a single façade.

It was built between 1936 and 1938, by the architects Josef Havlíček (designer of the façade unifying the different building units), Ernst Mühlstein, Victor Furth, František Votava, Leo Lauermann and the brothers Otto and Karel Kohn (designers of seven out of the fourteen units). The Kohn brothers fled Nazi occupied Czechoslovakia in 1938 and could not finish their part of the work which was therefore taken over by Havlíček.

Since 1964, it is protected as a historical monument.
