= Letná Park =

Park in Prague, Czech Republic

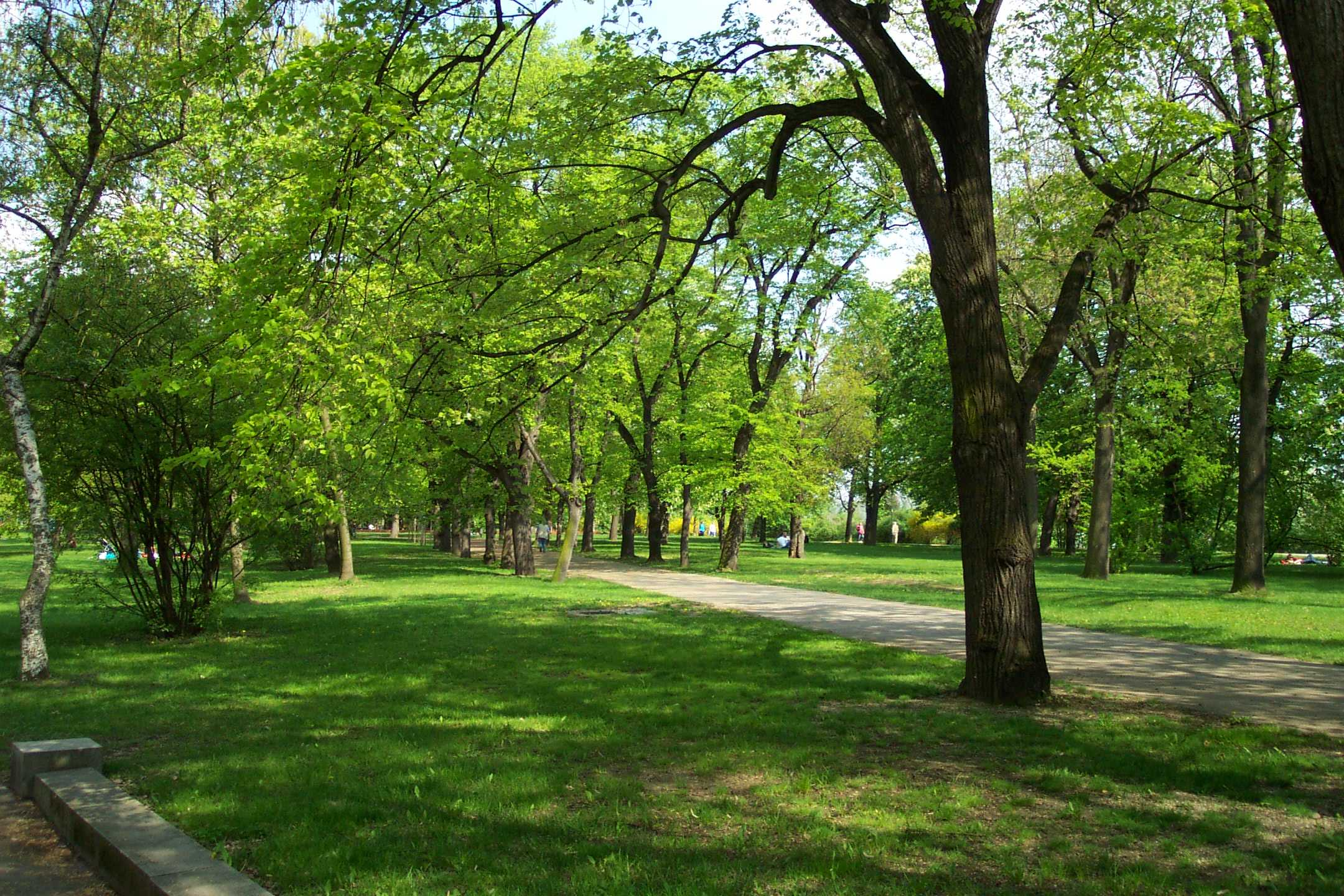
- Interactive map of Letná Park
- Location: Prague, Czech Republic
- Coordinates: 50°5′37.45″N 14°24′45.12″E

Letná Park (Czech: Letenské sady) is a park in Prague, Czech Republic. It is located on Letná hill, on a plateau above steep embankments along the Vltava River. Letná's elevation and location afford commanding views of the Prague Old Town (Staré Město).

"Leten", originally called "summer camp" or "place to sunbathe", gained its importance in the Middle Ages, when the first military camps were located there due to their strategic location. The areas were mainly vineyards and gardens. It was not until the end of the 19th century that it began to be systematically colonized. Over time, the plains of this area of the city became a place of meeting, entertainment and recreation.

In 1955, a large monument to Joseph Stalin was erected at the edge of Letná Park. This statue was destroyed in 1962 and the Prague Metronome now occupies the site.

In the "Normalisation" period after the Warsaw Pact troops invasion of 1968, the park was the location for the founding event of the Czech Women's Automobile Club. In January 1969 a group of women driving instructors and motoring journalists put on a public skills test for women drivers, which led to the formation of the club. The club is still active.

During the Velvet Revolution, a plain next to the Letná Park (Letná Plain) was the site of some important demonstrations against the Communist government. On the 25th and 26 November 1989, approximately 750,000 people protested in here.

Singer Michael Jackson kicked off his HIStory World Tour at the park on 7 September 1996; approximately 130,000 people attended the concert.

On 23 June 2019, more than 250,000 people gathered on the Letná plain, calling on Prime Minister Andrej Babiš to resign amid allegations of conflict of interest and criminal fraud.

Nowadays the Letná Park is conceived more as an area of recreation, leisure and outdoor sports practice. The area around the metronome is a popular skateboarding location.

== Buildings, monuments and attractions ==
Hanavský Pavilion is a cast-iron structure built in 1891 in Neo-Baroque style for the Jubilee World Fair (General Land Centennial Exhibition).

One of the oldest carousels in Europe, constructed in 1892, is located in Letná Park. The carousel has been reconstructed and after 16 years reopened in July 2022.

A large marble pedestal with Metronome which used to be the base of a large statue of Stalin, and is still referred to as Stalin's Monument.

The northern part of the park is delimited by AC Sparta Prague's stadium and Molochov's functionalist façade.

== Gallery ==
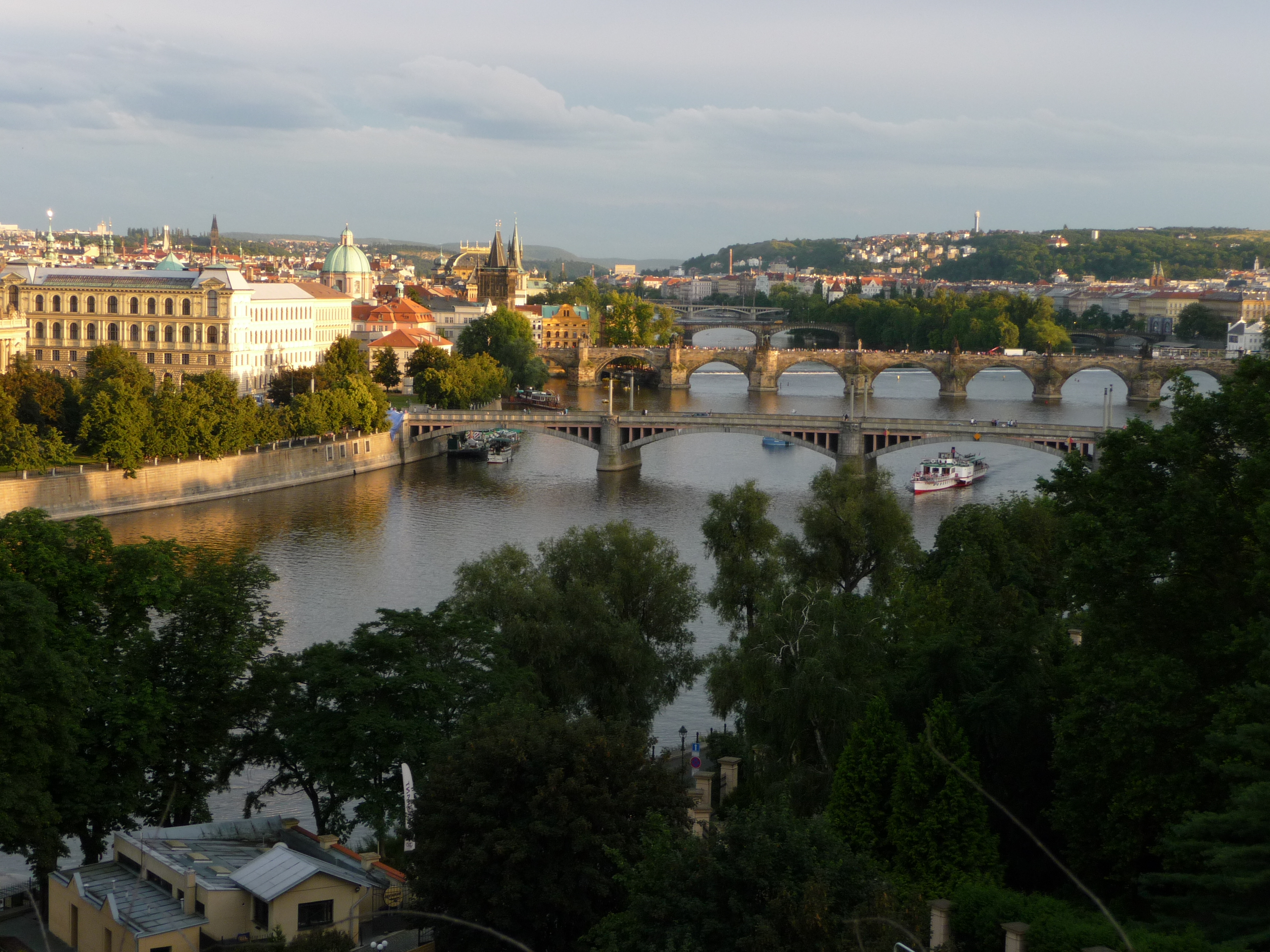
Famous postcard view towards bridges in Downtown Prague

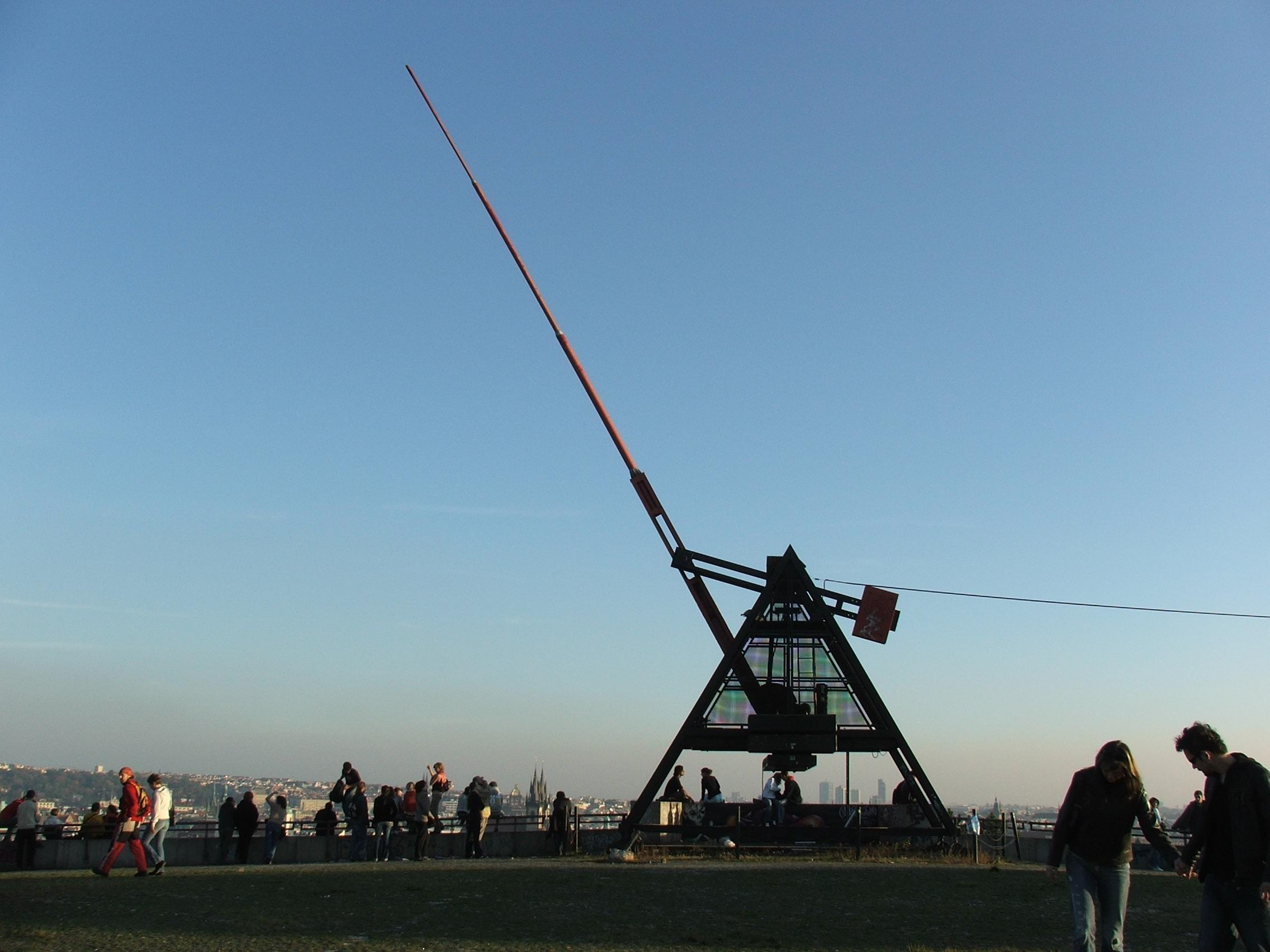
Metronom

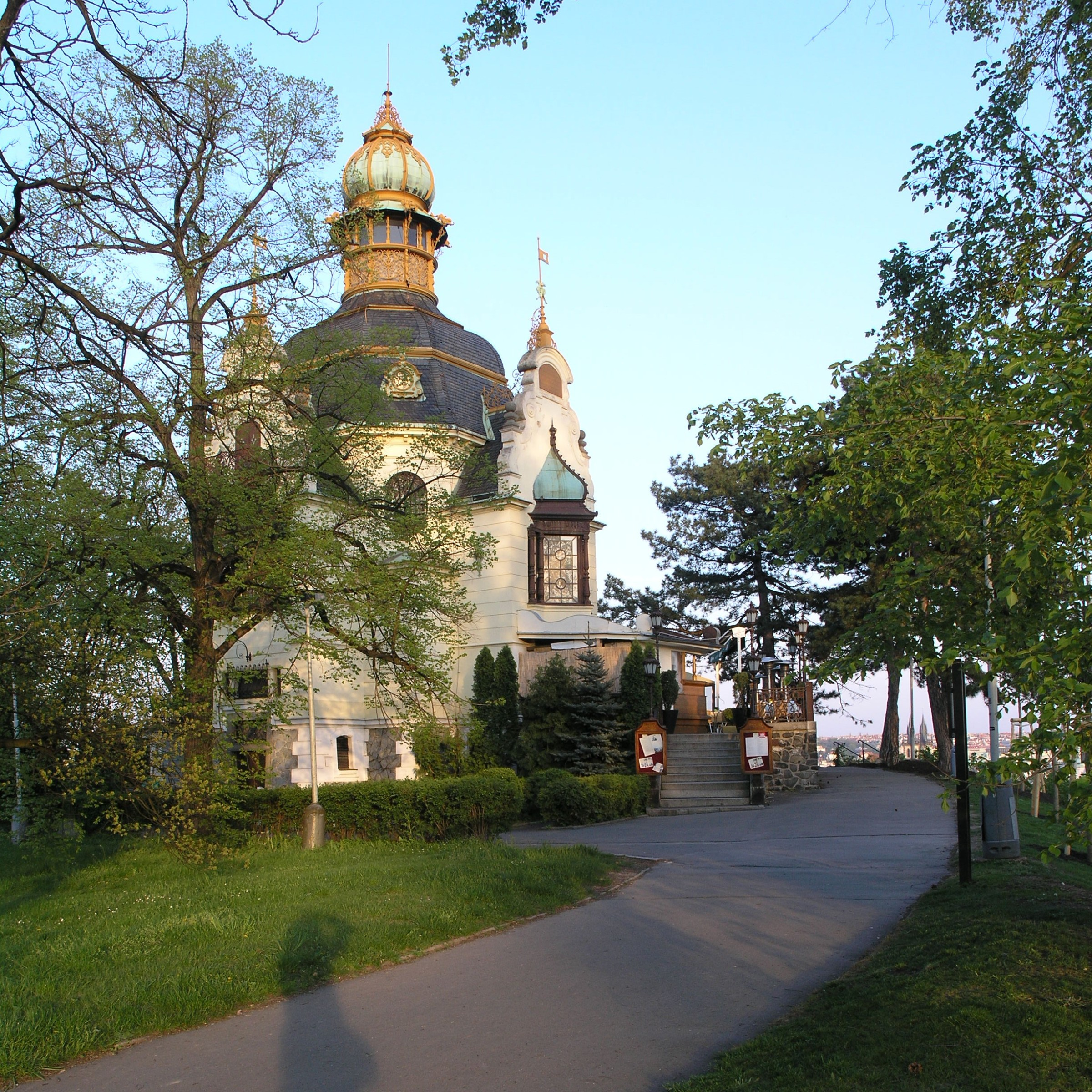
Hanavský Pavilion

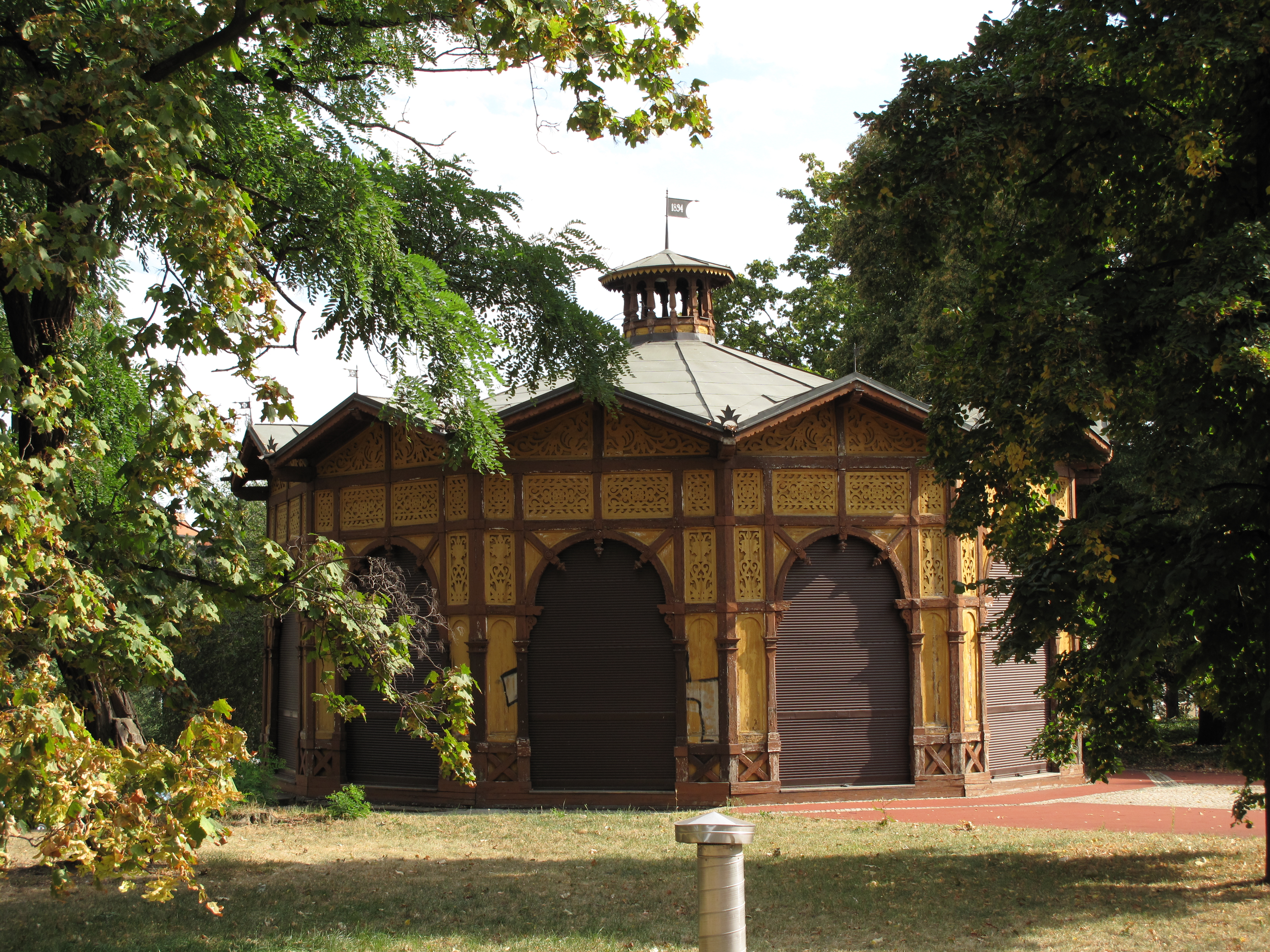
Letná Carousel

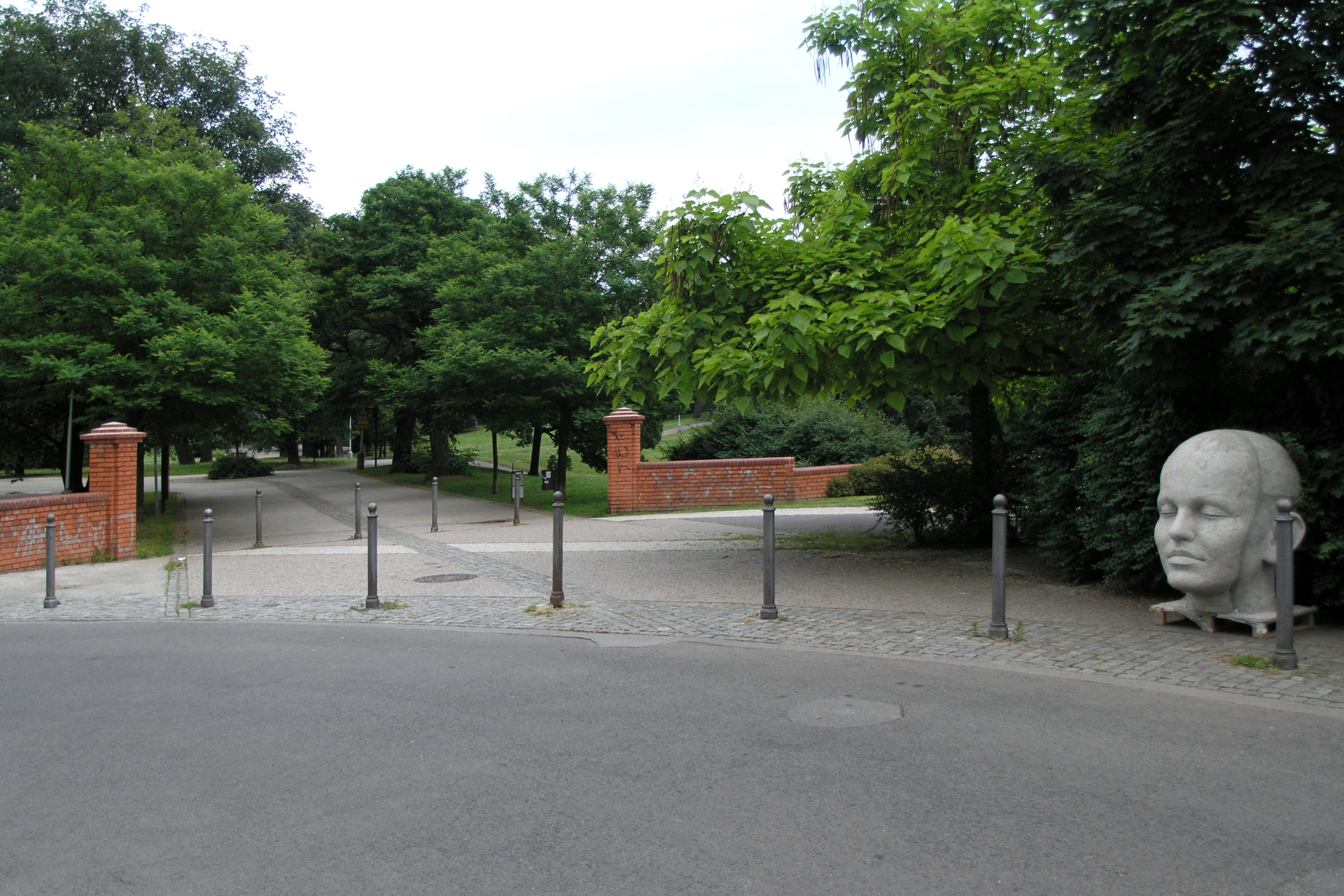
Gogolova street

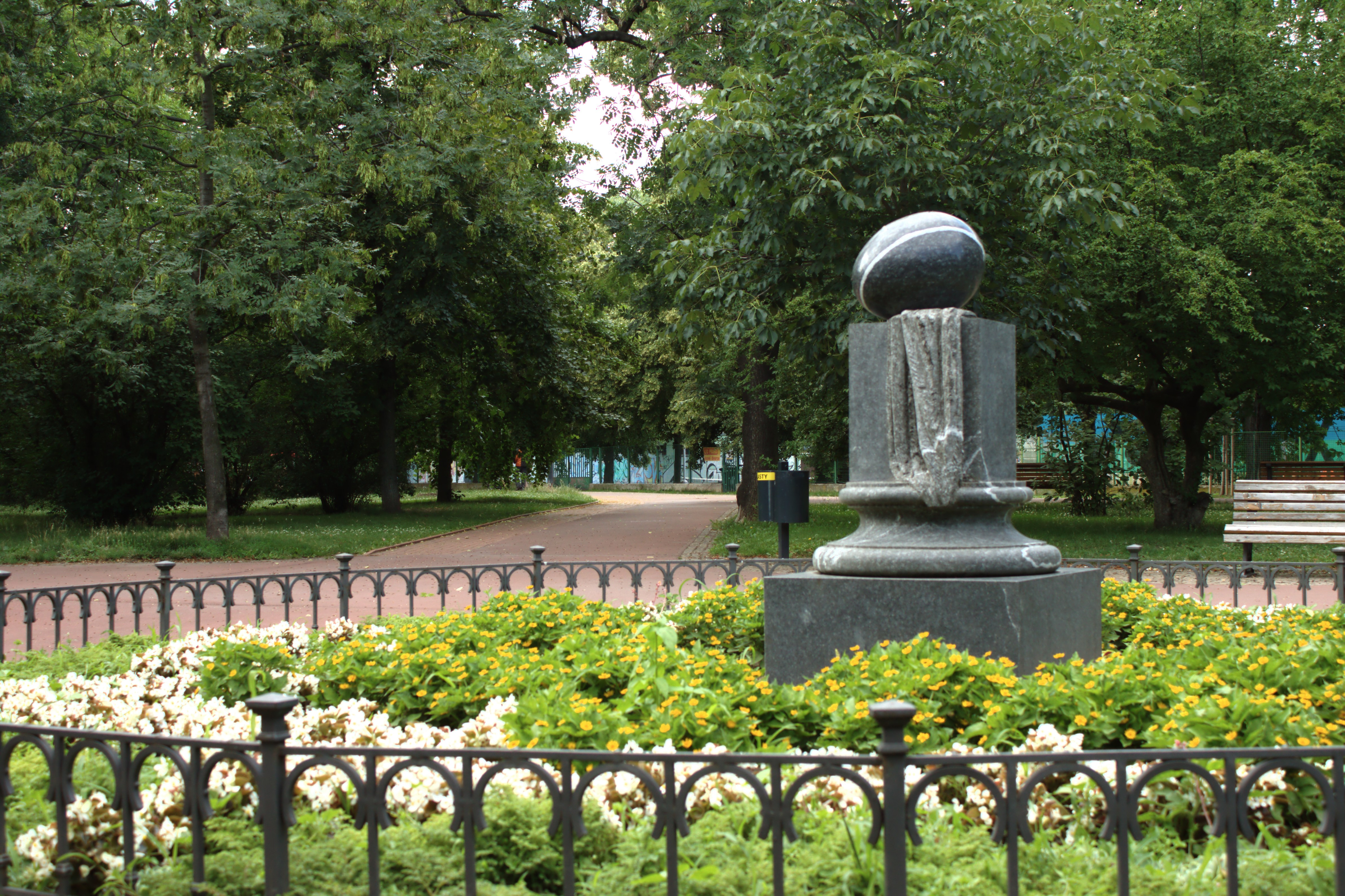
Statue of pebble
