= Victor Fürth =

Czech architect

Victor Fürth (16 February 1893 – 23 August 1984), was a Czech-Jewish architect working in Prague until 1939.

== Life ==
Fürth was born in Horažďovice, Bohemia, Austria-Hungary on 16 February 1893. His firm designed the Te-Ta department Store in Prague. This 7-story building can be seen at Jungmannova Street 747/28 in the New Town quarter of Prague.

Between 1928 and 1930 he and Ernst Mühlstein (1893–1968) designed the Villa Schück in Prague. He also joined with Ernst Mühlstein in the design of the large apartment complex in Prague called Molochov on Milady Horákové Street 74 in the years 1936–1938.

When the Nazi regime came to power in Czechoslovakia, he had to leave and fled to the United States through Great Britain. In Oxford, Ohio Victor Furth joined the faculty at Miami University as a Professor of Architecture. Among his designs were the Bern Street Apartments having large bedrooms and hardwood floors and numerous houses for Miami faculty, often employing a cathedral ceiling. He died on 23 August 1984 in Oxford, Ohio. Throughout his teaching career Furth was denied tenure and instead had been on an annually renewed contract; however, in September 2006, he was posthumously granted the title of Professor Emeritus by Miami University.

Fürth & Mühlstein (Czechoslovakia)

- 1923–1924 Residence, Českomalinská 41, Prague
- 1927 Residence for Dr Engel, Prague-Podolí
- 1928 Residence for Alexandr Schück, Nad Kázankou 39, Prague-Troja
- 1928 Residence for G Barth, Prague-Bubeneč
- 1928 Residence for Dr L Winter, Prague-Bubeneč
- 1932 Residence, Česká Kamenice
- 1933 Te-Ta (Teweles-Taussig) Department Store, Jungmannova 28, Prague
- 1935–1937 Apartments, Soukenická 27–29, Prague
- 1937–1939 Apartments, Masarykovo nábřeží 1, Prague
