= Prague Metronome =

Large functioning metronome in Czechia

- Pražský metronom (Czech)
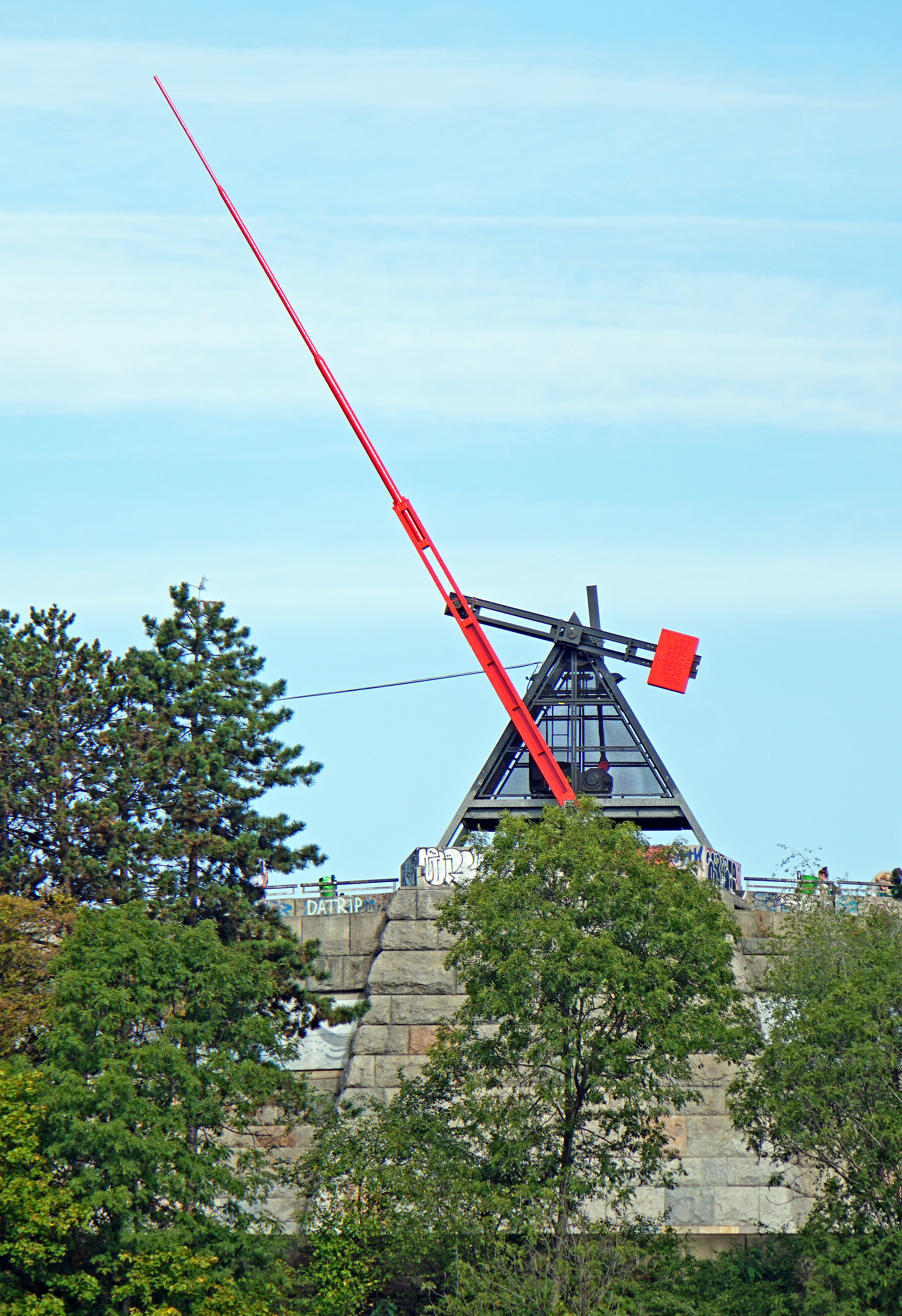
- The Metronome

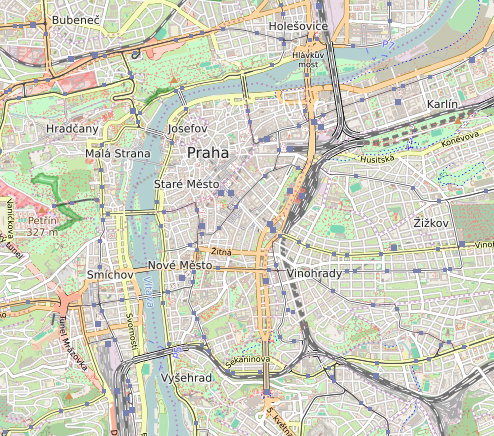
- Location in Prague
- Artist: Vratislav Novák
- Year: 1991
- Location: Prague 7, Czech Republic; 50°05′41″N 14°24′56″E
- Website: www.prague.eu/en/object/places/3003/metronome

The Prague Metronome (Czech: Pražský metronom), titled Stroj času ("Time Machine"), is a kinetic sculpture by Czech sculptor Vratislav Karel Novák installed in 1991 in Letná Park, Prague. The nearly 25-metre-high (82 ft) steel structure stands on the pedestal of the former Stalin Monument, which was demolished in 1962.

The sculpture was created for the 1991 General Czechoslovak Exhibition and was originally intended as a temporary installation.

== History ==
The site was occupied from 1955 to 1962 by a large monument to Soviet leader Joseph Stalin. After the monument was demolished, its stone pedestal remained overlooking the Vltava and central Prague.

Novák's Stroj času was commissioned for the General Czechoslovak Exhibition of 1991, held a century after Prague's Jubilee Exhibition of 1891. Because of concerns about the condition of the former Stalin monument's pedestal, the structure was lifted into position by helicopter rather than installed using heavy equipment on the site. It was first set in motion on 15 May 1991.

Although intended to be temporary, the metronome remained after the exhibition. It has since been used for several public displays. Before the 2003 Czech European Union membership referendum, its pendulum moved between signs reading NE ("No") and ANO ("Yes"). In 2009, it was illuminated in European Union colours to mark the Czech Republic's first Presidency of the Council of the European Union.

The metronome returned to operation in August 2025 after more than two years of renovation.

== Site ==
The terrace around the metronome overlooks the Vltava, Old Town and central Prague. It has also become a well-known meeting place and skateboarding location.

An open-air cultural centre, Stalin Letná, operates beneath the metronome and hosts concerts, film screenings, and electronic music events.
