= Stalin Monument (Prague) =

Sculpture in Prague, Czech Republic

- Stalinův pomník (Czech)
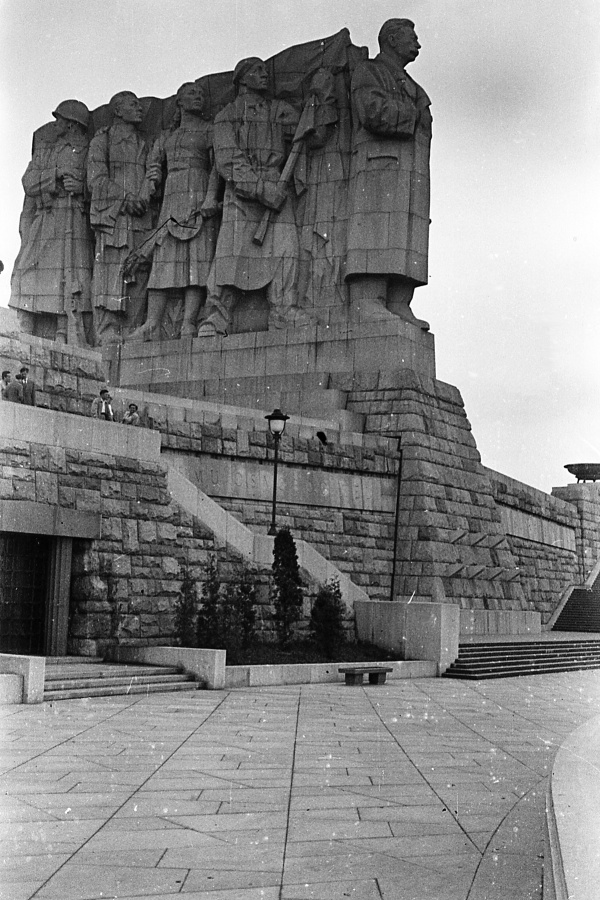
- The Stalin Monument and pedestal, viewed from the west
- Artist: Otakar Švec
- Completion date: May 1, 1955
- Type: Sculpture
- Medium: granite
- Subject: Joseph Stalin
- Condition: Demolished November 6, 1962
- Location: Prague, Czech Republic; 50°05′41.38″N 14°24′57.97″E

Stalin's Monument (Czech: Stalinův pomník) was a 15.5 m (51 ft) granite statue honoring Joseph Stalin in Prague, Czechoslovakia. It was unveiled on 1 May 1955 after more than 5 1/2 years of work, and was the world's largest representation of Stalin. The sculpture was demolished in late 1962.

== History ==
=== Background ===
The structure was commissioned after the Communist Party of Czechoslovakia seized power in Czechoslovakia in 1948 with Soviet backing. It was designed to showcase Stalinist ideology and was constructed on an elevated site on Letna Hill in Letná Park, overlooking the city centre of Prague.

=== Construction and inauguration ===
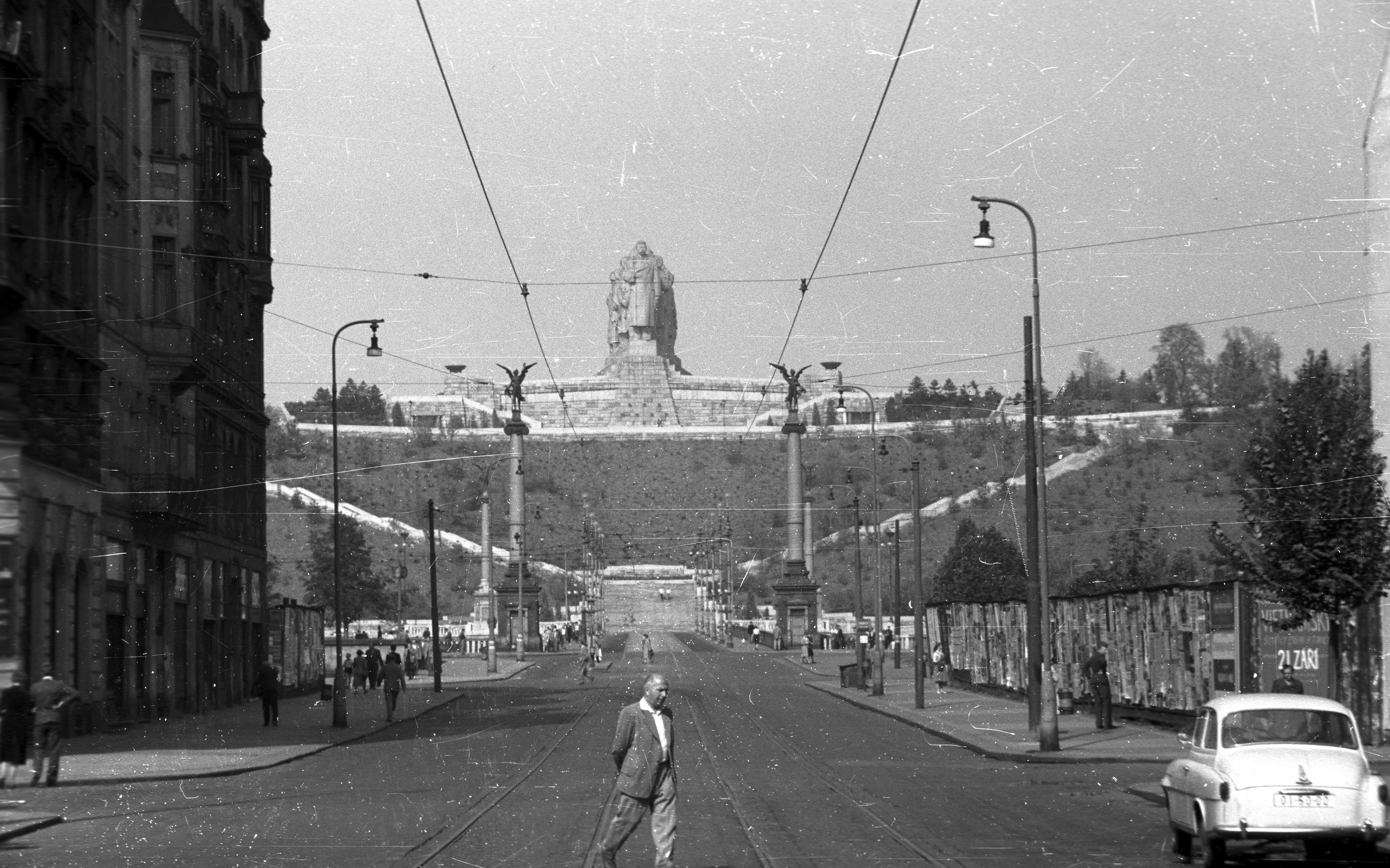
The monument overlooking Prague city centre

The monument was located on a huge concrete pedestal on the flattened Letna Hill, which can still be visited in Letná Park. It was the largest group statue in Europe, measuring 15.5 m (51 ft) high and 22 m (72 ft) long. The monument weighed 17 million kilograms, and consumed thirty thousand granite slabs.

Forced labour was used during the monument's construction. In 2021, archaeological excavations in Letná Park uncovered the foundations of a labour camp which housed workers involved in the monument's construction. According to historical documents, the camp consisted of three wooden barracks, each accommodating up to 40 inmates in eight-person rooms, with minimal facilities. The laborers were described as soldiers and individuals deemed politically unreliable by the communist regime.

The monument was unveiled on May 1, 1955. Officially titled "A Monument to Love and Friendship", the sculptor, Otakar Švec, had killed himself a few days earlier.

=== Demolition ===
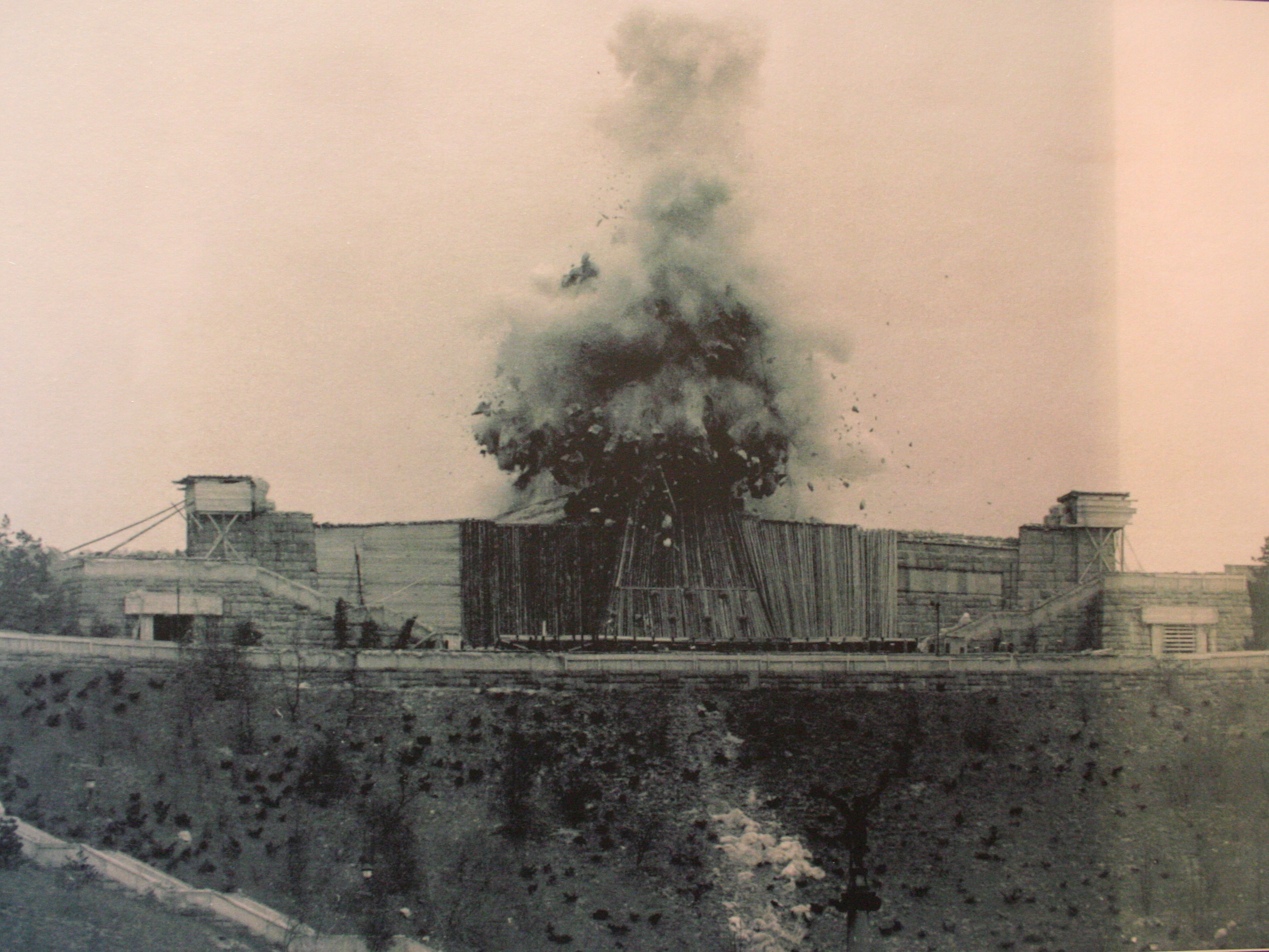
Removal of the monument

Appearing two years after the death of Joseph Stalin, the monument's unveiling occurred as the process of de-Stalinization was beginning. Subsequently viewed as a liability, Moscow ordered the monument's demolition in 1962. Debris from the demolition is stored in chambers beneath the site.

== Later use of site ==
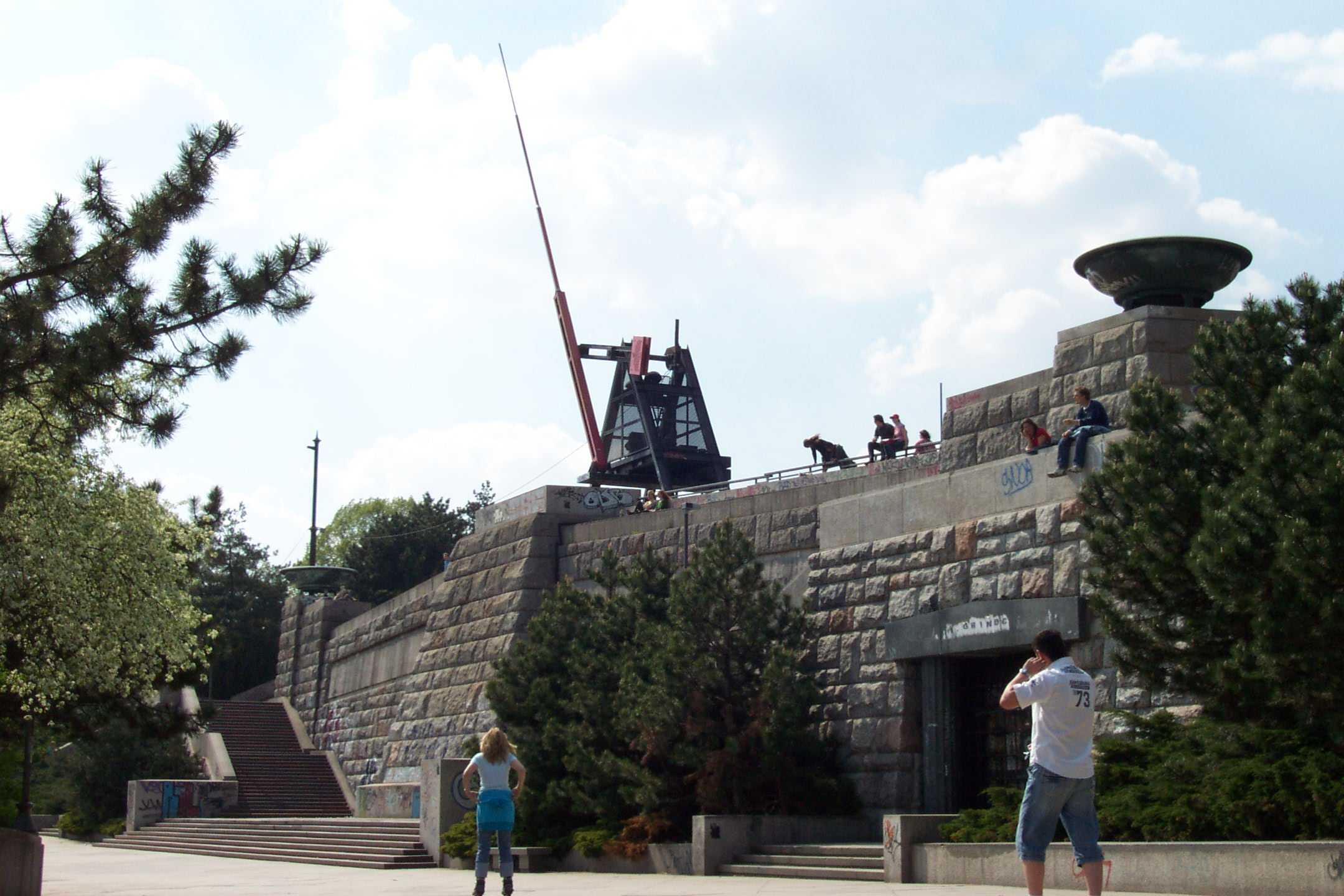
Metronome, a view from the East

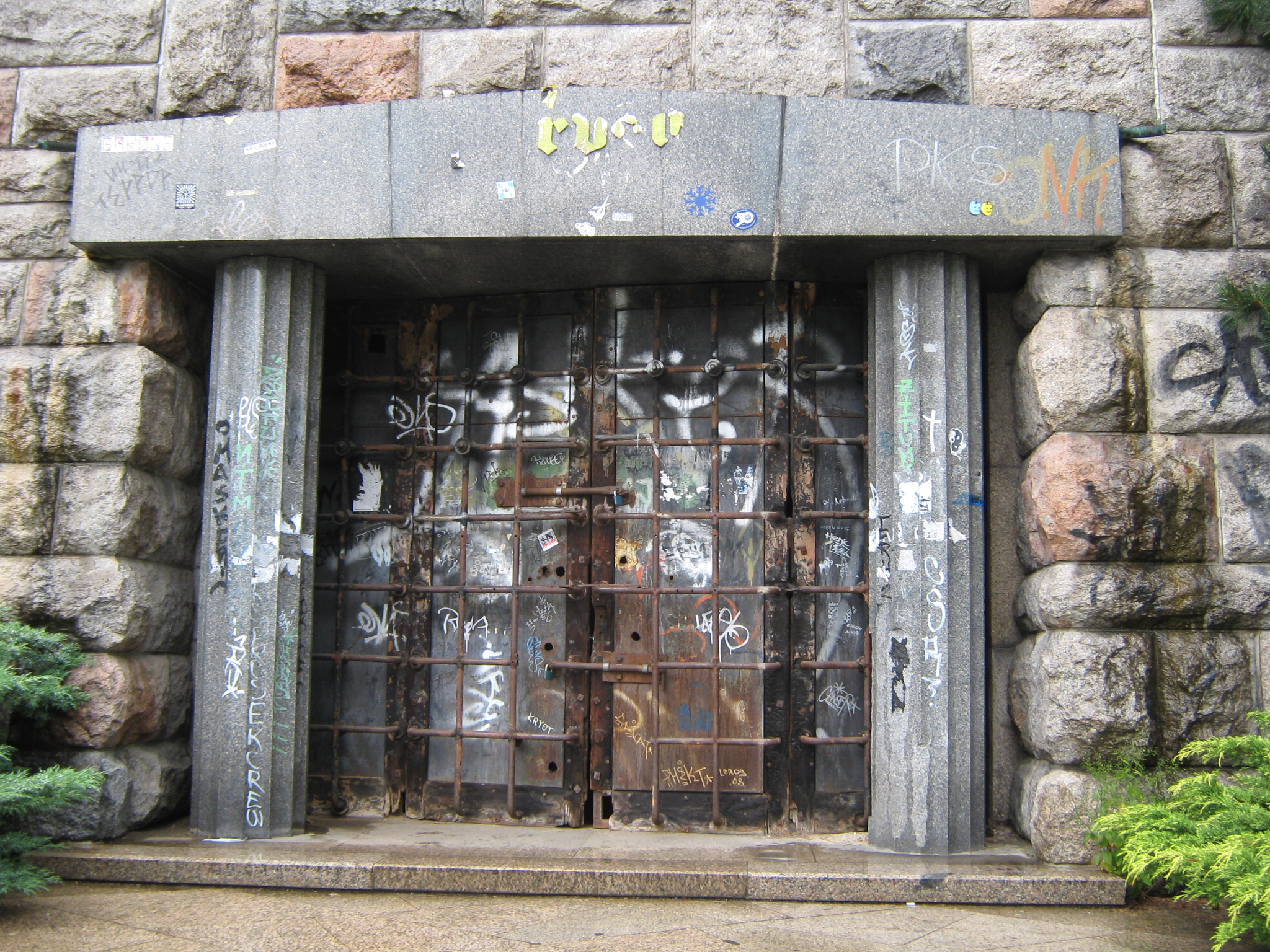
Gates to nowhere

In 1990, pirate radio station Radio Stalin operated from a bomb shelter beneath the statue's plinth. The same shelter was also the home of Prague's first rock club in the early 1990s. Since 1991, the marble pedestal has been used as the base of a giant kinetic sculpture of a metronome. In 1996, the pedestal was briefly used as a base for a 35-foot-tall (11 m) statue of Michael Jackson as a promotional stunt for the start of his HIStory World Tour. A billboard promoting Civic Democratic Party leader Václav Klaus was erected on the site during the Czech parliamentary elections of 1998 but was removed soon after due to high winds.

A green plaque below the metronome reads:

Metronome
Letenské sady
The Metronome, the work of sculptor Vratislav Karel Novák, was erected in 1991 atop the massive stone plinth that originally served as the base for the monument to Soviet leader Josef Vissarionovich Stalin. Work began on Prague's Stalin monument towards the end of 1949, and in May 1955, it was finally unveiled. The largest group sculpture in Europe during its existence, the monument had a reinforced-concrete structure faced with 235 granite blocks, weighing 17,000 tonnes and costing 140 million crowns to complete. The gigantic composition, by sculptor Otakar Švec and the architects Jiří and Vlasta [his wife] Štursa, did not tower for long over the medieval centre of Prague: in connection with Soviet criticism of Stalin's "cult of personality," the work was dynamited and removed towards the end of 1962.

The City of Prague has been considering several options for redevelopment of the site for years, including a plan to build an aquarium. The remaining socle is a popular meeting point for skateboarders and other people.

== See also ==
- Stalin Monument (Budapest)
- Socialist realism
- List of tallest statues
