= Dominik Hašek =

Czech ice hockey player (born 1965)

- Hockey Hall of Fame, 2014
- Hašek in 2026
- Born: 29 January 1965 (age 61) Pardubice, Czechoslovakia
- Height: 6 ft 1 in (185 cm)
- Weight: 166 lb (75 kg; 11 st 12 lb)
- Position: Goaltender
- Caught: Left
- Played for: HC Pardubice; Dukla Jihlava; Chicago Blackhawks; Buffalo Sabres; Detroit Red Wings; Ottawa Senators; Spartak Moscow
- NHL draft: 199th overall, 1983; Chicago Black Hawks
- Playing career: 1980–2011
Medal record
Men's ice hockey
Representing the Czech Republic
Winter Olympics
Gold medal – first place	1998 Nagano
Bronze medal – third place	2006 Turin
Representing Czechoslovakia
World Championships
Silver medal – second place	1983 West Germany
Bronze medal – third place	1987 Vienna
Bronze medal – third place	1989 Stockholm
Bronze medal – third place	1990 Berne / Fribourg
World Junior Championships
Silver medal – second place	1982 Minnesota
Silver medal – second place	1983 Leningrad
Silver medal – second place	1985 Helsinki/Turku

Dominik Hašek (Czech: [ˈdomɪnɪk ˈɦaʃɛk], audio; born 29 January 1965) is a Czech former professional ice hockey player who was a goaltender for 16 seasons in the National Hockey League (NHL), mostly for the Buffalo Sabres. Widely considered to be among the greatest goaltenders in history, Hašek also played for the Chicago Blackhawks, Detroit Red Wings, and Ottawa Senators in his NHL career before finishing his career in Europe. While in Buffalo, he became one of the league's finest goaltenders, earning him the nickname "the Dominator". His strong play has been credited with establishing European goaltenders in a league previously dominated by North Americans. He is a two-time Stanley Cup champion, both with the Red Wings, winning his first as the starting goaltender in his first season with the team in 2002, and his second in 2008 as the team's backup in his last NHL season.

Hašek was one of the league's most successful goaltenders of the 1990s and early 2000s. From 1993 to 2001, he won six Vezina Trophies, the most under the award's current system of voting for the best individual goaltender. In 1998 he won his second consecutive Hart Memorial Trophy, the only goaltender to win that award more than once. During the 1998 Winter Olympics in Nagano, Japan, he led the Czech national ice hockey team to its first and only Olympic gold medal. The feat made him a popular figure in his home country and prompted hockey legend Wayne Gretzky to call him "the best player in the game". While with the Red Wings in 2002, Hašek became the first European-trained starting goaltender to win the Stanley Cup. In the process, he set a record for shutouts in a postseason year.

Hašek was considered an unorthodox goaltender, with a distinct style that led to his being labeled as a "flopper". He was best known for his concentration, foot speed, flexibility, and unconventional saves, such as covering the puck with his blocker rather than his trapper. Hašek holds the record for highest NHL career save percentage (0.9223) and is seventh (first in the modern era) in goals against average (2.202). He also has the third-highest NHL single-season save percentage (0.9366 in 1998–99), behind Tim Thomas in 2010–11 and Brian Elliott's 0.940 in 2011–12. Hašek is the only goalie to face the most shots per 60 minutes and have the highest save percentage in the same season, which he achieved twice (1996 and 1998) playing for the Sabres.

At the time of his retirement, he was the oldest active goaltender in the NHL at 43, and the second-oldest active player in the league after Red Wings teammate Chris Chelios, who was 46. Hašek announced his retirement on 9 June 2008, but on 21 April 2009, he announced a comeback to professional ice hockey and signed a contract with HC Pardubice of the Czech Extraliga. On 7 June 2010, he signed with Spartak Moscow of the Kontinental Hockey League (KHL) and played the last season of his career with this team. Hašek announced his second retirement on 9 October 2012. Hašek was inducted into the Hockey Hall of Fame on 17 November 2014. He is also a member of the Czech Ice Hockey Hall of Fame and the IIHF Hall of Fame. His number was retired by the Buffalo Sabres (2015) and HC Pardubice (2013). In 2017, he was named one of the '100 Greatest NHL Players' in history.

== Early life ==
Hašek was born Dominik Kaštánek to Alois and Marie. When he was two his parents divorced, and Marie later married Jan Hašek, who adopted Hašek. Hašek started playing hockey at the age of six in his native Czechoslovakia. As he explains:

They held a tryout for 5-year-old boys and my father took me there. I didn't even have real skates. I had those blades that you screwed onto the soles of your shoes, but I was tall, and the 9-year-olds didn't have a goalie, so they put me in with them and that's where I fell in love with the game of hockey.

In 1980, Hašek joined the top hockey league in the country, the Czechoslovak First Ice Hockey League, with his hometown team, HC Pardubice. He became the youngest hockey player in history to play at the professional level at age 16. He helped to win two league titles in 1987 and 1989. The next year, he was conscripted in the Czechoslovak Army and played for an army team Dukla Jihlava. After making his mark and eventually playing for the Czechoslovak national team, Hašek entered the NHL draft and was drafted by the Chicago Blackhawks in 1983. At the time, NHL teams were wary of drafting players from behind the Iron Curtain who were often barred from playing in NHL by their countries. Consequently, Hašek was picked in the 10th round (199th overall) and was the 17th goaltender selected. Hašek did not even know he had been drafted until several months later.

Hašek played on the Czechoslovakia team in the 1988 Winter Olympics, featuring in games against Finland and Canada as the team finished sixth overall.

Until 1990, Hašek played in his native Czechoslovakia for HC Pardubice and Dukla Jihlava. He won the Golden Hockey Stick, given to the most valuable player in the Czechoslovak top league, in 1987, 1989 and 1990. He was named the league's Goaltender of the Year for five consecutive years from 1986 through 1990. His American career began with the Indianapolis Ice of the International Hockey League (IHL), where he played parts of two seasons. His NHL debut with the Blackhawks finally came in the 1990–91 season, seven years after the 1983 NHL entry draft.

== NHL career ==
=== Chicago Blackhawks (1990–1992) ===
In Chicago, Hašek spent time as the backup to Ed Belfour. Belfour was a 25-year-old rookie but he would shine immediately, winning the Vezina Trophy, Jennings Trophy, and Calder Trophy after the conclusion of the 1990–91 season, Hašek played only 25 games over two seasons with the Blackhawks, splitting time between the Blackhawks and the Indianapolis Ice of the IHL. On 6 November 1990, wearing the number 34 (31 was worn by backup goaltender Jacques Cloutier that year), Hašek made his first NHL start in a 1–1 tie against the Hartford Whalers. His first victory came on 8 March 1991, by a score of 5–3 over the Buffalo Sabres, and on 9 January 1992, he recorded his first shutout in a 2–0 win against the Toronto Maple Leafs.

During his time in Chicago, the Blackhawks goaltending coach was Vladislav Tretiak, who was selected in the 1983 entry draft but was barred from playing in the NHL by the Soviet government.

Hašek made his first NHL playoff appearance, which was in game four of the 1992 Stanley Cup Final against Mario Lemieux's Pittsburgh Penguins, after Belfour allowed two goals on four shots in the opening 6:33. Hašek played well with 21 saves despite the loss. Although the Penguins won and clinched the Stanley Cup, Hašek's performance attracted the attention of the Sabres, who had considered trading for him earlier that season.

=== Buffalo Sabres (1992–2001) ===
After the Stanley Cup Final appearance, Chicago decided to stay with Belfour and Jimmy Waite, and traded Hašek to the Buffalo Sabres on August 7, 1992, for goaltender Stéphane Beauregard and future considerations, which later materialized into a draft pick used to obtain Éric Dazé. In Buffalo, wearing number 39, he was initially the backup goaltender, playing behind Grant Fuhr. When Fuhr was injured partway through the 1993–94 season, Hašek was elevated to starter and soon developed into a top-tier goaltender. In 1994, he won his first Vezina Trophy, was runner-up for the Hart Memorial Trophy and shared the William M. Jennings Trophy with Fuhr. Hašek played 58 games with a league-best 1.95 goals against average (GAA), seven shutouts, and a .930 save percentage. He followed this feat by again winning the Vezina Trophy and again placing as a Hart finalist in 1994–95.

Hašek's success in the 1996–97 season was overshadowed by a conflict with then-head coach Ted Nolan. The conflict created a tense, clique-like atmosphere in the Sabres' clubhouse. In game three of the Sabres' best-of-seven first-round playoff series against the Ottawa Senators, Hašek removed himself in the second period and was replaced by Steve Shields. Hašek suffered a mild sprain of his right MCL, and the team doctor pronounced him day-to-day. However, the media and some teammates speculated Hašek was using his injury to bail out on the team. One such individual was Buffalo News columnist Jim Kelley, who wrote a column detailing Hašek's injury and his conflict with Nolan, and questioning the goaltender's mental toughness. When Kelley approached Hašek for an interview after a loss in game five, Hašek physically attacked the journalist and received a three-game suspension and a $10,000 (US) fine as a result of the incident. With Shields in goal, the Sabres fought back against the Senators and took the series in seven games. However, Hašek did not play in the following series against the Philadelphia Flyers, which Buffalo lost in five games.

Though general manager John Muckler was named Executive of the Year, he was fired for his constant feuding with Nolan. Hašek, who sided with Muckler, stated in an interview during the 1997 NHL Awards ceremony that the team would benefit from replacing Nolan. Although Nolan won the Jack Adams Award as the league's top coach and was popular with Sabres fans, new general manager Darcy Regier only offered him a one-year contract extension. Nolan rejected the offer on the grounds that it was too short and parted ways with the franchise. This upset many fans, who blamed Nolan's departure on Hašek's alleged attempt to get rid of him. For the first six weeks of the next season he was booed so vigorously that arena workers would play tapes of a crowd cheering to help balance it out. As the season progressed, the booing of Hašek ceased, as he posted a league-record seven shutouts in December and continued to play at an elite level. He won the Vezina Trophy again, as well as the Lester B. Pearson Award and the Hart Trophy as league MVP. He became one of the few goaltenders in NHL history to win the Hart, alongside Connor Hellebuyck, Jacques Plante, Carey Price, Chuck Rayner, Al Rollins, José Théodore and Roy Worters.

Hašek played a career-high 72 games in the 1997–98 season, and set a team record with 13 shutouts. Six of these shutouts came in December, which tied the all-time NHL record for most in one month. He again won the Lester B. Pearson Award, the Hart Trophy, and the Vezina Trophy, becoming the first goaltender in NHL history to win the Hart twice. He donated the $10,000 prize money after winning the Pearson Award in 1998 to the Variety Club of Buffalo. In the off-season he signed a three-year, $26 million deal, securing the highest goaltender salary contract at that time.

In 1998–99, Hašek averaged a career-best 1.87 GAA and .937 save percentage, capturing him his third consecutive Vezina, and fifth overall. He was also a finalist for the Hart and Pearson trophies, which were won by fellow Czech Jaromír Jágr. Though the Sabres did not have a stellar regular season and finished with the seventh seed in the Eastern Conference, they defeated the Ottawa Senators, Boston Bruins and Toronto Maple Leafs in the playoffs en route to a best-of-seven 1999 Stanley Cup Final against the Presidents' Trophy-winning Dallas Stars. The Sabres eventually lost the series four games to two, with the decisive sixth game being one of the longest Stanley Cup playoff games in NHL history. Hašek and the Stars' Ed Belfour (Hašek's former teammate in Chicago) made 50 and 53 saves, respectively, in a sudden-death triple-overtime duel that only ended when Stars forward Brett Hull (who would later be his teammate in Detroit, winning the Stanley Cup together in 2002) scored a controversial Cup-winning goal with his skate in the goal crease. The goal was not reviewed immediately, so officials did not notice Hull's skate in the crease until minutes later. After video reviews showed Hull's position, the goal was still upheld, leaving the Sabres infuriated. Hašek commented, "Maybe [the video goal judge] was in the bathroom. Maybe he was sleeping. Maybe he doesn't know the rule." The following season, NHL commissioner Gary Bettman announced that video replays would no longer be used to judge if players are in the crease or not, and that it would be a judgment call by the officiating crew. After the season ended, Hašek contemplated retirement because of a combination of injuries and a desire to become more involved in his family life. The announcement stunned many of his teammates, particularly Michael Peca and Jason Woolley.

In the 1999–2000 season, Hašek was hampered by a nagging groin injury. He missed forty games and failed to win a major NHL award for the first time in several years. Though he healed in time for the playoffs, the Sabres were eliminated in the first round in five games by the Flyers.

In 2000–01, his final season with Buffalo, Hašek set a modern era record by being awarded his sixth Vezina Trophy, and also won his second William M. Jennings Trophy. The Sabres played Philadelphia in the first round of the playoffs again, where Hašek outplayed his 1998 Olympic back-up Roman Čechmánek. In the first period of game one, Hašek saved Mark Recchi's penalty shot attempt. In the clinching sixth game, Hašek recorded a shutout against the Flyers in an 8–0 rout. In the second round, the Sabres played a seven-game series against the Penguins featuring Jaromír Jágr and Mario Lemieux (the latter who came back from retirement), which culminated with the Penguins winning the final game in overtime.

=== First tenure with the Detroit Red Wings (2001–2002; 2003–2004) ===
Before the start of the next season, Hašek was traded to the Detroit Red Wings on 30 June 2001, in an attempt to lower the Sabres' payroll and to send Hašek to a more competitive team. The Red Wings traded for him after the team decided to move on from starting goaltender (and future teammate) Chris Osgood, who was left unprotected in the NHL waiver draft and selected by the New York Islanders before the season began to make room for Hašek as the starter, as the team wanted to upgrade their goaltending after two consecutive losses in the second round of the playoffs in 1999 and 2000 against their archrivals, the Colorado Avalanche, and a first round upset loss in 2001 against the Los Angeles Kings. He was dealt for Vyacheslav Kozlov, a first-round selection in the 2002 NHL entry draft and future considerations, which eventually became the draft pick of Jim Slater. During his first season with Detroit, Hašek posted a career-high 41 wins with just 15 losses, helping the Red Wings earn the President's Trophy with the league's best record. In the playoffs, he led the Wings past the Vancouver Canucks in six games, the St. Louis Blues in five (where he was pulled for the only time in the playoffs in game three), and the defending Stanley Cup champions Colorado Avalanche in the Western Conference final, and eventually the Carolina Hurricanes in five games in the finals to win the Stanley Cup, his first of his two championships. During the conference finals against Colorado, he became the first goaltender to be awarded an assist on an overtime game-winning goal in the postseason after passing the puck to Wings captain Steve Yzerman, who then assisted Fredrik Olausson in scoring the final goal of the third game of that series. He also set a record for most shutouts in a postseason with six, broken the year after by Martin Brodeur with seven.

That summer, Hašek officially announced his retirement on 25 June 2002, so that he could spend time with his family and other hobbies. However, after Detroit's first-round loss to the Mighty Ducks of Anaheim in the following season, he expressed his desire to play again. The Red Wings picked up the option on his contract on 1 July 2003, and this created an awkward and difficult situation for the Red Wings, who had two years left on Curtis Joseph's three-year $24 million contract, who left the Toronto Maple Leafs in the 2002 off-season as a UFA to replace Hašek as the teams starting goaltender, and who also had a no-trade clause. Detroit was also under pressure knowing that the rival Avalanche would be looking for a goaltender of at least more or of equal talent to replace Patrick Roy after his retirement on 28 May 2003. With Manny Legace also on the Wings' roster, Detroit now had three potential starting goaltenders.

In the 2003–04 season Hašek injured his groin after playing just 14 games. On 9 January, he and the team agreed he should rest his injury for two to four weeks. Hašek privately told general manager Ken Holland that he would not accept any pay while he was injured. On 10 February, he announced that he was not going to continue to play that season, surprising the Red Wings management. He eventually revealed that he refused about $3 million of his $6 million salary. In April 2004, he underwent groin surgery in Prague, and returned to his hometown of Pardubice to recuperate.

=== Ottawa Senators (2005–2006) ===
After his contract with the Red Wings expired, Hašek announced his intention to play for a Stanley Cup contender, and specifically named the Ottawa Senators as a possibility. On 6 July 2004, after trading starting goaltender Patrick Lalime to the St. Louis Blues, the Senators signed Hašek to a one-year deal.

During the 2004–05 NHL lockout, Hašek toured with the Primus Worldstars. Similar to the tour Wayne Gretzky and IMG formed during the 1994–95 NHL lockout, the Primus Worldstars Tour ran 7–23 December, playing in seven different countries (Riga, Latvia; Moscow and St Petersburg, Russia; Bratislava, Slovakia; Bern, Switzerland; Karlstad, Jönköping and Linköping, Sweden; Oslo, Norway; Katowice, Poland) in ten scheduled games. The tour competed against all-star teams or club teams of each country.

Hašek played increasingly well for the Senators up until the 2006 Winter Olympics in Turin. During the season, he reached 300 career wins, and his GAA and save percentage were the second-best in the league. Upon departure to Turin, Hašek's equipment was accidentally left behind in Ottawa. This caused Hašek to miss a number of practices with the Czech national team. At the Winter Olympics, he injured his right adductor muscle while making a save in the first qualifying match against Germany, forcing him to leave the game after only 9 minutes and 25 seconds. Hašek's injury caused him to miss the rest of the regular season and postseason, despite several rumours that he would return in time for the playoffs, which he did not. He said that if he were to be re-signed, he would play for a base salary of $500,000 with bonuses.

After the Senators were eliminated in the second round, they opted not to re-sign Hašek.

=== Return to and second tenure with the Red Wings (2006–2008) ===
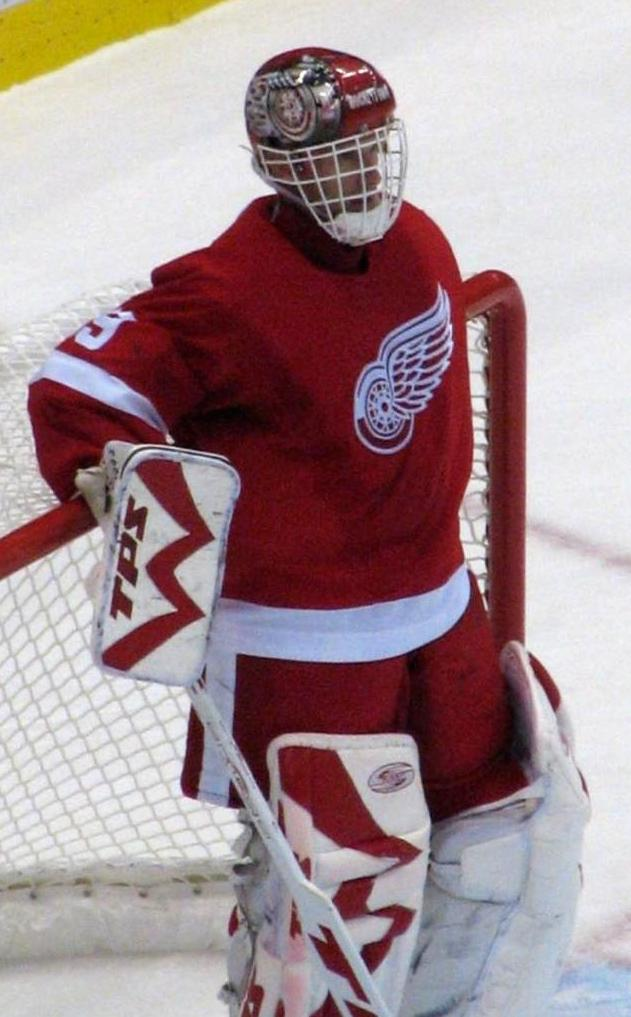
Hašek with the Red Wings in October 2006

On 31 July 2006, at the age of 41, Hašek joined the Red Wings for the second time. He signed a one-year $750,000 US contract, with added bonuses if the team succeeded in the playoffs. He posted 38 wins and a 2.05 GAA while leading the Red Wings to the number one seed in the Western Conference. He also broke his own personal record by going 181 minutes and 17 seconds without allowing a goal. Midway through the regular season, the team announced that to avoid injury and preserve Hašek for the playoffs, he would not play on consecutive nights. He played his first consecutive nights of the season on 21 and 22 April against the Calgary Flames in games five and six of the Western Conference quarterfinals. Hašek won both games, clinching the series for Detroit. In the next round against the San Jose Sharks, the Red Wings were on the road and down two games to one, but Hašek held the Sharks to three goals in the next three games. His 28-save shutout in game six was his 13th in postseason play and sent the Red Wings to the Western Conference finals against the Anaheim Ducks. However, Hašek and the Red Wings lost in six games to the Ducks, who eventually defeated his former team, the Ottawa Senators, for the Stanley Cup.

Hašek contemplated retirement in the 2007 off-season, but on 5 July 2007, he signed a one-year contract with Detroit worth $2 million with up to $2 million in bonuses, reportedly turning down $5 million for salary cap room for the rest of the Red Wings' roster.

During the 2007–08 season, Hašek was replaced by backup Chris Osgood, who he had replaced in 2002 as the teams starting goaltender. When Hašek recovered and got back into his stride, Detroit chose to alternate goaltenders in tandem instead of designating either as the backup. Detroit head coach Mike Babcock announced that Hašek was to start in the 2008 playoffs. Through the first two games against the Nashville Predators, the Red Wings were victorious, but after a lackluster performance in the next two, Osgood was in goal for the remainder of the playoffs. Despite expressing disappointment at losing his starting position, Hašek maintained his professionalism in practice and continued to support his teammates, with Darren McCarty citing a close relationship between Hašek and Osgood. Eventually the Red Wings beat the Pittsburgh Penguins in six games for the Stanley Cup, winning his second and last championship as the backup goaltender for the team in his final NHL season.

On 9 June 2008, Hašek announced his retirement from the NHL, only five days after winning his second Stanley Cup with the Red Wings, saying he lacked the motivation for another year in the NHL. With Osgood, the two were awarded the William M. Jennings Trophy for fewest goals against on a team in the season.

== Final years in Europe and retirement ==
In April 2009, Hašek once again came out of retirement and signed a one-year contract with HC Pardubice, the club where he started his long career. In the 2009–10 season he led his team to win the Czech league title. Hašek had three shutouts in the playoffs, one in the finals, while his Pardubice lost just one game in the playoffs before claiming 12 consecutive wins. For the 2010–11 hockey season, Hašek signed a one-year contract with Spartak Moscow.

On 15 May 2012, Czech website hokej.cz reported that Hašek had discussed playing for Piráti Chomutov after their promotion to the Czech Extraliga. On 25 May 2012, Czech sport website Deniksport reported that Hašek was considering a return to the NHL, possibly with the Red Wings or Tampa Bay Lightning. However, the start of the 2012–13 NHL season was delayed due to the 2012–13 NHL lockout and Hašek announced his retirement on 9 October 2012.

The Sabres retired Hašek's No. 39 jersey prior to a 13 January 2015 game against the Red Wings, making Hašek's number the seventh to be retired in Sabres history. In a ceremony held on 27 January 2017, during the All-Star Weekend in Los Angeles, Hašek was named one of the '100 Greatest NHL Players' in history.

== International play ==
=== 1998 Winter Olympics ===
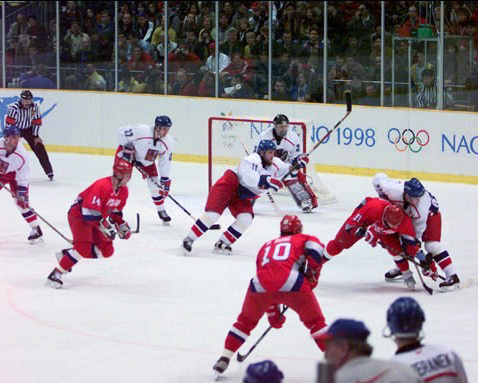
Hašek in goal for the Czech Republic during the gold medal game of the 1998 Winter Olympics

Hašek's most memorable international performance came in the 1998 Winter Olympics, the first edition that the NHL took a break to allow their players to participate, where he led the Czech national team to the gold medal. He allowed six goals in total, with only two of them coming in the knockout round. In the quarterfinals versus the United States, Hašek conceded only a goal to Mike Modano in a decisive 4–1 win. Against Canada in the semifinals, seen as a goaltending duel against Patrick Roy, Hašek allowed only a rebound by Trevor Linden with 67 seconds left in the third period which tied the game at 1-1, sending it to overtime. In a dramatic shootout win, Hašek stopped all five Canadians (Theoren Fleury, Ray Bourque, Joe Nieuwendyk, Eric Lindros and Brendan Shanahan), while Roy allowed only Robert Reichel to score and stopped the next four Czechs. As a result of Hašek's heroics, Wayne Gretzky dubbed him "the best player in the game"; once the NHL resumed Hašek continued his strong performances with the Buffalo Sabres and would go on to win his second consecutive Hart Trophy as MVP.

In the gold medal match, Hašek then shut out the Russian team 1–0 in the final game, stopping 20 shots. He was later announced as the best goaltender in the Olympics. After he won the gold, he was quoted as saying:

When the game ended, I just threw my stick. I was so happy. When I saw the flag go up, I saw my whole career flash before my eyes from the first time my parents took me to a game until now.

Hašek's performance in the 1998 Olympics made him one of the most popular figures in the Czech Republic, so much so that residents chanted "Hašek to the castle!" in the streets, referring to the Prague Castle, the seat of the President of the Czech Republic. In response to this, Hašek called the president Václav Havel and jokingly told him that his job was not in jeopardy. He also helped to inspire an opera (titled Nagano) about the Czech team's gold medal victory, and in 2003, Petr Pravec and Lenka Šarounová named an asteroid (8217 Dominikhašek) in his honour.

=== 2006 Winter Olympics ===
For the 2006 Winter Olympics in Turin, Italy, upon departure from Ottawa, Hašek's equipment was accidentally left behind. This caused Hašek to miss a number of practices with the Czech national team.

In the opening match of the Olympics, he injured his right adductor muscle while making a save in the first qualifying match against Germany, forcing him to leave the game after only 9 minutes and 25 seconds. Despite his absence, the Czechs managed to earn the bronze medal with backup goaltender Tomáš Vokoun, which Hašek received as well.

Hašek's injury from the Olympics caused him to miss the rest of the NHL regular season and postseason with the Ottawa Senators, despite several rumours that he would return in time for the playoffs, which he did not.

== Style of play ==
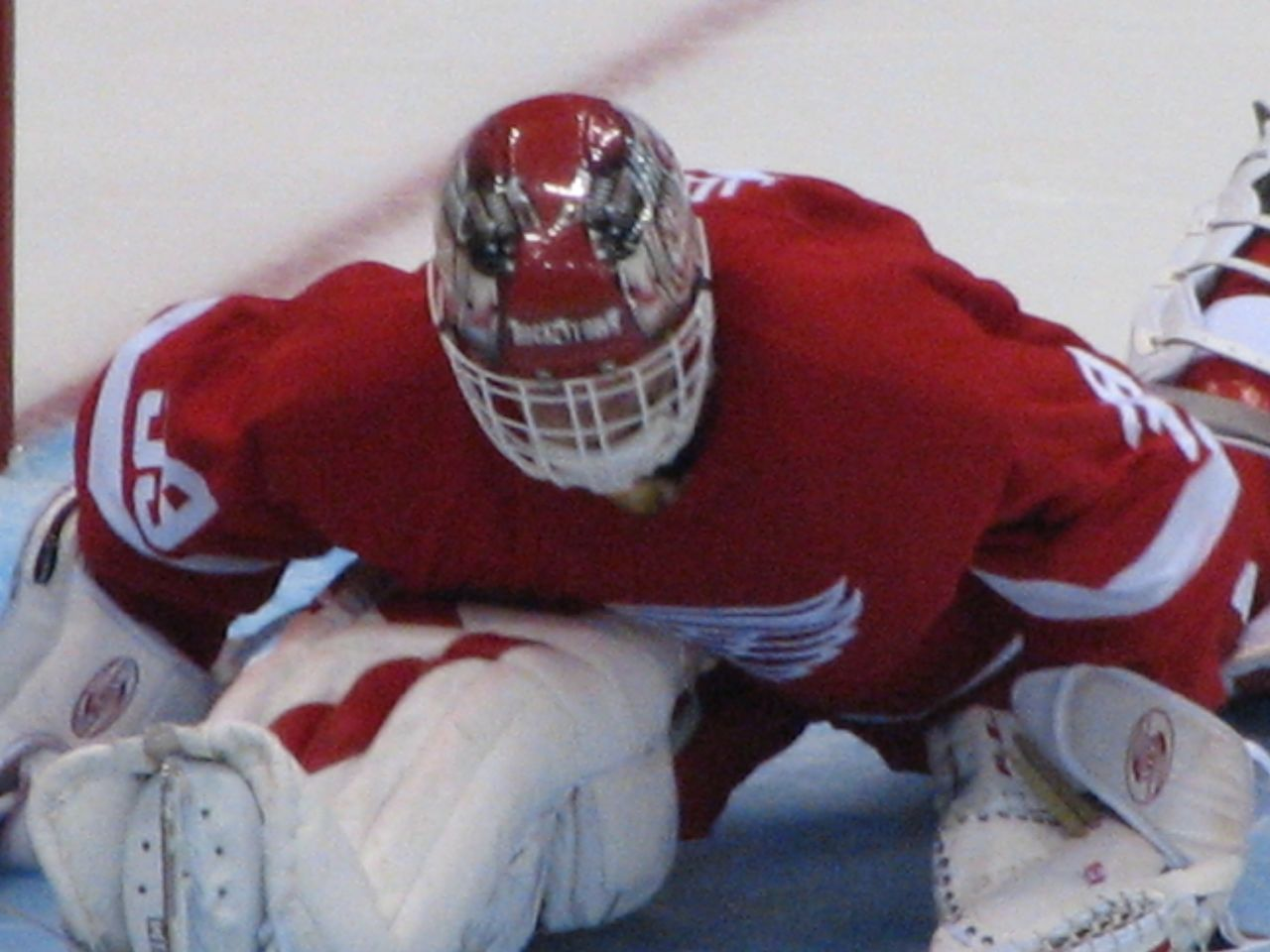
Hašek displaying his flexibility in warm-ups before a 2006 game. Hašek's flexibility is credited as one of his strengths.

Hašek had an unorthodox goaltending style. He was extraordinarily flexible and was jokingly described in a MasterCard commercial as having "a Slinky for a spine". In order to cover the bottom of the net, where most goals are scored, Hašek dropped down on almost every shot. His "flopping" style saw him flailing in the crease, using every part of his body, including his head, to stop the puck. Hašek occasionally dropped his stick and covered the puck with his stick hand, whereas most goaltenders would use the glove hand instead. In response to the speculation he received from his style, Hašek explained:

They say I am unorthodox, I flop around the ice like some kind of fish. I say, who cares as long as I stop the puck?

Hašek's unique style attracted fans to games. Because of his flexibility, Hašek could make difficult saves that other goaltenders could not—an opposing coach once referred to them as "miracle saves". These types of saves include toe-stops and a maneuver known as the "Hašek roll". Hašek was also known for his strict regimen of conditioning. During the off-season between May and September 2006, he lost a considerable amount of weight to increase his flexibility.

Hašek was one of the last goaltenders to wear a helmet-and-cage combo rather than a contemporary hybrid goaltender mask. The last few included his former teammate Chris Osgood, who left the NHL three years after Hašek; Rick DiPietro borrowed one of Osgood's helmets for a short time while he recovered from a facial injury.

== Personal life ==
Hašek and his former wife Alena have a son named Michael (born 1990) and a daughter named Dominika (born 1995). Dominika is the lead singer of the electro-pop band We Are Domi, which represented the Czech Republic in the Eurovision Song Contest 2022, finishing in 22nd place. In November 2012 Hašek announced his divorce after 23 years of marriage. He divides much of his free time playing squash and inline hockey, where he plays defence. When he was younger, Hašek played competitive football as a midfielder, and was a junior tennis champion in Eastern Bohemia. His brother Martin is also a competitive athlete and played for the Czech Republic football team AC Sparta Prague before retiring and eventually deciding to coach. Hobby-wise, Hašek claims that he has been a fan of professional wrestling since his Buffalo days, and says that he mostly follows his favorite wrestlers, Stone Cold Steve Austin and Don "The Rock" Muraco.

Because of his formal education, Hašek stands out among Czech sportsmen. He earned a university degree after studying history and the Czech language in the Faculty of Education at the University of Hradec Králové, which qualified him to be a teacher, and led him to teach high school classes. Hašek also had a brand of sportswear named Dominator Clothing, which was launched shortly after the Nagano Olympics in 1998. It also had two locations in Michigan for a short time. However, sales were low, and the Dominator brand was forced out of business in 2008. In May 2001, Hašek founded the Dominik Hašek Youth Hockey League/Hašek's Heroes, and donated over $1 million to help underprivileged children in Buffalo play hockey. He organized a charity hockey game in Prague in 1998, and donated the profits to hospitals in the Czech Republic.

Hašek was known to appreciate humor to keep team spirits up, and often jokes about his resemblance to Cosmo Kramer of Seinfeld. In the late 1990s, he was featured in a MasterCard commercial that praised his flexibility. On 26 November 2006, Mark Parisi's comic panel off the mark featured a comic about Hašek's childhood.

Throughout his long career, Hašek was represented by agent Ritch Winter.

=== Politics ===
Hašek developed an interest in politics following his retirement from hockey, including possibly running for president of the Czech Republic in 2023 and 2028. He closely followed Czech politics throughout the 2010s before publicly speaking at the Je to na nás! rally in 2019 against Prime Minister Andrej Babiš. When Babiš visited Ivan Hlinka Stadion in Litvínov to discuss renovations to the arena, Hašek wrote on his Twitter account that he did "not want the Czech national sport to be stained by your name." He supported Petr Pavel in the 2023 Czech presidential election; in 2024, Hašek opined that Pavel is "doing an excellent job" and praised him for his pro-Western views and domestic policy.

He was TOP 09's nominee for the 2024 Czech Senate election, running for the 41st district in Benešov. He received 20.28 percent of the vote in the first round, the third most of the six candidates but missing the second round by less than six percent.

In August 2025, he spoke at a rally organized by Milion chvilek pro demokracii to protest political polarization and warn of foreign interference with the 2025 Czech parliamentary election. Hašek pointed to rhetoric made domestically from those like far-right Czech politician Filip Turek and abroad such as Trump for inflaming political tensions within the country, urging to "not let hatred and violence dictate our politics."

Hašek has also commented on American politics. He is a critic of American President Donald Trump, whom he called "unpredictable" and linked to "dictatorship, evil, and endless lies." In 2020, after Trump suggested a Buffalo man injured by police could be an "ANTIFA provocateur" for the George Floyd protests, Hašek called his words "disgusting" and accused Republicans save for Senator Mitt Romney of "hiding like rats." He endorsed Kamala Harris in the 2024 United States presidential election against Trump. After Trump took office, Hašek criticized his administration's friendlier stance towards Russia amidst the Russo-Ukrainian War. In 2026, he denounced United States House of Representatives Speaker Mike Johnson as a "complete scumbag" for ridiculing Congressional attempts to release the Epstein files.

==== Russian invasion of Ukraine ====
Following the 2022 Russian invasion of Ukraine, Hašek advocated for the NHL and Olympics to ban Russians from playing except for those who speak out against it. When the Sabres visited Prague to play in the 2024 NHL Global Series, Hašek did not attend the games to protest the league's inaction. He told The Athletic afterward that he wrote messages to discuss the matter but received "only a brief response" whereas the league "made no effort to have a dialogue". As a result, he decreased his involvement with the NHL. His sentiment extended to other sports as well, such as criticizing the Stade Roland Garros for allowing Russian tennis players.

Hašek has visited Ukrainian cities following their liberation from Russian occupation like Irpin and Bucha. He is an "honorary Fella" of NAFO, a pro-Ukrainian social media movement.

His vocal stances on the war have caused tension with other hockey players and former teammates. He urged fellow Czech Libor Šulák against playing in the KHL and criticized their country's lawmakers for not passing legislation that would prohibit Czech citizens from working in Russia. Ex-Red Wings teammate and Russian politician Viacheslav Fetisov demanded Hašek return the money he received while playing for Spartak Moscow, to which Hašek responded that Fetisov "gave the green light" to Russian war crimes in Ukraine. In 2024, he questioned the induction of Russian and former Red Wings teammate Pavel Datsyuk into the Hockey Hall of Fame, feeling the timing is inappropriate due to the war unless Datsyuk condemned it.

"An NHL that showcases a Putin supporter is an advertisement for Russia's imperialist war. The NHL becomes complicit. Through its stance, the NHL bears a share of responsibility for the people killed and maimed in Russia's war in Ukraine."

— Hašek, in a 2026 op-ed for The Washington Post

When Washington Capitals captain and Russian player Alexander Ovechkin, a supporter of President Vladimir Putin, set the record for the most career goals in NHL history in 2025, Hašek branded him a "huge advertisement for the aggressive Russian war and other Russian crimes." Hašek tweeted beforehand Ovechkin would soon face the guilt of continuing his NHL career amidst his countrymen's deaths and that the league was culpable for the war's casualties by letting him play. Former Russian President Dmitry Medvedev accused Hašek of Russophobia and predicted he would commit suicide once Ovechkin got the record. Interpreting his words as death threats, Hašek reported Medvedev to the International Ice Hockey Federation and International Olympic Committee. Czech Prime Minister Petr Fiala and Foreign Minister Jan Lipavský condemned Medvedev's comments while Interior Minister Vít Rakušan offered protection for Hašek if needed. Hašek also called out Ovechkin and Fetisov when they appeared in a 2026 Russian legislative election campaign video for the Putin-backed United Russia party, and compared the former's support of Putin to German national football team captain Fritz Szepan campaigning for Adolf Hitler during the Nazi period.

After Trump and Putin discussed organizing a game between retired NHL and KHL players, Hašek rejected the possibility of taking part when asked by Russian news agency RIA Novosti in August 2025. He stipulated he would only do so if Putin was convicted on war crimes akin to the Nuremberg trials, Ukraine's territorial integrity was restored, and abducted Ukrainian children were brought home. Otherwise, the game would be an endorsement of Russia's crimes.

=== Inline hockey game incident ===
During an inline hockey game on 18 May 2003, Hašek was accused of assaulting another player. He was playing as a defender for Bonfire Střída when he crosschecked Martin Šíla. The prosecutor in the case, Lenka Strnadová, ruled two months later that there was no evidence that Hašek intended bodily harm and recommended the case be treated as a misdemeanor, punishable only by fine (US$95 maximum), rather than a felony where jail time would have been possible. Hašek's lawyer Pavel Jelínek announced in a statement that media reports about the incident were exaggerated, with Šíla not having sustained any documented injuries. In October 2003, the country's top prosecutor overruled Strnadová, saying her ruling was unlawful because the case had not been properly investigated. The Pardubice prosecutor's office then investigated the case again, and reached the same decision as Strnadová.

== Legacy ==
=== Milestones ===
Hašek earned his 300th National Hockey League win on 15 October 2005, in a 5–1 home victory with the Ottawa Senators over the Boston Bruins. He stopped 34 of 35 shots and was holding a shutout until Bruins forward Pat Leahy jammed a loose puck under him three minutes into the third period. He became the twenty-second goaltender to reach the milestone.

=== Records ===
In nine seasons with the Buffalo Sabres, Hašek acquired over 25 franchise records, including most all-time games played, wins, shutouts and lowest goals against average. He also holds the Sabres' record for most shutouts in a single season with 13 in 1997–98, and lowest goals against average in a single season with a total of 1.87 in 1998–99. During the Detroit Red Wings' championship run in 2002, Hašek set franchise records for most games played, minutes played, wins and shutouts in a playoff year. He holds several notable NHL records:

General
All-time

- 1st place – Highest career save percent (.922)
- 6th place – Most shutouts (81)
- 7th place – Lowest goals against average (2.20)
- 11th place – Most wins (389)

Regular season

- First European goaltender to lead the NHL in GAA (1993–94)
- First goaltender since 1974 to have a GAA below 2.00 (1993–94)
- Most shutouts in one month (six in 1997–98)

Playoffs
All-time

- 2nd place – Most shutouts in one season (6)
- 3rd place – Most shutouts (15)
- 10th place – Most wins (61)

One of the most impressive single-game performances by any player in NHL history came on 27 April 1994. Hašek made 70 saves in a four-overtime shutout. The opposing goaltender was Martin Brodeur, then a rookie, who made 49 saves before being beaten by Dave Hannan, and the Sabres beat New Jersey 1–0, helping them to tie the series 3–3 in the first round of the Stanley Cup playoffs. Hašek's 70 saves set a record, which still stands, for the most saves in a game without allowing a goal.

=== Influence ===
In a 2023 interview, Petr Čech described Hašek as one of his major sporting idols.

== Career statistics ==
=== Regular season and playoffs ===
Bold indicates led league
Bold italics indicate NHL record

			Regular season										Playoffs
Season	Team	League	GP	W	L	T	OTL	MIN	GA	SO	GAA	SV%	GP	W	L	MIN	GA	SO	GAA	SV%
1980–81	HC Pardubice	TCH	9	—	—	—	—	598	24	—	2.98	—	—	—	—	—	—	—	—	—
1981–82	HC Pardubice	TCH	12	—	—	—	—	661	34	—	3.09	—	—	—	—	—	—	—	—	—
1982–83	HC Pardubice	TCH	42	—	—	—	—	2,358	105	—	2.67	—	—	—	—	—	—	—	—	—
1983–84	HC Pardubice	TCH	40	—	—	—	—	2,304	108	—	2.81	—	—	—	—	—	—	—	—	—
1984–85	HC Pardubice	TCH	42	—	—	—	—	2,419	131	—	3.25	—	—	—	—	—	—	—	—	—
1985–86	HC Pardubice	TCH	45	—	—	—	—	2,689	138	—	3.08	—	—	—	—	—	—	—	—	—
1986–87	HC Pardubice	TCH	43	—	—	—	—	2,515	103	—	2.46	—	—	—	—	—	—	—	—	—
1987–88	HC Pardubice	TCH	31	—	—	—	—	1,862	93	—	3.00	—	—	—	—	—	—	—	—	—
1988–89	HC Pardubice	TCH	42	—	—	—	—	2,507	114	—	2.73	—	—	—	—	—	—	—	—	—
1989–90	Dukla Jihlava	TCH	40	—	—	—	—	2,251	80	—	2.13	—	—	—	—	—	—	—	—	—
1990–91	Indianapolis Ice	IHL	33	20	11	1	—	1,903	80	**5**	2.46	—	1	1	0	60	3	—	3.00	—
1990–91	Chicago Blackhawks	NHL	5	3	0	1	—	195	8	0	2.46	.914	3	0	0	69	3	0	2.60	.923
1991–92	Indianapolis Ice	IHL	20	7	10	3	—	1,162	69	1	3.56	—	—	—	—	—	—	—	—	—
1991–92	Chicago Blackhawks	NHL	20	10	4	1	—	1,014	44	1	2.60	.893	3	0	2	158	8	0	3.03	.886
1992–93	Buffalo Sabres	NHL	28	11	10	4	—	1,429	75	0	3.15	.896	1	1	0	45	1	0	1.33	.958
1993–94	Buffalo Sabres	NHL	58	30	20	6	—	3,358	109	**7**	**1.95**	**.930**	7	3	4	484	13	2	**1.61**	.950
1994–95	HC Pardubice	CZE	2	—	—	—	—	—	—	—	—	—	—	—	—	—	—	—	—	—
1994–95	Buffalo Sabres	NHL	41	19	14	7	—	2,416	85	**5**	**2.11**	**.930**	5	1	4	309	18	0	3.49	.863
1995–96	Buffalo Sabres	NHL	59	22	**30**	6	—	3,417	161	2	2.83	**.920**	—	—	—	—	—	—	—	—
1996–97	Buffalo Sabres	NHL	67	37	20	10	—	4,037	153	5	2.27	**.930**	3	1	1	153	5	0	1.96	.926
1997–98	Buffalo Sabres	NHL	**72**	33	23	13	—	**4,220**	147	**13**	2.09	**.932**	15	10	5	948	32	1	2.02	.938
1998–99	Buffalo Sabres	NHL	64	30	18	14	—	3,817	119	9	1.87	**.937**	19	13	6	1,217	36	2	1.77	**.939**
1999–00	Buffalo Sabres	NHL	35	15	11	6	—	2,066	76	3	2.21	.919	5	1	4	301	12	0	2.39	.918
2000–01	Buffalo Sabres	NHL	67	37	24	4	—	3,904	137	**11**	2.11	.921	13	7	6	833	29	1	2.08	.916
2001–02	Detroit Red Wings	NHL	65	**41**	15	8	—	3,872	140	5	2.17	.915	**23**	**16**	7	**1,455**	45	**6**	1.85	.920
2003–04	Detroit Red Wings	NHL	14	8	3	2	—	817	30	2	2.20	.907	—	—	—	—	—	—	—	—
2005–06	Ottawa Senators	NHL	43	28	10	—	4	2,584	90	5	2.09	.925	—	—	—	—	—	—	—	—
2006–07	Detroit Red Wings	NHL	56	38	11	—	6	3,341	114	8	2.05	.913	18	10	8	1,140	34	2	1.79	.923
2007–08	Detroit Red Wings	NHL	41	27	10	—	3	2,350	84	5	2.14	.902	4	2	2	202	10	0	2.91	.888
2009–10	HC Pardubice	CZE	36	24	12	0	—	2,066	77	3	2.24	.921	13	12	1	785	22	3	1.68	.937
2010–11	Spartak Moscow	KHL	44	23	18	3	—	2,591	106	**7**	2.45	.915	4	0	4	204	14	0	4.12	.864
TCH/CZE totals			353	—	—	—	—	20,487	944	—	2.76	—	13	12	1	785	22	3	1.68	.937
NHL totals			735	389	223	82	13	42,836	1,572	81	2.20	.922	119	65	49	7,317	246	14	2.02	.925

=== International ===
Bolded numbers indicate tournament leader

Year	Team	Event	GP	W	L	T	MIN	GA	SO	GAA	SV%
1982	Czechoslovakia	EJC	5	—	—	—	—	—	—	3.00	—
1983	Czechoslovakia	WJC	6	—	—	—	—	—	—	3.33	—
1983	Czechoslovakia	WC	2	1	1	0	120	5	1	2.50	—
1984	Czechoslovakia	CC	4	0	3	1	188	12	0	4.00	—
1984	Czechoslovakia	WJC	7	4	0	2	380	10	0	1.89	—
1986	Czechoslovakia	WC	9	5	3	1	538	19	0	2.12	—
1987	Czechoslovakia	WC	9	5	2	2	520	19	1	2.19	—
1987	Czechoslovakia	CC	6	2	3	1	360	20	0	3.33	—
1988	Czechoslovakia	OLY	5	3	2	0	217	18	0	4.98	—
1989	Czechoslovakia	WC	10	4	4	2	600	21	**2**	2.10	—
1990	Czechoslovakia	WC	8	5	3	0	480	20	1	2.50	—
1991	Czechoslovakia	CC	5	1	4	0	300	18	0	3.60	—
1998	Czech Republic	OLY	6	5	1	0	**369**	6	**2**	**0.97**	.961
2002	Czech Republic	OLY	4	1	2	1	239	8	0	2.01	.924
2006	Czech Republic	OLY	1	0	0	0	9	0	0	0.00	1.000
Junior totals			11	—	—	—	—	—	—	3.16	—
Senior totals			69	32	28	8	3940	166	7	2.40	—

== Awards and honours ==
Award	Year(s)
NHL
NHL All-Rookie Team	1992
William M. Jennings Trophy	1994, 2001, 2008
Vezina Trophy	1994, 1995, 1997, 1998, 1999, 2001
NHL First All-Star Team	1994, 1995, 1997, 1998, 1999, 2001
NHL All-Star Game	1996, 1997, 1998, 1999, 2001, 2002
Hart Memorial Trophy	1997, 1998
Lester B. Pearson Award	1997, 1998
Stanley Cup champion	2002, 2008
One of 100 Greatest NHL Players	2017
Czechoslovakia / Czech Republic
Czechoslovak First League Best Goaltender	1986, 1987, 1988, 1989, 1990
Golden Hockey Stick	1987, 1989, 1990, 1997, 1998
Czech Sportsperson of the Year	1994, 1998 and 2001
Czech Hockey Player of the 20th century	1998
Czech Extraliga champion	2010
International
EJC Best Goaltender Award	1982
WJC Best Goaltender Award	1983
WC All-Star Team	1987, 1989, 1990
WC Best Goaltender	1987, 1989
Olympic Games Best Goaltender	1998
IIHF Hall of Fame	2015
IIHF All-Time Czech Team	2020

== See also ==
- List of NHL statistical leaders

Awards and achievements
Preceded by Vladimír Růžička; Vladimír Růžička	Czechoslovak Golden Hockey Stick; 1987; 1989, 1990	Succeeded by Vladimír Růžička; Bedřich Ščerban
Preceded by Jaromír Jágr	Czech Golden Hockey Stick; 1997, 1998	Succeeded by Jaromír Jágr
Preceded by Ed Belfour; Jim Carey; Olaf Kölzig	Winner of the Vezina Trophy; 1994, 1995; 1997, 1998, 1999; 2001	Succeeded by Jim Carey; Olaf Kölzig; José Théodore
Preceded by Ed Belfour; Roman Turek; Niklas Bäckström, Manny Fernandez	Winner of the William M. Jennings Trophy; 1994 (with Grant Fuhr); 2001; 2008	Succeeded by Ed Belfour; Patrick Roy; Tim Thomas, Manny Fernandez
Preceded by Jan Železný; Tomáš Dvořák	Czech Athlete of the Year; 1994; 1998	Succeeded by Jan Železný; Tomáš Dvořák
Preceded by Mario Lemieux	Winner of the Hart Memorial Trophy; 1997, 1998	Succeeded by Jaromír Jágr
Preceded by Mario Lemieux	Winner of the Lester B. Pearson Award; 1997, 1998	Succeeded by Jaromír Jágr
