= Je to na nás! =

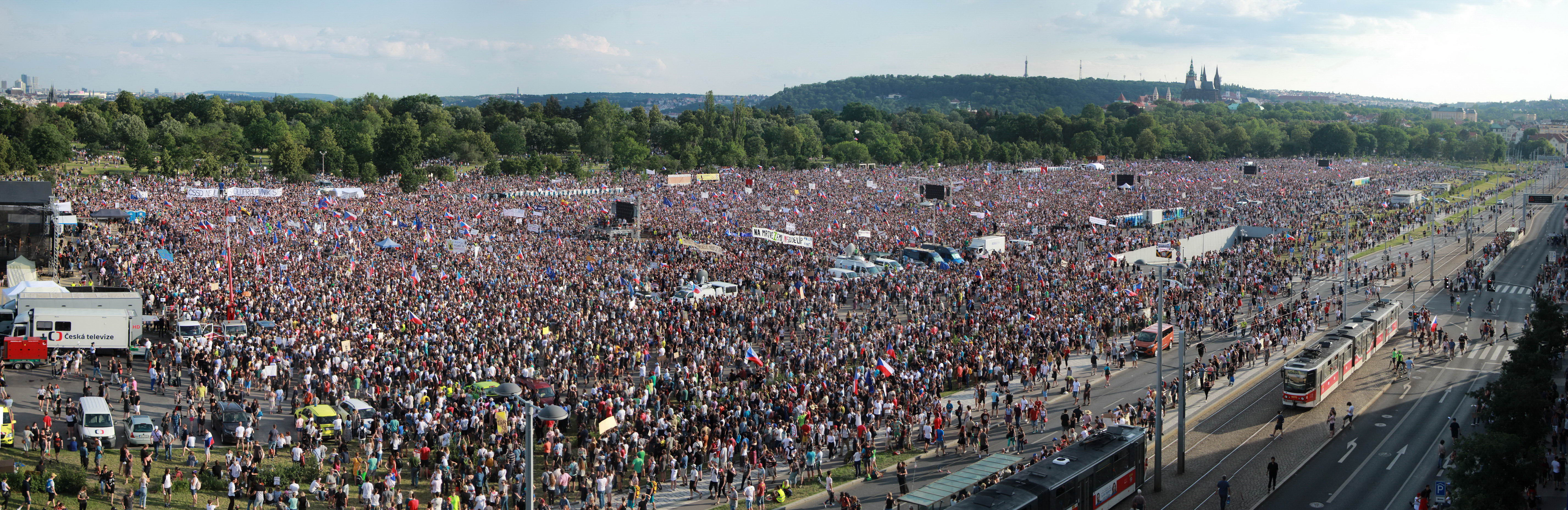
Panorama of the demonstration, Prague Castle in the background on the right

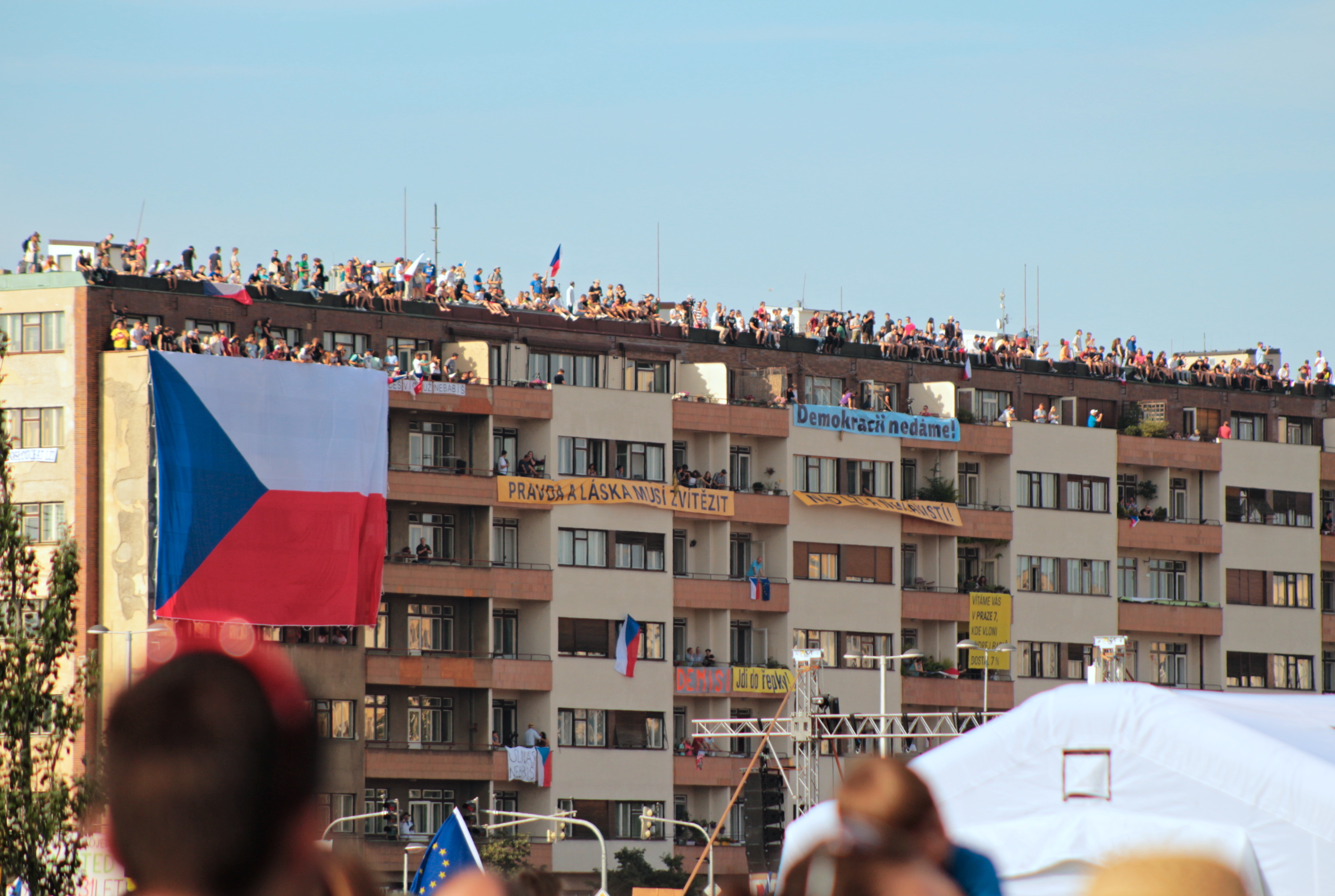
Protesters during the demonstration on one of the houses nearby Letná plain and a big Czech flag

Je to na nás! (English: It is up to us!) was a political demonstration held on 23 June 2019, on Letná in Prague, part of a wider series of protests in the country. It was the biggest protest in the Czech Republic since the fall of Communism in 1989, attended by around 250,000 people, many of them demanding the resignation of the Czech prime minister Andrej Babiš and his justice secretary Marie Benešová. It was the 14th of 15 demonstrations held against Babiš and Benešová in spring 2019, organized by the Czech campaign association Milion chvilek pro demokracii.

The main trigger for the protest was the alleged conflict of interest of the prime minister, who was under criminal investigation related to European Union subsidies and also perceived to have chosen a political ally, Benešová, as justice secretary, which could threaten the Czech justice system. The protests also criticised the Czech president Miloš Zeman, who organisers and speakers said was harming Czech interests with his behavior and pro-Russia and pro-China stances.

Babiš told Czech media that while he respected people's right to have an opinion, he didn't understand the reasons behind the protests.

== See also ==
- Milion chvilek pro demokracii
