= Milion chvilek pro demokracii =

Political organization in the Czech Republic

Milion Moments for democracy
- Logo of Million Moments for Democracy, symbolizing the participation in democracy as a question
- Formation: November 17, 2017; 9 years ago
- Headquarters: Prague
- Leader: Mikuláš Minář
- Website: www.milionchvilek.cz

Milion chvilek pro demokracii (lit. 'A Million Moments for Democracy'), registered as Milion Chvilek, z. s., is a Czech civic movement and watchdog association whose primary focus is on defence of democracy, rule of law and the independence of public-service media. It describes its aims as cultivating political culture, watching over democratic institutions, and awakening a sense of civic responsibility; its main activities are petitions, demonstrations, voter-mobilisation campaigns, public discussion and community organizing. It grew out of a student petition addressed to Andrej Babiš in November 2017 and was registered in January 2018 by a group of students around Mikuláš Minář and Benjamin Roll. The association’s funding is based on small donations and is independent of state or EU's budgets.

The movement became known in the Czech Republic for organising extensive petition campaigns and large demonstrations. Prostests in Letná Park in Prague drew roughly 250,000-300,000 people each in 2019 and 2026, according to most estimates, and were the largest in the country since the Velvet Revolution of 1989.

== Background ==
After the victory of ANO 2011 in elections to the Chamber of Deputies in October 2017, Czech President Miloš Zeman appointed the leader of the movement, Andrej Babiš, as Prime Minister and tasked him with the formation of the government. In December 2017, a minority government was formed of members of ANO 2011 only, but this government failed to win a January 2018 confidence vote in parliament and resigned. In June 2018, Babiš formed a second minority government, a coalition of ANO 2011 and the Social Democrats (ČSSD), with the support of deputies from the Communist Party (KSČM) for the first time since the Velvet Revolution.

== Aims and approach ==
The association says its goal is to cultivate political culture in the Czech Republic, watch over democratic institutions, and above all to awaken civic responsibility. Its stated demands over time have included an independent judiciary, rules against conflicts of interest, and the independence of public media. It has said that it would not become a political party.

== History ==
=== 2017–2018: Origins ===
Shortly after the election, on 17 November 2017, the 28th anniversary of the Velvet Revolution, a group of students led Mikuláš Minář, a student of the Faculty of Philosophy and Evangelical Theology at Charles University, published a petition, "A Moment for Andrej", demanding that Babiš fulfil his pre-election promise to "support and develop democracy in the Czech Republic", explain his role in the Stork's Nest case, and respect democratic standards. Within 100 days, the petition was signed by tens of thousands of citizens, but Babiš refused to meet the group and did not respond publicly to the letter.

The authors of the letter accused Babiš of disrespecting constitutional customs by appointing his allies as officials in state administration and on supervisory boards without parliamentary approval. In addition, the European Anti-Fraud Office (OLAF) published a report at the turn of 2017 and 2018, asserting that enough evidence existed to proceed with criminal charges against Babiš. In February 2018, the Bratislava Regional Court dismissed a lawsuit from Babiš claiming that he was being falsely accused as an StB agent.

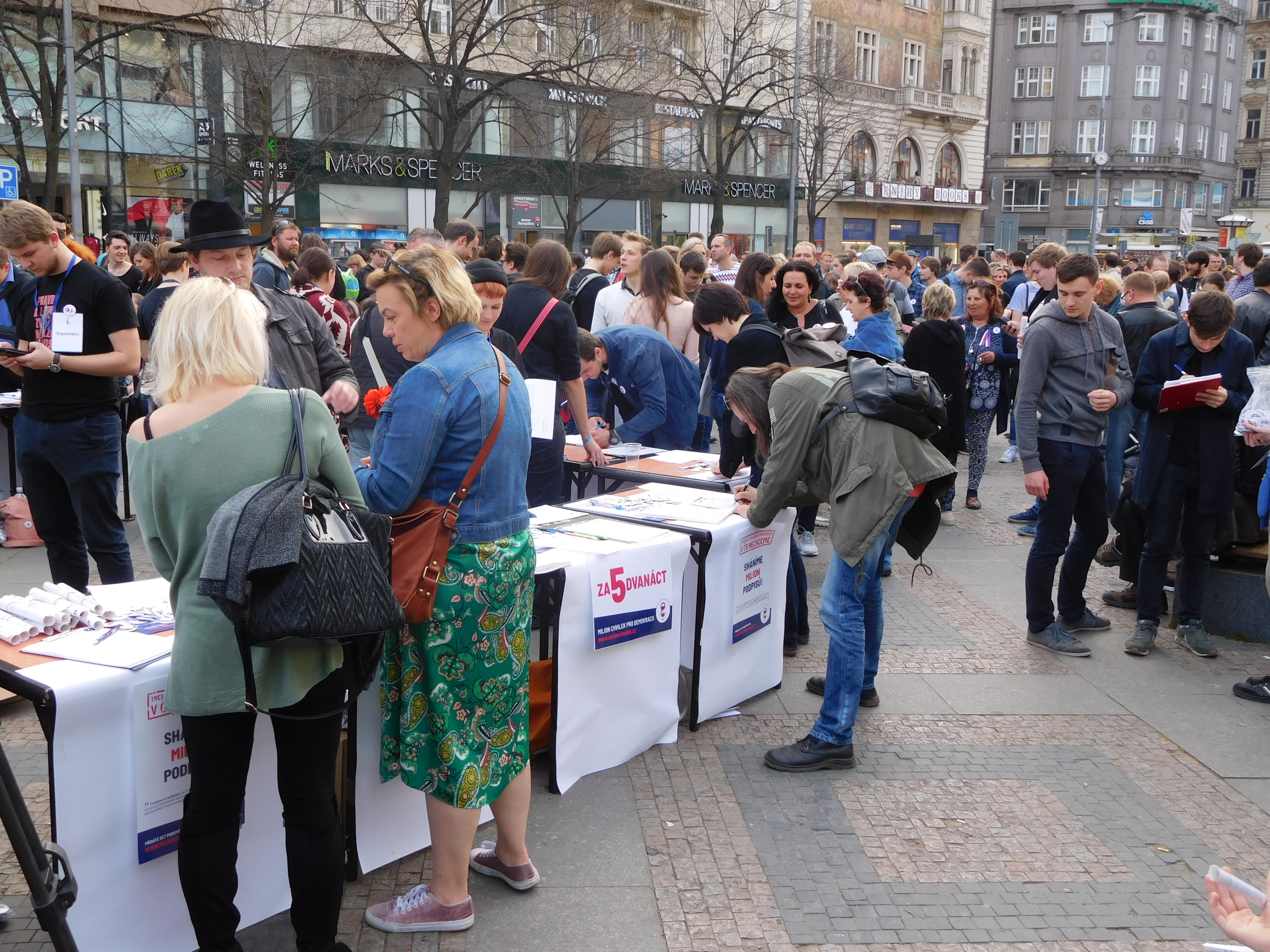
People are signing a Wait for Resignation petition at a demonstration on April 9, 2018, in Prague.

The group registered as an association in January 2018. On 25 February 2018 on the 70th anniversary of the 1948 communist coup, and 100 days after the previous unsuccessful petition, it launched a campaign called Chvilka pro rezignaci (lit. A Moment for Resignation), calling for Babiš to resign as prime minister and setting a target of one million signatures. The organizers of the campaign declared their respect for the result of the democratic elections, acknowledging that the Prime Minister should come from the victorious ANO movement, but arguing that it was unacceptable for them to be someone under criminal investigation with a past as an StB agent.

To begin with, the campaign was centered around the "Chvilka" call for resignation, in which the authors demanded Babiš's resignation as Prime Minister. The declared goal of the campaign was to obtain one million signatures for this demand in 100 days. Although this was not achieved, more than 254,000 people signed the petition by 5 June 2018, including prominent artists (including Jan Svěrák, Jiří Suchý, and Vojtěch Dyk), scientists (Jiří Grygar, Pavel Jungwirth), clergy (Václav Malý), athletes (Vavřinec Hradilek) and politicians. The organizers continued collecting signatures after this deadline, and Million Moments for Democracy developed into a longer-term campaign.

Tens of thousands more people signed the petition in November 2018, following news reports of Babiš's son Andrei Jr's stay in Crimea. By 20 November, 310,000 people had signed the petition, and by May 2019 this was over 340,000. One week after a large demonstration in Letná in June 2019, over 420,000 people had signed, including as signatories further notable artists (Milan Knížák, Alice Nellis, Aneta Langerová), scientists, clergy, athletes (Zuzana Hejnová, Michal Šlesingr, David Navara) and politicians.

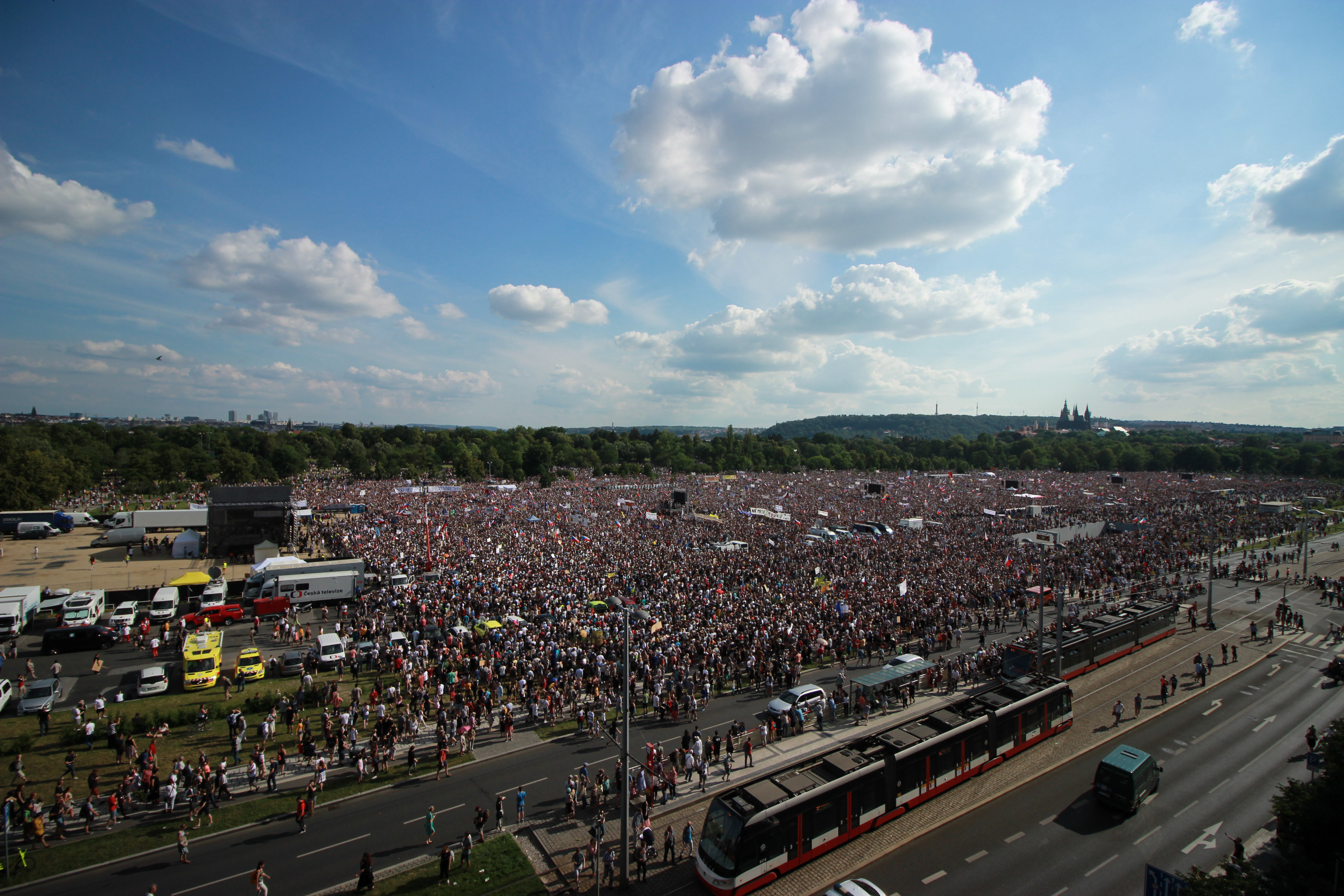
Demonstration against prime minister Andrej Babiš and justice minister Marie Benešová on 23 June 2019, Letná Park in Prague

=== 2019: Spring wave of protests and Letná I. and II. ===
In spring 2019, after Marie Benešová was appointed justice minister, the association held weekly demonstrations in Prague and other towns. Organisers argued that she was an unsuitable choice because she had previously questioned Babiš's prosecution in the Stork's Nest case. The series culminated on 23 June 2019, when the 14th protest, "Je to na nás!" (It's up to us!) took place in Letná Park in Prague. It was the biggest protest since the fall of Communism in 1989. More than 250,000 people attended the protest, calling for the resignation of Babiš and his justice secretary Marie Benešová. Babiš dismissed the rally with the remark that it was nice weather and so people had gone to a concert, for which he later apologised.

A second Letná rally followed on "Letná 2 – znovu za demokracii" (Letná 2 – Again for Democracy) was again held in Letná on 16 November 2019, on the eve of the 30th anniversary of the Velvet Revolution in 1989. The protest was again attended by around 250,000 people. According to the organisation's chair, Mikuláš Minář: "First and foremost, we want politicians who respect democratic principles and institutions, who do not lie, do not embezzle, do not intimidate, and do not have conflicts of interest." The association named four "red lines" that, if crossed by politicians, would bring it back to the streets: the independence of the justice system, the use of amnesty or the abolition of criminal proceedings, conflicts of interest, and the media.

=== 2020–2021: Leadership change and Lidé PRO ===
In September 2020 Minář resigned as chair, saying he did not want to burden the association with his deliberations about entering politics. Roll was elected chair, and Minář said that the association would not become an election movement. In December 2020 Minář announced a political movement, Lidé PRO (lit. People FOR), and said he would stand in the 2021 election if it gathered 500,000 supporters' signatures. In 2021 he announced that the movement would not contest the autumn parliamentary election, saying that it had turned out he was not the most suitable leader.

During the COVID-19 restrictions, the association held an online demonstration, Rok změny (lit. Year of Change), on 16 November 2020, in which leaders of opposition parties took part. The association also called on opposition parties to cooperate rather than split the vote. In the October 2021 election, two coalitions, Spolu and Pirates and Mayors, won 108 of the 200 seats, and Babiš lost office.

=== 2022–2024: Presidential elections and support for Ukraine ===
On 27 February 2022, three days after the Russian invasion of Ukraine, the association organised a rally in support of Ukraine on Wenceslas Square. About 80,000 people attended, and speakers included Prime Minister Petr Fiala and the Ukrainian ambassador. The association also took part in the presidential election through the ‘Together for a Democrat’ campaign. The second round saw Andrej Babiš face off against Petr Pavel, who ultimately emerged victorious. In March 2023 the Office for Oversight of the Management of Political Parties and Political Movements fined the association 40,000 CZK for running a campaign in the January presidential election without being registered with the office.

In 2024, the organisation's collective leadership was again replaced by a chairperson-led system. Mariana Novotná Nachtigallová was elected chair, and by early 2025, the association was chaired by Lukáš Hilpert. Seznam Zprávy reported that the organisation had been quiet as it was focusing on community organizing and educational programmes, and quoted Hilpert saying it could return to the streets if the political situation changed.

=== 2025–2026: From elections to Letná III. and IV. ===
==== 2025 election and the new government ====
Ahead of the October 2025 parliamentary election, the association ran a voter mobilisation campaign, Dese(t) k volbám ("Ten to the elections"/"Come and vote"), aimed at hesitant voters, and held film screenings at more than 100 locations on 25 September. On 28 September, Minář, who had resigned as chair years earlier, appeared at a rally on Old Town Square, and the association urged people to vote for one of the pro-Western parties.

After Babiš won the election and formed a government of ANO 2011, Freedom and Direct Democracy (SPD), and the Motorists, Million Moments held a demonstration against its formation, titled Česko není na prodej ("Czechia is not for sale"), at which Minář replaced Hilpert as chair.

==== Support for President Pavel and Letná III. ====
In early 2026, Million Moments organised rallies in support of President Petr Pavel, amid his dispute with the Motorists' leader Petr Macinka over Pavel's refusal to appoint MP Filip Turek as Minister of the Environment. A rally in Prague on 1 February was reported to have drawn up to 90,000 people. On 15 February, gatherings were held in towns across the country; the organisers said that people from more than 400 towns had registered, and about 8,000–10,000 attended in Brno. A "We stand behind the president" petition launched by the association had been signed by about 780,000 people by 22 February.

On 21 March 2026, the association held a rally at Letná under the slogan Nenecháme si ukrást budoucnost ("We will not let our future be stolen"), which Minář said was a warning against the erosion of democracy and the "oligarchisation" of society. Organisers claimed that a quarter of a million people attended. The actor Zdeněk Svěrák spoke in support of public media.

==== Campaign for public-service media ====
In April 2026 the association launched a petition, Ruce pryč od médií (lit. Hands off the media), against proposals from Babiš's government to replace licence fees for Czech Television and Czech Radio with funding from the state budget from 2027. The petition had about 175,000 signatures by the time of a march organised in Prague on 5 May. Further marches were held in 12 regional cities on 17 May and in Prague on 24 May.

On Saturday 24 October 2026 at 4:36 am the governing coalition passed the bill to its second reading, and on 25 October the association held a protest on Old Town Square against the bill and against the conduct of the vote. Employees of Czech Television and Czech Radio planned a strike for 3 November, and the association called a further demonstration for 15 November at Letná.

==== Senate and municipal elections ====
Before the October 2026 Senate and municipal elections, the association invited senate candidates to sign a declaration 27 z 27 ("27 [Senate seats] out of 27 [up for election]") of what it called the basic democratic minimum, and offered to help connect those who did with volunteers. On 28 September, the movement held a rally on Old Town Square urging people to vote, to deny the governing parties a Senate majority, and not to vote for populists and extremists in the municipal elections.

== Demonstrations ==
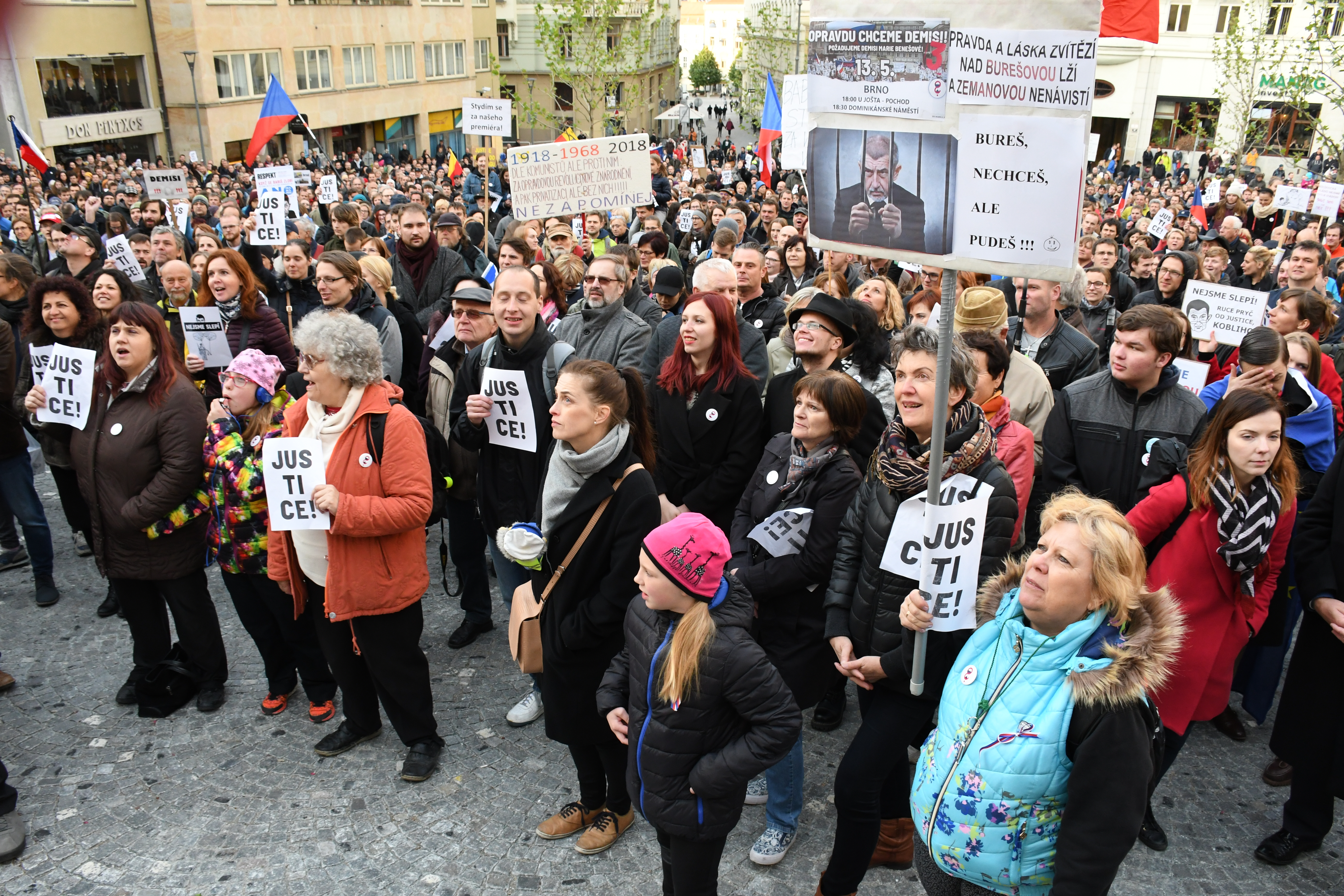
Demonstration on May 13, 2019, in Brno

When Andrej Babiš failed to form a second government in the spring of 2018, President Zeman was scheduled to announce on 10 April whether he would nominate someone else to form a government. The previous day, on 9 April, the Million Moments for Democracy initiative staged a rally on Wenceslas Square in Prague entitled "For a Decent Prime Minister and a Decent Government", attended by several thousand people, with similar events held in two dozen Czech cities. The protests were driven by the recent resignation of Communist MP Zdeněk Ondráček as Chair of the Commission for the Control of the General Inspectorate of Security Forces (GIBS), following demonstrations in 11 Czech cities on 5 March 2018.

Further protests in May and June 2018 were directed against the nature of the planned Babiš government, which relied on the votes of KSČM deputies. These included the so-called "silent protest" on 22 May, the "lid protest" on 29 May, and a meeting of the signatories of the Chvilka petition for resignation on 5 June, when protesters filled the upper half of Wenceslas Square. However, Babiš' Second Cabinet was sworn in on 27 June 2018.

== Timeline of demonstrations ==
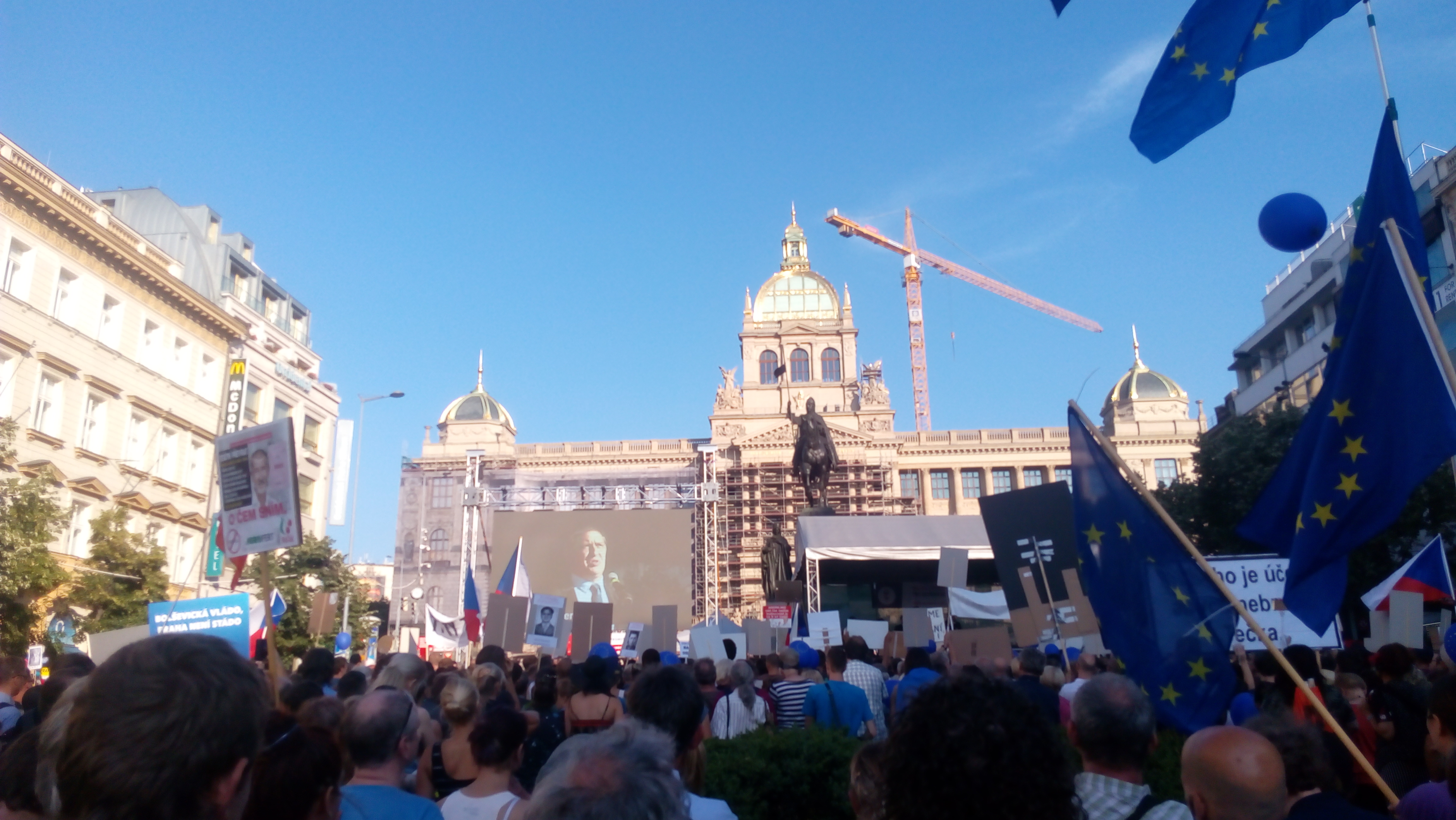
Demonstration on June 5, 2018, in Prague

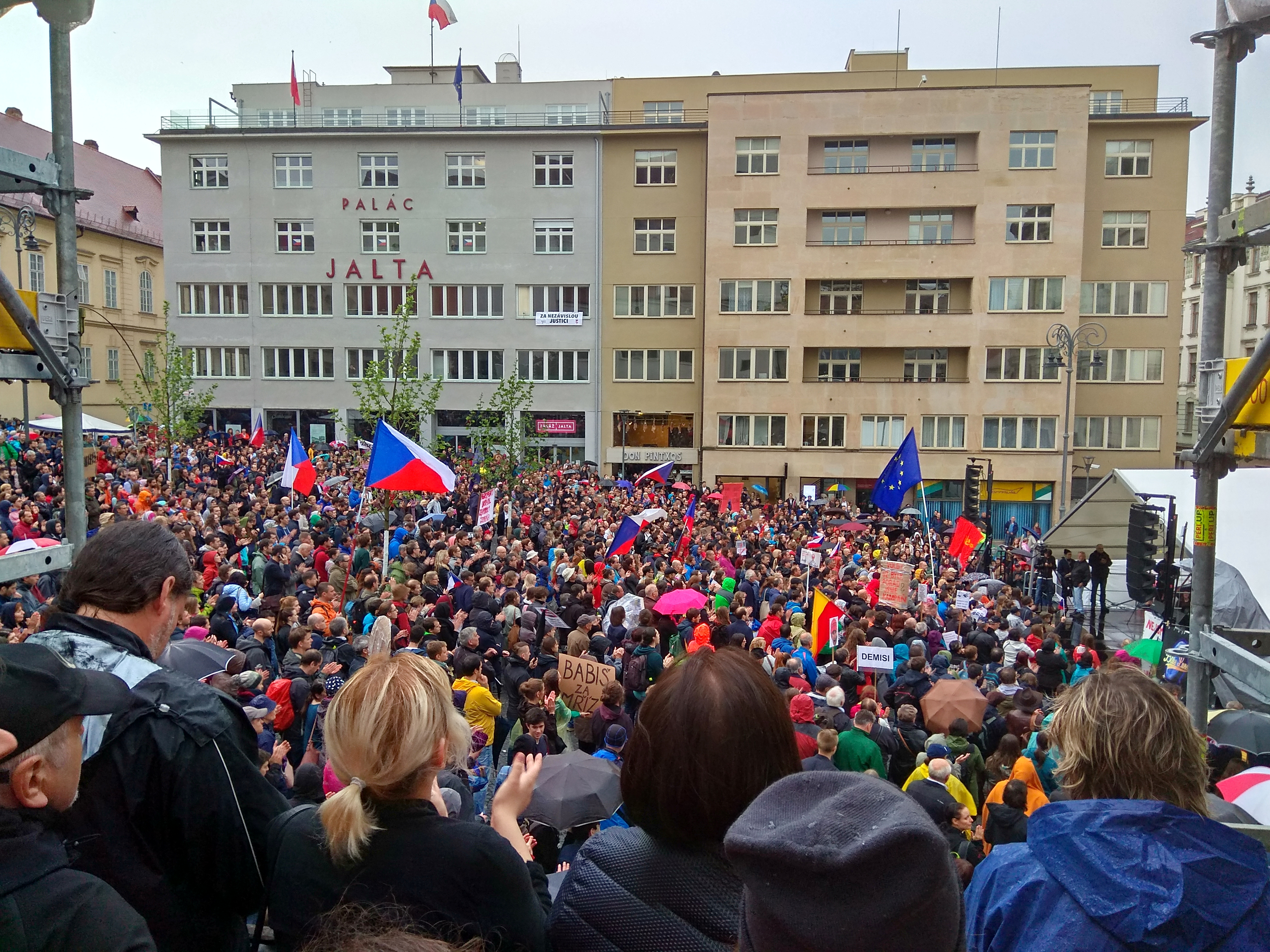
Demonstration on May 28, 2019, in Brno

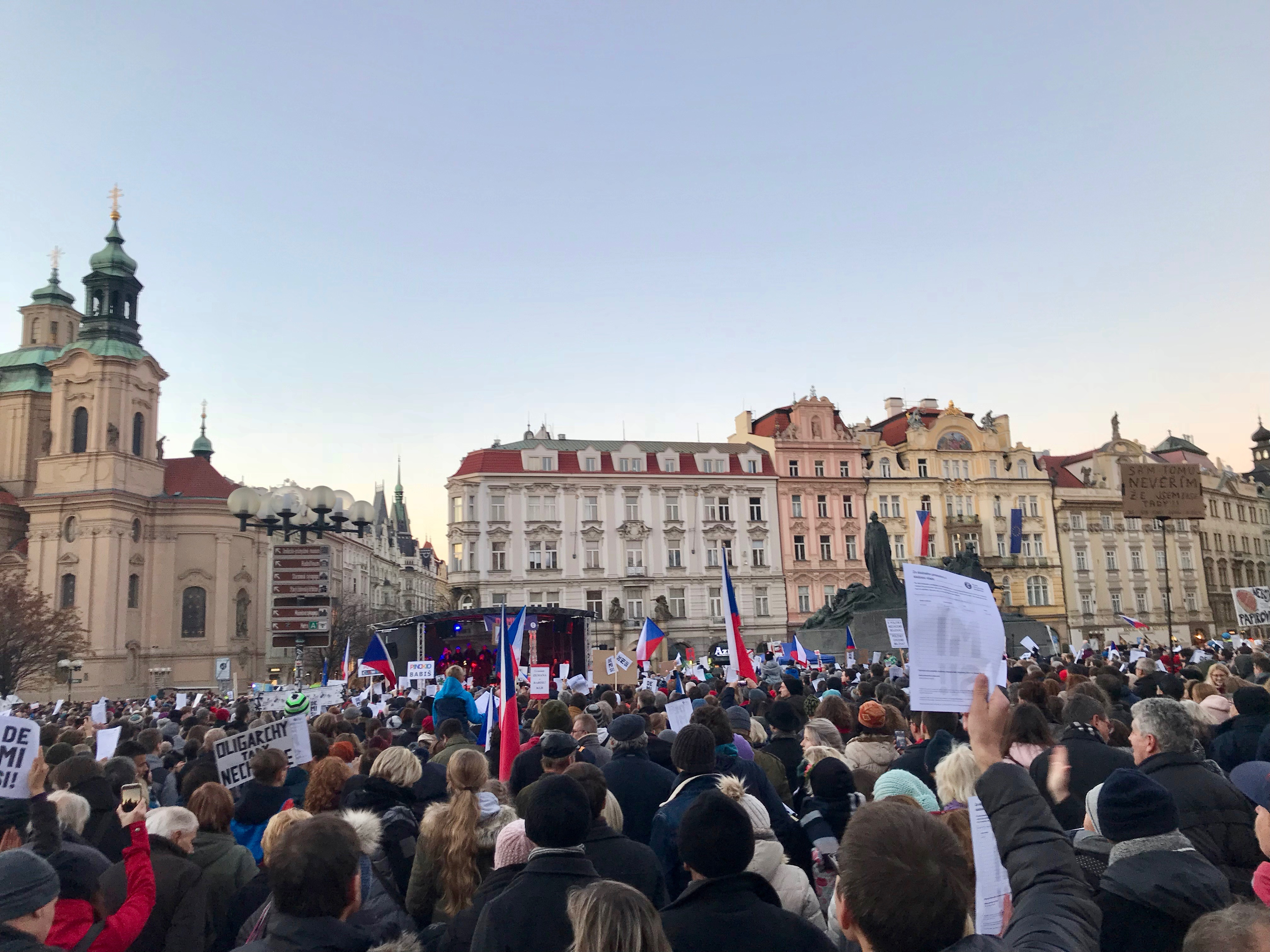
Demonstration on November 17, 2018, in Prague

=== 2018 ===
1. For a decent prime minister and a decent government "(April 9, 2018, Wenceslas Square)
2. "Silent Debate" (May 22, 2018, Old Town Square with a march to the seat of the Office of the Government of the Czech Republic)
3. "The Last Ring" (May 29, 2018, Old Town Square)
4. "Once and for all" (June 5, 2018, Wenceslas Square and other 200 towns and villages)
5. "Dear! March for Decent Czechia" (November 17, 2018, Old Town Square)
6. "Distrust! March for a Trustworthy Government." (November 23, 2018, Hradčany Square)

=== 2019 ===
1. "Judiciary! We are not blind! Don't sit at home! March for the Independence of Justice." (April 29, 2019, Old Town Square)
2. "Judiciary! Let's go again! Let's stand up for the independence of the judiciary!" (May 6, 2019, Old Town Square)
3. "Judiciary! We really want resignation! We demand the resignation of Marie Benešová!" (May 13, 2019, Old Town Square and 130 other towns and villages)
4. "Everyone to Václavák - Demis! It is time to issue an account to the government." (May 21, 2019, Wenceslas Square, according to the organizers up to 50,000 people)
5. "We have had enough! We want resignation!" (May 28, 2019, 240 towns and villages)
6. "We have had enough! We want resignation!" (June 4, 2019, Wenceslas Square, according to the organizers up to 120 thousand people)
7. "We want resignation! + We invite to Letná." (June 11, 2019, 300 towns and villages)
8. "It's up to us!" (June 23, 2019, Letná Park, over 280,000 people)
9. "Steps for Democracy" (28 September 2019, 160 events in various places)
10. "Letná 2 - again for democracy!" (November 16, 2019, Letná Plain, over 250,000 people)
11. "Demis Andrej Babiš!" (December 10, 2019, Wenceslas Square, 35-80 thousand people)
12. "Dear! The end of the rule of one magpie "(December 16, 2019, protests in 220 municipalities and cities in the Czech Republic except regional ones)
13. "The future without Babiš!" (December 17, 2019, Wenceslas Square, 15,000 people)

=== 2020 ===
1. "Let's face the disintegration of institutions!" (March 1, 2020, Hradčany Square -> Old Town Square)
2. "You haven't had enough yet ?!" (June 9, 2020, Old Town Square)
3. "A Year of Change: Getting Started!" (November 16, 2020, online protest on the Milion Chvilek YouTube channel, over 50,000 views)
4. "Light for Bečva" (December 20, 2020, Střelecký Island in Prague)

=== 2021 ===
1. "Carnival ride through Prague - a show of government problems" (February 13, 2021, self-demonstration in front of the Strahov Stadium and a convoy around Prague, around 300 cars)
2. "Castle beyond the edge, the republic in danger!" (April 29, 2021, Wenceslas Square, 20,000 people and 72 towns and villages)
3. We Will Not Back Down: We Won't Give Up the Justice System! (May 20, 2021, Wenceslas Square)
4. March for a Just Government (June 1, 2021, from Albertov to Wenceslas Square)
5. Together for Belarus (June 7, 2021, Old Town Square). Sviatlana Tsikhanouskaya, the main representative of the Belarusian opposition, also spoke at the event.
6. Demonstrations in the Regions (June 8, 2021, 50 municipalities across Czechia)
7. We Are Heading to the Finale: We Will Not Back Down! (June 20, 2021, Wenceslas Square)
8. 100 Years Was Enough (June 27, 2021, commemorative gathering at the Memorial to the Victims of Communism at Prague's Újezd and a march to the KSČM headquarters, in cooperation with Post Bellum)
9. The Path of Change: You Are the Key to Democracy! (November 17, 2021, Old Town Square)

=== 2022 ===
1. We Stand with Ukraine (February 22, 2022, Wenceslas Square in Prague)
2. We Stand with Ukraine 2 (February 27, 2022, Wenceslas Square in Prague, approx. 80 thousand people)
3. Europe Stands with Ukraine (March 4, 2022, Wenceslas Square and 9 other European cities). Ukrainian President Volodymyr Zelenskyy also joined the event live via the internet.
4. We Can't Watch This Anymore! (March 31, 2022, Hradčany Square)
5. Against Fear and Hatred (October 30, 2022, Wenceslas Square, filled square)

=== 2023 ===
1. Pavel Blažek's Last Straw (August 23, 2023, Klárov)

=== 2024 ===
1. Go Home, Ivan! (August 20, 2024, Boris Nemtsov Square, Prague 6, hundreds of people)
2. Let's Remain the Democratic Heart of Europe (November 17, 2024, Old Town Square, thousands of people)

=== 2025 ===
1. Pre-election rally (28 September 2025 | Old Town Square, Prague | Not stated )

=== 2026 ===
1. "Support for President Pavel" (1 February 2026 | Prague | Up to about 90,000)
2. Regional gatherings in support of the president (15 February 2026 | More than 400 towns (per organisers) | Hundreds to thousands per town; Brno 8,000–10,000)
3. "We won't let our future be stolen" (21 March 2026 | Letná Park, Prague | About 250,000 by organisers)
4. "Hands off media" (5 May 2026 | Old Town Square, Prague | "Tens of thousands" by organisers)
5. "Hands off media" marches (17 and 24 May 2026 | 12 regional cities; Prague | Not stated)
6. Election-turnout rally (28 September 2026 | Old Town Square, Prague | Not stated)
7. "Hands off media" (25 October 2026 | Old Town Square, Prague | Thousands)
8. "Letná against 4:36" (15 November 2026 | Letná Park, Prague | "roughly 400,000" by organisers)

== Reception and criticism ==
Supporters describe the association as a civic watchdog that has mobilised large numbers of people across the whole country in defence of democracy and rule of law, while government politicians and some commentators describe it as a partisan pressure group. In 2025, after the association announced a rally, an ANO MP Taťána Malá said she regretted that it had woken up after it had "hibernated" for the previous four years. A survey reported by the Czech News Agency found that public opinion of the association's events differed sharply by party preference, which its authors said reflected a polarisation between the opposition and government camps.

== Funding and legal matters ==
The association collects donations from individuals, including through the Darujme.cz platform. It says that it does not take state funding.

In 2021 police reported a protest by the association at a book-signing by Babiš in Průhonice to the Černošice municipal office over a suspected offence; the office dropped the case, finding that no offence had been committed.

In 2021, the association was fined 35,000 CZK by the political-finance oversight office for failing to comply with the conditions for participation in the election campaign. After several rounds of legal proceedings, the Supreme Administrative Court ruled that the fine was unlawful. In 2023 the political-finance oversight office again fined the association 40,000 CZK for running an unregistered campaign for the presidential election.

In 2025, the Prague High Court ordered former Communist Party leader Vojtěch Filip to apologise to the association for linking it to a cyberattack on a hospital.

== Impact ==
The 2019 Letná rallies were widely reported as the largest demonstrations in the country since 1989. However, Babiš did not resign, and remained in office until after the 2021 election. The leaders of the parties that formed the subsequent government credited the association's pressure with contributing to the formation of opposition electoral alliances and the change of government, though the importance of Million Moments's role in events is disputed by critics.

== In film ==
The documentary Chvilky naděje (lit. Moments of Hope; English title Million Moments), directed by Amálie Kovářová, tells the story of the association's two founders. It was released in 2025.

== See also ==
- 2017 Czech government crisis
- Czech TV crisis
- Velvet Revolution
- Je to na nás!
